= Go Superlambananas! =

Art exhibition in Liverpool, England

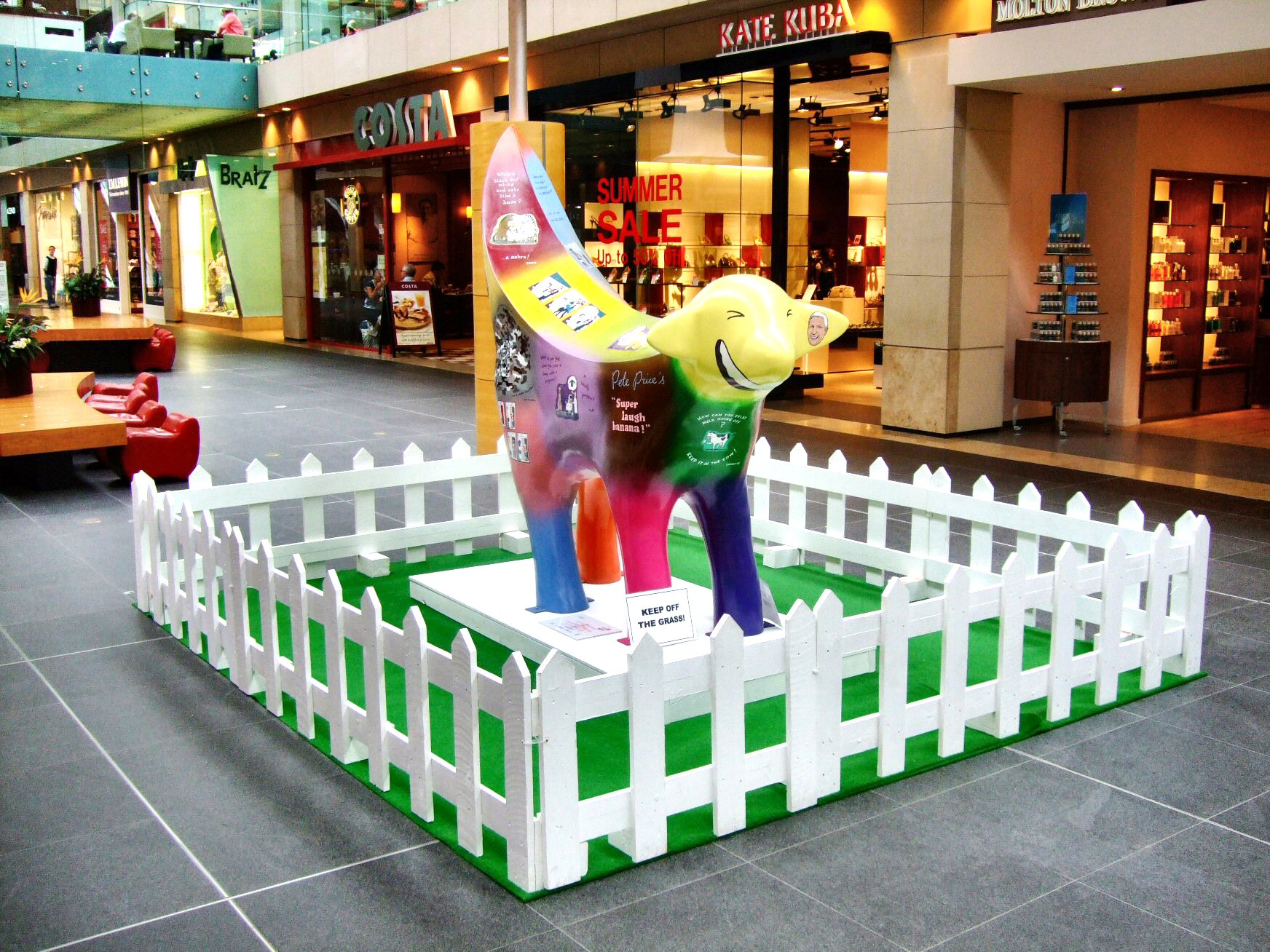
Pete Price's Super Laugh Banana

Go Superlambananas! was an art exhibition that took place in Liverpool, England, during the city's European Capital of Culture celebrations in 2008. Based upon Taro Chiezo's Superlambanana, which had been located in Liverpool since 1998, the exhibit consisted of 124 two metre high replicas, which were located throughout Liverpool and the surrounding areas. Each mini-Superlambanana was individually designed by local community groups and artists, with a range of public and private sector organisations providing sponsorship funding. The mini-Superlambananas were on display for ten weeks, from June to August 2008.

== Background ==
The Go Superlambananas! art exhibition was developed and based upon the Superlambanana sculpture that has been located in Liverpool since 1998. The sculpture is a cross between a banana and a lamb, designed by Manhattan-based Japanese artist Taro Chiezo for the 1998 ArtTransPennine Exhibition. Superlambanana's design is also heavily influenced by the history of Liverpool itself, as historically both sheep and bananas were common cargos in the city's docks. The original sculpture weighs almost eight tons and stands 17 feet tall. Throughout its history the sculpture has been located in various areas throughout the city and on occasions even further afield. It currently stands on Tithebarn Street, outside the Liverpool John Moores University Avril Robarts Library/Learning Resource Centre.

== History ==
The Go Superlambananas! exhibition was developed by the Liverpool Culture Company (LCC), led by its Creative Director Phil Redmond, in partnership with the Wild In Art. As part of the city's Capital of Culture celebrations, the LCC were eager to develop a cultural event in which local people could be involved not just in its consumption, but also its production. The eventual idea settled on, was to build upon the Superlambanana artwork, which had over time come to be recognised as a symbol of Liverpool in itself. As a result, 124 mini-SuperLambananas were created, each of which acted as a blank slate, on which various groups throughout the city could develop and design their own cultural contribution the city's celebrations.

== Auction ==
At the end of their ten-week run, the mini Superlambananas were auctioned off for the Lord Mayor's charities, with each having a guide price ranging from £3,000 to £8,000. The first of two auctions was held at St George's Hall on the 9 September 2008 with 68 Superlambananas up for sale. In total they sold for £550,000 or approximately £7,800 each, well above estimates. The highest bid on the night was £25,000, paid by the Chairman of National Museums Liverpool for 'Mandy' Mandala Superlambanana, designed and created by Cheshire artist Patricia Lee, whilst Phil Redmond, creative director of the Liverpool Culture Company, purchased four lots for a total of £55,000. Other notable purchasers included comedian John Bishop, playwright Fred Lawless and Big Brother star Craig Phillips. A second, internet-based auction took place on 16 September 2008 with 25% of the proceeds going to charity.

== Exhibits ==
124 replica Superlambananas were created as part of the exhibition. Each one was designed and sponsored by different organisations and subsequently located throughout the city and in some instances further afield.

Complete list of mini-Superlambananas

Liverpool City Centre

Name	Artist(s)	Sponsor(s)	Location
24hoursuperlambanana	Debbie Ryan	'08 Business Connect	Clayton Square
Art Vandelist	Artvandelay.com	PS Collective	East Village, Duke Street
Atlambtic Companion	Nicola McGovern	Atlantic Container Line	Prince's Dock
B of the Baa	Phil Costello	Northwest Regional Development Agency	Exchange Flags
Baa Baa Braille Sheep	Jola Kurzeja-Ryan; students from the National Blind Children's Society	Merseytravel	Liverpool Lime Street station
Baa-ve New World	Sally Olding	Liverpool Vision	Liverpool Town Hall
BackBitternBanana	Sophie Bower; Kathryn Pattullo	Liverpool School of Art and Design, Liverpool JMU	Metropolitan Cathedral
Banana Rock	Christine O'Reilly Wilson	Aggregate Industries	The Strand
Beryl Sebastian	Youndaddaction; Liverpool Youth Advisory Group; Sophie Backhouse; Ian Town	Youngaddaction Liverpool	Clayton Square
Bloomin' Lamb Banana	Lower Lee School	Woolton in Bloom; Woolton Educational and Recreational Trust	Woolton Street
Cargo	Phillip Marsden	St George's Hall, Liverpool City Council	St George's Hall
Chops	Alix Dryden	Northwest Regional Development Agency	Exchange Flags
Commercial District Skyline	David Flanning	Liverpool Commercial District Partnership	St Paul's Square
Deerlamboltnana	T.J. Dolan	Wild In Art	East Village, Duke Street
Ewes Water Wisely	Lisa Parry; Christian Ewen	United Utilities	Albert Dock, City Centre
Fire Cracker to Martian Skies	Laurence Payot	Utility	Bold Street
First Past the Post	Pamela Holstein	Liverpool Chamber of Commerce and Industry	Old Hall Street, City Centre
Flora	Rosalind Hargreaves	Northwest Regional Development Agency	Exchange Flags
Friendship Forever	Jessica Gardiner; Benjamin Small	St John's Shopping Centre	St John's Shopping Centre
Green Lamb	Ed Butler; Julian Taylor	Holiday Inn	Holiday Inn, Lime Street
Herd Days Night	Mark Jones	Maghull Developments	Hope Street
Homer	Kim Tan; Creative Services; Liverpool City Council	Liverpool Mutual Homes; Fusion 21	Wellington Column, Lime Street, City Centre
I love Granadaland	Laura McCreesh; Mike Badger	ITV Granada	Metquarter, City Centre
Kenny the Superlamb	Barbara Galt; Children from Kensington	City and North Neighbourhood Management Services	Hall Lane, Kensington
Koppy	Graham Berry; the Apple Agency	Adidas	LFC Shop, Liverpool One, City Centre
Lamb-bassador	Anna Povall; Benjamin Small	World Firefighter Games 2008	Echo Arena, City Centre
Lambline	Rachael Ward	Merseytravel	James Street station, City Centre
Lamsa	Katriona Beales; Finoon Saleh	The Bluecoat Society	Bluecoat Chambers
Light Exposure, Light Emission	Smiling Wolf	Balfour Beatty	The Strand, City Centre
Loop of Life	Mike Curtis	Crowne Plaza Hotels and Resorts	Crowne Plaza, Prince's Dock, City Centre
Mandy Mandala Superlambanana	Patricia Lee; Arts in Regeneration; residents of Granby, Toxteth and Dingle	South Central Management Team; Liverpool City Council	Formerly Princes Boulevard, later Museum of Liverpool
Mona	Charlotte Brown	English Cities Fund	St Paul's Square, City Centre
Monument to the Superlambanana	Andrew Jackson	Public Monuments and Sculpture Association	World Museum Liverpool, William Brown Street
Our George	Liverpool O8 Volunteers; KECS Creative Community Arts	08 Welcome; Liverpool Culture Company	St George's Plateau
Our Working Community	Holly Langley	North West TUC	Wellington Column, St George's Plateau
Pete Price's Super Laugh Banana	Pete Price; Phillip Marsden	Liverpool Daily Post; Liverpool Echo	Metquarter, City Centre
Petite Fleur	Helen Marie-Gilmour	Metquarter	Metquarter, City Centre
Portraits	Clair Freeman	WT Jenkins	Albert Dock, City Centre
Purple Sky at Night	Alex Jackson	Wrenco	Hope Street
Push Me Pull Ewe	Phillip Marsden; Ben Cook	Sayers	St John's Shopping Centre
Reflectana	Annabel Wakefield	Kier Construction	Debenhams, Liverpool One, City Centre
Rocksy	Ben Cook	Northwest Regional Development Agency	Exchange Flags, City Centre
Roy G Biv	Olivia Simpson	DCT Civil Engineering	The Strand
Savio the Superlambanana	Kerry Hunt; Savio High School	Alliance & Leicester	St Paul's Square, City Centre
Sgt Pepper	Liverpool Hope University fine art and design students	Hard Day's Night Hotel	Blakes Restaurant, North John Street, City Centre
Super 'WiFi' Lambananafon	Jon Wood; Gareth Shuttleworth; Chimp Creative	BT/Fon	Echo Arena, City Centre
Superabbeyroadbanana	Vince Cleghorne; Kensington Youth Inclusion Project	Kier North West	Brownlow Hill
SuperChaiseLongueBanana	Leanne Wookey; Team a go-go; Julian Taylor; J&A upholstery	Bruntwood	Radisson SAS Hotel, Old Hall Street, City Centre
Superchromebanana	Stephen Heaton; Lawn Creative; Lloyds Autobody	Jurys Inn	Kings Waterfront, City Centre
Superconnectedlambanana	Alison Little	BT Openzone Wireless Broadband	British Home Stores, Lord Street
SuperCottonwoolbanana	Kate Bedford	Bruntwood	Cotton Exchange, City Centre
Superfitbanana	Shape Design	Lifestyles Fitness Centre	Millenium House, Whitechapel
Superfive-a-daybanana	Vince Cleghorne; Kensington Junior Youth Inclusion Project	National Museums Liverpool	Walker Art Gallery, William Brown Street
Supergrassbanana	Stephen Heaton; Lawn Creative; Julian Taylor	Hill Dickinson Lawyers	Old Hall Street
Superkalazarbanana	Ektor Diaz; Rod Dillon	Liverpool School of Tropical Medicine	Pembroke Place
Superlamba-x-ray and child	Dominic Foster; Ashlea Haynes; Liverpool Hope University fine arts student	Liverpool Women's NHS Foundation Trust	Liverpool Women's Hospital
Superlambananaleaves	Alison Little	Brock Carmichael Architects; BCA Landscape and Project Services	Cotton Exchange, City Centre
Superlambananatree	Amanda Oliphant	Virgin Trains West Coast	Liverpool Lime Street station
Superlambgranada	Mark Nuttall	ITV Granada	Liverpool One, City Centre
Superlambswoolbanana	Ian Town	Wild in Art	08 Place, 36-38 Whitechapel
SuperLawbanana	Clare Gammond; Jeanne-Marie Kenny	Hill Dickinson Lawyers	Old Hall Street, City Centre
SuperLewis'sLamb 152	Lewis's Visual Team	Lewis's	Lewis's Department Store
SuperLightBanana	Lisa Rostron; Lawn Creative; Julian J Taylor	2020 Liverpool	St George's Hall
Superlordmayorlambanana	Brian Hanlon	Liverpool City Council	Liverpool Town Hall, City Centre
SuperLoveBanana	Anna Benson	Liverpool Registration Services	Cotton Exchange, City Centre
SuperPlazaLambanana	Kate Bedford	Bruntwood	The Plaza, Old Hall Street, City Centre
SuperRoyalambanana	Kate Bedford	Bruntwood	Queens Arcade, Castle Street, City Centre
SuperSgtPepperYellowSubmarineBanana	Paul McKay	Alliance & Leicester	Albert Dock, City Centre
SuperStudentlambanana	Jeanne-Marie Kenny	University of Liverpool	Brownlow Hill
SuperWagBagBanana	Nook and Willow; John McNally	Liverpool City Central Business Improvement District	Houghton Street, City Centre
Sushi, Lamb Tempurabanana Table 5 now!!	Linda Barlow	Sapparo Teppanyaki	Echo Arena, City Centre
The Best of British	Mark Garrod	Cains	Cains Brewery
The Loving Lamb	Annemarie Read	Greater Merseyside Learning Providers Federation	Berry Street
The North End	Claire Stringer; Trinity RC Primary School	Vauxhall Neighbourhood Council	NSPCC, Great Homer Street
The Rope Walker	BDP; Shape Design	BDP	St Peter's Square
Top Banana	Finch and Candida Boyes	Rumford Investments	20 Chapel Street, City Centre
Twinkle	The Langhorne Family	Malmaisson	Malmaisson, Prince's Dock, City Centre
Twinny Lambanana	KECS Creative Community Arts	European Year of Intercultural	Hope Street
United Lambanana	Lisa Parry; Rachel Teare	United Utilities	Albert Dock, City Centre
Working Towards the Future	Mike Badger; St Matthew's Primary School; St Mary's Primary School	Portemps People Development Group	Church Street
Yellow Superlambanana in a cage 2008	Uniform	Uniform	Arthouse Square
Zip	Janice Egerton	Liverpool Hope University	The Cornerstone Building

North Liverpool

Name	Artist(s)	Sponsor(s)	Location
Blueberry Banana	Debbie Ryan; Blueberry Park Primary School	Berrybridge Housing Association	Blueberry School, Ackers Hall Avenue
Both Sides of the Baaas	Pauly Riley; students from NOCN Art Programme	HM Prison Liverpool	HM Prison Liverpool, Walton
Bridge-it	Louise Wood; Clubmoor Youth Centre	Art Valley Neighbourhood Management Services	Clubmoor Youth Centre, Larkhill Lane
Cobanana	Cobalt Youth Board; Andrew Weston	Cobalt Housing	Lower House Lane and Utting Avenue
Fazakerly Night Fever	Vik	Aintree University Hospitals NHS Foundation Trust	Aintree Hospital
Fizz	Sharon Mutch; Fazakerley 506 Detached Youth Project	Cobalt Housing	Fazakerley Community Federation
It's Just a Superlambanana	Harry Harris	Community Justice Centre, North Liverpool	Community Justice Centre, Vauxhall
Peekaboo Newsham Superlambanana	AiR Associates; Communities of North Liverpool	Arts in Regeneration and Newsham; Adult Learning Services	Newsham Park, Newsham Drive
Rocking Superlambanana	Alex Corina	Wild in Art; Royal Liverpool Children's Hospital Alder Hey Imagine Appeal	Royal Liverpool Hospital Alder Hey
Stanley	Vince Cleghorne; Hugh Baird College	Evolve Neighbourhood Regeneration; Hugh Baird College	Hugh Baird College, Stanley Road
Starry Sunflower	Alan Murray	Cosmopolitan Housing Group	Olive Mount Gardens, Wavertree
Super St. Domingo Lamb Banana	Candida Boyes	Everton Football Club	Goodison Park
SuperFanBanana	Steve Rooney; Sue Williams; Liverpool Royal School for the Blind	Liverpool Football Club	Anfield, Anfield Road
SuperConeBanana	Jacqueline Boylan	Open Culture	ICDC, Edge Lane
Superlidbanana	Nicki McCubbing; Orrell Park Youth Club	Alt Valley Neighbourhood Management Services	Black Bull Pub, Cedar Road
Tinky	Neil Keating; Alsop High School	Liverpool Housing Trust	Walton-on-the-Hill Church

South Liverpool

Name	Artist(s)	Sponsor(s)	Location
Colours of Hope	Laura Cheston; St Jerome's Primary School	Liverpool Hope University	Taggart Lodge, Hope Park
Generation 21	Toxteth Learning Networks School; Roz Hyde	Liverpool Healthy Cities	Aigburth Road
Happy Feet	Julie Edwards; Hunts Cross Primary School	Liverpool City Council	Park near Hunts Cross Library
LambMapBanana	Claire Stringer	South Central Management Team; Liverpool City Council	Allerton Library
Peel	Lisa Parry; Ben Cook	Riverside Group	Speke Boulevard
Springy	Springwood Heath Primary School	Liverpool City Council	Springwood Heath Primary School, Danefield Road
Superbeezbuzzbyawildlambanana	Jan Bell; Caroline Hunt	HLF Wildflower Heroes Project	National Wildflower Centre
SuperLarryLambanana	Mike Badger; Lawrence Community Primary School	Riverside Group	Picton Children's Centre, Lawrence Road
The Big Hope	Big Hope delegates	Liverpool Hope University	The Gateway, Hope Park
The Lee Valley CAAT	Holly Langley; Belle Vale and Naylorsfield Community Association	Lee Valley Housing Association	Belle Vale Shopping Centre
Tudorlambanana	Gateacre C.C. School; KECS Creative	Friends of Gateacre; Gateacre C.C. School	Gateacre Village
Urbananasplash	Julian Taylor	Urban Splash	Matchworks
World Changer	Hannah Marshall	Frontline Church	Frontline Centre, Lawrence Road
Youth Division	Wade Deacon Arts Team; Sophie Backhouse; Ian Town	BBC North West Tonight; Arts Council England North West	Speke Boulevard

Rest of Merseyside

Name	Artist(s)	Sponsor(s)	Location
Cloudorama	Paul Cousins	Lady Lever Art Gallery	Lady Lever Art Gallery, Port Sunlight
Culture Chalk	Jacqueline Boylan	The Grange; Pyramids Shopping Centre	Pyramids Shopping Centre, Wirral
Flora Lambanana	Rosalind J Hargreaves	Wirral Metropolitan Borough Council	Birkenhead Park, Wirral
Past Port to the Future	Clair Freeman	Port Sunlight Museum and Garden Village	Port Sunlight Vision Museum, Wirral
Rover	Candida Boyes	Tranmere Rovers	Prenton Park, Wirral
SuperStegbanana	Mark Hendry; Team a-go-go; Ben Cook	Ness Gardens; University of Liverpool	Ness Gardens, Wirral
Tiger in the Woods	Candida Boyes	Sefton Metropolitan Borough Council, Liverpool Culture Company	Coastal Road and Shore Road, Ainsdale

Outside Merseyside

Name	Artist(s)	Sponsor(s)	Location
Lovemedoodle	Adam Pitt	Virgin Trains West Coast	London Euston station (and later Liverpool Lime Street station)
Smiley Lamb	Alex Austin; Emily Lansley	Halton Borough Council	Runcorn station
The Highest Superlambanana	Students from Flintshire and Denbighshire schools	Denbighshire County Council	Moel Famau Country Park
The Superlambridge	Joanne Kelly; Emily Lansley	Halton Borough Council	Runcorn station

== See also ==
- CowParade
- Larkin 25
