= Doughnut (disambiguation) =

A doughnut or donut (in American English) is a type of fried or baked good made from leavened dough.

Doughnut or donut may also refer to:

== Arts, entertainment and media ==
- Donut Media, an American automotive content brand, YouTube channel and online merchandise store
- Donuts (album), a 2006 album by J Dilla
- Dough Nuts (1917), a film starring Oliver Hardy
- "Doughnut" (song), 2021 song by Twice
- "Donut", an episode of the TV series Servant
- Donut, a character from the second season of Battle for Dream Island, an animated web series
- Princess Donut, a character from the book series Dungeon Crawler Carl

== Science and technology ==
- Doughnut shape or torus, a geometric shape
- DONUT (Direct Observation of the NU Tau, E872), a Fermilab experiment regarding the tau neutrino
- Android Donut, version 1.6 of the Android mobile operating system
- Donuts (company), a corporation formed to acquire and market domain names

== Government ==
- Donut hole (Medicare), a US insurance gap
- "The Doughnut", the nickname for the headquarters of GCHQ, the British intelligence agency

== Other uses ==
- Baseball doughnut, a baseball bat weight used for warming up
- Doughnut (driving), a driving manoeuvre
- Doughnut (economic model), a model used to measure economic performance
- Donut, a type of spare tire
- Lifebuoy or life donut, to prevent drowning

== See also ==
- Donut pillow or cushion
- Donut shop (disambiguation)
- Toroidal (disambiguation)
