= High Road (film) =

- Directed by: Matt Walsh
- Written by: Matt Walsh; Josh Weiner
- Produced by: Inman Young; Matt Walsh; Kirk Roos
- Starring: James Pumphrey; Abby Elliott; Dylan O'Brien; Lizzy Caplan; Rich Fulcher; Ed Helms; Horatio Sanz; Matt L. Jones; Andrew Daly
- Cinematography: Hillary Spera
- Edited by: Alexis Hanawalt
- Production company: Northern Lights Films
- Distributed by: Millennium Entertainment
- Release dates: April 2011 (Newport Beach International Film Festival); March 6, 2012 (United States)
- Running time: 87 minutes
- Country: United States
- Language: English

High Road is a 2011 American improvised comedy film directed by Matt Walsh, who co-wrote the screenplay with Josh Weiner. The film surrounds a young man whose loyalties are torn between his band, girlfriend, and dealing weed. Attempting to elude arrest after a drug bust, he is accompanied by his teenage runaway neighbor. It stars James Pumphrey, Abby Elliott, Dylan O'Brien, and Rob Riggle. It also premiered at the 2011 Newport Beach Film Festival, where for Matt Walsh's directing, it won an honor for Outstanding Achievement in Filmmaking.

== Plot ==
The comedy centers on Glen "Fitz" Fitzgerald, a young man, marijuana dealer, and former rock band drummer living in Los Angeles, California. His best friends dropped out of the band, Torigl, three months prior, causing the group to part and him to fall back on selling weed in his garage. He dates Monica, who works at a news company, and hangs out with his rebellious teen neighbor, Jimmy, who skips school. Fitz also believes in the "triangle theory", where everything in the world can connect in group of threes (a joke ran throughout the film). One day, after Fitz is nearly arrested in a weed bust of one of his clients, he leaves his girlfriend behind and flees to temporarily stay in Oakland, California to avoid arrest. Jimmy convinces him to join his trip so he can visit his mother there, as his father James Malone Sr plans to send him to military school for missing and failing classes.

Mistaken for a kidnap, James gets help from a police academy graduate and ally, Officer Fogerty, setting out in search for his son through their own investigation. Along the way, Jimmy attempts to keep Fitz sober, preventing Fitz from smoking. They also plot and successfully switch cars to derail the cops from tracking them by trading vehicles with Fitz's ex-band mates Sheila and Richie, who have since become a tribute band in Bakersfield, California.

Monica has become pregnant with Fitz's child, but encounters a brief affair with her married boss, Barry, the latter which she informs Fitz about. Upset Fitz left her behind, she pursues his trail. In the other pursuit, James and Officer Fogerty eventually tracks and catches up to Fitz and Jimmy, who had slept overnight in their van after visiting a diner. They are nearly captured, but Jimmy deflates their car tire and escapes with Fitz. Fitz and Jimmy have a fallout and stop at a roadside, where Jimmy trips and breaks his hand, running back to their vehicle that is being towed. Faking their names, they stop at a clinic, where the peculiar doctor suspects Fitz has kidnapped and is molesting Jimmy due to his good looks. Once Jimmy has a cast and sling on, however, he leaves with Fitz, taking a taxi ride to a bar named "Berlin" in Oakland.

At the bar, Fitz finds his estranged father, Arnie is the club owner and drag queen performer for the bar, but he thinks low of his dad. His girlfriend Monica turns up there as well and tells him she is pregnant from him, but he rejects the idea of fathering her child since she made out with her boss, before she storms off. Jimmy also admits his mom is dead. Upon the arrival of Jimmy's dad, James, and Officer Fogerty, a confrontation occurs where James attacks Fitz, believing in misinterpreted evidence he kidnapped and raped his son Jimmy. Jimmy opens up telling his dad the truth, thinking poorly of him for not being there to aid his problems, sharing the same feeling as Fitz about his father. However, they all reconcile in the end, with Fitz concluding that having a father rather than none is better. The next day, after turning down a promotion from her boss who ridicules Fitz for trying to make up with her, Monica reconnects with Fitz and the two later care for their newborn child.

== Cast ==
- James Pumphrey as Glen "Fitz" Fitzgerald
- Abby Elliott as Monica
- Dylan O'Brien as Jimmy
- Lizzy Caplan as Sheila
- Rich Fulcher as Arnie
- Ed Helms as Barry
- Joe Lo Truglio as Officer Fogerty
- Rob Riggle as James Malone Sr
- Horatio Sanz as the doctor
- Matt L. Jones as Richie
- Andrew Daly as Mr. Doobin
- Zach Woods as Tommy
- Joe Nunez as Ramón
