= Torus (disambiguation) =

A torus, pl. tori, is a type of surface.

Torus may also refer to:

== Music ==
- Torus (album), a 2013 album by Sub Focus
- Torus, a 2017 EP by Merzbow (Masami Akita)

== Science and technology ==
=== Architecture ===
- A semicircular molding – see Molding (decorative)#Types

=== Astrophysics ===
- Three-torus model of the universe, a model for describing the shape of the universe

=== Biology ===
- Receptacle (botany), the thickened part of a stem from which the flower and fruit parts grow
- Sagittal keel, or sagittal torus, a structure found in crania
- Torus, a structure of the xylem

=== Mathematics ===
- Solid torus, a solid whose surface is a torus.
- Torus knot
- Algebraic torus
- Umbilic torus
- Genus-2 surface, also called "double torus"
- Maximal torus
- Clifford torus

=== Medicine ===
- Torus palatinus, a bony growth on the palate
- Torus mandibularis, a bony growth on the mandible
- Torus tubarius, the base of the opening of Eustachian tube into the nasopharynx
- Torus fracture, a term used in radiology to describe an incomplete fracture of the distal radius in children where there is no obvious fracture line on any radiograph.

=== Nuclear physics ===
- Torus (nuclear physics), a subtype of tokamak
- Joint European Torus, an experimental nuclear fusion reactor

== Other uses ==
- TORUS Project – A United States meteorological research project
- Torus (housing association)
- Torus – a novel by James Follett – 1990
- Carnegie Mellon's Open Learning Initiative's Online Educational Platform

== See also ==
- Toroidal (disambiguation)
- Tokamak
