= Donut hole (disambiguation) =

Donut hole or doughnut hole a type of donut formed out of small round pieces of dough.

Donut hole or doughnut hole may also refer to:

- The Donut Hole, a bakery and landmark in California
- Medicare donut hole , a gap in U.S. Medicare coverage
- Donut Hole Agreement, a Bering Sea fisheries agreement
- Donut Hole (Japanese: ドーナツホール), a Japanese Vocaloid song by Kenshi Yonezu (Hachi) featuring Megpoid Gumi
- Donut Hole Trail in Pennsylvania

== See also ==
- Doughnut (disambiguation)
- Hole (disambiguation)
