= Trochilics =

Trochilics is the science of rotary motion, or work done with wheels.

Trochilics may also refer to:

- Trochilic Engine, a type of Swing-piston engine conceptualized in the 1990s but never built
