= Yo-Mobile =

ё-AUTO Limited
- Industry: Automotive
- Founded: 12 April 2010 as CITY CAR Limited
- Headquarters: Moscow, Russia
- Divisions: ё-AUTO ё-ENGINEERING
- Website: none

Yo-mobile
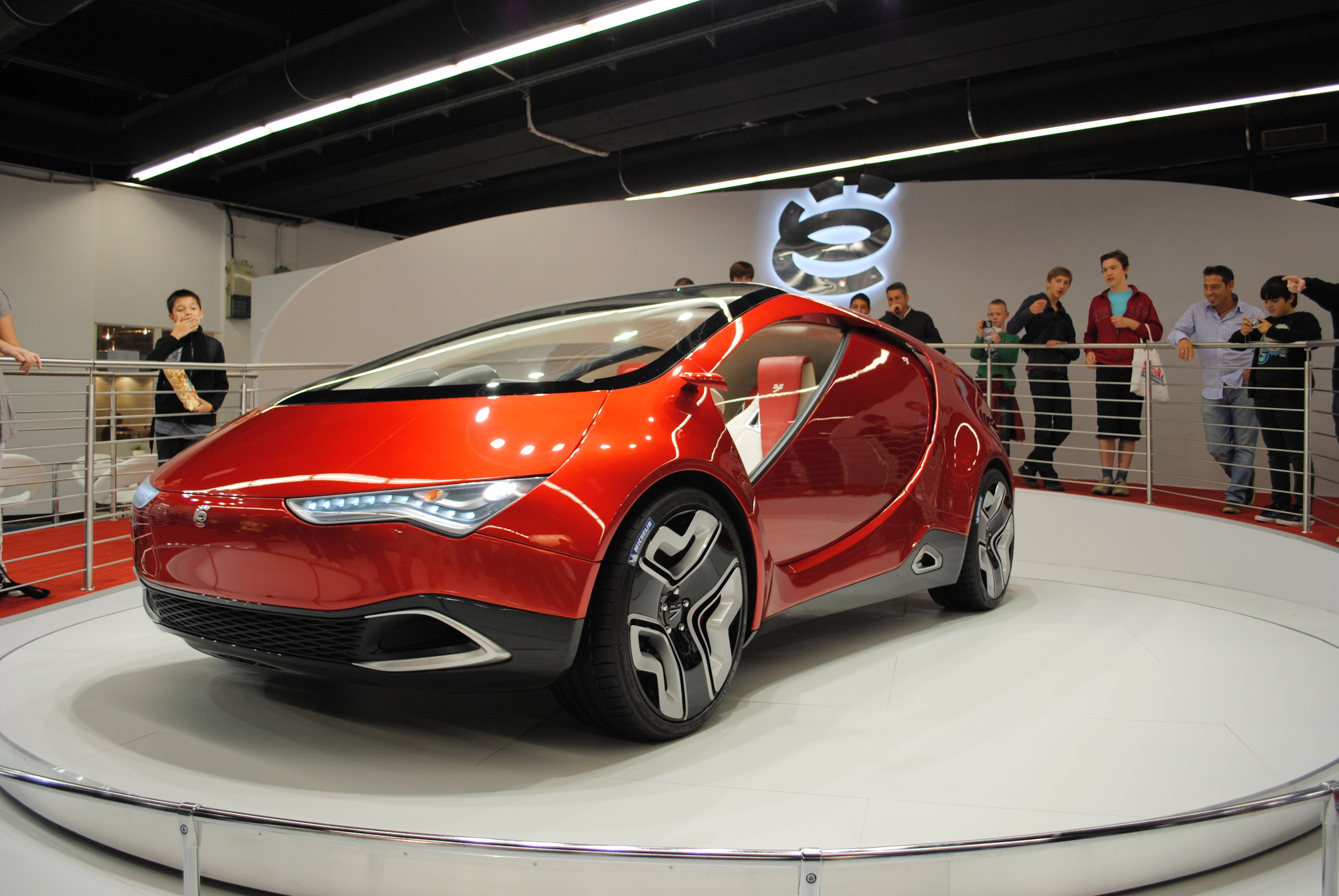

Overview
- Manufacturer: ё-AUTO
- Production: cancelled

Body and chassis
- Body style: Crossover, hatchback, truck

Powertrain
- Engine: Gasoline or natural gas hybrid

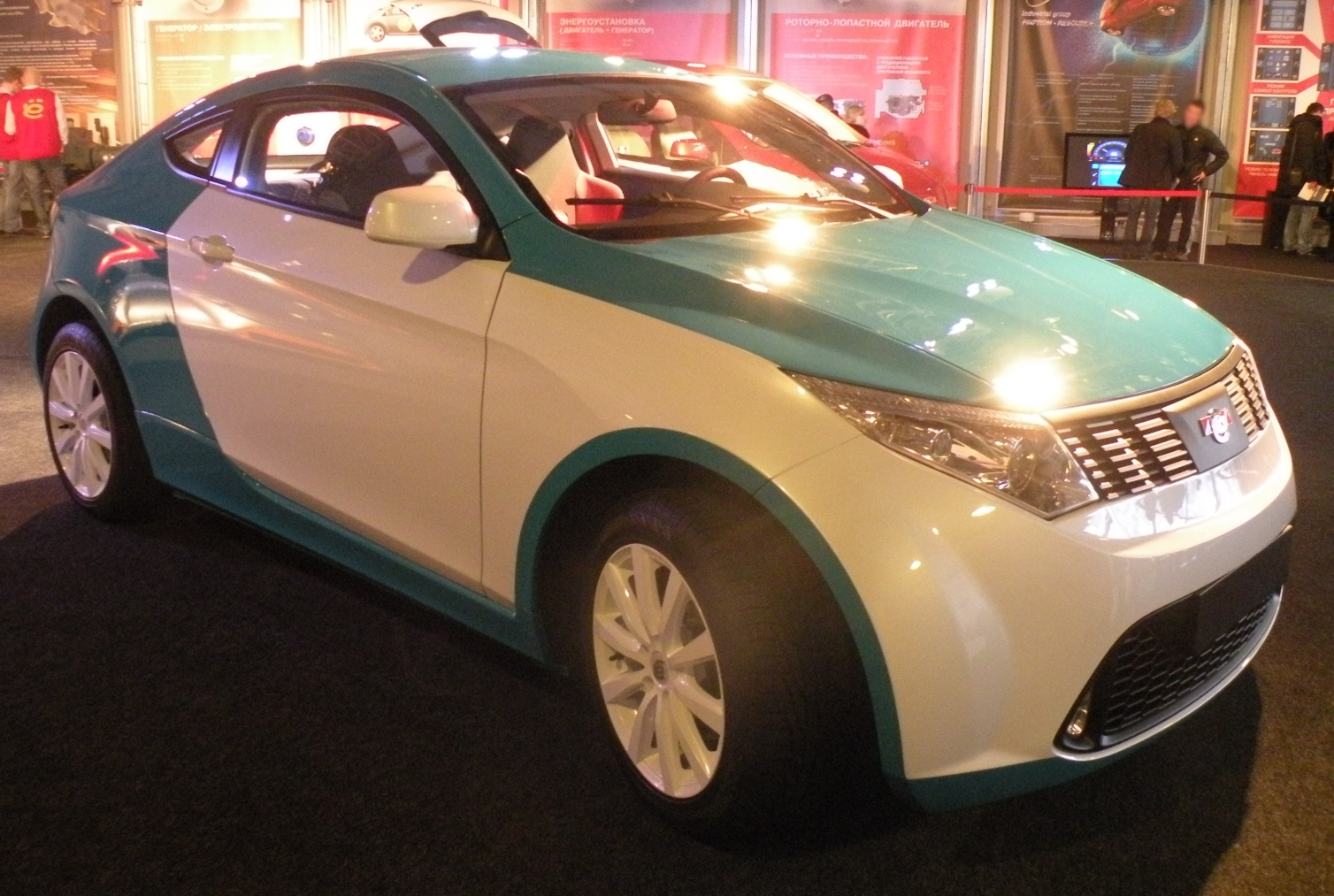
Yo-mobile coupe

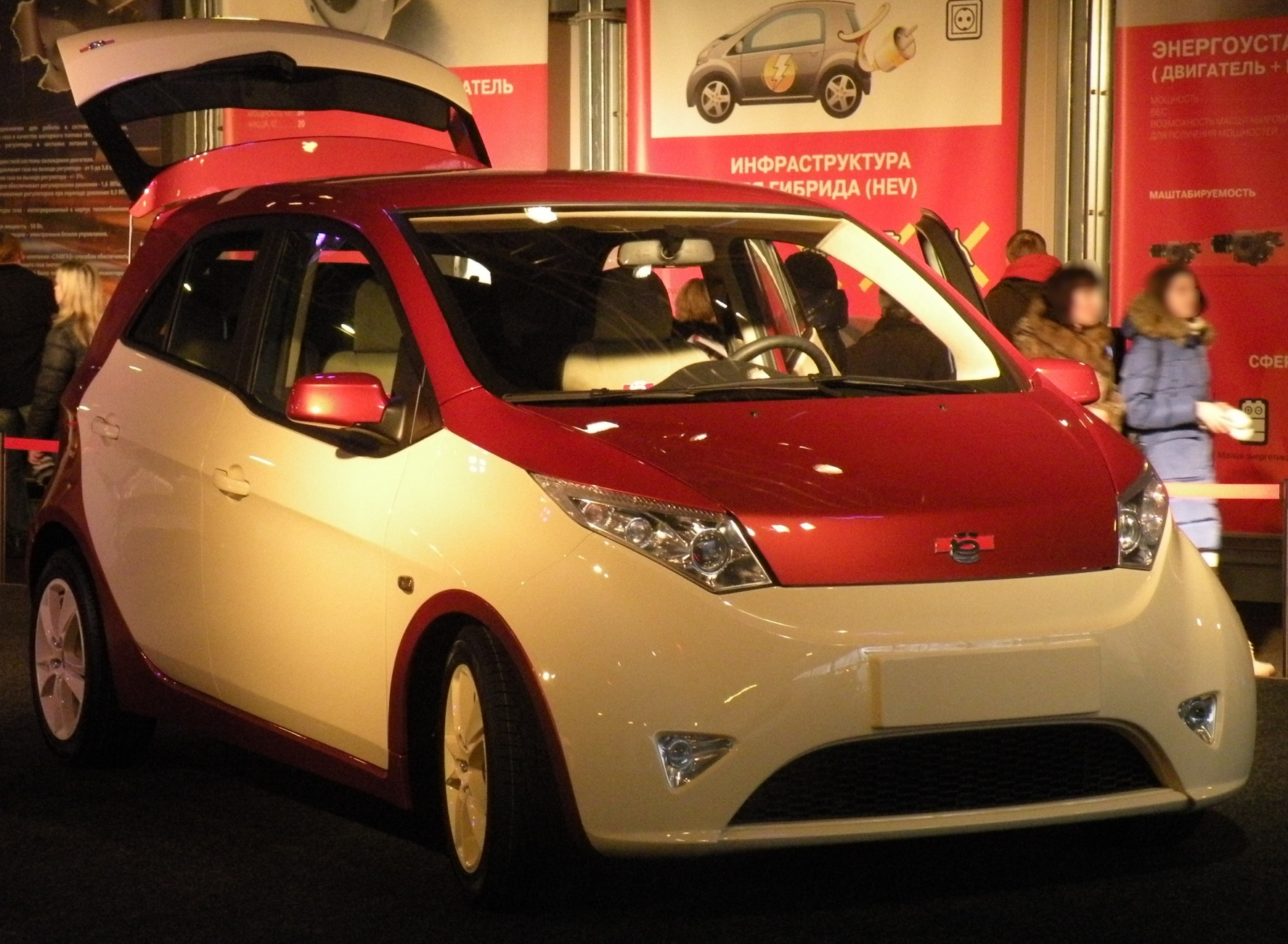
Yo-mobile hatchback

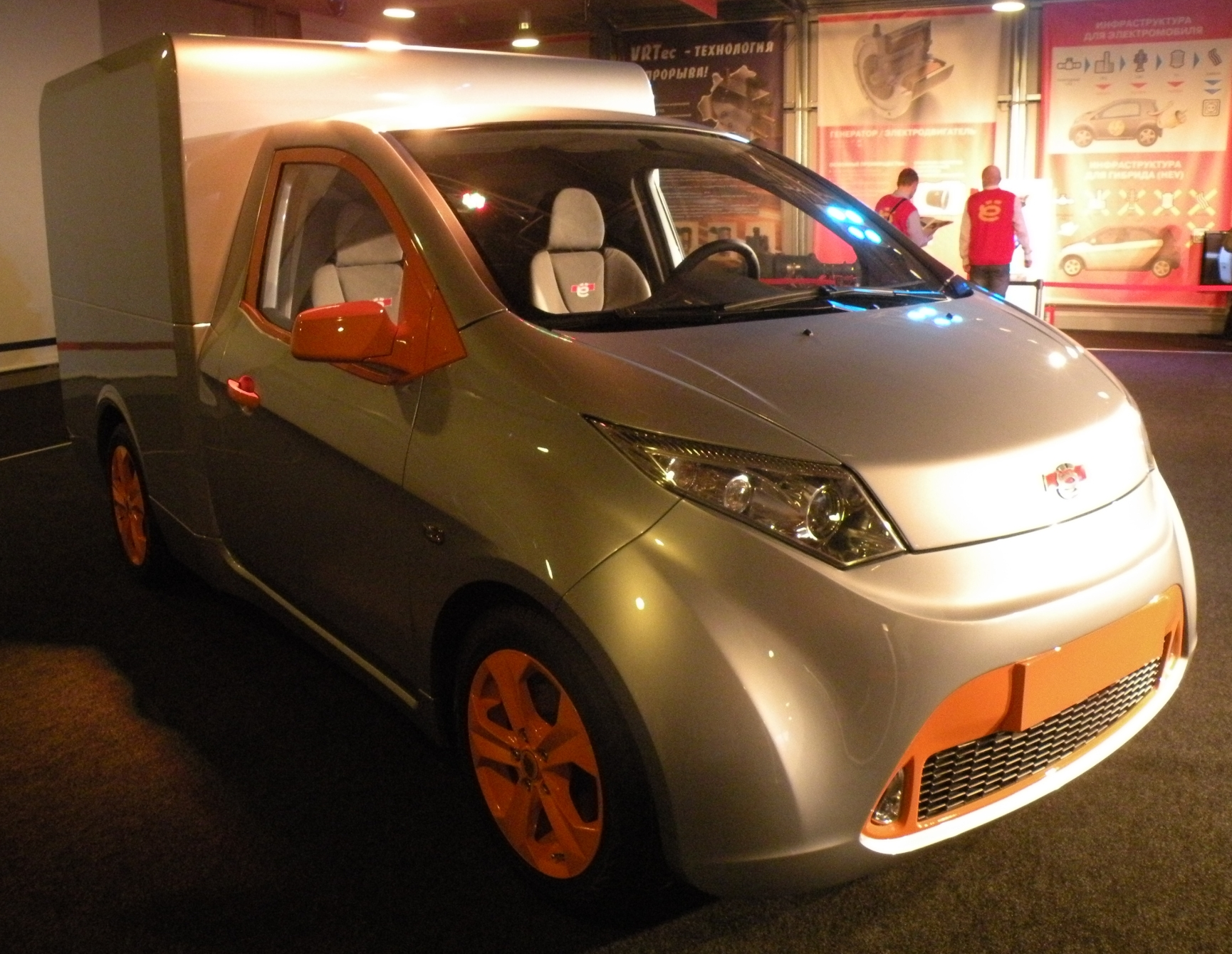
Yo-mobile truck

The Yo-mobile (Russian: ё-мобиль, IPA: [ˈjɵ mɐˈbʲilʲ], Yo-mobil) was a planned series type hybrid electric car that was going to be produced by the Russian Yo-auto. The company was a joint venture between SKD truck maker Yarovit and the ONEXIM investment group.

On 7 April 2014 it was announced that the project was sold to the Russian government for €1. As of 2017, no production vehicles were ever manufactured.

== Background ==
The car was introduced on 13 December 2010 in Moscow, a product of a joint venture between Yarovit, owner of a small assembly plant in St. Petersburg, Russia and the Onexim investment group, headed by Mikhail Prokhorov, who is the leader and financier of the project. Prokhorov planned to invest around €150 million (US$200 million) in a venture, dubbed Yo-auto. According to Prokhorov, he intended for the vehicle to "break the stereotype saying Russia can't produce good cars."

== Design ==
The car was designed to be powered by an engine that can burn both gasoline and natural gas. The series hybrid no-transmission layout uses an electric generator that feeds its power directly into the car's two rear electric motors, unlike parallel hybrid cars like the Toyota Prius. A super capacitor would provide a small but powerful energy buffer. It was planned to install a rotary vane type engine, with the pistons moving in a circle, rather than linearly.

The design includes a plastic body that can be recycled to make other structural components. Another feature is the ability for the vehicle to become a 20 kW power station for a house or business during a grid failure.

Fuel economy of the car was expected to be around 67 mpg_{‑US} (3.5 L/100 km; 80 mpg_{‑imp}), with a range of 680 miles (1,090 km) and a top speed of 80 mph (130 km/h). However, no tests were conducted due to the lack of working examples.

== Criticism ==
The project has been criticized by Russian automotive specialists. for a number of reasons:

- Overly ambitious plans for a company that has never designed or produced vehicles before; Yarovit only did Complete knock down assembly of trucks based on large Terberg components.
- Designing a vehicle around high-tech components (engine) that do not exist even in experimental status
- High center of gravity, making it susceptible to roll-over
- Archaic design, resembling go-carts by its body and mining equipment by the drivetrain
- Use of capacitors as power storage devices which have numerous disadvantages and may become dangerous in certain circumstances
- Dynamic driving properties declared earlier may not match practicals due to power leak caused by additional electric equipment (like lights, air conditioning etc.).
- No physical safety tests results were announced as of June 2012.

The inventor of the engine Mikhail Virgiyanov in an open letter to the company later refused to continue work on the engine and accused the company of copyright infringement.

== History ==
Yo-auto initially planned to begin producing the car during the second half of 2012, and had aims to sell 10,000 during the first year of production. However, these plans were revised in 2012, with the estimated start of production was moved to early 2015, a plan that never came to fruition. While it will be initially sold in Russia, Yo-auto planned to sell the vehicle in Europe subject to compliance with European Union regulations. The cars was to be manufactured in a factory near St. Petersburg that would have an estimated annual capacity of 45,000 units. A second factory, to be opened later, was expected to double the annual production rate. However, these plans were also revised in 2013, with the estimated total annual production rate were targeted at 40,000 units.

In late 2011, Vietnamese company TMT and Yo-auto announced plans to develop a line of 2-8 seat cars for the Vietnam market, developed from the Yo-mobil platform.

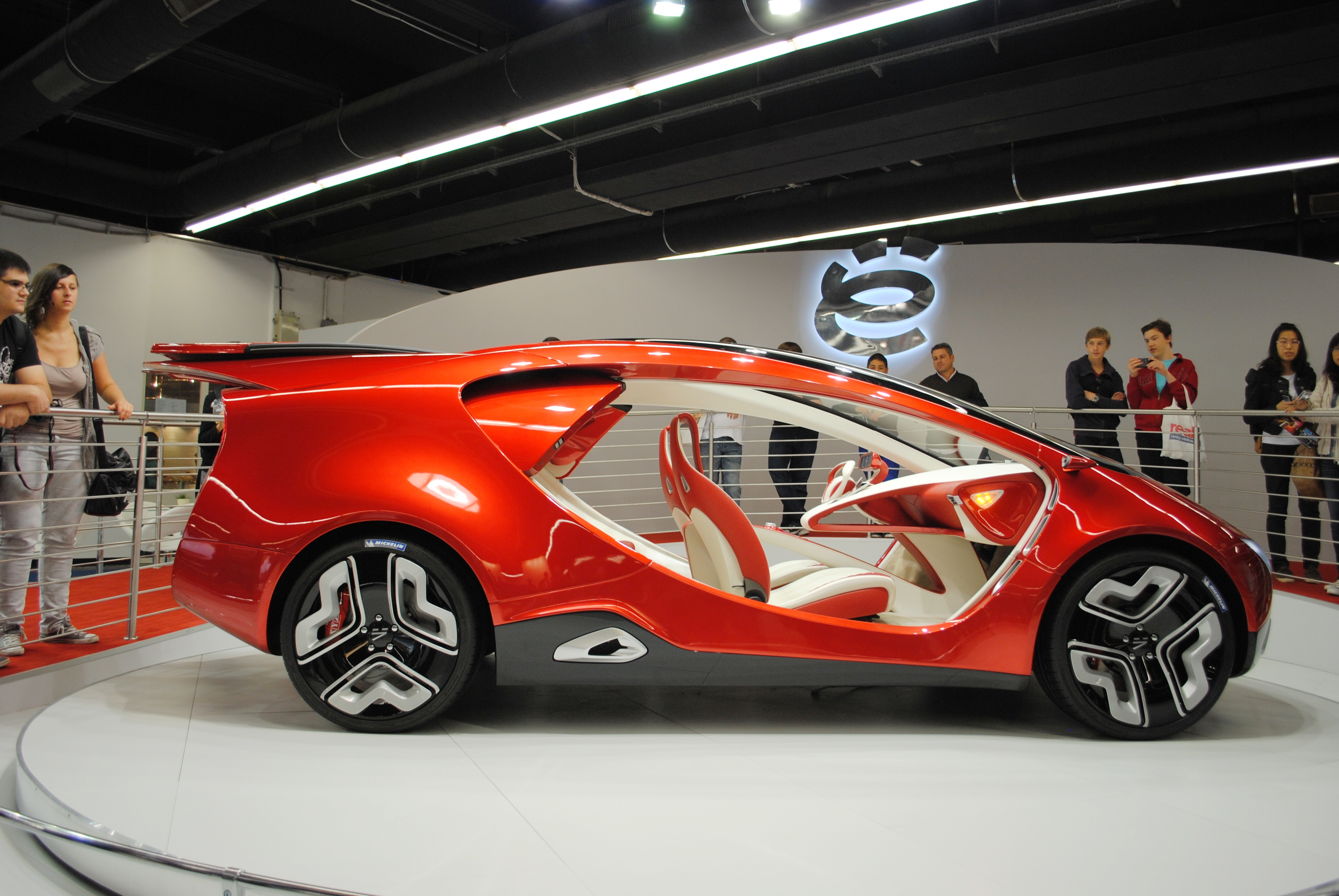
2011 Yo-mobile concept car

At the 2011 Frankfurt Motor Show, yo-Auto presented a concept yo-mobil with sliding doors. Instead of mirrors, the concept utilized a pair of video cameras for rear view vision.

In 2012 Mikhail Prokhorov presented Vladimir Zhirinovsky of the LDPR party with a gift of an advanced model of the Ё-Mobile, the ё-Crossback EV, for his 2012 election campaign.

In August 2013 the official website of ё-ENGINEERING has been started, it is offline as of August 2017.

On 7 April 2014 ONEXIM announced the transfer of Yo-Mobile technologies to the government-owned research institute NAMI for a symbolical price of 1 euro. It also announced its intention to sell the Yo-Mobile Saint-Petersburg plants. ONEXIM explained the decision by the weakening of the Russian rouble and recent decline of the auto-market in Russia.
