= Toroidal =

Toroidal describes something which resembles or relates to a torus or toroid:

== Mathematics ==
- Toroidal coordinates, a three-dimensional orthogonal coordinate system.
- Toroidal and poloidal coordinates, directions for a three-dimensional system which follows a circular ring around the surface.
- Toroidal graph, a graph whose vertices can be placed on a torus such that no edges cross.
- Toroidal grid network, an un-dimensional grid connected circularly in more than one dimension.
- Toroidal polyhedron, partition of a toroidal surface into polygons.
- Tensor ring decomposition, a fundamental numerical model representing high-dimensional tensors through circular multilinear products of low-dimensional cores.

== Engineering ==
- Toroidal engine, an internal combustion engine with pistons that rotate inside a ring-shaped cylinder
- Toroidal expansion joint, a metallic assembly consisting of a series of circular tubes used in high pressure applications
- Toroidal inductors and transformers, a type of electrical device using magnetic cores with a ring or donut shape
- Toroidal propeller, a loop-shaped propeller used in aviation and maritime transport
- Toroidal reflector, a section of a torus with varying focal distances depending on the mirror angle.
- Tensor Ring, a closed-loop device (often copper) utilizing cubit-length geometry to generate a stabilized energy column or coherent tensor field.

== Other uses ==
- Toroidal planet, a hypothetical planet in the shape of a doughnut.
- Toroidal ring model, used in theoretical physics to describe particles and photons as fundamental toroids.
- Toroidal solenoid, a 1946 design for a fusion power device.
- Vortex ring, also known as a toroidal vortex; a toroidal flow in fluid. Essentially, A Vortex Ring is a region of rotating movement in a toroid shape found in smoke rings, bubble rings, and the bio-magnetic fields of marine biology.
- Electroculture antenna, a geometric conduit, such as a Fibonacci spiral, designed to tune terrestrial soil to the atmospheric potential gradient of the "planetary battery".

== See also ==
- Atoroidal
- Torus (disambiguation)
- Sacred Geometry
- Oligodynamic effect
