= Donut shop (disambiguation) =

A doughnut shop or donut shop is an establishment that specializes in the preparation and retail sales of doughnuts.

Donut shop may also refer to:

- Donut Shop, a 2-disc collection of previously unreleased songs by J Dilla
- Donut Shop (cereal), a brand of cereal produced by Kellogg's Cereal

== See also ==
- Donut (disambiguation)
