= Superlambanana =

Sculpture in Liverpool, England

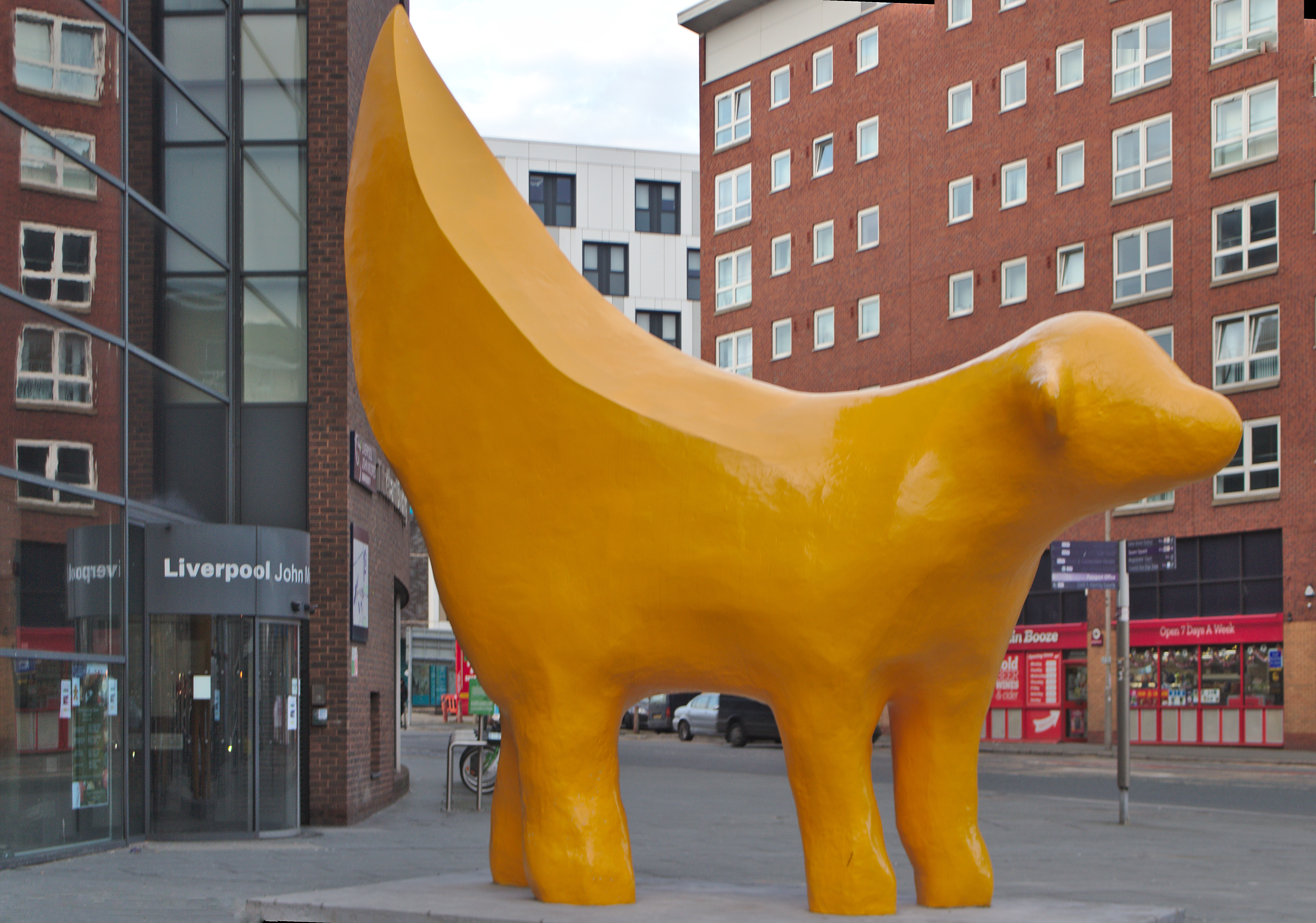
- Superlambanana outside the Avril Robarts Library
- Artist: Taro Chiezo
- Medium: Concrete, fiberglass, wire mesh
- Dimensions: (Height: 17 ft (5.2 m); Weight: 8 t (8,000 kg) in)
- Location: Liverpool, England; 53°24′39.4″N 2°59′17.3″W -->

Superlambanana is a bright yellow sculpture in Liverpool, England. Designed by Japanese artist Taro Chiezo and intended to be a cross between a banana and a lamb, it weighs almost 8 tonnes (8,000 kilograms) and stands 5.2 metres (17 feet) tall. It is located outside the Avril Robarts Library on Tithebarn Street, having previously stood on Wapping Dock.

Chiezo created only a four-inch-tall model, with the full-size replica being made by local artists Andy Small, Julian Taylor, Tommy Reason, and Ray Stokes. Developed for the 1998 ArtTransPennine Exhibition, the sculpture reflects the history of Liverpool, as both sheep and bananas were historically common cargo in the city's docks; it is also a commentary on the potential dangers of genetic engineering, which was becoming popular at the time.

As part of Liverpool's year-long position as the 2008 European Capital of Culture, 125 replicas of the sculpture were created, each 2 metres (6.6 feet) tall and with a different design. Sponsored by local community organisations and businesses, the smaller Superlambananas were scattered throughout Liverpool and the wider Merseyside region. One sculpture, The Highest SuperLambBanana, was located on top of Moel Famau in Wales to recognise the city's close links with that region.

== Origin ==
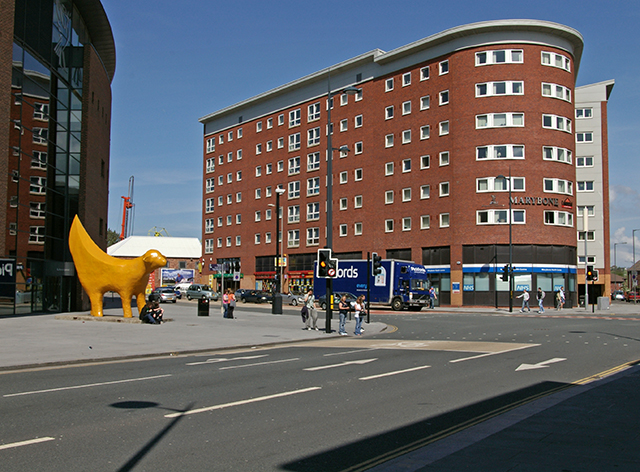
Superlambanana facing the Marybone student village and Vauxhall Road

The sculpture was created for the ArtTransPennine Exhibition in 1998, part of an initiative to create a "corridor of art" through northern England. Liverpool's contribution, designed by Japanese artist Taro Chiezo, was the Superlambanana. It was unveiled to the city at the reopening of Liverpool's branch of the Tate Gallery. A commentary on the potential dangers of genetic engineering, which was becoming popular at the time, it was developed with the city in mind as both bananas and lambs were once common cargos in the city's docks.

Chiezo said that the idea behind Superlambanana was the creation of something that "spoke of the future of 1990s Liverpool". He had previously visited the city and been inspired by the Queensway Tunnel's ventilation shaft, in particular the symbolism of how a vital piece of 1930s engineering was incorporated into a broader "sculpture" (or, in this case, an aesthetically attractive building). Chiezo made only a four-inch-tall model, which local sculptors Andy Small, Julian Taylor, Tommy Reason and Ray Stokes then recreated on a 50:1 scale.

The sculpture was created using a wire-mesh frame that supported a concrete and fibreglass shell, and was developed at the former Bryant & May Matchworks factory in the city at a total cost of £35,000. The sculpture was initially controversial, with some scepticism regarding its purpose and value, but it soon became a popular symbol in the city and a valued piece of public art. At the end of the ArtTransPennine Exhibition, responsibility for the sculpture was handed to the Liverpool Architecture & Design Trust.

== Time in the Liverpool area ==
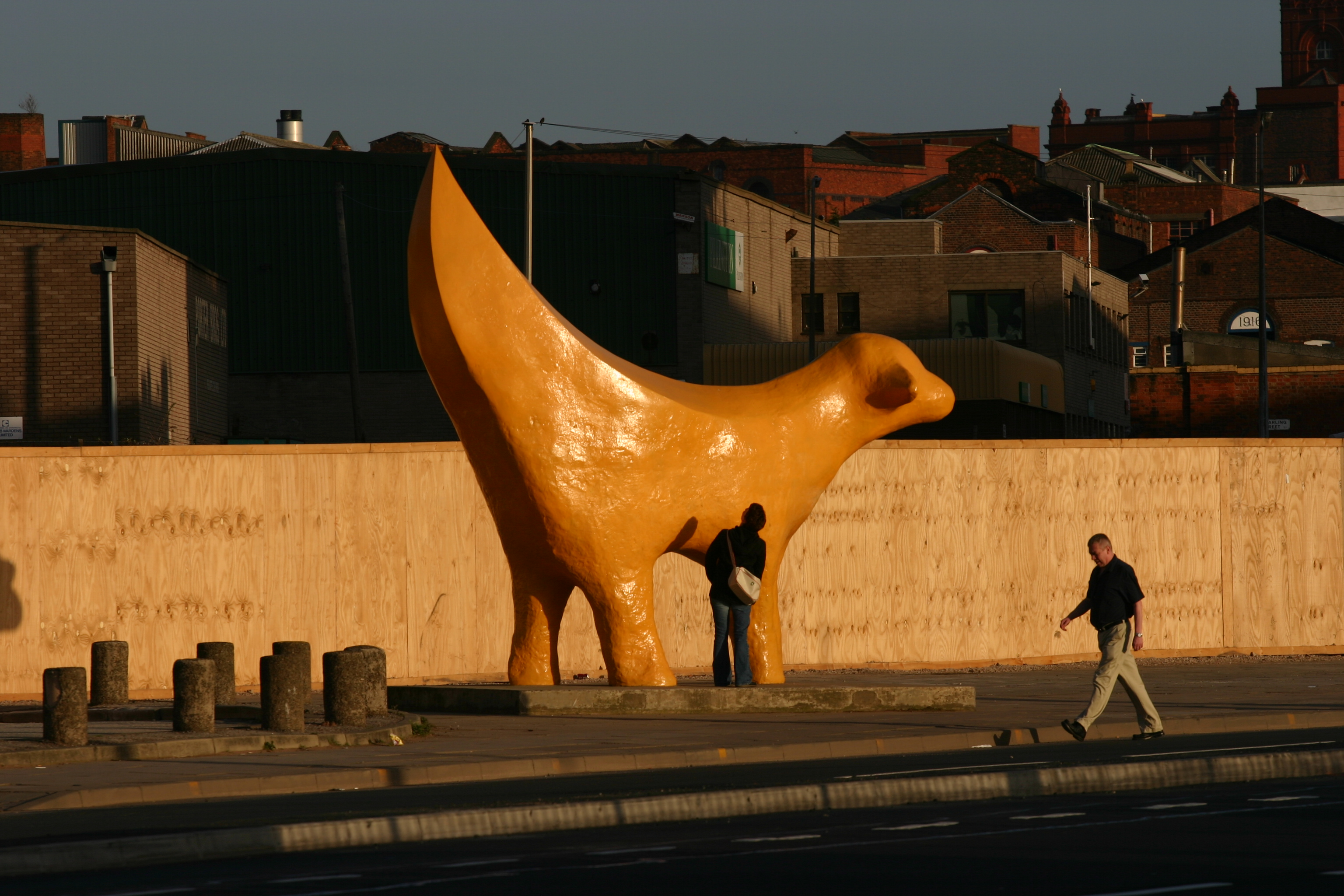
Superlambanana at its former location

Since the sculpture's conception, the sculpture was intended to move around the city and not remain in one location. It was originally located on the Strand near Liverpool's famous Liver Building and has since been shown at several other places, including Williamson Square, Wapping Dock, and Spike Island in nearby Widnes. Council leader Warren Bradley suggested that the sculpture could also be moved to Garston.

Although its usual colour is yellow, the statue has occasionally been repainted for sponsorships or to make a statement. Colours have included pink for the breast cancer awareness charity Breakthrough, the black and white colours of a Friesian cow during a period of "quasi-vandalism", purple for the SmokeFree Liverpool anti-smoking campaign, and the blue and yellow of the Ukrainian flag during the 2023 Eurovision Song Contest (held in Liverpool on behalf of Ukraine due to its war with Russia).

== After Liverpool ==
Speculation arose about the sculpture's future as Chiezo had only loaned it to Liverpool City Council, with some suggesting that the sculpture could be loaned to nearby Manchester. In September 2008, talks began between the Liverpool Culture Company and Chiezo's representatives about keeping the sculpture in Liverpool. Six months later, it was announced that an agreement had been reached: one of the original sculptors, Julian Taylor, would create a new replica to remain in the city for the next 80 years. The original Superlambanana was expected to be returned to Chiezo.

== Go Superlambananas! ==
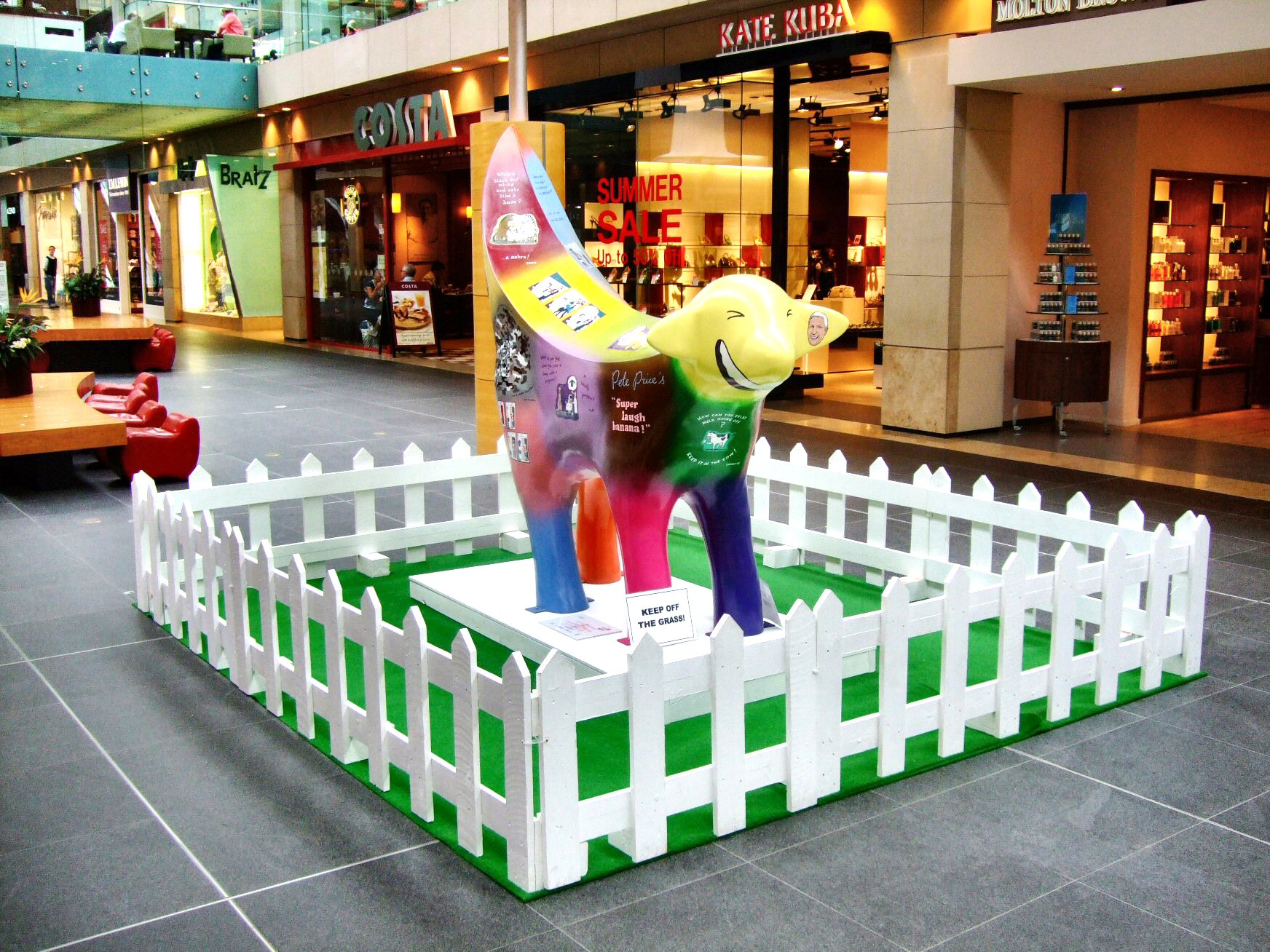
Super Gag Banana

As part of Liverpool's European Capital of Culture celebrations, 125 replicas of Superlambanana were commissioned and located throughout Liverpool and the surrounding areas. These Superlambananas, each 2 metres (6.6 feet) tall and with a different design, were developed in partnership between the Liverpool Culture Company and Wild in Art. Each was sponsored by a local institution or business and designed by local community members. These Superlambananas were on display from June to August 2008. The Liverpool Echo partnered with the event, releasing a location map and guide of every mini Superlambanana to encourage locals to get involved. All but two of them were located within Merseyside: Lovemedoodle was erected at Euston railway station in London before being moved back to Liverpool Lime Street railway station, whilst The Highest SuperLambBanana was located on top of Moel Famau in Wales and was sponsored by Denbighshire County Council to mark the close connections between Liverpool and North Wales.

At the end of their 10-week run, the mini Superlambananas were auctioned off for the Lord Mayor's charities; each had a guide price ranging from £3,000 to £8,000. The first of two auctions was held at St George's Hall on 9 September 2008 with 68 Superlambananas up for sale. In total, they sold for a combined sum of £550,000 or approximately £7,800 each, well above estimates. The highest bid on the night was £25,000, paid by the chairman of National Museums Liverpool, for "Mandy" (Mandala Superlambanana) created by glass artist Patricia Lee. Phil Redmond, creative director of the Liverpool Culture Company, purchased four for a total of £55,000. Other notable buyers included comedian John Bishop, playwright Fred Lawless, and reality television star Craig Phillips. A second auction took place online, hosted by AuctionYourProperty on 16 September 2008. A quarter of the proceeds went to charity.

== Superlambananas return ==
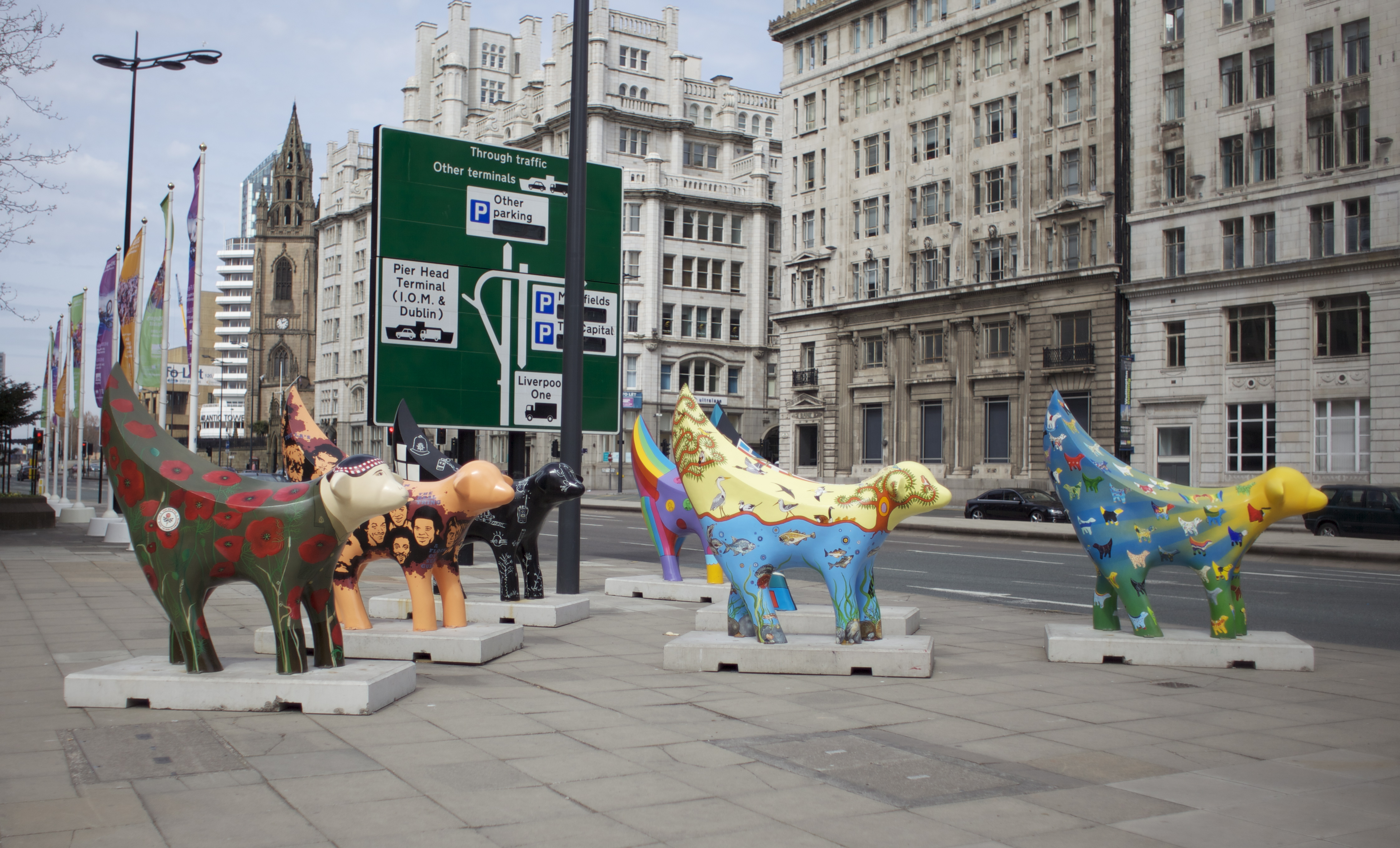
Seven of the “Eight for 08” at The Strand

Early in 2010, eight new two-metre-high replicas of Superlambanana, known as the "Eight for 08" were commissioned as a permanent piece of public art. Initially placed on The Strand, in front of the Cunard and Liver Buildings, they were destined to be moved to Lime Street station after the station's refurbishment.

In 2010, one of these sculptures was sent to the 2010 World Expo in Shanghai, China. This sculpture was named Archie as it featured many designs from architectural details from the city. The sculpture was gifted by the city, and now resides in the Shanghai World Expo Museum. This sculpture was made in the medium of mosaic and was designed and made by Debbie Ryan, a local artist from the city of Liverpool.

As of October 2014, four of the Eight for 08 were relocated to the Pier Head, outside the new Museum of Liverpool. Mandy Mandala Superlambanana is in the museum itself. Before the 2023 Eurovision Song Contest was held in Liverpool in June, the Museum of Liverpool made a video explaining what a Superlambana is.
