= Taro Chiezo =

Japanese artist based in Manhattan

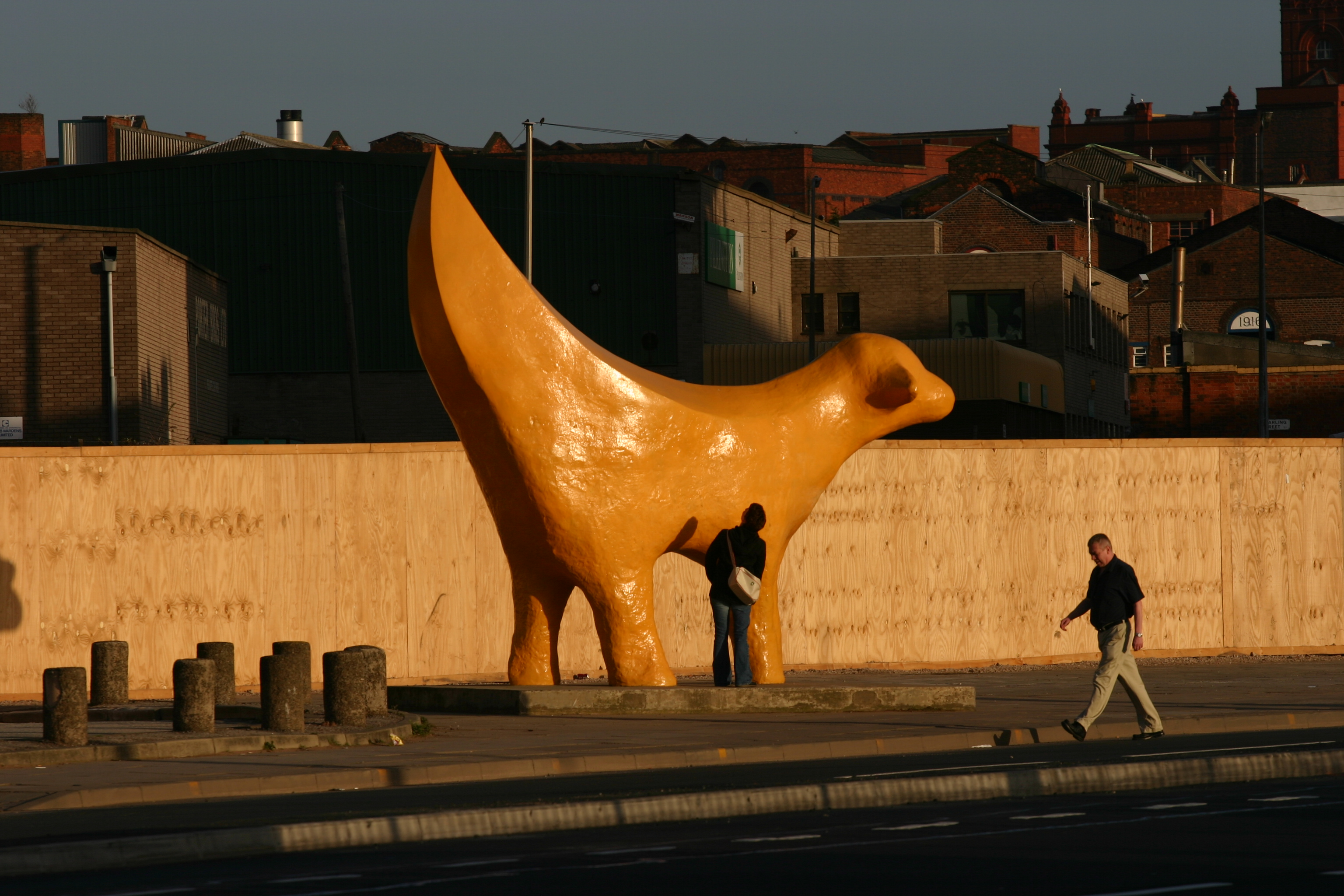
Superlambanana

Taro Chiezo (Japanese 千恵藏 太郎; Hepburn Chiezō Tarō; born 1962) is a Japanese artist based in Manhattan. He is best known for designing Superlambanana, a sculpture in Liverpool of a lamb and banana combined.

Chiezo created the original Superlambanana design in 1998, inspired by the city's docks (where bananas and sheep were once common cargo) and as a commentary on the potential dangers of genetic engineering, which was becoming popular at the time. He produced a four-inch-tall model to be replicated on a 50:1 scale by local sculptors Andy Small, Julian Taylor, Tommy Reason, and Ray Stokes, with the final product weighing almost 8 tonnes (8,000 kilograms) and standing 5.2 metres (17 feet) tall.
