= Donut Media =

American YouTube channel

Donut
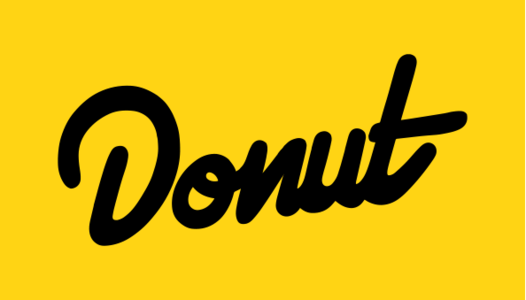

YouTube information
- Channel: Donut
- Years active: 2015–present
- Genres: Automobiles; Comedy
- Subscribers: 9.26 million
- Views: 3.02 billion
- Last updated: 24 April 2026

Donut Media, also known simply as Donut, is an American automotive YouTube channel. Real Mechanic Stuff is a secondary channel.

== History ==
Donut Media was founded in 2015 by Matt Levin, a former product head at AwesomenessTV, Ben Conrad, and Nick Moceri. The channel's first video was about the 24 Hours of Lemons. It achieved early viral success with its 2016 video Two Grannies, One Lamborghini, which for many years was the channel's most-viewed video.

In February 2016, Up to Speed "debuted" with a video describing nine must-know facts about the Nissan 240SX.

In February 2018, Donut Media tried to recreate the Elon Musk's Tesla Roadster stunt by sending a Hot Wheels Tesla Roadster car into space.

In May 2018, Donut Media received $800,000 in seed funding in a round led by Techstars Ventures. In November of that year, it partnered with NASCAR to offer lighthearted racing-related content.

Between 2018 and 2020, the channel saw breakout success due to its "Up To Speed" series. In the series, host James Pumphrey explains the origins of automotive models, brands, and other car related items with cult followings such as the Nissan GT-R, Plymouth Barracuda, and Suzuki Samurai. According to Levin, "Up To Speed" marked the moment Donut Media moved from dependence on viral one-offs to having a sustainable content model.

In June 2021, Donut Media released a Kickstarter project called Stocky which is a series of collectable toy cars based on real cars, but the Stocky toys have cartoonish proportions, similar to Hot Wheels's Tooned line of toy cars. Stocky debuted on Donut's channel on their Up to Speed video about Type R. The first Stocky made was an Acura Integra Type R.

On November 9, 2021, Donut Media was acquired by Recurrent Ventures, a digital media company which also owns The Drive and Car Bibles automotive content brands, as well as Popular Photography and Outdoor Life.

In November 2022, Donut Media partnered with Forza Horizon 5 for the 14th Festival Playlist, also adding a new story simply called 'Donut'. In June 2023, Donut Media partnered with the game again, adding another story called Donut Media Hi-Low, named after their show of the same name.

In September 2023, The Crew Motorfest released, adding a Donut Media playlist at launch, called Rule The Streets: Presented By Donut.

On June 21, 2024, long time hosts Jeremiah Burton and Zach Jobe announced they would leave Donut Media to start their own channel BigTime.

On August 2, 2024, James Pumphrey also announced that he would be leaving Donut Media and that he would start an independent YouTube channel called Speeed with his friend Jesse Wood.

On July 27, 2026 Donut Podcasts released an ominous message via their Instagram Story that simply stated "Thanks for listening all these years. Bye." Host Joe Weber confirmed that the podcast division of Donut Media had been closed, which resulted in layoffs.

== Awards and nominations ==
| Year | Award | Category | Result | Ref. |
|---|---|---|---|---|
| 2018 | 8th Streamy Awards | Sports | Nominated | |
| 2019 | 9th Streamy Awards | Sports | Won | |
| 2020 | 12th Shorty Awards | Instructional | Nominated | |

== Discontinued Shows ==
=== Money Pit ===
Uploaded every other Wednesday, Money Pit was a show where Zach Jobe (host) added upgrades and modifications to his Mazda Miata or, more recently, a BMW 3 Series. The show also featured DIY tutorials for working on project cars. The Mazda Miata's modification focuses mainly on trackable daily use, and the BMW 3 Series's modification focused on rallying. In February 2024, Donut introduced a new project, a 1996 Ford Ranger that they will be modifying to be a trophy truck.

=== HiLow ===
Formerly uploaded every Sunday, James Pumphrey and Nolan Sykes (the main hosts of the show) purchased nearly identical vehicles and modified them to be fun daily drivers that you could take to the track, with either cheap or expensive parts. For the first seasons, James' "Hi Team" modified their Nissan 350Z with expensive parts while Nolan's "Low Team" used cheap parts. The second season featured a pair of Toyota Tacomas and the same team dynamics with the goal of creating "A truck that can Literally Go Anywhere". In November 2022, the third season began with the goal of turning Subaru WRXs into Time attack cars. During season three, both cars suffered reliability issues, leading to several blown engines. James also totaled Hi car while attempting to set a lap time. In 2023, a story was added to Forza Horizon 5 based on HiLow. Season four ran from August to December 20, 2024, where the teams modified a pair of Ford Mustang GTs for drag racing.

=== Past Gas ===
Uploaded every Sunday on Donut Media's secondary channel, Donut Podcasts, Past Gas is a podcast that talks about important and significant events in automotive history. The podcast's main hosts include Nolan John Sykes, James Pumphrey (formerly), and Joe Weber. Past Gas can also be heard on various podcast apps.

=== Wheelhouse ===
Formerly uploaded every Monday, Wheelhouse is a show which covers various topics that are related to automobiles, and sometimes talks about recent automotive news. This show is hosted by Nolan Sykes.

=== Bumper 2 Bumper ===
Formerly uploaded every Tuesday, Bumper 2 Bumper (also known as "B2B") is a show that goes into detail about the engineering and technology of various cars and other technical automotive topics. The current B2B is similar to Science Garage, which is another Donut Media show. This show is hosted by Jeremiah Burton. Previously hosted by multiple hosts (most notably James Pumphrey), Bumper 2 Bumper was a show that covered the details of famous and well-known cars. The show was later transferred to Jeremiah, and due to the COVID-19 pandemic, the format was changed to technical automotive topics.

=== Up to Speed ===
Formerly uploaded every Thursday, Up to Speed is a show that goes into detail about the history of various cars, brands, and other car-related items, with humor in most episodes. It goes into detail about why they were created, how they were used, and how they came to be. This show is hosted by James Pumphrey. His extreme passion about cars and the automotive world shines through in this segment. Up to Speed "debuted" in 2016 when Donut uploaded a video on 9 facts about the Nissan 240SX. The real Up to Speed show debuted in 2017 with a video talking about the Nissan Skyline.

=== D-List ===
Formerly uploaded every Friday, D-List is a show that covers certain types of cars and other car-related topics in a list-style format. This show is hosted by James Pumphrey. Sometimes, other Donut hosts or non-Donut guests host the show with James.

=== Science Garage ===
Science Garage was hosted by Bart Bidlingmeyer from February 2017 to January 2019, Bart left Donut in April 2019 to work for Kelley Blue Book and Motor Trend. Each episode of the show covered a specific automobile part or mechanism in great detail and included the science behind it. The show contributed to Donut Media's early popularity. The current iteration of Bumper 2 Bumper is an unofficial "sequel" to Science Garage.

=== Miracle Whips ===
Miracle Whips was hosted by Byron Bowers from June 2018 to October 2018. The purpose of the show was to find Byron his "Miracle Whip", which he defines as a car that someone would be comfortable owning and driving every day for the rest of their life. The show ends when Byron chooses his Miracle Whip in the last episode, a Nissan GTR R35. At the end of the last episode, he hints at a second season coming soon, however there have been no updates since.

=== Donut Racing Show (DRS) ===
Donut Racing Show (DRS) was an F1 based podcast hosted by Nolan Sykes and automotive journalists Alanis King and Elizabeth Blackstock, authors of the book Racing with Rich Energy.

=== Tool Party ===
Formerly uploaded every Wednesday, Tool Party is a series where tools of different price ranges (or occasionally As Seen On TV tools) are tested to their absolute limits. Tool Party debuted in 2022 when Donut uploaded a video where they test different impact wrenches of different price ranges. The series is primarily sponsored by eBay Motors.

== Cars ==
=== 1995 Honda Civic "$500 Civic" ===
Bought originally for US$500 in December 2022, featured on the series named "Money Pit", and fitted with over $50,000 worth of aftermarket performance parts (Spoon Sports Brakes, Honda "K20" Engine, Individual Throttle Bodies, Recaro Seats, etc.), the main focus of this car was to make enough horsepower and torque to beat the newest generation Honda Civic Type R (FL5).
