= Honda Type R =

Special performance editions of Honda car model families

Honda Type R models are special performance editions of their respective model families.

The design of Type R models was originally focused on race conditions, with an emphasis on minimizing weight, and maximizing performance potential (e.g. engine tuning, suspension set-up). Thus, Type R models were first conceived for racetracks. However, due to Honda's increased focus on their VTEC engines, Type R vehicles were eventually designed for a much wider market.

Type R vehicles traditionally have a red Honda badge and Championship White paint as an option, as a tribute to their first winning F1 car. Honda's racing and F1 cars often feature a red Honda badge.

The Type R was utilised by Acura on their high performance vehicles, which evolved into Type-S for selected models.

== NSX Type R ==
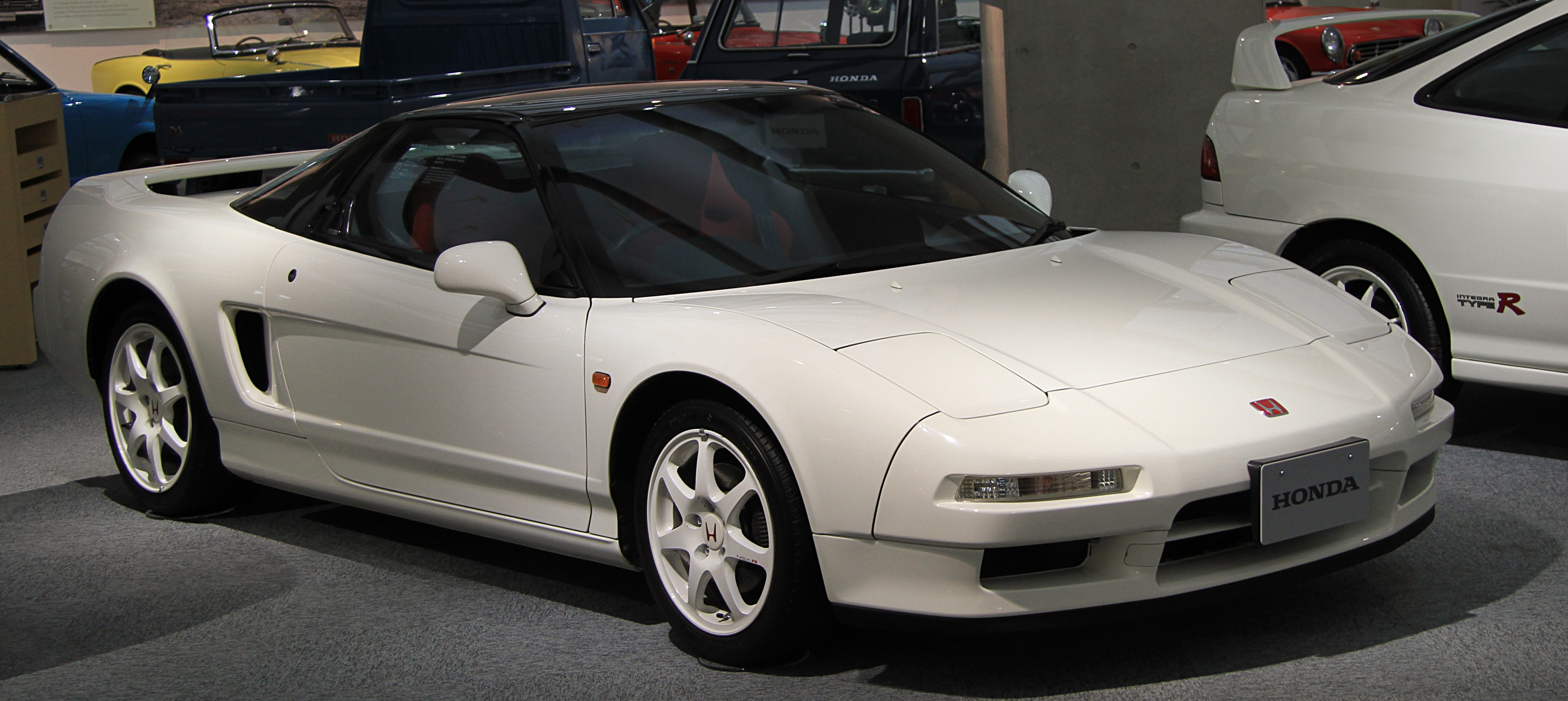
1992 NSX Type R

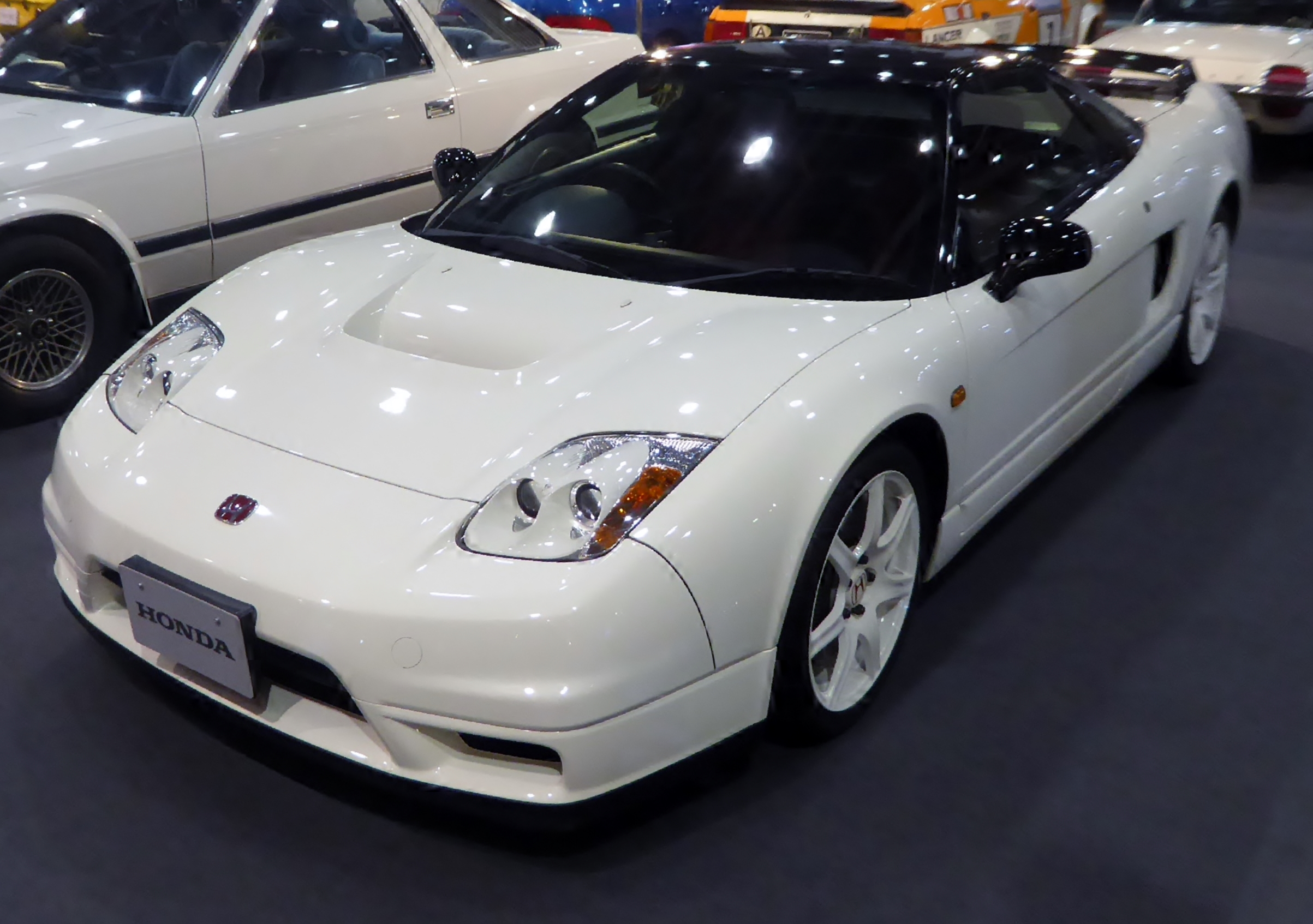
2002 NSX-R

Honda produced a very limited number of NSX Type R models from 1992 to 1995 for Japan. Major changes include a more aggressive suspension and an extensive weight reduction to 1,230 kg (2,712 lb) from the normal NSX weight of 1,350 kg (2,976 lb). The NSX Type R was track oriented and, to reduce weight, lacked sound deadening, audio, electric windows and air conditioning. The NSX Type R's role was fulfilled by the NSX Type S Zero in 1997.

A second iteration of the Type R, dubbed NSX-R, was released in 2002, again exclusively in Japan. The NSX-R had a more aggressive rear spoiler and hood vent, featured a roof scoop, along with various refinements to reduce weight to 1,270 kg (2,800 lb). Under the body, panels and air fences in the front, along with a small rear diffuser, produced balanced downforce. These subtle changes along with its renowned handling kept the NSX-R competitive on the track against considerably higher-powered cars.

== Integra Type R ==
=== DC2 Integra Type R (1995–2001) ===
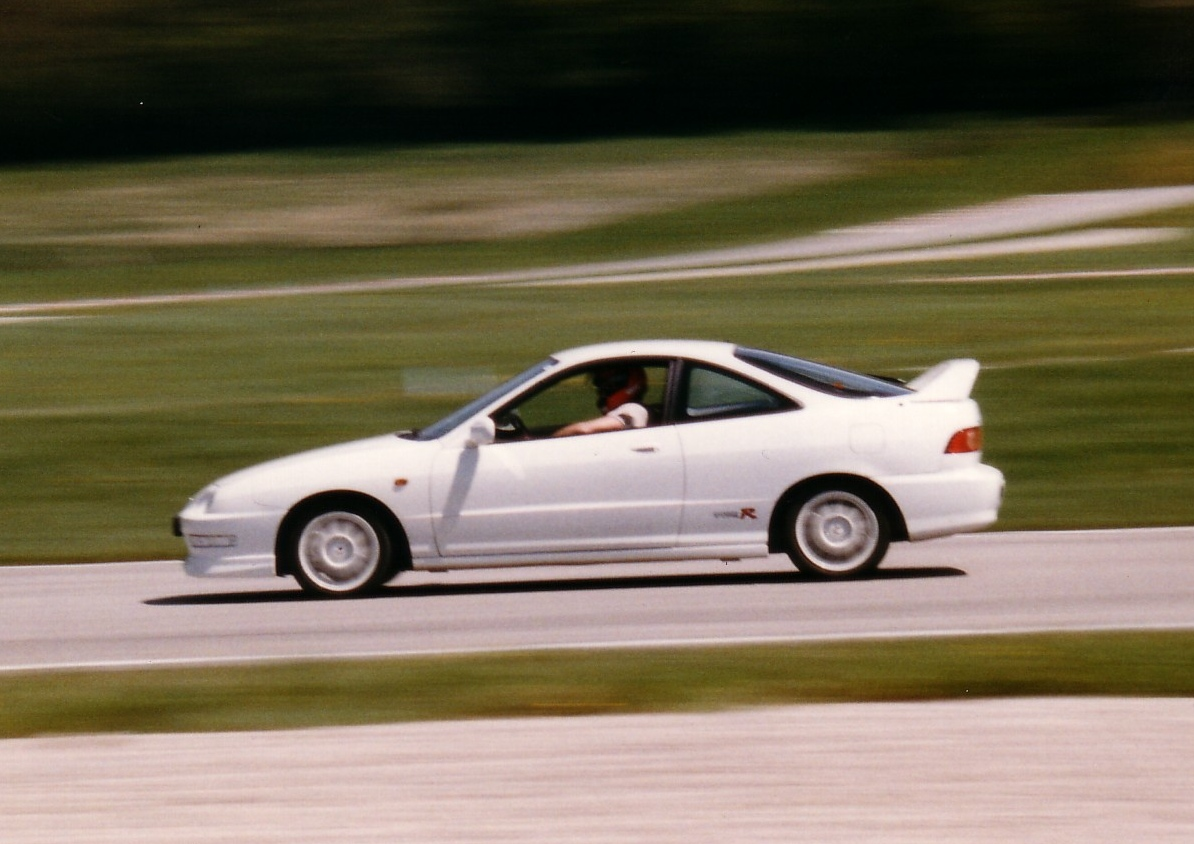
1998 Honda Integra Type R for the European market

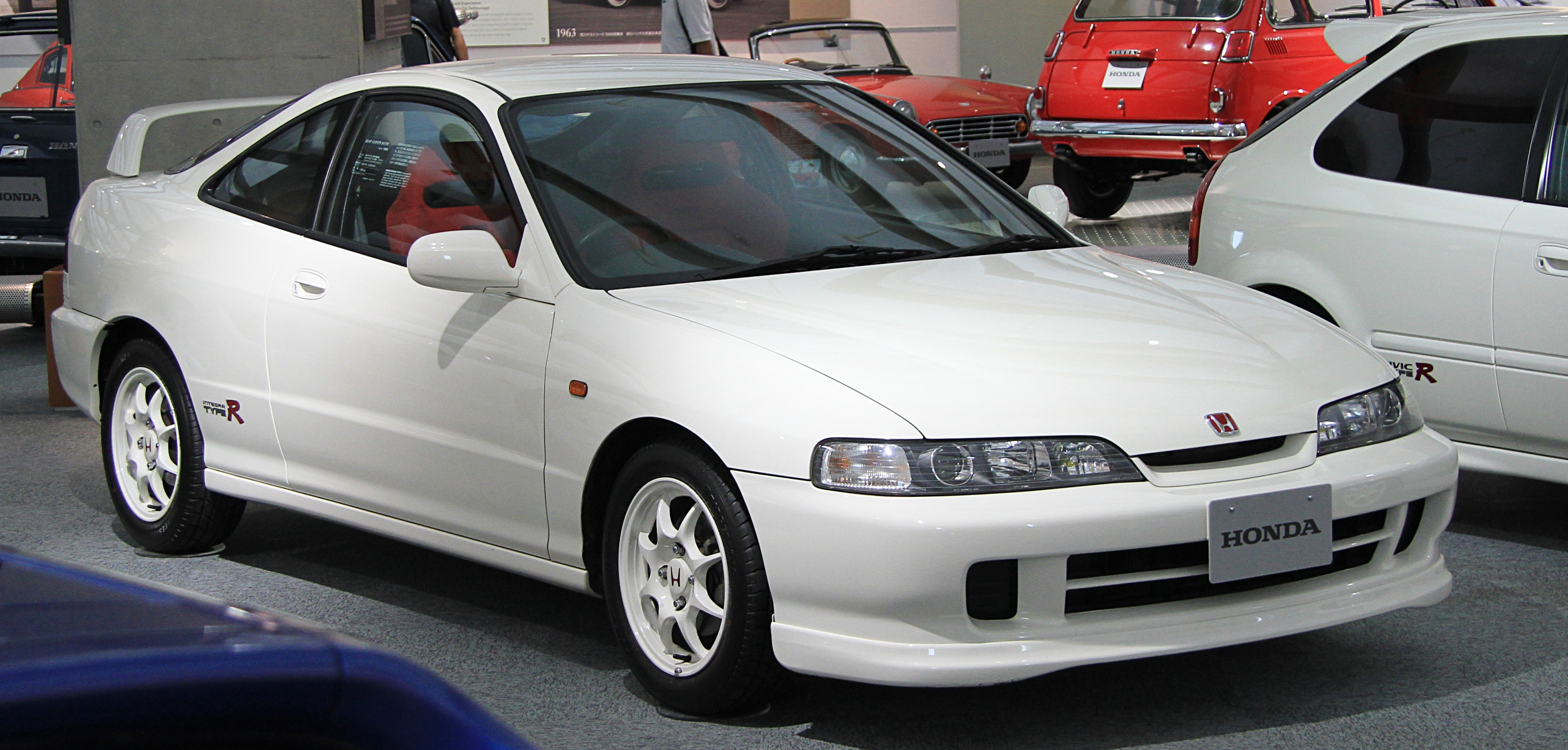
1995-1997 JDM Honda Integra Type R

In 1995, Honda introduced their first Integra Type R to the Japanese Domestic Market (JDM).

The Integra Type R is equipped with a 1.8-liter DOHC VTEC in-line 4-cylinder (B18C) engine. In the JDM Type R this engine produces 200 PS (197 hp; 147 kW) at 8,000 rpm, whereas in the US models it produces 195 hp (198 PS; 145 kW) at 8,000 rpm and 130 lb⋅ft (176 N⋅m) of torque at 5,700 rpm. JDM cars and cars sold in other international markets came with an 11:1 compression ratio whereas the USDM Integra Type R has a compression ratio of 10.6:1. There were numerous differences between the Type R engine and the DOHC VTEC engine available in other Integra models (GS-R) but the increased power was primarily due to the higher compression, larger throttle body, high-lift camshafts and high-volume exhaust manifold.

The Type R came only with a close-ratio 5-speed manual transmission. First gear and the final drive were identical to the GS-R transmission but gears two to four were spaced much closer. In addition, the Type R came equipped with a helical limited-slip differential. In 1998, the JDM Type R and other international markets would receive a revised final drive ratio of 4.785 while the USDM Type R was equipped with a 4.40 final drive ratio.

The focus of the Type R was to minimize weight while enhancing rigidity. The Type R has larger strut tower bars, rear performance rods on the rear frame and numerous body reinforcements. The Type R had revised springs and dampers as well as larger sway bars.

The 1995–1997 Type R has 4-lug 15 x 6-inch aluminum wheels wrapped in Bridgestone Potenza RE010 195/55R15 tires. Larger rotors and calipers were included and the ABS system was revised as well. The 1998 JDM Type R would receive 5-lug 16-inch alloy wheels wrapped in 215/45/ZR16 tires.

Other features such as a moonroof, vanity mirrors, cruise control and a rear wiper were eliminated to save weight. Air conditioning was an option. The interior was revised as well to include a 10,000 rpm tachometer with an 8,400 rpm redline along with revised sport cloth seats and a titanium shift knob.

=== US Integra Type R ===
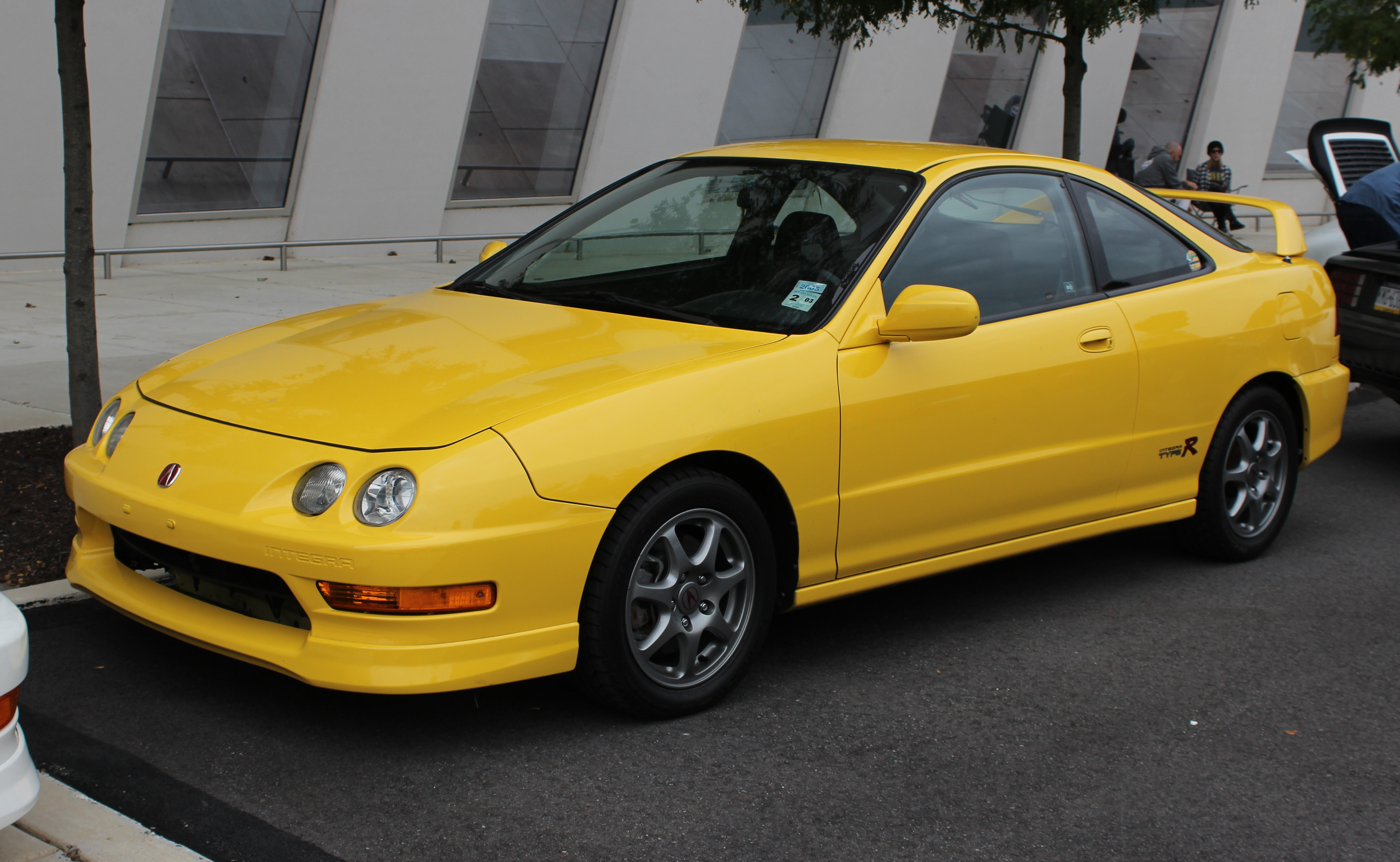
US Acura Integra Type R

The Type R was introduced as a 1997 model to the US market under the Acura brand with the only option being air conditioning. In the US, the car would only be available in Championship White in 1997 and 1998. The Type R was not available for 1999 but returned in 2000 and remained until the end of DC2 production in 2001. Two colors were available for 2000 and 2001: Phoenix Yellow ('00-'01) and Flamenco Black Pearl ('00) or Nighthawk Black Pearl ('01).

The 1997 Integra Type R made 25 hp (19 kW) more than the Integra GS-R and was 93 lb (42 kg) lighter. At the time, the Integra Type R set the record for the most power per liter (108 hp (81 kW) per liter) of a naturally aspirated piston engine ever produced for the US. This record would later be broken by the Honda S2000 which made 120 hp (89 kW) per liter.

Production would be limited to 320 units in 1997 and 1,000 units in 1998, while 1,350 units were built for the US in 2000 and 1,158 in 2001. A total of 3,823 Integra Type R were produced.

=== DC2 Type R weight comparison ===
The below table lists the curb weights of the Integra Type R by model year (lbs).

| Model | 1996 | 1997 | 1998 | 1999 | 2000 | 2001 |
|---|---|---|---|---|---|---|
| JDM Integra Type R | 2,325 | | 2,420 | | | |
| US Integra Type R | N/A | 2,560 | 2,577 | N/A | 2,633 | 2,639 |
| UK Integra Type R | N/A | 2,513 | | | | |
| AU Integra Type R | N/A | N/A | N/A | | 2,397 | |

The below table shows the weight gains/losses due to the differences in parts between the Integra Type R and the Integra VTi-R as listed by Wheels magazine in 1994.

| Part | kg | lbs |
|---|---|---|
| Recaro Seats | 6.65 | 14.65 |
| Stiffer suspension/High-grip tires | 5.50 | 12.13 |
| Performance Rod & Aluminum Make | 3.44 | 7.58 |
| Rear Spoiler | 2.90 | 6.39 |
| Body Stiffening Metal Sheets | 1.71 | 3.77 |
| LSD | 1.50 | 3.31 |
| Miscellaneous | 1.16 | 2.56 |
| Front Spoiler | 1.03 | 2.28 |
| Strengthening Wheel Bolts & Bearings | 0.70 | 1.55 |
| Strengthening Tailgate Area | 0.31 | 0.69 |
| Stiffer Rubber Exhaust Piping Mounts | 0.14 | 0.31 |
| Floor Heat Panel Removed | −0.272 | (0.60) |
| Fuel Tank Wave Absorber Removed | −0.45 | (0.99) |
| MOMO Small-Radius Steering Wheel | −0.7 | (1.54) |
| Lighten Flywheel | −0.75 | (1.65) |
| Resin Spare Tire Lid | −0.997 | (2.20) |
| Aluminum Left-Side "Stopper Bracket" | −1.3 | (2.87) |
| Aluminum Radiator | −1.35 | (2.98) |
| Rear Wiper Removal | −1.851 | (4.08) |
| Compact Battery | −3 | (6.61) |
| Lighter Engine, Exhaust Pipings | −3.329 | (7.34) |
| Dashboard Insulator Removed | −3.869 | (8.53) |
| Lighter Aluminum Wheels | −5.2 | (11.46) |
| Car Stereo & Antenna Removal (optional) | −5.665 | (12.49) |
| Miscellaneous | −6.919 | (15.25) |
| Floor Sheetmetal Removed | −10.665 | (23.51) |
| Air Conditioner Removal (optional) | −18.7 | (41.23) |
| Net Weight Reduction | (39.97) | (88.11) |

Using the actual Wheels test weight of 1176 kg for VTi-R -40 kg listed, AuDM Type R weight reduction yields approximately a 1136 kg (2504 lb) curb weight.

It has been acclaimed by motoring journalists world-wide, including Evo magazine, who named the Type R "the greatest front-wheel-drive performance car ever" and TheAutoChannel.com, who also named it 'the best handling front-wheel drive car ever.'

=== DC5 Integra Type R (2002–2006) ===
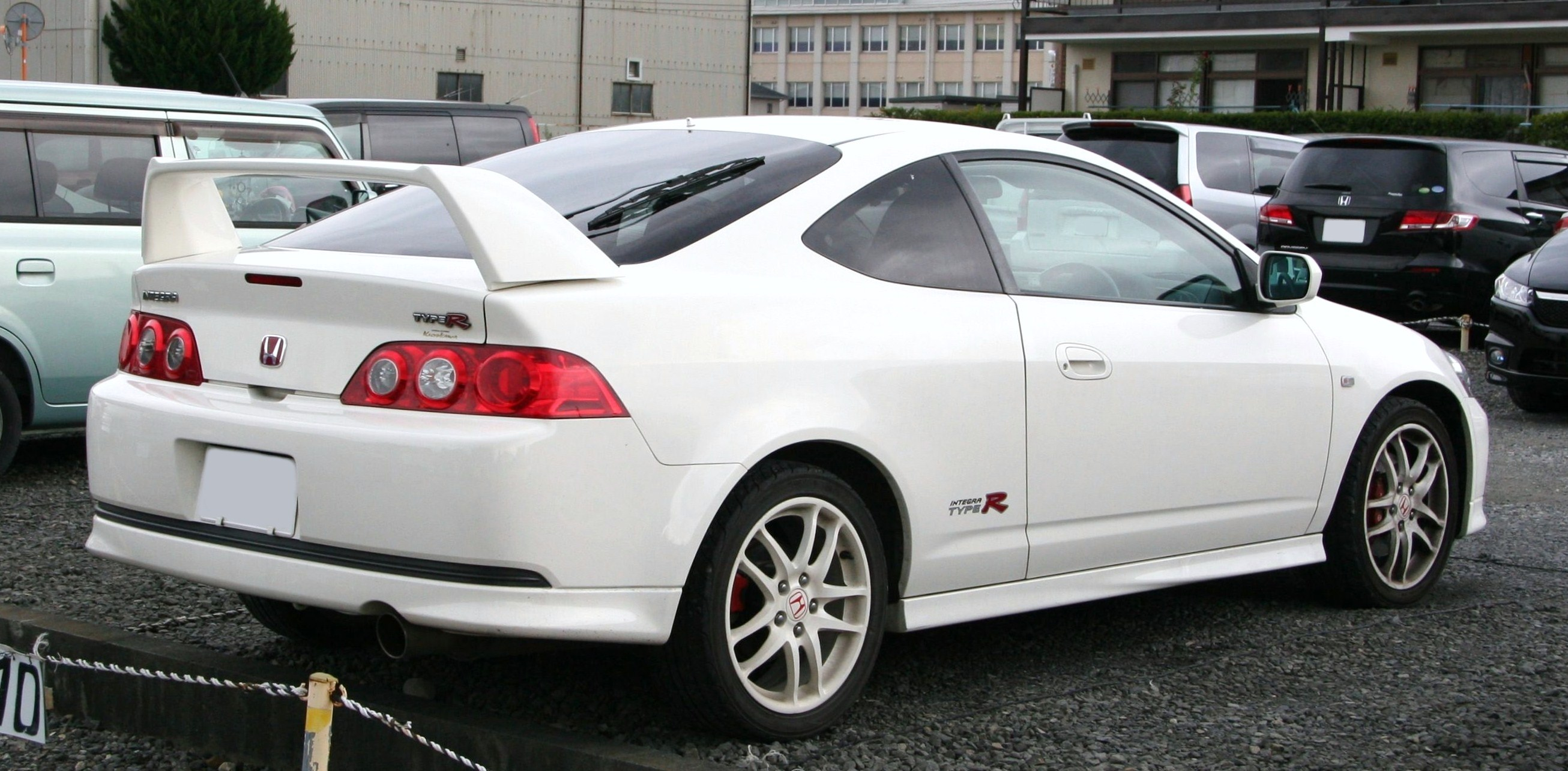
Honda Integra Type R DC5

The DC5 Type R (Japanese market only) comes standard with a K20A 220 hp (164 kW) 2.0-litre DOHC i-VTEC four-cylinder engine. The "i" in i-VTEC stands for intelligent VTEC, which employs VTC (Variable Timing Control) to advance the timing up to 50 degrees. The DC5 comes equipped with Recaro seats, four-piston Brembo front brakes, a close-ratio six-speed manual transmission, a limited-slip differential, and a stiffer suspension.

== Accord Type R and Euro-R ==
The Honda Accord Type R (ATR) was produced from 1998 to 2002 using the CH1 Accord chassis and sold in European markets. The JDM Accord Euro-R uses the CL1 chassis. Both models are powered by a naturally aspirated 2.2-litre four-cylinder DOHC H22A7 "Red Top" VTEC motor which produces 217 bhp (220 PS; 162 kW) in the JDM model and 209 bhp (212 PS; 156 kW) at 7,200 rpm and 164 lb⋅ft (222 N⋅m) of torque at 6,700 rpm in the EDM model. The Type R Accord model is differentiated by features such as a stiffer suspension and chassis, helical limited-slip differential, twin-piston brakes, dual exhaust system, 17-inch alloy wheels, Xenon headlights, Recaro seats and a leather-trimmed Momo steering wheel. A Torneo Euro R was produced in 2002, being mechanically identical to the CL1, with different front and rear styling.

The successor to the CL1 Accord Euro-R is the CL7 Accord Euro-R, produced from December 2002 to 2008 and built in Sayama, Japan for the JDM market. It is powered by a 2.0 L (1,998 cc) K20AI-VTEC motor with 220 PS (217 bhp; 162 kW) at 8,000 rpm and 206 N⋅m (152 lbf⋅ft) of torque at 7,000 rpm. The engine run on 11.5:1 compression and has a redline of 8,300 rpm. It also has the standard Type R features, including Recaro seats, a limited-slip differential and independent double-wishbone suspension.

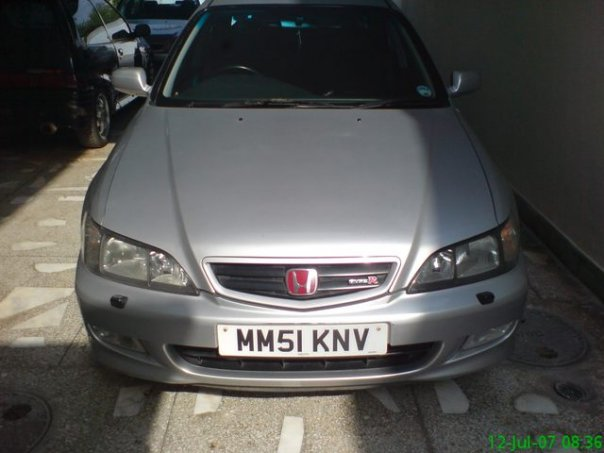
European 'CH1' face-lifted 2002 Accord Type-R

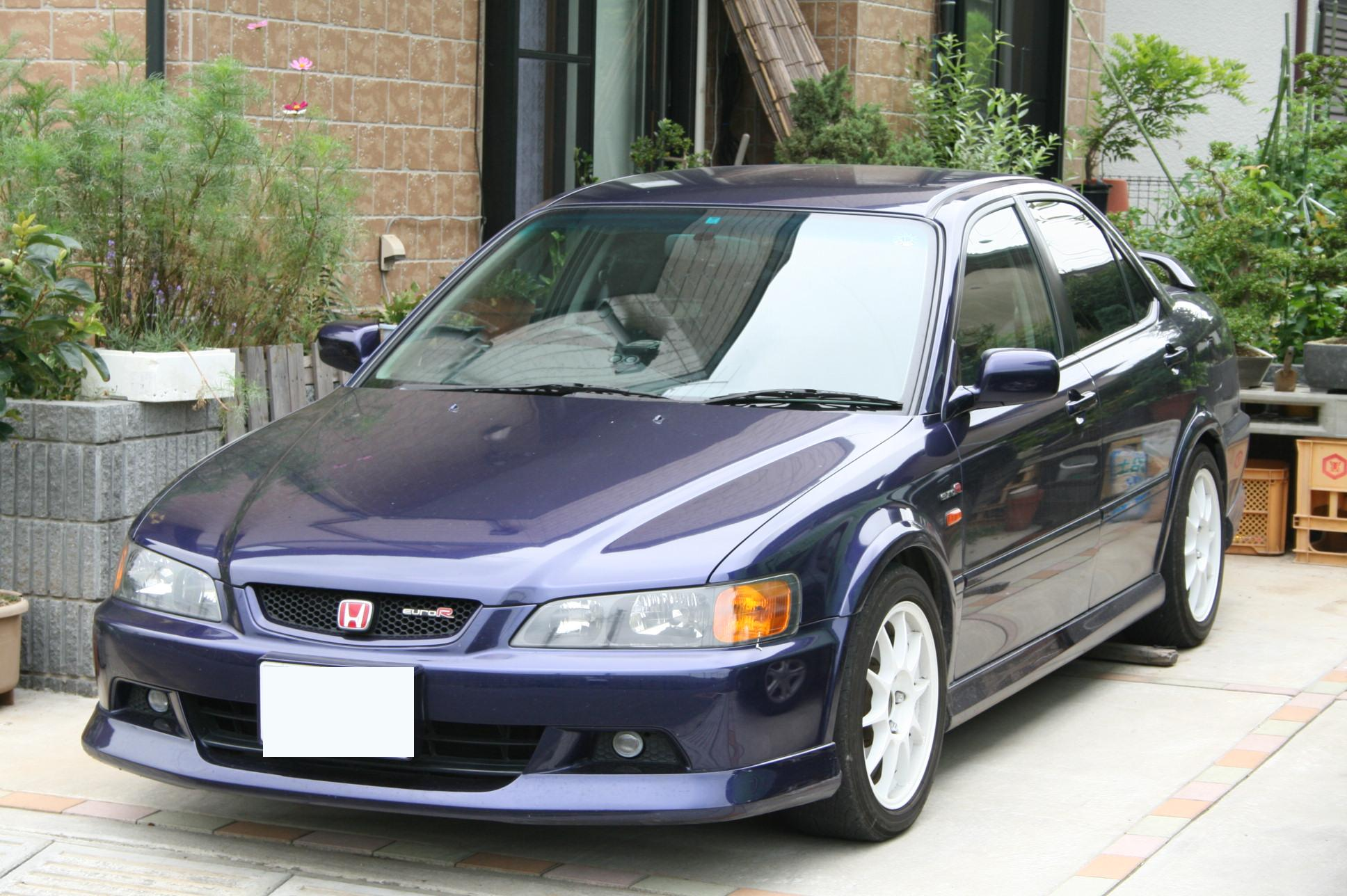
JDM 'CL1' Accord Euro-R

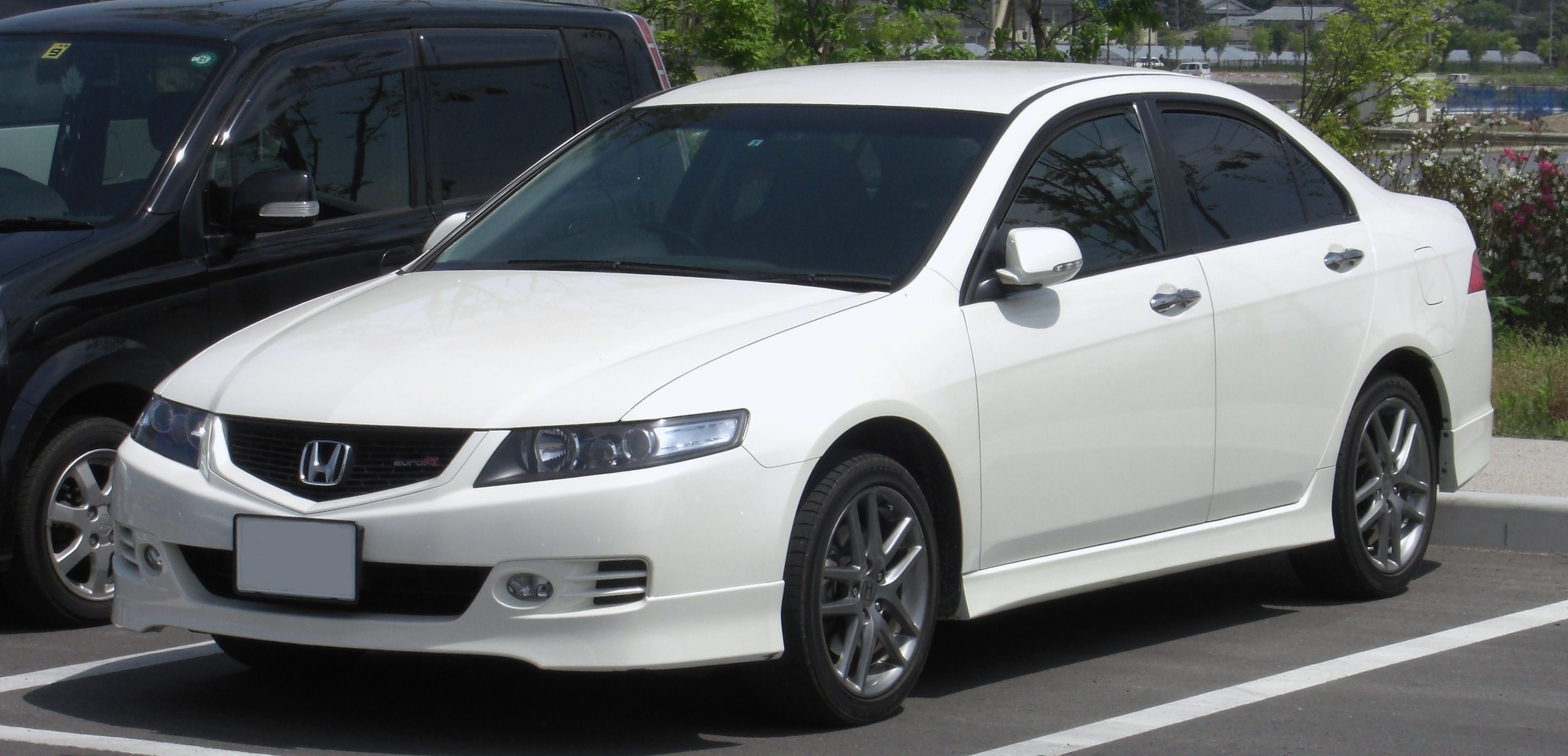
Honda Accord Euro R sedan (Japan)

== Civic Type R ==
The 1997 EK9 Civic was third to be given the Type R badge. Based on the EK4 SiR chassis, it features a Type R prepared B16B engine producing 185 PS (182 bhp; 136 kW) along with a stiffer chassis, upgraded sway bars and strut bars, Recaro seats trimmed in Alcantara, 15-inch alloy wheels and a large boot spoiler. Since then, most generations have offered a Type R variant. The first-generation Civic Type R was the only version not offered outside Japan.

July 2015 saw the launch of a new Honda Civic Type R, manufactured at their Swindon plant. The vehicle offers higher performance in the form of a direct-injected turbocharged 2.0 liter VTEC K20C1 petrol engine producing 306 bhp (310 PS; 228 kW), and built in the United States at Honda's Anna Engine Plant in Anna, Ohio. Redesigned in 2017 but using the same engine, the fifth-generation Civic Type R accelerates from 0-62 mph (100 km/h) in 5.7 seconds and has a top speed of 169 mph (272 km/h).

In May 2018, engineers at Honda's Swindon, UK factory developed a one off Civic Type R, the car called project P is a pickup truck, the performance and drivetrain are the same as the production Type R.

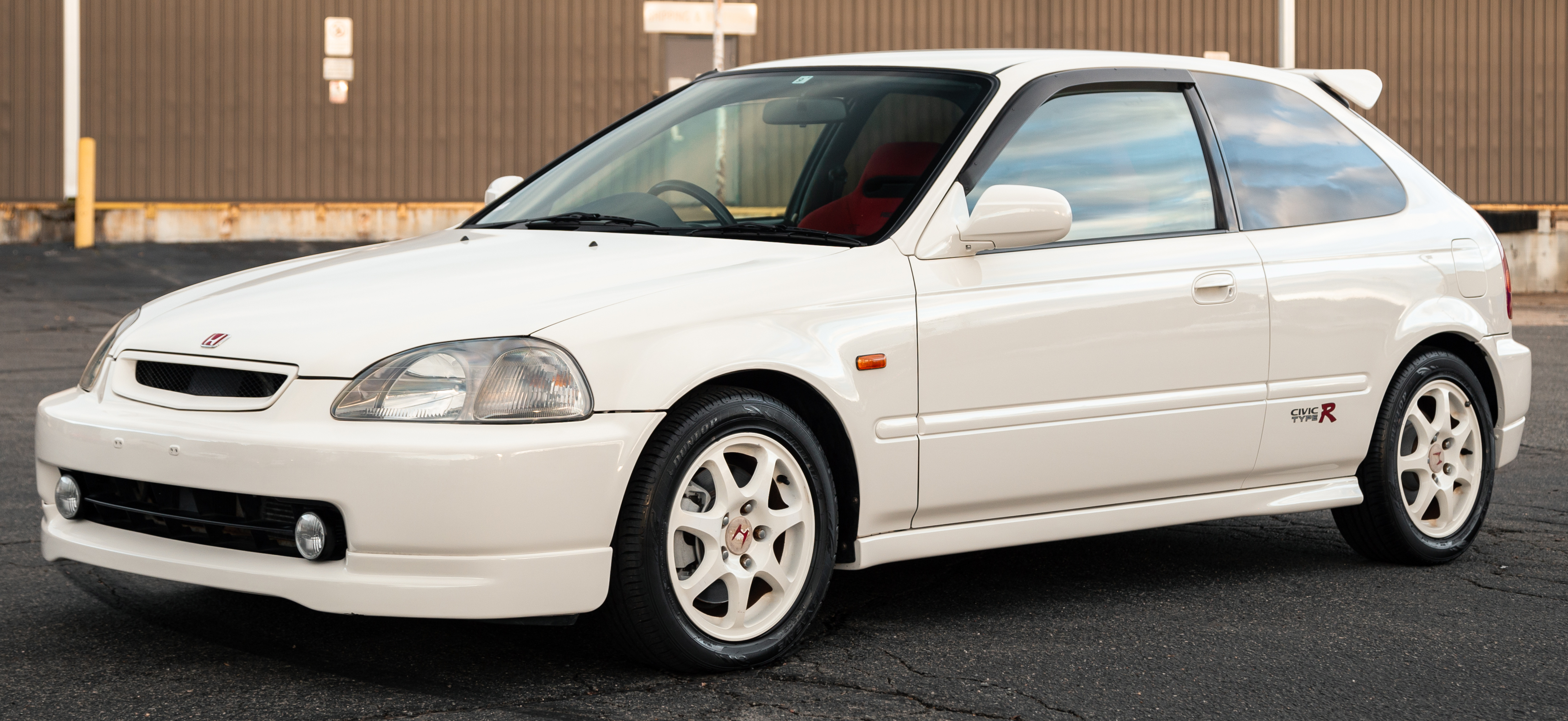
1997 Honda Civic Type R (EK9)

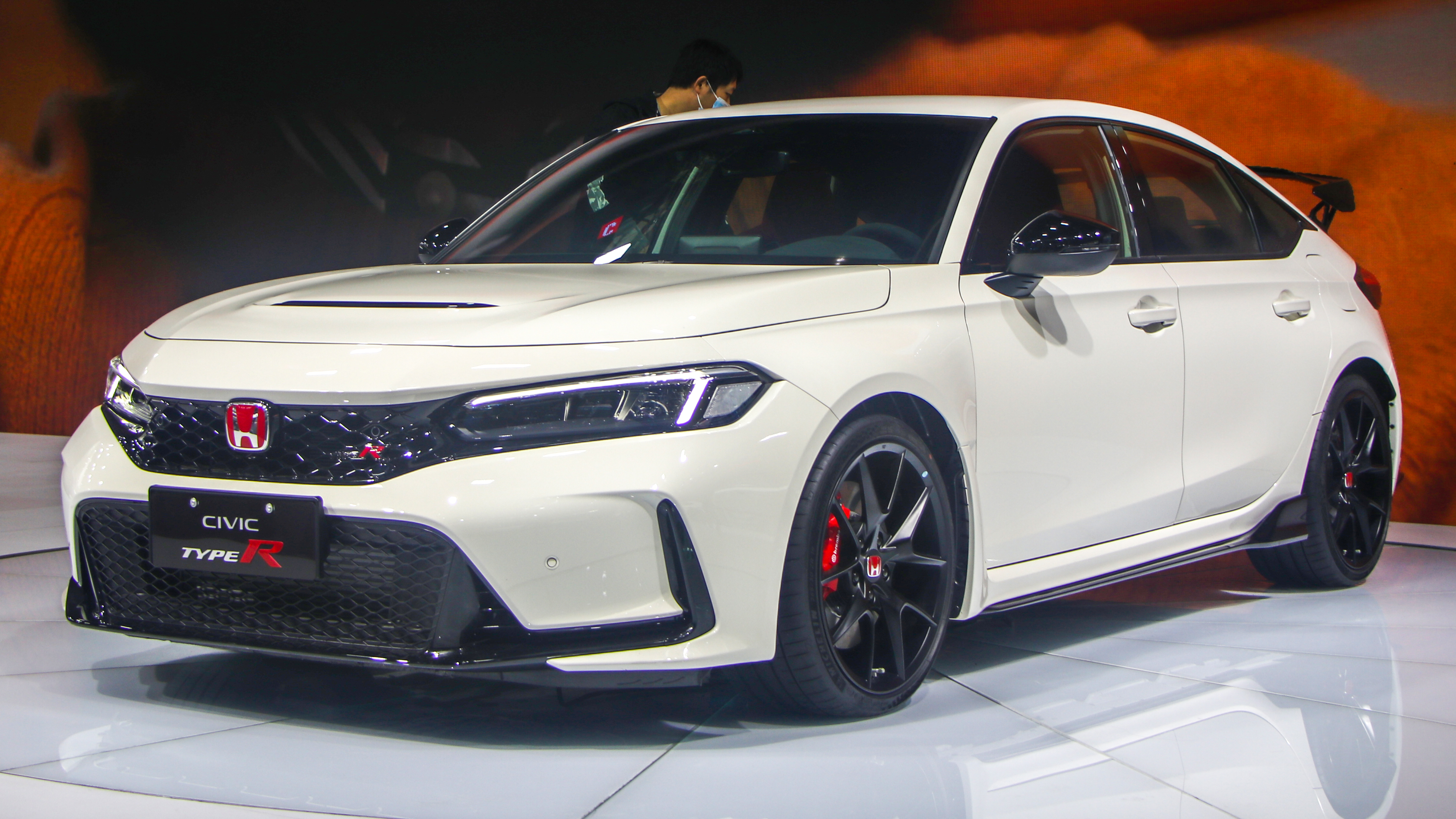
2022 Honda Civic Type R (FL5)

== See also ==
- Honda in motorsport
- Honda in Formula One
