= Liverpool Culture Company =

Local council body promoting cultural events in England

The Liverpool Culture Company is an organisation that is responsible for the development of cultural programmes in the city of Liverpool, England. Set up by Liverpool City Council in 2004 after the city was announced as the European Capital of Culture in 2008, the Liverpool Culture Company was given the remit to 'deliver the culture programme up to and beyond 2008'.
