= Swing-piston engine =

Engine configuration

A swing-piston engine is a type of internal combustion engine in which the pistons move in a circular motion inside a ring-shaped "cylinder", moving closer and further from each other to provide compression and expansion. Generally two sets of pistons are used, geared to move in a fixed relationship as they rotate around the cylinder. In some versions the pistons oscillate around a fixed center, as opposed to rotating around the entire engine. The design has also been referred to as an oscillating piston engine, vibratory engine when the pistons oscillate instead of rotate, or toroidal engine based on the shape of the "cylinder".

Many swing-piston engines have been proposed, but none have been successful. Two attempts in about 2010 are the prototype American-made MYT engine and prototype Russian ORE for use in the Yo-Mobile hybrid car. Both claimed high fuel efficiency and high power-to-weight ratio, but there have been no successful demonstrations of claimed efficiency or that the engines are durable enough for practical use.

== Steam engines ==
Swing-piston engines were initially introduced during the 1820s as alternate steam engine designs, prior to the widespread introduction of the steam turbine. In these examples the "piston" is typically not cylindrical as in a modern internal combustion design, and is generally rectangular in cross-section as seen from the top, rotating in a flat disk "cylinder". From the side they are either flat plates or pie-wedge shaped. The term "swing-piston" is not entirely accurate in these cases, but the operating cycle is identical and is properly considered here.

The first known example was introduced by Elijah Galloway in 1829 for ship propulsion. It featured a single vane rotating through 270 degrees. It appears this version was never built, although a model still exists in the Science Museum. Galloway also designed a wide variety of pure rotary engines using vanes as well.

A more serious attempt was the "Cambrian System" of John Jones in 1841. This design used two or three flat plates that were geared to move closer or further apart as the cycle continued. When the plates were at their closest point, steam was admitted between them using a valve, pushing them apart as the cycle continued. When the plates reached their maximum distance, an internal passage was uncovered that allowed the partially expanded steam to flow across the center of the device into the area on the other side of the vanes, which were now at their minimum distance. In this fashion the design was effectively a compound engine.

Many variations followed, and a number of these saw limited use in the field. Notable among them was John Ericsson's design of 1843, which powered the USS Princeton, the United States' first screw-powered steamship. Charles Parsons examined the concept and appears to have produced two swing-piston engine designs before moving on to the steam turbine. The Roots brothers designed a swing-piston engine of a unique type, although they are better known for their supercharger design.

== Internal combustion ==
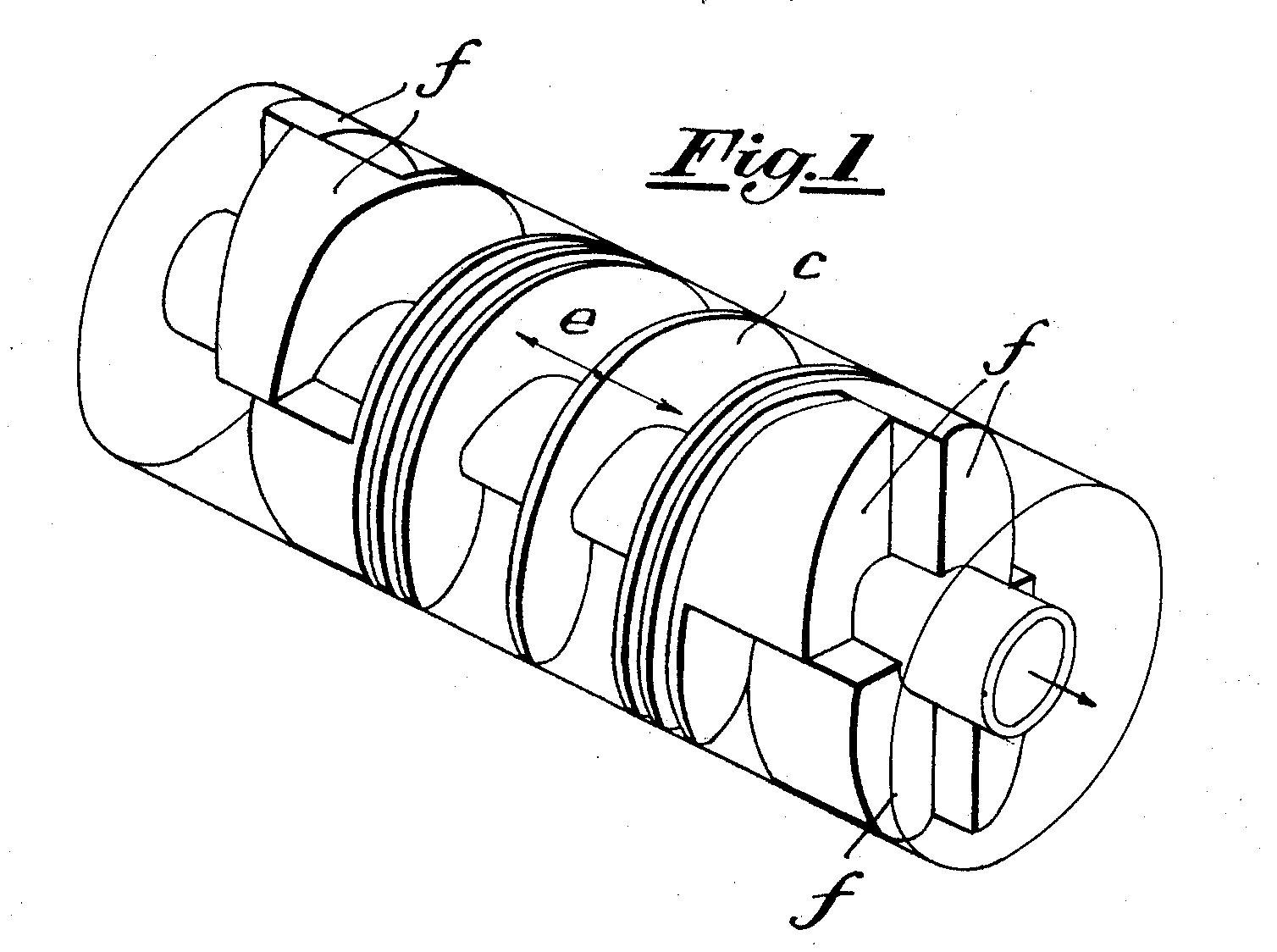
Figure 1 of U.S. patent 2,301,667 showing a shaft, helical pistons and cams of Otto Lutz's engine

It is unclear whether or not any internal combustion swing-piston engine has ever reached production, but the closest attempt appears to be the German World War II-era design by Otto Lutz. His design had six pistons in total, three each attached to two disks. The disks were geared to each other to form six chambers between the pistons, such that at any one time one set of three chambers were "close together" while the other set of three was "wide apart", varying between those two extremes as the disks rotated. The timing was arranged such that the chambers reached their "close together" point over the spark plug, and their "wide apart" point over the intake and exhaust ports. This action is similar to the Wankel engine, the primary difference being that the Wankel creates compression and expansion via the shape of the engine and rotor, rather than the relative motion of the pistons.

Lutz's engine was being designed as an experimental gas generator for a new type of aircraft engine, one that replaced a traditional centrifugal or axial compressor with his swing-piston design. Ultimately the exhaust would be used to drive a turbine, that power being used to drive a propeller to produce a turboprop. For this role the exhaust gas was too hot to be used directly in a turbine, given the materials available at the time, so the engine had a second "exhaust port" that vented cold pressurized air, which was then mixed into the hot exhaust. For direct power use, as opposed to driving a turbine, this "third area" of the engine could simply be left open to the air to avoid losing power by unnecessary compression.

The initial test engines had some minor problems, notably with sealing, but these were worked through and the engines were under test during 1944. One particularly good feature of swing-piston engines is that they can be bolted back to back along a common crank shaft to make a larger engine, and with each additional stage the running becomes smoother and the only part that needs to be made larger is the crankshaft. A similar arrangement with a radial engine is generally more difficult to arrange, especially cooling, and ones with inline engine arrangements soon become so long that keeping the crankshaft from vibrating becomes a serious problem (see Chrysler IV-2220 for example).

Each "cylinder" from Lutz's design was 0.70 m in diameter and only about 30 cm in depth, providing 445 hp from 140 kg, an excellent power-to-weight ratio compared even to jet engines of the era. A five-block version was proposed for his turboprop concept, providing 3,450 hp from an engine about 2 m long. While the power-to-weight ratio was good, the density of the engine was simply superb.

The overall turboprop looked much more like a jet engine than a piston one. The swing-piston gas generator was located in the middle of a long nacelle, with a five-stage axial compressor in front and a three-stage turbine behind. The compressor was used both to act as a supercharger for the piston engine, as well as provide cold air to cool the turbine. The actual power to the propeller, combining both the pistons and the turbines, was 4,930 hp at 10,000 m altitude, far greater than any German wartime project.

Why all this complexity to produce a new version of an engine, the turboprop, whose primary advantage was simplicity? The main problem with conventional jet engines is that the combustion takes place in an open chamber, which is considerably less efficient than the closed chamber of a piston engine, where it has constant volume (or close to it). The Otto cycle or Diesel cycle used in piston engines has a much lower specific fuel consumption than the Brayton cycle of traditional gas turbine engines at low speed. Lutz's design was intended to power very long-range bombers and patrol aircraft, where fuel economy was more important than simplicity and performance.

Lutz later patented the design under "Rotary compressor and other engines", U.S. patent 2,301,667.

== Other examples ==
Lutz's design is not the only way to produce such an engine: BMW experimented with a traditional engine with poppet valves on the combustion chambers, which had been used a number of times previously in experiments. Another approach entirely is to recover some of the heat of the exhaust in a heat exchanger and use that instead of fuel to heat the compressed air, a concept used by General Motors in a series of automobile turbines. Generally, however, improvements in the basic piston engine in "low-power" roles have kept any of these advanced designs out of the marketplace.

In the 1990s, a number of inventors re-introduced the concept as if it were new. Examples include Angel Labs' "Massive Yet Tiny" engine, the Rotoblock, the Roundengine, the Trochilic Engine, and designs by Tschudi and Hoose. In 2009, Russian billionaire industrialist Mikhail Prokhorov announced his plans to enter an automotive business with a series of a lightweight hybrid vehicles using this design as their prime mover. Another recent introduction aimed at the hybrid market is the "Hüttlin Kugelmotor", which combines the swing-piston concept with a modified swashplate to produce a spherical design that directly powers an internal electrical generator. The Taurozzi pendulum engine (U.S. patent 6,382,143) has cylinders that follow the shape of a toroid, but is otherwise similar to a conventional reciprocating engine.

== Other names ==
The Tschudi engine is also known as a "cat-and-mouse engine" or a "scissor engine".

== See also ==
- Free-piston engine
- Opposed piston engine
- Oscillating cylinder steam engine
