= Torus (housing association) =

Housing association

Torus (officially Torus62 Ltd, a Community Benefit Society no 7973) is a housing association in North West England.

Torus is the parent organisation of Liverpool Mutual Homes, Helena Partnerships (in St Helens) and Golden Gates Housing Trust (in Warrington).

== Liverpool ==
Liverpool Mutual Homes is a tenant-led housing association in Merseyside The housing association manages more than 15,000 homes across the county, all of which were either previously owned by Liverpool City Council or are new developments. The main offices of the organisation are based on Old Haymarket, Liverpool.

== St Helens ==
Helena Housing Ltd formed in 2001 to manage housing owned by St Helens Metropolitan Borough Council.

== Warrington ==
Golden Gates was owned by Warrington Borough Council. It became a Trust in 2010 and joined Torus in 2015.
