= Timeline of Liverpool =

Coordinates: 53.4°N 3°W

The following is a timeline of the history of the city of Liverpool, England.

== Prior to 18th century ==
Year	Date	Event
4000 BCE		The Calderstones are erected.
902		Vikings and Irish people who left Ireland and were permitted by Anglo-Saxon rulers to settle in Wirral and would make the first known settlement near what would later become Liverpool.
1089		The West Derby Hundred is recorded in the Domesday Book.
1150		Birkenhead Priory, the oldest surviving building on Merseyside and credited with establishing the Mersey Ferry.
1207	28 August	Liverpool and its market is chartered by King John.
1229		Charter granted by Henry III authorizing a merchants' guild.
1237		Liverpool Castle was built.
1266		Liverpool passed into the hands of Edmund Crouchback, Earl of Lancaster.
1292		John De More becomes Lord Mayor of Liverpool.
1295		Borough sends two members to the first royal parliament.
1349		The Black Death plague hits Liverpool, killing 240 of its population of 1,000 people.
1361		England first used Liverpool to launch a major military intervention into Ireland, led by Lionel of Antwerp, Duke of Clarence ( the third son of king Edward III, this marked the first time the English crown staged a massive state-funded royal expedition out of Liverpool, Edward III ordered “ the whole navey of the land” to gather at the port of Liverpool the intervention led to the Statutes of Kilkenny.
1385		The Stanley family acquired the Knowsley estate.
1495		Knowsley Hall built as a residence by Thomas Stanley, 1st Earl of Derby
1565		The first official list of Liverpool ships recorded 12 vessels, the largest being the 40-ton barque Eagle.
1575		Croxteth Hall built as residence for the Earl of Sefton.
1577		The earliest documented Horse racing in Liverpool area took place intermittently on the sands of Crosby Beach for about 200 years, with the final meeting at the site occurring in 1786.
1588		Humfraye Brooke, a prominent Liverpool shipowner, merchant and sea captain, who is best remembered for providing England with its crucial first warning of the Spanish Armada while outward bound on a trading voyage from Liverpool to the Canary Islands Brooke spotted the Biscayan division of the advancing Spanish fleet sailing north, recognising the imminent danger he sailed at maximum speed to Plymouth, he successfully delivered the first intelligence to Englands military commanders - including Sir Francis Drake allowing the English fleet time to prepare.
1598		Speke Hall (house) built.
1615		Tue Brook House built.
1639		Astronomer Jeremiah Horrocks is one of the first to observe a Transit of Venus.
1640		Population is 1000.
1643		Parliamentarian forces ( Roundhead) captured Liverpool from the Royalist (Cavalier) turning it into a key military stronghold, in the English Civil War.
1644	June	The Kings nephew Prince Rupert of the Rhine led a brutal siege against Liverpool it took his forces days of bloody fighting to capture Liverpool Castle.
1647		Liverpool was officially declared a free and independent port, free from the restrictions imposed by Chester, as the river Dee began to silt up, Chester's fortunes declined as Liverpool began to prosper, Liverpool had taken over Chester as the main port to trade with Ireland, this was short-lived after the Irish Rebellion of 1641.
1674		Town Hall rebuilt.
1648		The first cargo from Virginia of America to Liverpool arrives aboard the Friendship, a vessel of 30 tons under the command of Captain James Jenkinson. The trade focused on exchanging goods like cloth, coal and salt from Lancashire and Cheshire regions for American products such as sugar and tobacco.
1660		The Restoration of the English monarchy of Charles II of England in 1660 marks the start of Liverpools rapid rise as a port and ship owning centre.
1666		The Antelope ship, pioneer of Liverpools global Transatlantic West Indies merchant trade, carrying local goods and returning with Sugarcane from Barbados.
1681		William Penn fleet of 25 ships left England, Belgic ship for Delaware with colonist bound for Pennsylvania. Six of the fleet were Liverpool ship’s Freeman,Lyon, Friendship, Friends Adventure, Lamb, Antelope, Pen himself sailed on the last one The Submission.. leaving Liverpool in 1682.
1684		Richard Atherton becomes Lord Mayor of Liverpool and secures the surrender of the Liverpool Charter, which was delivered to George Jeffreys, 1st Baron Jeffreys, known as Judge Jeffreys, at Bewsey Old Hall in 1684. The notes on the Liverpool Charters refer to Atherton as the first modern Mayor of Liverpool.
1685		King's Regiment (Liverpool) founded, one of the oldest line infantry regiments of the British Army.
1690	June 11	William III of England departed for Ireland from Hoylake Merseyside, William gathered a massive armarda of roughly 300 ships and thousands of troops along the Wirral Peninsula, this critical journey directly set the stage for this decisive clash against the deposed Catholic James II of England at the Battle of the Boyne.
1699	1 December	The Liverpool Merchant sails from Liverpool, marking the beginning of the Liverpool slave trade.

== 18th century ==
Year	Date	Event
1700		The slave ship Blessing begins operating.
1700		Population is 5,714.
1702		Croxteth Hall (house) built.
1704		Woolton Hall (house) built.
1708		Blue Coat School founded.
1715		Opening of the world's first enclosed commercial wet dock; the Old Dock.
1717		Bluecoat Chambers built.
1718		Blue Coat hospital opens.
1720		Population is 10,446.
1722		Ranelagh Gardens opens.
1724	25 August	Animal painter George Stubbs is born.
1726		Liverpool Castle demolished.
1726		"Ye Hole in Ye Wall" pub on Hackins Hey opens.
1726		John Okill shipbuilder, on Nova Scotia Docks.
1730		Black people in Liverpool is the oldest and longest established black community in UK and Europe.
1734		Financier Robert Morris is born on Dale Street.
1736		Allerton Hall built.
1737		Canning Dock built.
1739		The most intense period of Liverpool state-sanctioned Piracy known as Privateering took place between 1739-1815, during wartime Liverpool merchants heavily outfitted privateers to plunder enemy ships transforming the city into the Privateering capital of Great Britain.
1740		Jewish community established, being the first in Northern England. Stanley Street becomes the location for Liverpool's first Synagogue in 1751.
1741		HMS Liverpool, a 681-ton, 44-gun, fifth-rate frigate, is launched by shipbuilder John Okill, the first Royal Navy ship named after the city.
1742		Rathbones in business.
1743	22 June	King's Regiment (Liverpool) goes into battle in the Battle of Dettingen during the War of the Austrian Succession.
1744	March	France declared war on Britain Liverpool merchants armed and outfitted four privateers to raid enemy shipping. Old Noll : 22 guns 180 men was 250-ton heck boat. Terrible: 22 guns 180 men Thurloe: 12 gun 100 men Admiral Blake
1745		Williamson Square laid out
1745	11 May	King's Regiment (Liverpool) goes into battle in the Battle of Fontenoy during the War of the Austrian Succession, the regiment participation in the era is commentated on the Monument to the King's Liverpool Regiment.
1748		John Newton's workplace and later home for sixteen years from 1748 to 1764. He later wrote "Amazing Grace".
1749		Royal Infirmary opens.
1752		Richard Chaffers starts a Liverpool porcelain business.
1753		Salthouse Dock built.
1754		Liverpool Town Hall built.
1756-1763		Seven Years' War, over 306 privateers Letter of marque were taken out by Liverpool merchants to plunder French and Spanish ships during the conflict.
1756		Williamson's Liverpool Advertiser begins publication.
1757		Sankey Canal opens and Henry Berry is appointed engineer.
1757	10 June	The privateer Liverpool is launched.
1758		Fawcett, Preston and company, the engineering company established by George Perry with William Fawcett joining the company in 1784.
1758		Circulating library established.
1758	10 February	HMS Liverpool, 28-gun Coventry-class frigate built by Liverpool shipbuilders John Gorill and William Pownall.
1758	11 March	HMS Venus, 32-gun Venus-class frigate built by Liverpool shipbuilders John Okill
1759		First recorded cotton dealing in Liverpool, 28 bags of Jamaican cotton.
1760		Casartelli Building built.
1761		H & C Grayson Ltd shipbuilding established in 1760, Peter Baker established shipbuilding company Baker & Co. near Salthouse Dock.
1763		Octagon Chapel, Liverpool built.
1763		Leasowe Lighthouse built, located on the Wirral Peninsula in Merseyside, is widely recognised as the world's oldest brick-built lighthouse, it was commissioned by the Mersey Docks and Harbour Company to guide ships safely into the Port of Liverpool, William Hutchinson installed what may have been the first Parabolic reflector in a Lighthouse.
1764		Liverpool Dock Master William Hutchinson recorded the world's first extended tide measurements.
1766		City directory published.
1768		Politician and writer Thomas Creevey is born.
1770		Richard and George Holden to derive the first reliable publicist accessibility tide tables
1771		Bidston lighthouse built.
1771		George's Dock opens.
1772		Scotland Road laid out.
1773		Shipowner merchant brought commercialisation and mass production of Marsala wine to the British Empire.
1773		Duke's Dock built.
1773		Peter Baker & Co. Shipbuilding Company built the Kent, a 1,100-ton ship, which was the largest ever constructed in Liverpool at that time.
1775		Banastre Tarleton leads the British Legion in the American War of Independence, during the war Liverpool engaged as the premier prize-taking port on the British mainland, local merchants secured an estimated 1384 Letter of marque to target American, French and Spanish shipping.
1776		Robert Morris, a Liverpool native, one of the principal financiers of the American Revolution and one of the Founding Fathers of the United States.
1776–1777		William Hutchinson established the world's first recorded lifeboat station on Formby beach.
1777	8 May	HMS Harpy launched by John Fisher shipyards.
1778		120 privateers were fitted out in Liverpool, carrying 1,986 guns and 8,745 men.
1778		Joseph Heap & Sons established, operating the Diamond H Shipping Line. The firm used its own fleet to import rice from India and Burma.
1778	22 March	HMS Hyaena 24-Gun Porcupine-class post ship built by Liverpool John Fisher shipyards
1778	25 June	HMS Penelope 24-Gun Sixth-rate Sloop Porcupine-class post ship built by Peter Baker, She was captured by her Spanish prisoners in 1780 during the Anglo-Spanish War.
1778	28 October	During the Anglo-French War the privateer Mentor, owned by Peter Baker, captured the French East Indiaman Carnatic.
1779		Carnatic Hall built.
1779		The Liverpool Medical Library founded, one of the oldest in the world and served as the foundation for what is now the Liverpool Medical Institution.
1779-1780		12th Earl of Derby, who lived in Knowsley Hall just outside Liverpool, was pivotal figure in Horse racing history starting the Epsom Oaks in 1779 and Epsom Derby in 1780.
1780	23 January	HMS Nemesis, 28-gun Enterprise-class frigate of the Royal Navy built and launched by Liverpool shipyards John Smallshaw & Co after Jolly, Leathers and Barton.
1780	24 January	HMS Adamant launched by Peter Baker shipbuilding, she served during the American War of Independence, the French Revolutionary Wars and the Napoleonic Wars in a career that spanned thirty years.
1780	20 May	HMS Daedalus 32-gun Fifth-rate Frigate built by John Fisher shipbuilding of Liverpool.
1781	12 March 10 April	HMS Assistance 50-gun Portland-class Fourth-rate Frigate built by Peter Baker shipbuilding. HMS Success built for the Royal Navy.
1782		HMS Grampus launched by John Fisher shipyards for the Royal Navy was the first in class of two 50-gun Fourth-rate was one the first to be launched with a Copper sheathing to improve speed and protect against marine growth, John Fisher built 7 ships for the Royal Navy
	June 12	HMS Phaeton, 38-gun Minerva-class frigate launched by Liverpool shipbuilders John Smallshaw.
1784	1783	Liverpool population: 62,215
1784		The first Cargo of American Cotton was unloaded in Liverpool, this initial shipment consisted of only eight bags of cotton.
	April 21	HMS Andromeda launched by John Sutton & Co
1785		Liverpool Georgian Quarter constructed.
1785		King's Dock and Queen's Dock built.
1786		Earl of Wycombe (1786 EIC ship) built by Liverpool shipyards Smallshaw & Rodgers
1787		Greenbank House built. Shipowners Rathbone family lived here.
1787		Everton Lock-Up built.
1788		St. Peter's Roman Catholic Church built.
1790		James Maury, appointed the U.S. Consul serving the role for 40 years, in the first consulate established by the United States.
1790		Lime Street laid out.
1791		School for the Blind founded.
1792		Holy Trinity Church, Wavertree, consecrated.
1793		The privateer Pelican sinks with 102 lives lost at sea.
1793-1815		French Revolutionary and Napoleonic Wars Liverpool merchant privateers get over 100s Letter of marque
1794		Benson (1794 ship)
1795		William Bullock founds the Bullocks Museum of Natural Curiosities.
1796		Wavertree Lock-up built.
1797		Liverpool Athenaeum founded.
1797	March 23	Coat of arms of Liverpool granted.
1799	29 March	Edward Smith-Stanley, 14th Earl of Derby was born, three-time Prime Minister of the United Kingdom and the longest serving party leader.

== 19th century ==
=== 1800s–1840s ===
Year	Date	Event
1801		Population is 77,653.
1802		The Lyceum is built, housing England's first subscription library.
1803		Botanical Gardens open.
1805		Extension to Liverpool Town Hall completed providing the main ballroom and council chamber.
1805	October 21	Battle of Trafalgar the maritime workforce of Liverpool played a indispensable role, Liverpool was a massive hotbed for seasoned, battle-ready sailors making it a prime target for Press ganged and naval recruitment 225 came directly from Liverpool.
1807		185 Liverpool ships were engaged in the slave trade, carrying 49,213 slaves in 1807.
1807		Liverpool Cricket Club formed.
1807		Bibby Line shipping company in business.
1807	March	Slave Trade Act in the United Kingdom and Act Prohibiting Importation of Slaves in the United States outlaw the Atlantic slave trade.
1807	27 July	Kitty's Amelia sails on the last legal British slaving voyage.
1808		Exchange Building completed.
1808	August	Corn Exchange built.
1809	25 October	The world's oldest animal charity branch was established at a meeting held in Bold Street, Liverpool in a coffee house, originally named the Society for the Suppression of Wanton Cruelty of Brute Animals, it was founded 15 years before the national RSPCA (originally SPCA) was established in 1824.
1809	29 December	William Ewart Gladstone, Prime Minister of the United Kingdom, was born.
1810		Sir William Brown established Brown Shipley, as the eldest son of Alexander Brown who founded Alex. Brown & Sons the oldest investment banking firm in the US.
1810		The spire of Church of Our Lady and St Nicholas, Liverpool collapsed during morning service killing 21 children from a local orphanage.
1810		Williamson Tunnels started.
1810		Prince's Half-Tide Dock built.
1813		Nelson Monument, Liverpool unveiled.
1814	March	John Gladstone sent out to Calcutta the 512-ton ship Kingsmill, under the command of captain Cassell, the first Liverpool vessel to trade direct with India, thus pioneering the port's subsequent great commerce with the east. There is no doubt that pressure from Liverpool and the ports contributed to the eventual end of the monopoly of the East India Company.
1	Population	165,967 13th largest in Europe.
1815		The ship Liverpool trades with India after the East India Company monopoly was lost.
1815		Manchester Dock built.
1815		Paddle steamer Elizabeth becomes the first steamship to operate as the Mersey Ferry.
1816		Leeds and Liverpool Canal constructed.
1816		Swire is founded with John Samuel Swire taking the reins in 1847.
1817		Liverpool Royal Institution established.
1818		Black Ball Line in business, becoming the first scheduled trans-Atlantic crossing and the first to sail between America and European ports on regular schedules, with packet ships running between Liverpool and New York City.
1818		Thomas Royden & Sons shipbuilding in business.
1819	20 June	SS Savannah arrived in Liverpool completing the first-ever transatlantic voyage partially powered by steam power, the vessel stayed in Liverpool for 25 days, the ships arrival is widely recognised as a major milestone in maritime history and marked the beginning of the steamship era.
1820		The sealing vessel Hannah is wrecked at Hannah Point, Liverpool Beach in Antarctica.
1821		Prince's Dock built.
1822		City of Dublin Steam Packet Company operates Steamships between Liverpool and Dublin.
1822		The old St John's Market was designed by John Foster Junior and built.
1822	April 22	RMS St Patrick launched by Mottershead & Hayes of Liverpool.
1823		Marine Humane Society founded.
1824–1828		John Laird pioneer shipbuilder goes into business with his father William Laird establishing William Laird & Son.
1825		Liverpool Mechanics' School of Arts and Philomathic Society established, Liverpool College of Art oldest outside London.
1826		St James Cemetery laid out.
1826		Old Dock closed.
1827		Law Society established.
1828		Baths and wash houses in Britain first established in Liverpool.
1828		Engineer William Fawcett pioneered the paddle steamer William Fawcett on its maiden voyage, the earliest first P&O ship.
1829		Canning Dock opens.
1829	October	Stephenson's Rocket wins Rainhill trials.
1830	15 September	The Liverpool and Manchester Railway, the world's first inter-city railway.
1830		The Crown Street railway station, the first ever train shed, opened.
1830		The Broad Green railway station is the world's oldest railway station in continuous use.
1830		The Wapping Tunnel opened.
1830		The Liverpool Rubber Company was founded, credited with designing the first rubber-soled sports shoes, attaching canvas as uppers to rubber soles. These early shoes, sometimes called Plimsoll (shoe), are considered by many to be the first Sneakers or British Trainers.
1830		Isle of Man Steam Packet Company is the world's oldest continuously operating passenger shipping company.
1830		Liverpool merchant James Atherton, founded the seaside resort New Brighton, Merseyside, with the UK's longest promenade.
1831		Population is 257,205
1831		Engineer William Fawcett, pioneer of the SS Royal William, is credited with being the first crossing of the Atlantic Ocean almost entirely under steam power, and was the largest passenger ship on the world.
1831		Bank of Liverpool in business.
	17 August	Sinking of the PS Rothsay Castle 130 lives lost at sea
1832		Kitty Wilkinson opened a public wash house during the 1826-1837 cholera pandemic that killed 1,523 people. The epidemic caused widespread fear and led to riots in the city.
1832		Church of St Luke built.
1832		Brunswick Dock opened.
1832		Allan Line establish office in Liverpool.
1833		The Liverpool East India Association group efforts contributed to the East India Company monopoly being broken with China the Port of Liverpool direct trade with the east expanding rapidly after the East India Company Act 1833.
1834		Waterloo Dock built. India Buildings built, financed by George Holt (cotton-broker) on Water Street to celebrate the end of the East India Company monopoly on trade in the Far East.
1835		City boundaries expand.
1835		The oldest Chinese community in Europe dates back to the arrival of the first direct vessels from China to Liverpool to trade in Silk, Cotton and Tea.
1835		First elected Town Council replaces Common Council.
		George & Richard Booker established the Booker Line
1836		Literary, Scientific and Commercial Institution and Liverpool Town Borough Police established.
1836		Liverpool & London & Globe Insurance established.
1836	August	The world's oldest main line terminus Liverpool Lime Street railway station opens.
1837		Liverpool Chess Club formed.
1838		Isambard Kingdom Brunel designed the SS Great Western, the largest passenger ship in the world. It sailed from Liverpool between 1842 and 1846.
1838		Gustav Christian Schwabe, financier of Bibby Line, Harland & Wolff and the White Star Line shipping line, moves to Liverpool.
1839		The first British ocean-going iron warship the Nemesis, built by John Laird Sons & Company and George Forrester and Company.
1839		Customs House Built.
1839		Royal Insurance Building, for Royal Insurance, is completed.
1839	26 February	The Grand National was inaugurated at Aintree Racecourse, where Lottery won the 1839 Grand National.
1840		Liverpool College
1840		Liverpool Philharmonic Society founded.
1840		Liverpool Hebrew Education institution formed, the first Jewish day school in Liverpool and the first in England outside London.
1840		Coburg Dock opened.
1840	4 July	Liverpool was the birthplace of Cunard with the first transatlantic crossing of RMS Britannia departing from Liverpool to Boston.
1841		International Cotton Association formed, the first president George Holt (elected 1842)
1842		St. Francis Xavier's College established.
1842		Robertson Gladstone becomes mayor.
1843		Princes Park laid out.
1844		Canning Half Tide Dock opens.
1844		Royal Mersey Yacht Club established.
1845		White Star Line was founded by John Pilkington and Henry Wilson. It focused on the UK-Australia trade, which increased following the Victorian gold rush in 1951.
1845		Lamport and Holt merchant shipping company business.
1845	26 July	Isambard Kingdom Brunel's pioneering SS Great Britain makes her maiden voyage, as the largest ship in the world and the first iron steamer to cross the Atlantic Ocean.
	August 20	Cataraqui immigrant ship departs from Liverpool, that sailed to Australia, Australia’s worst-ever maritime disaster claiming the lives of 400 people.
1846		Royal Albert Dock opens.
1847	1 January	William Henry Duncan is appointed as the Liverpool Medical Officer of Health. His appointment made Liverpool the first city in the world to establish such a position.
1847	10 March	Kate Sheppard is born, led the push for change, New Zealand was the first self governing country in the world to give all woman the right to vote paving the way for other countries to follow.
1848		The first integrated sewerage system in the world was made, preventing raw sewage from contaminating drinking water. Life expectancy in Liverpool was 19 years old and doubled after appointed engineer James Newlands retired.
1848		Liverpool, Crosby and Southport Railway opened.
1848		Bramley-Moore Dock, Victoria Tower, Stanley Dock, and the Bank of England Building were all built.
1848		Cope Bros & Co in business.
1848		Church of Saint Francis Xavier consecrated.
1848	24 August	The barque Ocean Monarch and frigate Dom Afonso sail from Liverpool. Ocean Monarch caught fire with Dom Afonso involved in the rescue, with the loss of 178 lives near Liverpool.
1849		Cholera claims 5,308 lives in Liverpool, the highest number outside of London.
1849		Philharmonic Hall opens.
1849		Victoria Tunnel, home to the largest iron wire rope ever manufactured, and Waterloo Tunnel opened, connecting the Edge Hill railway station to Liverpool Riverside railway station.
1849		Gustav Wilhelm Wolff settles in Liverpool from the age of fifteen spending most of his working life co-founding the Harland & Wolff shipyard in 1861.
1849		Edwin Waterhouse co-founded account practice of Price Waterhouse, that now forms part of PwC opening its first office outside of London in Liverpool in 1904.

Maps of Liverpool
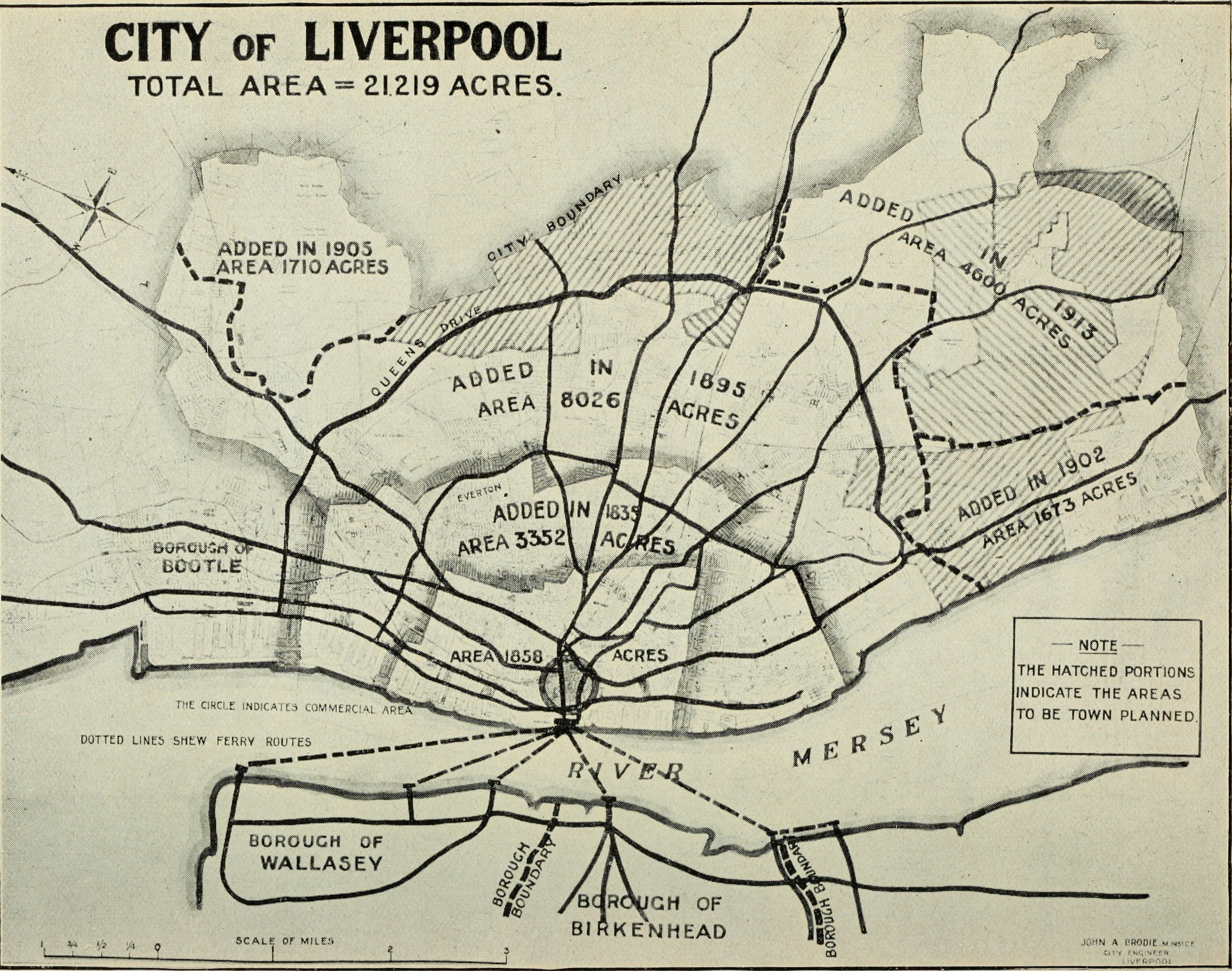
Expansions of Liverpool boundaries in 1835, 1895, 1902, 1905 and 1913.

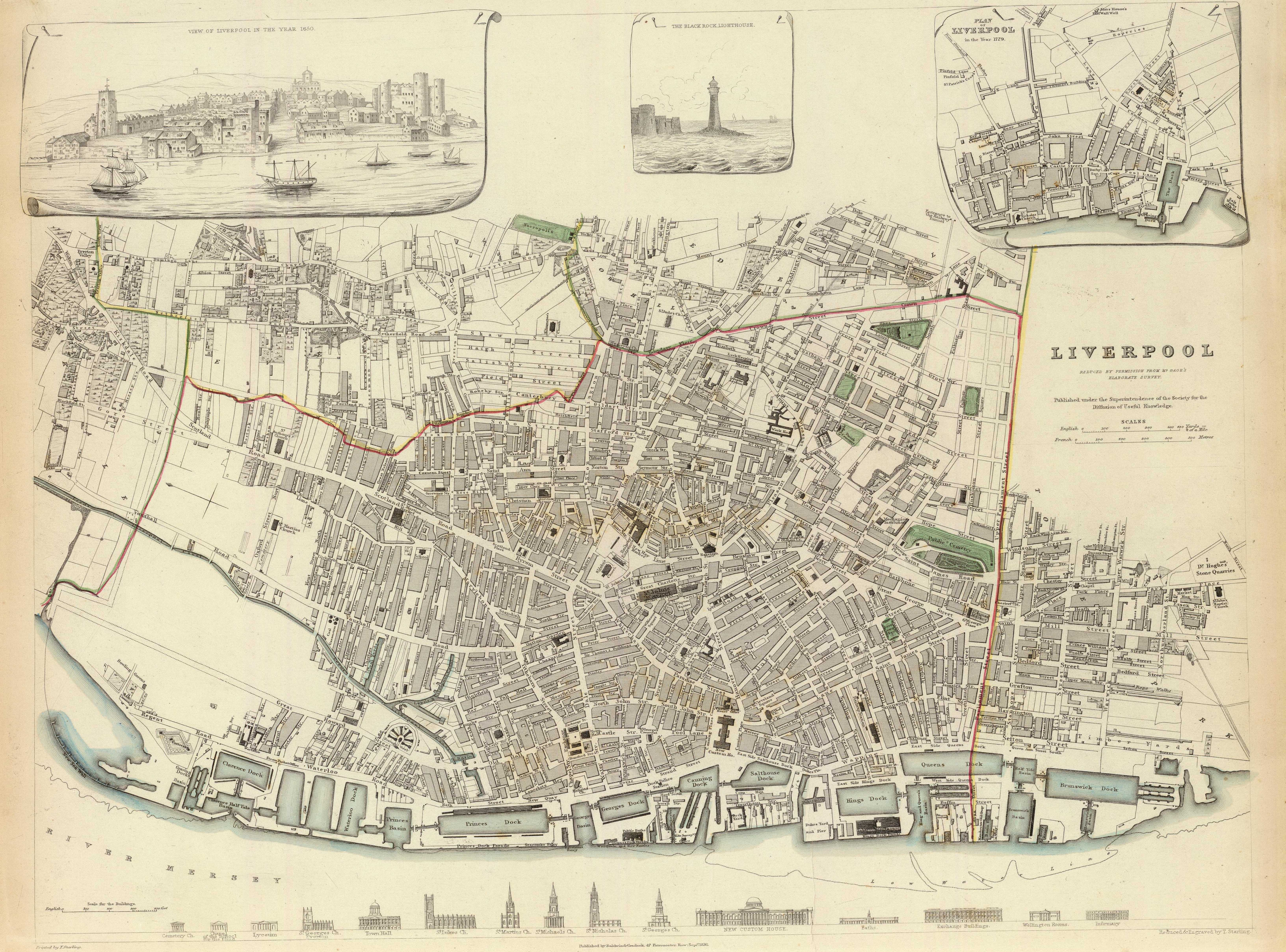
Map of Liverpool, 1836.

=== 1850s–1890s ===
Year	Date	Event
1850		Catholic Institute established.
1850		Liverpool, Philadelphia & New York Steamship Company in business.
1851		Queen Victoria and Prince Albert visited Liverpool and St George's Hall.
1851		The Derby Museum opens.
1851		Balfour Williamson in business.
1851		James Baines & Co. in business. James Baines Black Ball Line has a fleet of 86 ships. The Australian Packets include the Champion of the Seas, Flying Cloud, James Baines, Marco Polo, Sovereign of the Seas and Lightning.
1852		African Steamship Company in business.
1852		Wapping Dock built.
1852		Huskisson Dock built.
1852		Liverpool Free Public Library and Liverpool Sailors' Home opens.
1852		A quarter of the city's population is Irish, a legacy of the Great Irish Famine.
1853		Population of Liverpool is 384,263, becoming the second largest in the British Empire after London and the 8th largest in Europe, contributed from the migration due to the Great Irish Famine.
1853		Port of Garston built.
1853		Harrison Line in business.
1854	21 January	RMS Tayleur a full-rigged ship sank on its maiden voyage from Liverpool, 370 lives were lost.
1854	1 March	SS City of Glasgow set out from Liverpool on passage to United States with 480 on board. She is lost without a trace.
1854	18 September	St George's Hall officially opened to the public.
	20 September	SS Arctic last voyage from Liverpool of the SS Arctic disaster sinking with the loss of 322 lives, The fate of the Arctic let to the much needed reforms in maritime safety arrangements, including lifeboat provision and the establishment of Atlantic Sea lanes.
1855		Liverpool Daily Post begins publication.
1855	February	Economic unrest.
	23 January	186 to 200 people are believed to have lost their lives when the SS Pacific disappeared after departing from Liverpool.
1856		Lewis's shop in business.
1856		The Albany is built.
1856	26 January	RMS Persia maiden voyage, Blue Riband winner, the first Atlantic record breaker constructed of iron, and was the largest ship in the world at time of launch.
	May 20 May 26	Clown-class gunboat and HMS Kestrel built by William Cowley Miller at Toxteth Dock
1857		Mersey Docks & Harbour Board established.
1857		Liverpool St Helens F.C. formed the world's oldest open rugby club.
1857		John West Foods in business.
1858		Liverpool, London and Globe Building built. The Ma Roberts built, by John Laird shipyards is widely considered as the world's first steel ship, it was commissioned for David Livingstone Second Zambezi expedition to explore the Zembezi River in East Africa
1859	October 26	Royal Charter Storm
1860	February 19	Allan Line SS Hungarian met a tragic end during her scheduled transatlantic voyage from Liverpool with the loss of all 205 passengers and crew on board.
1860		The William Brown Library and Museum building opens.
1860		Isambard Kingdom Brunel's ship SS Great Eastern made its maiden voyage from Liverpool and held the title of being the world's largest ship for forty years, she was nearly six times larger than any vessel yet built.
1860		The Fiery Cross was built at the Chaloners shipyard in Liverpool and was one of the most successful tea chippers in history, winning four times before competing in the Great Tea Race of 1866.
1861		Old Swan Tramway opened.
1862		William Rathbone VI founded the world's first District nursing and established the Queen's Nursing Institute.
1862	10 May	RMS Scotia maiden voyage, Blue Riband winner, the last ocean-going paddle steamer.
1863		British & Foreign Marine established.
1863		Alfred Booth and Company shipping line established.
	19 September	SS Snaefell collided with Mersey flat Mary Agnes, Mary Agnes sank with the loss of two lives, survivors were rescued by HMS Warrior in its visit to Liverpool.
1864		Garston and Liverpool Railway opened.
1864		Oriel Chambers is built and becomes the world's first metal-framed curtained wall building, designed by Peter Ellis.
		SS Bohemian (1859) final voyage from Liverpool.
1865		James Iredell Waddell commanded the Liverpool ship CSS Shenandoah, which was surrendered in Liverpool, marking the last official surrender of the American Civil War.
1865		Compton House department store destroyed by fire.
1866		Blue Funnel Shipping Line was a British shipping company that operated merchant ships from 1866 until 1988.
1866	1 August	The National Olympian Association (promoted by John Hulley of Liverpool)
1867		The Welsh Presbyterian Church is built, making it Liverpool's tallest building at that time.
1867		The Exchange Buildings is completed.
1867		The Compton Hotel is rebuilt.
1868		Elder Dempster and Company is in business.
1868		Newsham Park opens.
1868		Owen Owen opens his drapery business.
1869		The first paternoster lift is built in Liverpool.
1869		The West Coast Main Line, connecting Liverpool to London bypassing Manchester, is completed.
1869		The Conservative local authority builds the first council housing in Europe, St Martin's Cottages (tenement flats) in Ashfield Street, Vauxhall.
1869		Fowler's Buildings is constructed.
1869		Municipal Buildings is built.
1869		Liverpool Tramways Company opened.
1869		Royal Liverpool Golf Club was established.
1869	6 September	Ocean Steam Navigation Company is founded by Thomas Henry Ismay after the purchase of the bankrupt White Star Line.
1869	14 October	SS City of Brussels maiden voyage. She sinks in the River Mersey, with the loss of 10 lives in January 1883.
1870		Stanley Park opens.
1870		Greek Orthodox Church of St Nicholas built.
1870		Allerton Priory built, designed by Alfred Waterhouse.
1870		Incorporated Society of Liverpool Accountants formed.
1870		William Imrie joined White Star Line at Broughton Hall West Derby.
1870		Dominion Line in business.
1870		Inman Line's SS City of Boston departed Halifax, Nova Scotia. On its passage to Liverpool, it was lost with all 191 people on board.
1871		North Western Hotel built, designed by Alfred Waterhouse.
1871	2 March	SS Oceanic maiden voyage, sometimes referred to as the ‘Mother of Modern liners’ the Oceanic was the first ship to have protected decks and bathtubs with running water for passengers.
1872		Sefton Park opens.
1872		Midland Railway Goods Warehouse built.
1873		Liverpool–Manchester lines opened by Cheshire Lines Committee.
1873		F.Witty shipping agency established, Authur and Ernest Witty key figures in FC Barcelona foundation and early years, with Arthur later serving as the Club President.
1873		Leyland Line in business.
1873		SS Atlantic, sailing from Liverpool to New York, struck rocks and sank off Nova Scotia. Around 535 lives were lost.
1874		Liverpool Central railway station opens.
1874		Liverpool Institute High School for Girls established.
1874		Princes Road Synagogue consecrated.
1874		ARA Uruguay launched by the Laird Brothers.
1874		Newsham Park Hospital built, designed by Alfred Waterhouse.
1875	29 April	SS City of Berlin maiden voyage.
1875	27 September	Full-rigged ship Ellen Southard is wrecked off of Liverpool. 12 crew and life boat men are lost.
1876	Population	539,468 9th largest in Europe.
1877		Walker Art Gallery opens. Clan Line founded.
1878		Everton football club founded.
1879		Picton Reading Room built.
1879		Liverpool Echo newspaper begins publication.
1879		The world's first Christmas grotto opened in David Lewis's Liverpool department store.
1879		North Liverpool Extension Line outer rail loop opens.
1880		Liverpool attains city status.
1880		Aigburth Cricket Ground built.
1880		Prince foods in business. Liverpool versus Calcutta, 1880
1883	19 April	The Liverpool National Society for the Prevention of Cruelty to Children (LSPCC) opened, becoming the world's first specialised child cruelty protection society. LSPCC was founded by Thomas Agnew in Liverpool, 6 years before the NSPCC.
1881		University College Liverpool chartered.
1881		Liverpool Central High Level railway station introduced 40 minute journey services to Manchester Central.
1881	November 26	SS Servia made its maiden voyage from Liverpool. It was the first large ocean liner to be built of steel instead of iron, and the first Cunard Line ship to have electric lighting installed.
1881		Langton Dock built.
1882		Cunard Line SS Cephalonia launched by Laird Brothers this ocean liner was the largest ship built on the River Mersey at the time.
1883		Municipal Annexe built.
1884		The Anfield athletic space opens.
1884		Turner home built, designed by Alfred Waterhouse.
1884		County Sessions House, Gustav Adolf Church, and Picton Clock Tower built.
1884		Everton Road drill hall completed.
1884	1 November	RMS Umbria maiden voyage, Blue Riband winner.
1885	25 April	RMS Etruria maiden voyage, Blue Riband winner.
1886		International Exhibition of Navigation, Commerce and Industry.
1886		The Mersey Railway Tunnel, James Street, and Hamilton Square railway station all open at the same time, becoming the first and oldest deep-level underground stations in the world.
1886		Prudential Insurance Building built. designed by Alfred Waterhouse.
1887		Liverpool Muslim Institute founded.
1887		Royal Jubilee Exhibition, Liverpool.
1887		Vestey Brothers meat retail company in business.
1888		Shakespeare Theatre opens.
1888	1 August	SS City of New York maiden voyage, largest ship in commission, the first twin-screw liner, most famous for a near-disaster with the RMS Titanic 24 years later.
1889		Florence Institute for Boys is established in Dingle.
1889		Liverpool Royal Infirmary built, designed by Alfred Waterhouse.
1889	3 April	City of Paris maiden voyage.
1889	7 August	RMS Teutonic maiden voyage.
1890		Liverpool and North Wales Steamship Company began operating.
1890		John Ball wins The Open Championship at Royal Liverpool Golf Club.
1890		Bowes Museum of Japanese Art Work opens.
1890	2 April	RMS Majestic maiden voyage, Blue Riband winner.
1891		Everton F.C. wins the Football League First Division for the first time when Anfield was the home ground for the club.
1891	8 February	Empress of India maiden voyage.
1891	11 April	Empress of Japan maiden voyage.
1891	15 July	Empress of China maiden voyage.
1892		The Goodison Park athletic field is inaugurated.
1892		Victoria Building of the University of Liverpool is constructed, designed by Alfred Waterhouse.
1892		Robert Durning Holt becomes mayor.
1892		Liverpool Football Club founded.
1892		Harold Hilton wins The Open Championship at the Royal Liverpool Golf Club.
1893		The Liverpool Overhead Railway begins operating.
1893	19 February	White Star Line SS Naronic, the largest cargo ship in operation, sinks with 74 casualties.
1893	22 April	RMS Campania maiden voyage, world's largest ship and Blue Riband winner.
1893	2 September	RMS Lucania maiden voyage, world's largest ship and Blue Riband winner, the two sister ships made maritime history by exchanging the first Marconi Wireless transmission.
	Population	659,757 10th largest in Europe.
1894		William Ewart Gladstone left office at the age of 84, being both the oldest person to serve as prime minister and the only prime minister to have served four non-consecutive terms.
1894	13 October	Everton F.C. and Liverpool F.C. meet for the first Merseyside derby.
1895		Oliver Lodge sent a wireless morse code message, the world's first from the Jubilee Clock Tower at University College Liverpool, credited before Marconi Wireless.
1896		Auguste and Louis Lumière is among the earliest film of Liverpool Overhead Railway shot from a moving train as it moves past Liverpool docks.
1897		Harold Hilton wins The Open Championship at the Royal Liverpool Golf Club.
1898		Liverpool School of Tropical Medicine founded.
1898		White Star Building constructed.
1898		Philharmonic Dining Rooms constructed.
1898		Liverpool Tramways Company closed.
1899		Liverpool University Press founded.
1899	6 September	RMS Oceanic maiden voyage, largest ship in the world.
1899–1900		George's Dock closed and filled in.

== 20th century ==
=== 1900s–1940s ===
Year	Date	Event
1900		Major alternations to Liverpool Town Hall.
1901		Population is 684,958.
1901		Sebastian Ziani de Ferranti founded Ferranti, the British electrical company that built and produced the Ferranti Mark 1, the world's first electrical commercial computer, as well as the Ferranti Pegasus.
1901		Liverpool F.C. wins the Football League First Division, first major honour for the club.
1901		Stanley Dock Tobacco Warehouse constructed.
1901	July 25	RMS Celtic maiden voyage was completed, the first ship larger than Isambard Kingdom Brunel's SS Great Eastern.
1902		City boundaries expand to include Aigburth, Cressington and Grassendale.
1902		Royal Insurance Building built.
1903		The world's first full conversion of steam to electric railway, Mersey Railway.
1903	11 February	RMS Cedric maiden voyage, world's largest ship.
1903	5 May	RMS Carpathia maiden voyage, made briefly famous for rescuing 712 survivors from the Titanic lifeboats.
1903	29 June	RMS Baltic maiden voyage, world's largest ship.
1903	17 December	RMS Republic maiden voyage. Transmitted the first-ever wireless CQD distress call, which led to the rescue of over 1,500 people in 1909, it was the largest ship to sink in history at that time.
1904		Foundation stone of the Anglican Cathedral is laid by King Edward VII.
1905		Calderstones Park created.
1905		Grand Central Hall built.
1905	31 March	Frank Mason wins the 1905 Grand National on Kirkland owned by Frank Bibby of the Bibby Line.
1905	27 July	Hall Road rail accident a train collision resulting in 20 people being killed.
1906		Liverpool Cotton Exchange Building constructed.
1906		Liverpool F.C. win the 1905–06 Football League
1906		Everton F.C. win the 1906 FA Cup final.
1906	29 June	RMS Empress of Ireland maiden voyage.
1907		Dock Office built.
1907		Sir William Bowring, 1st Baronet gave Liverpool the first municipal golf course in England in Bowring Park, Merseyside.
1907	August	700th anniversary of city founding.
1907	May 8	RMS Adriatic maiden voyage, first ocean liner to have an indoor swimming pool and Victorian-style Turkish baths.
1907	7 September	RMS Lusitania maiden voyage, Blue Riband winner.
1907	16 November	RMS Mauretania maiden voyage, Blue Riband winner.
1908		Population is 753,203.
1908		Meccano Ltd in business.
1908		William Watson racing driver, wins the RAC Tourist Trophy motor race.
1909		The world's first Department of Civic Design, which later spawns the town planning movement, is set up at the University of Liverpool.
1909		Bedford picture house opens first cinema in Walton.
1909	June	Catholic-Protestant conflict.
1910		White Star Line ship Mersey became the first sailing ship to be fitted with a radio.
1911		1911 Liverpool general transport strike.
1911		Royal Liver Building constructed, Europe's tallest building between 1911 and 1940 and the UK's tallest building between 1911 and 1961.
1911		Blue Star Line shipping company established, by Vestey brothers, pioneered refrigeration shipping, that changed the lives of millions of people, especially those who lived in crowded industrial cities.
1911		Rodewald Concert Society founded.
1911	1 June	RMS Titanic's sister ship RMS Olympic arrived in Liverpool to be registered and opened to the public, having both ships being launched the previous day in Belfast.
1912		Lime Street Picture House opens.
1912	5 April	SS Californian, known for not coming to the aid of the Titanic despite being close to the ship, leaves Royal Albert Dock, Liverpool.
1912	15 April	During the sinking of the Titanic, Frederick Fleet sighted the iceberg, with at least 115 crewmen from or having close connections to Liverpool being on board, where only 28 of them survived.
1913		Crane's Music Hall opens.
1913	1 April	RMS Empress of Russia maiden voyage.
1914	28 July	World War I starts.
1914		The second largest mobilisation of men in Liverpool was for the Royal Navy, where more than 12,000 Liverpool men signed up to fight in the war at sea. As a consequence of these large numbers, there were men from Liverpool on every single battleship between 1914 and 1918. Cammell Laird built five light cruisers, six destroyers, two escorts and eight submarines for the Royal Navy, including HMS Birkenhead and HMS Chester, which took part in the Battle of Jutland.
1914	14 March	Reconstructed Adelphi Hotel is opened by the Midland Railway.
1914	29 May	RMS Empress of Ireland sinks with the crew almost entirely from Merseyside.
1914	30 May	RMS Aquitania, maiden voyage, only ship to serve in both World War I and World War II as an Auxiliary cruiser, Troopship and Hospital ship.
1914	27 August	Edward Stanley, 17th Earl of Derby, launches the Liverpool Pals battalions scheme.
1914	29 September	HMS Caroline launched by Cammell Laird, the last surviving ship from the Battle of Jutland making her the second oldest ship in the Royal Navy history after HMS Victory.
1914	September 14	HMS Carmania sailed from Liverpool, she engaged and sank the German Merchant Cruiser SMS Cap Trafalgar, it was the world’s first battle between former Ocean liners.
1915	May 7 August 19 september 4	RMS Lusitania is torpedoed just a few hours short of Liverpool sunk with captain William Thomas Turner and many crew members from Liverpool on board. White Star SS Arabic left Liverpool for New York the following morning she was torpedoed without warning by SM U-24 the sinking helped trigger the Arabic Pledge. RMS Hesperian sets sail from Liverpool that was torpedoed and sunk by German submarine SM U-20.
1916	30 July	"Liverpool's blackest day" – 500 men in Liverpool Pals battalions are killed in an attack on Guillemont in the Battle of the Somme (following 200 deaths on the First day on the Somme).
1917		Cunard Building constructed.
1917		120,000 men from Liverpool went to fight in the First World War, around 14,000 of those men were killed in action, that means that one of every nine men who left home to fight in service never returned, just about every single family in the city was directly affected.
1917		During World War I, Ashworth Hospital became the first specialist hospital for what is now known as Post-traumatic stress disorder.
1917	April 6	American entry into World War I, and declared war on Germany, where more than 800,000 US soldiers came through Liverpool, Liverpool was the busiest of European ports used for disembarkation, White Star Line RMS Baltic was the first ship to transport the official vanguard of American troops and headquarters staff the Baltic anchoring at the mouth of the River Mersey marking the first official arrival of American soldiers in Europe on 7 June.
1918	18 July	HMS Snowdrop arrived back in Liverpool with the 218 survivors of the RMS Carpathia after being torpedoed three times by German submarine SM U-55.
1918	11 November	World War I ends, and the number of deaths of Merseyside in the first World War is 13,726, according to the Commonwealth War Graves Commission statistics.
1919		Cunard's luxury liner services moved to Southampton.
1920	5 February	The world's first fully welded ocean-going ship, the Fullagar, was launched by Cammell Laird. It was the first ship to replace rivets with electric arc welding, pioneering modern shipbuilding techniques.
1920	21 February	SS Imperator (known as RMS Berengaria) made her maiden passenger voyage for Cunard from Liverpool.
1921	12 March	Joe Fagan is born, the first English manager to win three trophies in one season, and the last of only four English managers to win the European Cup, .
1922–1923		Liverpool F.C. wins the Football League First Division Championship.
1923		Elon Musk grandmother Cora Robinson was born at 36 Bridge Road, Mossley Hill in 1923 and lived there until 1939.
1924		Arthur Johnson widely regarded as founding father of Real Madrid CF served as first captain, first official goal scorer, and first manager lives on Merseyside.
1925		Empire Theatre opens.
1927		A5058 road Queens Drive ring road completed.
1927		Gladstone Dock built.
1927		Woolton Picture House cinema opens.
1928	2 May	Everton F.C. wins the league title, Dixie Dean scores 60 goals in that season.
1929		Great Depression in the United Kingdom.
1930		Speke Airport, later Liverpool Airport, begins operating.
1930	28 June	MV Britannic maiden voyage, first major British motor-vessel (ship with diesel engines).
1931		Population is 855,688. This is the peak size of Liverpool's population.
1932		Martins Bank Building built.
1932		India Buildings built.
1932		Liverpool Stadium built.
1932	25 June	MV Georgic maiden voyage, Britain's largest motor vessel.
1933	26 June	Southport and Ainsdale Golf Club hosted the 1933 Ryder Cup.
1933	13 October	British Interplanetary Society founded, the oldest existing Space advocacy organisation in the world.
1934	10 May	Sir Percy Bates ship owner and chairman formation of the Cunard-White Star Line oversaw the launch of the Liverpool registered ocean liners the RMS Queen Mary and the RMS Queen Elizabeth in 1938.
1934		Atlantic Steam Navigation Company in business.
1934		Paramount Theatre opens.
1934	18 July	Royal opening of Queensway Tunnel by King George V, A580 road (Liverpool–East Lancashire Road, the UK's first intercity highway) and Walton Hall Park.
1934	20 September	Nel Tarleton challenged for the NBA and Ring World Featherweight title against American boxing champion Freddie Miller at Anfield Stadium.
1935	13 April	HMS Ark Royal launched by Cammell Laird. She was involved in the first aerial U-boat kill in World War II.
1935	12 June	Nel Tarleton challenged for the second time for the NBA and Ring World Featherweight title against Freddie Miller, losing on both occasions at the Stanley Greyhound Stadium.
1937	24 June	Southport and Ainsdale Golf Club hosts the 1937 Ryder Cup.
1937	11 December	Dixie Dean plays his last game for Everton F.C. scoring 383 goals in 433 appearances.
1938	28 July	RMS Mauretania launched by Cammell Laird.
1938	17 October	Royal Court Theatre built.
1939	May	Offshore production of Oil in Formby fields
1939		Exchange Flags built.
1939	22 April	Everton F.C. wins the English First Division for the fifth time.
1939	1 September	World War II officially starts, Great Britain and France declare war on Germany two days later on 3 September 1939.
1939	3 September	World War II war began at sea, less than eight hours after Britain had entered the war and two days after Germany precipitated the conflict by invading Poland. Lieutenant Fritz-Julius Lemp of U-30 disobeyed Hitler's orders and sank the liner SS Athenia en Route from Liverpool to Canada.
1940	14 June	RMS Lancastria departed from Liverpool on its final voyage and was sunk three days later off the coast of France, considered to be the worst disaster in British maritime history as 6,000 people lost their lives.
1940	1 July	The final voyage of the SS Arandora Star.
1940	28 August	Liverpool Blitz, the first major raid and bombing on Liverpool took place on the night when 160 German bombers attacked the city, approximately 70,000 people were made homeless due to widespread destruction of homes and buildings.
1940	13 September	The final voyage of the SS City of Benares.
1940	9 October	John Lennon is born at the Liverpool Maternity Hospital.
1941	7 February	Western Approaches Command Centre for the campaign waged against the German submarine fleet during the Battle of the Atlantic became based at Exchange Flags.
1941	26–28 May	Cammell Laird built HMS Prince of Wales, HMS Ark Royal, and HMS Rodney, all of which played a major role in the sinking of the German battle ship Bismarck during World War II. The shipyard produced nearly 200 commercial and military vessels in support of the British war effort.
1941	12 August	Operation Dervish departs from Liverpool.
1942	10 January	The Liverpool Blitz by German forces ends.
1942	18 June	Sir Paul McCartney is born.
1942	18 December	Convoy ON 154 departs from Liverpool.
1942	30 December	Liverpool-built special services vessel HMS Fidelity sinks.
1943	5 November	1.2 million United States soldiers pass through Liverpool during World War II. The first being 1st Infantry Division (United States) This figure represents a significant proportion of approximately 4.7 million troops who used the port to prepare for the invasion of Europe.
1943	25 February	George Harrison born at 12 Arnold Grove.
1944		Captain Frederic John Walker the most successful anti-submarine commander of the Second World War, being credited with 20 U-boats destroyed from various ships including Cammell Lairds HMS Kite.
1944		Penicillin was tested on a child for the first time at Alder Hey Children's Hospital, saving the child from pneumonia.
1944	17 July	Convoys to Liverpool during World War II typically consisted of 45 to 70 merchant ships, some smaller and some larger. Convoy HX 300 was the largest convoy of the war, comprising 166 ships. 1,285 convoys arrived in the Mersey during the war, an average of four per-week, putting a large amount of strain on Liverpool docks.
1944	8 September	A fatal explosion at ROF Kirkby (second one this year) kills 14 workers who were engaged on filling munitions.
1945		Liverpool shipowners lost over 3 million tons of shipping, with most losses occurring in the Atlantic Ocean, this equivalent to roughly 630 ships of 5,000 tons each, representing about a quarter of all British merchant shipping losses during the war, the Port of Liverpool also handled a massive amount of cargo, over 75 million tons between 1939 and 1945, with significant portion being war materials.
1945	8 May	World War II ends, marking it as the first VE Day. During the Liverpool Blitz, approximately 2,736 civilians were killed in Liverpool alone, with the total number of deaths across Merseyside being around 4,000.
	October to December	Over 20,000 men, women and children Allied Prisoners of War and civilian internees held by Japanese in the far east began returning to the Port of Liverpool with the arrivals from 22 different ships, some took part in medical trials and assessments at places such as the Liverpool School of Tropical Medicine.
1946		Approximately 130,000 Axiss Prisoners of War (mostly Germans) captured by Allies were brought to Liverpool (often previously being held in North America Camps) to provide Agriculture and Industrial labour in the Uk before being repatriated between 1947 and 1948. Liverpool Corporation begins development on Kirkby Industrial estate on a former ROF Kirkby.
1947		SS Ormonde, the first ship to bring significant number of British African-Caribbean people to the UK before the more famous HMT Empire Windrush.
1947		Liverpool F.C. wins the English First Division for the fifth time.
1948		Shipping pioneer Frank Bustard founded Atlantic Steam Navigation Company, the world's first Roll-on/roll-off ferry service.
1948	31 May	Canada Dock Branch railway closed to intermediate passengers.
1948	30 July	Liverpool became the first port in the world to open a shore-based Port radar Supervision Station at Gladstone Dock. The pioneering station was the world's first to use radar assistance for guiding ships through narrow channels and during low visibility conditions like fog. This system pioneered what is now known globally as Vessel traffic service.
1948	18 September	A record attendance of 78,299 at Goodison Park watched Everton F.C. play Football League First Division champions Liverpool F.C. in the Merseyside derby.
1949	19 March	The Cameo Cinema murder case.

=== 1950s–1990s ===
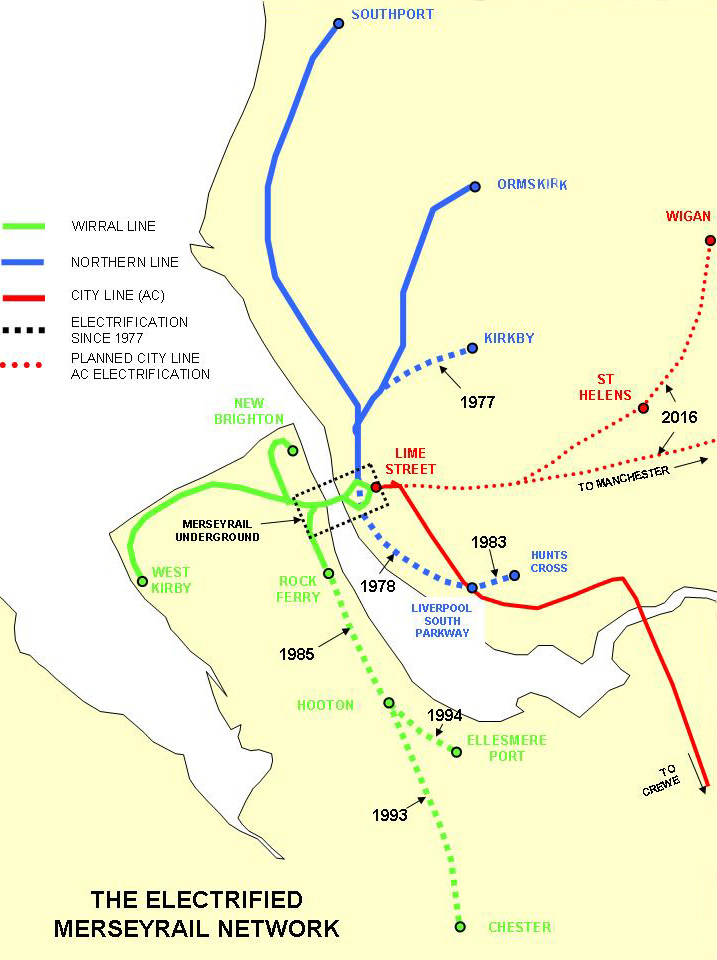
Merseyrail electrification

1950		Otterspool Promenade built.
1950	3 May	HMS Ark Royal, launched by Cammell Laird, is the first aircraft carrier constructed with an angled flight deck and steam catapults of new.
1951		A memorial at the Anfield Cemetery holds mass graves for 554 civilian victims of the Liverpool Blitz, with 373 of them unidentified.
1952		City twinned with Cologne, Germany.
1952	3 June	HMT Devonshire, owned by Bibby Line, set sail from Liverpool carrying The King's Regiment to The Korean war.
1952	12 November	Liverpool Naval Memorial commemorates over 1,400 men of the Merchant Navy who died serving in the Royal Navy who have no known graves.
1953		Liverpool Muslim Society founded.
1953	14 March	Lita Roza's "(How Much is) That Doggie in the Window" became the first number one hit by a Liverpool artist.
1953	27 July	Frank Sinatra performs in Liverpool for a week at the Liverpool Empire Theatre performing two shows each night during the week.
1955	16 July	Stirling Moss wins the 1955 British Grand Prix at Aintree Motor Racing Circuit.
1956		Tate & Lyle Sugar Silo built.
1956	20 April	Empress of Britain maiden voyage.
1956	30 December	Liverpool Overhead Railway urban rail transit system with fourteen stations last runs amid protest against closure.
1957	15 January	The Cavern Club opens as a jazz club.
1957	25 January	Frankie Vaughan's "The Garden of Eden" became the second number one hit by a Liverpool artist.
1957	18 April	RMS Empress of England maiden voyage.
1957	6 July	John Lennon and Paul McCartney of The Beatles first meet at a garden fete at St. Peter's Church, Woolton, at which Lennon's skiffle group, The Quarrymen (formed 1956), is playing (and in the graveyard of which an Eleanor Rigby is buried).
1957	20 July	1957 British Grand Prix held at Aintree Motor Racing Circuit.
1957	14 September	Liverpool Corporation Tramways close after the last tram runs in Liverpool, 88 years after the first.
1958		Liverpool Metropolitan Cathedral crypt completed to the design of Edwin Lutyens, but the remainder of his cathedral design is abandoned.
1958	14 February	Michael Holliday's "Story of My Life" became the third number one hit by a Liverpool artist.
1958	20 March	Buddy Holly and the Crickets perform in Liverpool at the Philharmonic Hall.
1958	May–June	The Quarrymen record "In Spite of All the Danger" at Phillips' Sound Recording Services in Liverpool.
1959	18 July	1959 British Grand Prix held at Aintree Motor Racing Circuit.
1959	1 December	Bill Shankly becomes manager of Liverpool F.C., and transformed the club and created The Boot Room.
1960		Tranmere Oil Terminal commissioned, handling 140 oil tankers a year.
1960	January	John Lennon's Liverpool College of Art friend Stu Sutcliffe joins his rock group and suggests they change their name to The Beatles.
1960	26 March	The Grand National is televised for the first time, The winner is Merrymen 11.
1960	22 June	Fire in Henderson's department store kills eleven.
1961	9 February	The Beatles perform at The Cavern Club for the first time following their return from Hamburg, marking it as George Harrison's first appearance at the venue. On 21 March, they play the first of nearly 300 regular performances at the club.
1961	24 April	RMS Empress of Canada maiden voyage.
1961	6 July	Mersey Beat begins publication.
1961	15 July	1961 British Grand Prix held at Aintree Motor Racing Circuit.
1961	9 November	Future manager Brian Epstein first sees The Beatles at the Cavern Club.
1962	24 January	Brian Epstein signs a contract to manage The Beatles.
1962	21 July	1962 British Grand Prix held at Aintree Motor Racing Circuit.
1962	18 August	Ringo Starr performed with The Beatles for the first time as The Fab Four at Hulme Hall, Port Sunlight.
1962	16 September	Liverpool and North Wales Steamship Company makes its last sailings.
1962	12 October	The Beatles first meet rock and roll pioneer Little Richard for the first time when they opened for him at Tower Ballroom in Merseyside seaside town New Brighton.
1963	3 August	The Beatles perform at The Cavern Club for the final time as they begin a run of chart success.
1963	5 November	The Rolling Stones perform at The Cavern Club.
1964		Everyman Theatre, Liverpool opened.
1964	22 January	The Yardbirds performed at The Cavern Club.
1964	9 February	The Beatles made their historic first appearance on The Ed Sullivan Show. This debut performance was viewed by 73 million viewers, making a watershed moment in Beatlemania.
1964	21 February	The Kinks performed at The Cavern Club.
1964	20 April	BBC Panorama programme featuring Liverpool F.C. famous Spion Kop captured the unique swaying atmosphere of 28,000 swaying fans, The filming took place during a match against Arsenal F.C. at Anfield exact day Bill Shankly Liverpool secured the First Division title with a resounding 5-0 victory, leading the crowd to belt out of hits like The Beatles hit She Loves You and You'll Never Walk Alone.
1964	10 May	Liverpool F.C. first-team squad appeared on The Ed Sullivan Show. The appearance occurred during the club's post-season tour of America and Canada shortly after they had been crowned champions of English First Division. They were in the audience to watch Gerry and the Pacemakers perform on the show.
1964	10 July	The Beatles return to Liverpool for their northern premiere of the film A Hard Day's Night, and were met with an estimated 200,000 adoring fans, the band flew into Speke Airport and were greeted by 3,000 fans, and the crowds lining the streets along the route.
1964	22 August	Liverpool F.C. was featured on the very first episode of Match of the Day. Liverpool played Arsenal at Anfield, with Liverpool winning 3–2. Liverpool striker Roger Hunt scored the first goal ever shown on the programme.
1964	8 November	Marks a monumental return for The Beatles as they arrived in their hometown amid the height of Beatlemania.
1965	1 May	Liverpool F.C. wins the FA Cup for the first time.
1965	27 August	Overseas Containers formed, Blue Funnel Line, Ocean Group plc formed a consortium with other British shipping companies.
1965	7 October	Royal Birkdale Golf Club hosts the 1965 Ryder Cup.
1965	31 October	The Who perform at The Cavern Club.
1965	5 December	The Beatles play their final live concert in Liverpool at the Liverpool Empire Theatre, after that date, they focused on studio recordings and international tours.
1966	12 January	Containerization developed in Liverpool, Associate Container Transport formed by five British shipping companies, including Blue Star Line, Cunard Line (Port line) and Harrison Line.
1966	23 January	16 year old Stevie Wonder performed at The Cavern Club.
1966	7 February	Elton John and his band Bluesology performed at The Cavern Club.
1966	16 April	Liverpool F.C. wins the 1966 First Division title.
1966	14 May	Everton F.C. wins the 1966 FA Cup final.
1966	11 June–30 July	Goodison Park hosted five matches of the 1966 FIFA World Cup throughout the tournament, being the most played outside of Wembley Stadium. With intercontinental communications satellites, it was the first tournament to gain widespread live coverage on three group games involving world champions Brazil, quarterfinal between Portugal and North Korea and the semi-final between West Germany and the Soviet Union.
1967		The Mersey Sound anthology of Liverpool poets published.
1967	25 February	The United Kingdom's second Polaris nuclear submarine HMS Renown was launched from Birkenhead.
1967	27 February	Chuck Berry performed at The Cavern Club after the 1964 album St. Louis to Liverpool.
1967	14 May	Liverpool Metropolitan Cathedral (Roman Catholic) consecrated.
1967	July–August	Liverpool Cotton Exchange Building partially demolished.
1967	22 November	BBC Radio Merseyside launched.
1968		Fifteen Guinea Special last mainline passenger steam locomotive service.
1968	30 January	RMS Franconia makes Cunard Line's last scheduled voyage from Liverpool.
1969		Radio City Tower built.
1969		St. John's Shopping Centre and Clayton Square Shopping Centre in business.
1969		Merseyside Passenger Transport Executive begins operation.
1969	9 September	Freddie Mercury performs in Liverpool with the band Ibex, which is notable because it was the first time he was joined on stage by future Queen band members Brian May and Roger Taylor during a time where he was living in Penny Lane.
1969	18 September	Royal Birkdale Golf Club hosts the 1969 Ryder Cup.
1969	15 November	The first Match of the Day broadcast in colour featured the match between Liverpool and West Ham United at Anfield.
1970	April 1	Everton F.C. clinched their 7th League title, after beating West Brom 2–0 at Goodison Park in front of 58,523 goals from Liverpool born Alan Whittle and Colin Harvey.
1970	April 10	Paul McCartney announces of the break-up of the Beatles.
1970	October 31	Queen's first major gig at The Cavern Club. This performance came roughly three years before the release of their self-titled debut album, it is often cited as their first major gig as Queen.
1971	January 30	George Harrison was the first ex-Beatle to have a number one hit with "My Sweet Lord".
1971	June 24	Royal opening of the Kingsway Tunnel by Queen Elizabeth II.
1971	July 3	Knowsley Safari Park officially opened.
1971	August 3	Paul McCartney and Wings formed.
1971	November 29	Led Zeppelin performed at the Liverpool Stadium.
1971	November 7	RMS Empress of Canada was the last traditional ocean liner to operate a scheduled year round service out of Liverpool, following the Canadian Pacific Steamships final voyage she was sold to Carnival Cruise Line becoming the very first ship of the Carnival Cruise fleet.
1972		Albert dock closed and Seaforth Dock. Begins operation.
1972		North Liverpool Extension Line closed after a century's operation and track lifted.
1972		Waterloo Tunnel, Victoria Tunnel (serving Waterloo branch from Edge Hill railway station to Liverpool Riverside railway station) and Wapping Tunnel are closed, 123 years after opening.
1972		Liverpool Central High Level railway station closed.
1973	April 23	Liverpool F.C. wins the Football League First Division for a record eighth time a record it would be held for the next 40 years.
1973	May 23	Liverpool F.C. win the 1973 UEFA Cup final.
1974		City becomes a metropolitan borough within the newly created metropolitan county of Merseyside; Merseyside County Council established.
1974		Post & Echo Building and New Hall Place constructed.
1974		Al-Rahma Mosque established. M57 motorway outer ring road completed and opened.
1974		Church Street, Liverpool is pedestrianised.
1975	November 14	Queen performed "Bohemian Rhapsody" for the first time live at Liverpool Empire Theatre during the A Night At The Opera Tour.
1976		M62 motorway junctions 4 to 6 (Tarbock) connecting Leeds and Manchester to Liverpool completed and opened.
1976		Home Bargains in business.
1976	May 4	Liverpool F.C. clinched their record ninth Football League First Division title.
1976	May 19	Liverpool F.C. win the 1976 UEFA Cup final for the second time in three years.

- 1977
  - May 25 Liverpool F.C. win the 1977 European Cup final the first English club to win the European Cup on the continent in Rome.
  - Liverpool Exchange railway station closes after opening 127 years before in 1850.
  - Moorfields railway station underground opens.
- 1978
  - 25 October Liverpool Cathedral is officially opened by Queen Elizabeth II after 74 years construction.
  - Garston railway reopened. The Garston line formed the southern portion of Merseyrail's Northern Line.
  - Liverpool F.C. win the European Cup becoming the first English club to win back to back The European Cup wins after the victory in 1977 European Cup final and retained it in 1978 European Cup final
- 1979
  - Michael Heseltine appointed Minister for Merseyside.
  - 18 December Fire at St. John's Shopping Centre.
- 1980
  - Merseyside Maritime Museum opens in the Royal Albert Dock, Liverpool complex.
  - September 9 MV Derbyshire lost during Typhoon Orchid (1980) with all 44 hands on board, 17 of the crew from the city of Liverpool. The largest British vessel lost at sea.
  - September 25: HMS Liverpool (D92) launched by Cammell Laird.
  - December 8 Murder of John Lennon in its aftermath 30,000 gathered in Liverpool to mourn the loss of the musician.
- 1981
  - May 27 Liverpool F.C. win the 1981 European Cup final against Real Madrid CF.
  - May 30 Visit by Pope John Paul II to Liverpool where a million spectators lined the route of his journey of Speke Airport to Liverpool Metropolitan Cathedral and Liverpool Anglican Cathedral.
  - July 3 1981 Toxteth riots.
- 1982
  - Mersey Television formed.
  - Chancellor Sir Geoffrey Howe circulates a cabinet memo arguing for "managed decline".
- 1983
  - Militant in Liverpool win control of the council.
- 1984
  - May 2 International Garden Festival opens.
  - May 19 Everton F.C. win the 1984 FA Cup final final.
  - May 30 Liverpool F.C. win the League Cup the League title and the fourth European Cup win against AS Roma in Rome, following this fourth title Liverpool held the position of the second most successful club in the competitions history, trailing only Real Madrid CF(who held 6 titles at that time).
  - August 1 Tall Ships Races begins to coincide with the opening of the Royal Albert Dock as a tourist destination.
- 1985
  - Militant in Liverpool set illegal council budget.
  - Everton F.C. win the League title and UEFA Cup Winners' Cup.
- 1986
  - Liverpool Airport Southern Terminal opens.
  - 1986 FA Cup final was a Merseyside derby. The match was played seven days after Liverpool F.C. secured the League Title completing the domestic double.
- 1987
  - Everton F.C. win the Football league championship.
  - Brookside begins broadcasting.
- 1988
  - May 24 Tate Liverpool (modern art museum) opens in the Royal Albert Dock.
  - September 11 Michael Jackson concluded the European leg of his Bad (tour) with a sold-out performance before 125,000 people at Aintree Racecourse and it remains one of the largest concerts by a solo artist ever held in the UK.
- 1989
  - Everton Park opened.
  - 15 April The Hillsborough disaster happens. 97 Liverpool F.C. supporters are killed as the result of a crowd crush at Sheffield stadium.
  - 20 May 1989 FA Cup final was a Merseyside derby played 35 days after the Hillsborough disaster.

Year	Date	Event
1990		Liverpool F.C. wins the Football League First Division for a record 18th time.
1991		Population is 452,450.
1992		Cream nightclub begins.
1992		Africa Oyé music festival begins.
1992	9 May	Liverpool wins the 1992 FA Cup final.
1992	16 August	The first live televised Premier League game between Liverpool FC and Nottingham Forest to be broadcast on Sky Sports.
1993		Museum of Liverpool Life opens.
1993	27 May	Western Approaches Museum opens.
1993		Liverpool Mathew Street Music Festival begins.
1993	19 December	Oasis records their debut single "Supersonic" at Pink Museum studio.
1995		Everton F.C. wins the 1995 FA Cup final.
1995		Liverpool F.C. wins the 1995 League Cup final
1996	18 January	The first oil flowed in the Oil fields of Douglas Complex in Liverpool Bay
1996		Anfield hosts a total of four matches during UEFA Euro 1996 including three group-stage fixtures and a quarter-final.
1997		Liverpool twinned with Dublin, Ireland.
1999		Liverpool twinned with Shanghai, China. A Chinese arch gifted from Shanghai is the largest in Europe, Liverpool's Chinese community is the oldest in Europe.

== 21st century ==
- 2001
  - Liverpool Wall of Fame unveiled.
  - Liverpool Airport officially renamed after John Lennon.
  - Liverpool F.C. win a Cup winning treble of League Cup, FA Cup and UEFA cup.
- 2002 – Liverpool International Tennis Tournament begins.
- 2003
  - Liverpool twinned with Rio de Janeiro, Brazil.
  - 4 November: Brookside last broadcast.
- 2004
  - Liverpool Maritime Mercantile City registered as a World Heritage Site with UNESCO.
  - Homotopia festival begins.
- 2005
  - Liverpool F.C. win the Champions League for the fifth time.
  - Another Place sculpture at Crosby Beach.
- 2006
  - Royal Standard art gallery established on Mann Street.
  - 11 June: Liverpool South Parkway railway station opens in Garston.
- 2007
  - Liverpool Cruise Terminal opens.
  - International Slavery Museum opens.
  - West Tower built.
  - Liverpool Shakespeare Festival begins.
- 2008
  - City designated a European Capital of Culture.
  - Echo Arena Liverpool, BT Convention Centre and Liverpool One open.
  - One Park West and Alexandra Tower built.
- 2010 – National Oceanography Centre established.
- 2011 – Museum of Liverpool opens on the waterfront.
- 2012 – Prime Minister David Cameron apologises for the cover-up and misinformation to those effected by the 1989 Hillsborough disaster.
- 2013
  - 19 December: Liverpool Post last published.
  - Cunard Line resume cruising from Liverpool with the Queen Mary 2, the largest ocean liner ever built.
- 2014
  - Liverpool City Region Combined Authority established including Liverpool, Halton, Knowsley, St Helens, Sefton and Wirral.
  - Liverpool TV launched.
- 2015
  - Liverpool named a UNESCO City of Music.
  - 24–26 May: Queen Mary 2, Queen Elizabeth and Queen Victoria visit Liverpool. The event marks the 175th anniversary of the Cunard Line founding in Liverpool and draws an estimated 1.3 million spectators on the waterfront, described as the biggest waterfront event in the city's history.
- 2016
  - 4 November: Liverpool2 container shipping port opened at Seaforth.
  - 6 November: Liverpool twinned with Panama City, Panama.
  - 20 October: The world's largest combination container Roll-on/roll-off ship, the Atlantic Star christened by Princess Royal in Liverpool.
- 2017
  - 8 May: Metro Mayor of the Liverpool City Region established including Liverpool, Halton, Knowsley, St Helens, Sefton and Wirral. Steve Rotheram is the first person elected to the office.
  - Liverpool twinned with Surabaya, Indonesia.
  - The Open Championship officially hosted for the 10th time to be played at Royal Birkdale Golf Club.
  - Wind turbine installed in Liverpool Bay
- 2018 – 14 July: Cammell Laird launches research vessel RRS Sir David Attenborough.
- 2019
  - First black Lord Mayor of Liverpool, Anna Rothery, appointed.
  - Liverpool F.C. win the Champions League for the sixth time, making them the third most successful club in the competition's history behind Real Madrid CF and AC Milan.
- 2020
  - 23 March: Liverpool goes onto a nationwide lockdown with the rest of the UK due to the COVID-19 pandemic.
  - 25 June: Liverpool F.C. win the 2019–20 Premier League, their first victory of the Premier League era.
  - 14 October: COVID-19 pandemic in the United Kingdom: Liverpool moves to the Tier 3 (very high) level of restriction.
  - 6 November: First UK covid mass testing piloted in Liverpool.
- 2021
  - 10 April: Rachael Blackmore makes history by becoming the first female to win the Grand National in the 182-year history.
  - 6 May: Joanne Anderson is elected city Mayor of Liverpool, the first directly elected black woman mayor of a major British city.
  - 21 July: Liverpool Maritime Mercantile City delisted as a World Heritage Site by UNESCO.
- 2022
  - 25 March: Yoko Ono Lennon Centre opened by Sean Lennon.
  - Liverpool F.C. win the League Cup and FA Cup
- 2023
  - 13 May: Liverpool hosts Eurovision Song Contest 2023.
  - June 16–23: 2023 Open Championship officially the 13th to be played at Royal Liverpool Golf Club.
- 2024
  - 14 June: Taylor Swift performs to a sold-out Anfield Stadium for a 3-night residency on the first UK dates in her The Eras Tour.
  - 3 June: MS Queen Anne first arrives in Liverpool for her maiden call and naming ceremony on the banks of the River Mersey, the 249th ship to fly under the Cunard flag.
  - 26 June: Isle of Man Ferry terminal relocates to Princes Dock.
- 2025
  - 11 February: The last Merseyside derby at Goodison Park. This 245th meeting in all competitions remains the most played fixture in English football history (211th in league).
  - 28 April: Liverpool F.C. secure the Premier League title, winning England's top division 20 times in history.
  - 24 August: Everton F.C. officially open Hill Dickinson Stadium.
  - 4–14 September: 2025 World Boxing Championships held at Liverpool Arena.
- 2026 – 16–19 July: 2026 Open Championship held at Royal Birkdale Golf Club for the 11th time.

== See also ==
- History of Liverpool
- List of Lord Mayors of Liverpool
