= Robert Steel (chess player) =

English chess player (1839–1903)

Robert Steel (1839–1903) was a notable businessman and internationally renowned chess player, originally from Liverpool.

Steel spent a considerable period in Calcutta (now Kolkata) in British India. Steel was described by the Times of India in 1898 as "one of the best known and most popular figures" in Calcutta, and "probably the finest chess player India has ever seen". The London Daily News similarly called Steel "the foremost player in India". Steel is credited with many efforts to popularise chess in India (ironically, the country where the game was initially born). Notably, he had conceived of and organised the historic Liverpool-Calcutta telegraph cable chess match in 1880 (having also been a former president of the Liverpool Chess Club). Steel was further joint winner of India's first round-robin chess tournament in Calcutta, held in 1878.

The first World Chess Champion, Wilhelm Steinitz, dedicated his book The Modern Chess Instructor to Steel, calling him "a generous patron of chess and chess masters". Steinitz also credited Steel with inventing an "ingenious" variation of the Giuoco Piano opening. Steinitz stated elsewhere that Steel had defeated him and "different first-class masters" in some unrecorded games.

Steel played with and against many well-known players of his era, such as James Mason, Joseph Henry Blackburne, Johannes Zukertort and Leopold Hoffer. In a modern assessment of Steel's game, Lubomir Kavalek termed a match that Steel played in India as one of the "immortal games" of chess history, and described Steel's methods as possessing a "certain craziness".

Steel reportedly belonged to "an old Liverpool family". He arrived in Calcutta from England in 1871, and retired and returned to England in 1898. He worked as a jute shipping merchant in Calcutta, heading the eponymous R. Steel & Co. He rose to become a member of the Viceroy's Executive Council, president of the Bengal Chamber of Commerce and Industry, and president of the Bengal Club, where he presided over a dinner in honour of Prince Albert Victor during his visit to Calcutta. He was also awarded the Companion of the Order of the Star of India, which the Times of India described as "a very high honour for a non-official and one which has only been twice so bestowed". Sir Henry Cotton described Steel as a businessman of "exceptional ability".
