= Liverpool versus Calcutta, 1880 =

Long-distance chess match

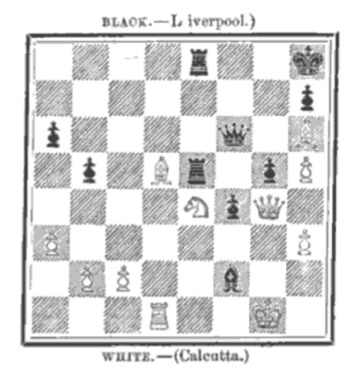
Final outcome of the first game between Liverpool and Calcutta, reported by The Chess Monthly (Calcutta resigning and Liverpool winning).

Liverpool versus Calcutta, 1880, was the world's first intercontinental, long-distance chess match.

== History ==
The match was played via electrical telegraph, predating and later inspiring the Anglo-American cable chess matches of 1896 to 1911. The match was played between the Liverpool Chess Club in Liverpool and a team from Calcutta (now Kolkata), over the course of several months. The match was proposed by Robert Steel, a wealthy businessman in Calcutta who was also a renowned chess player, in addition to being a former president of the Liverpool Chess Club. The British Chess Magazine reported that the match was "exciting great interest in chess circles all over the world", The Chess Monthly referred to the match as "the leading topic of chess conversation", the Chess Player's Chronicle called it "the most remarkable event of the kind", and the London Daily News similarly termed it "a most remarkable match in the history of chess."

At the time, a telegram from Liverpool to Calcutta cost four shillings and six pence a word (over GBP 20 in present-day valuation). However, a member of the Liverpool Chess Club devised a unique code which reduced time and expenses considerably. An updated version of the code was later used in the Anglo-American cable chess matches, though the latter was criticised as inferior to the code used in the Liverpool-Calcutta match.

The rules of the match required moves to be communicated within forty-eight hours. The match commended on 28 October 1880 and ended in March 1881. The Calcutta team was initially led by Steel, "assisted by two natives and an Anglo-Indian". However, Steel departed for Britain mid-way. In the end, two games were played, with Liverpool winning the first (after Calcutta resigned) and drawing the second, thus winning overall.

The "natives" who were Steel's teammates were reported to be "Baboo caste", i.e. Brahmins, but their names do not appear to be easily confirmable. A report from 1880 describes Baboo Ishur Chunder Gossain and Baboo Mahodeb Chowbey as two "eminent" players in India, and Steel and Gossain were declared joint winners of India's first round-robin chess tournament in Calcutta in 1878. It is, however, not clear if the two were also Steel's "Baboo caste" teammates. Similarly, the identity of Steel's Anglo-Indian teammate is difficult to confirm. Nevertheless, Steel's partnering with Indians in the same sports team contrasts with contemporaneous racially and religiously segregated sports in colonial India, such as cricket and football.
