= Post & Echo Building =

County building in Liverpool, Merseyside, England

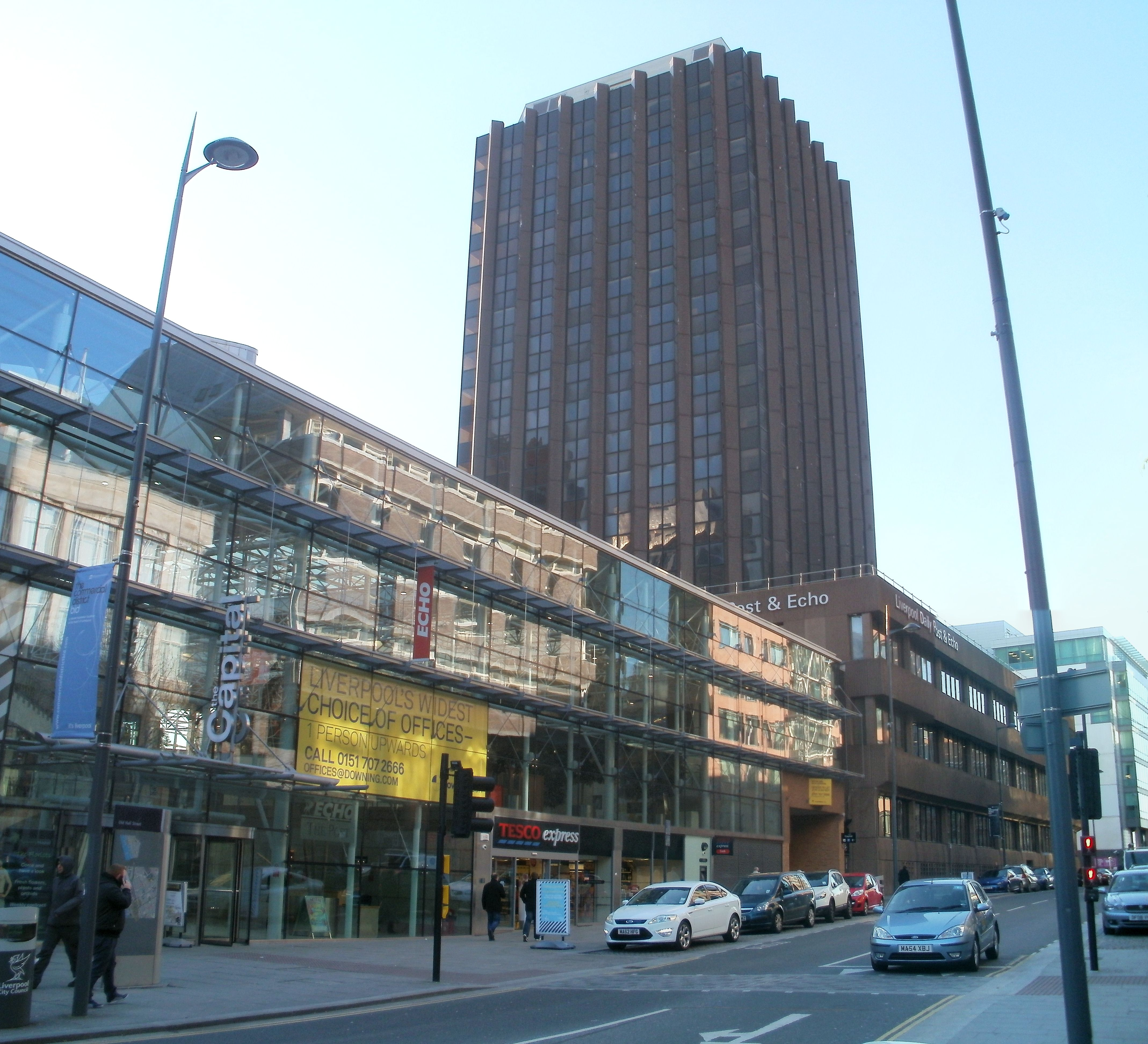
- The Post & Echo Building is easily distinguishable amongst the Liverpool skyline

- Location within Merseyside

General information
- Architectural style: International style
- Location: Old Hall Street, Liverpool, United Kingdom
- Coordinates: 53.4096°N 2.9954°W
- Completed: 1974

The Post & Echo Building, now occupied by Sony Interactive Entertainment Europe and the Meliã Liverpool Hotel, is located at 95 Old Hall Street in Liverpool city centre, England, and formerly housed the headquarters of the Liverpool Echo and Daily Post newspapers. It is also known as Metropolitan House and as City Tower. It is an international style-style building that stands 73 metres (240 ft) tall with 18 storeys, making it the joint-tenth-tallest building in the city.

== History ==
The building, which was designed in the international style, was completed in 1974. The Liverpool Echo and Daily Post, which had previously been based in Victoria Street, moved into the building shortly after it was completed. The newspapers were produced, printed and distributed on site with the upper half of the building being used as office space and the lower parts housing the newspapers' printing rooms and distribution centre. In 2008, Trinity Mirror Publishing announced that they were ceasing printing of the papers on site and that all printing would move to a site in Oldham.

The building was also used as the headquarters of Merseyside County Council from completion of the building until the abolition of the county council in 1986. The county council primarily used the building as office space for county officers and their departments: meetings of the full county council were held in the council chamber at Liverpool Town Hall.

The Liverpool Daily Post closed in December 2013 leaving the Echo the only paper being produced there and the Echo moved out of the building to newer offices on Old Hall Street in St Paul's Square in March 2018. Sony Interactive Entertainment Europe announced in August 2018 that they were planning to move 500 staff from their previous site in Wavertree Technology Park into the building.

Conversion work started in 2019 to diversify the usage of the building from solely office use to retail use and leisure use as well. The building became home to the INNSiDE by Meliã Liverpool Hotel, a 207-bed 4-star hotel operated by Spanish hotel group Meliã Hotels International. The work also created a restaurant and 360 SkyBar on the 18th floor branded by Gino D'Acampo.

Sony Interactive Entertainment Europe's move into the building was completed in 2022. The company employs about 500 people in the area, and the office space includes a café, staff gym & an expansive rooftop terrace.

== Using river water to heat and cool the building ==
The building was constructed simultaneously with the New Hall Place. Both buildings operated heat pumps to heat and cool the building using water from the adjacent River Mersey. Three thousand gallons of water per hour seeps into the Mersey railway tunnel from the river above, via the riverbed rock, which is a steady 13C temperature all year. This water was previously pumped out into the dock system. The heat pumps used this constant temperature water to heat the building, or as a heat sink to cool the building.
