= Old Liverpool Cotton Exchange Building =

Old Liverpool Cotton Exchange Building in Old Hall Street (built 1905; largely demolished 1967–69)
- Liverpool Cotton Exchange Building, Old Hall Street front

- Location in Liverpool
- 53.4090°N 2.9935°W
- Location: Old Hall Street, Liverpool, Merseyside, England
- OS grid reference: SJ 341 908

History
- Built: 1905–06
- Built for: Liverpool Cotton Exchange
- Demolished: 1967–69

Site notes
- Architect(s): Huon Arthur Matear and Frank Worthington Simon
- Architectural style: Baroque Revival architecture style

Listed Building – Grade II
- Designated: 14 March 1975
- Reference no.: 1363092

The Old Liverpool Cotton Exchange Building in Old Hall Street in Liverpool was a huge and superb Edwardian building designed by Huon Arthur Matear and Frank Worthington Simon, built by the Waring-White Building Company, and was officially opened by the Prince and Princess of Wales on 30 November 1906. The building cost around £300,000 build and the opening took place in the company of 3,000 guests. Its façade was in Neoclassical style, with Baroque towers at the angles. Its exterior decoration included statues. Inside the building was the latest technology for communicating with cotton trading elsewhere in the world, including telephones, and cables linking directly with New York, Bremen and Bombay. The Old Hall Street front of the Cotton Exchange by Matear & Simon in Baroque Revival architecture style was replaced in 1967–69 with a modern-style façade designed by Newton-Dawson, Forbes and Tate and the former main exchange hall was replaced by a courtyard.

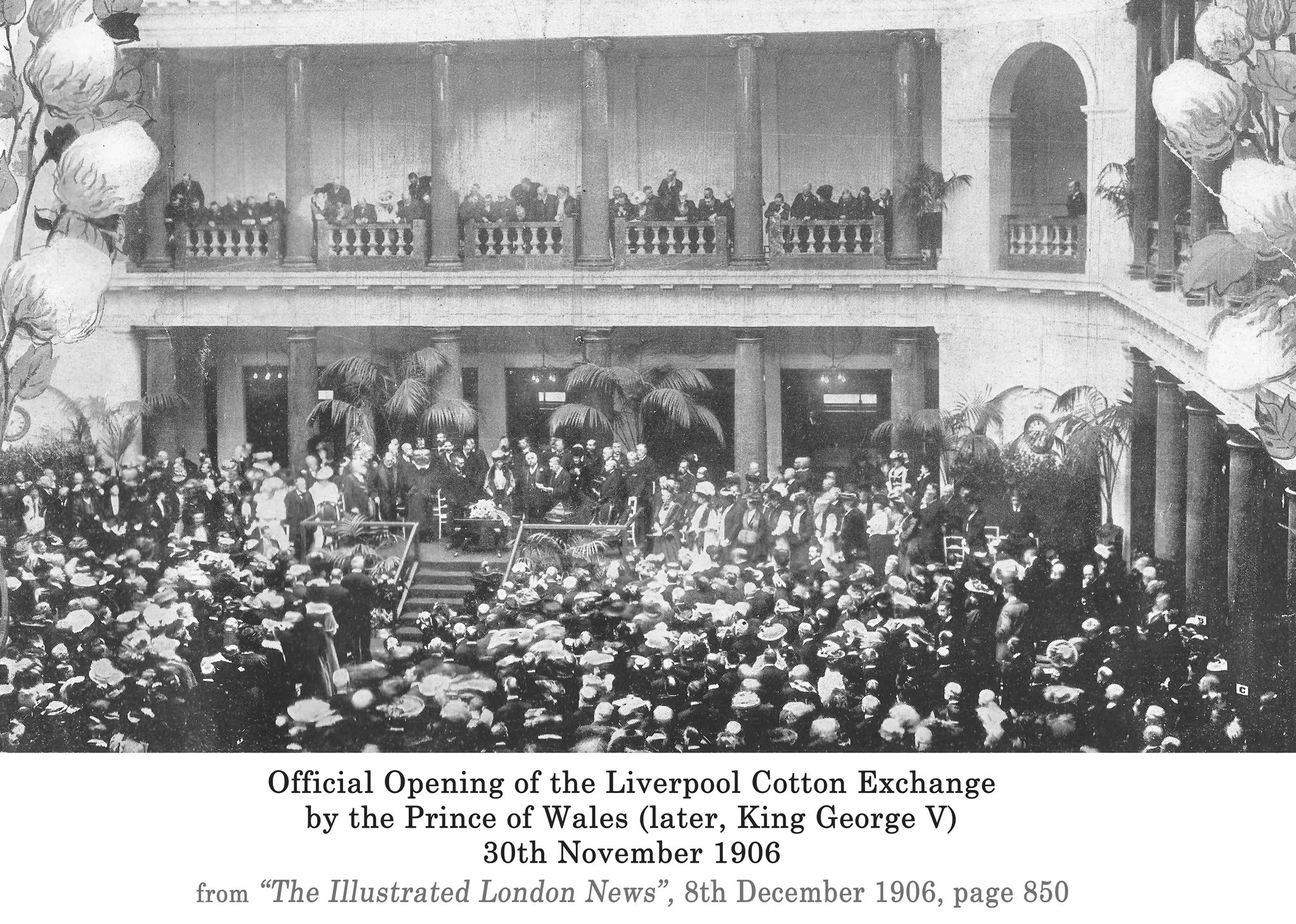
Official Opening of the Liverpool Cotton Exchange Building by the Prince of Wales (later, King George V) 30 November 1906 from "The Illustrated London News" 8 December 1906, page 850.

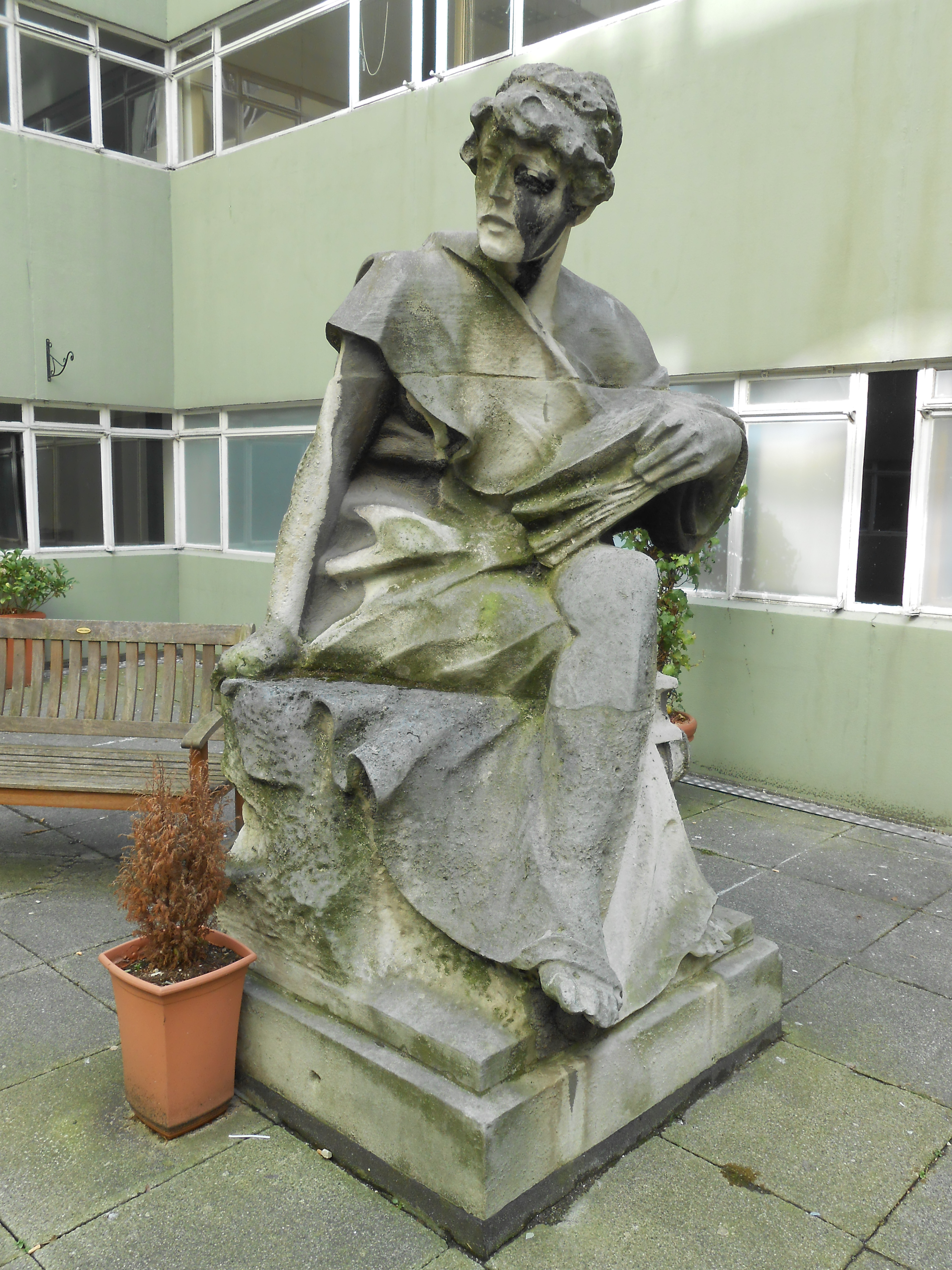
"Commerce" statue, Liverpool Cotton Exchange courtyard

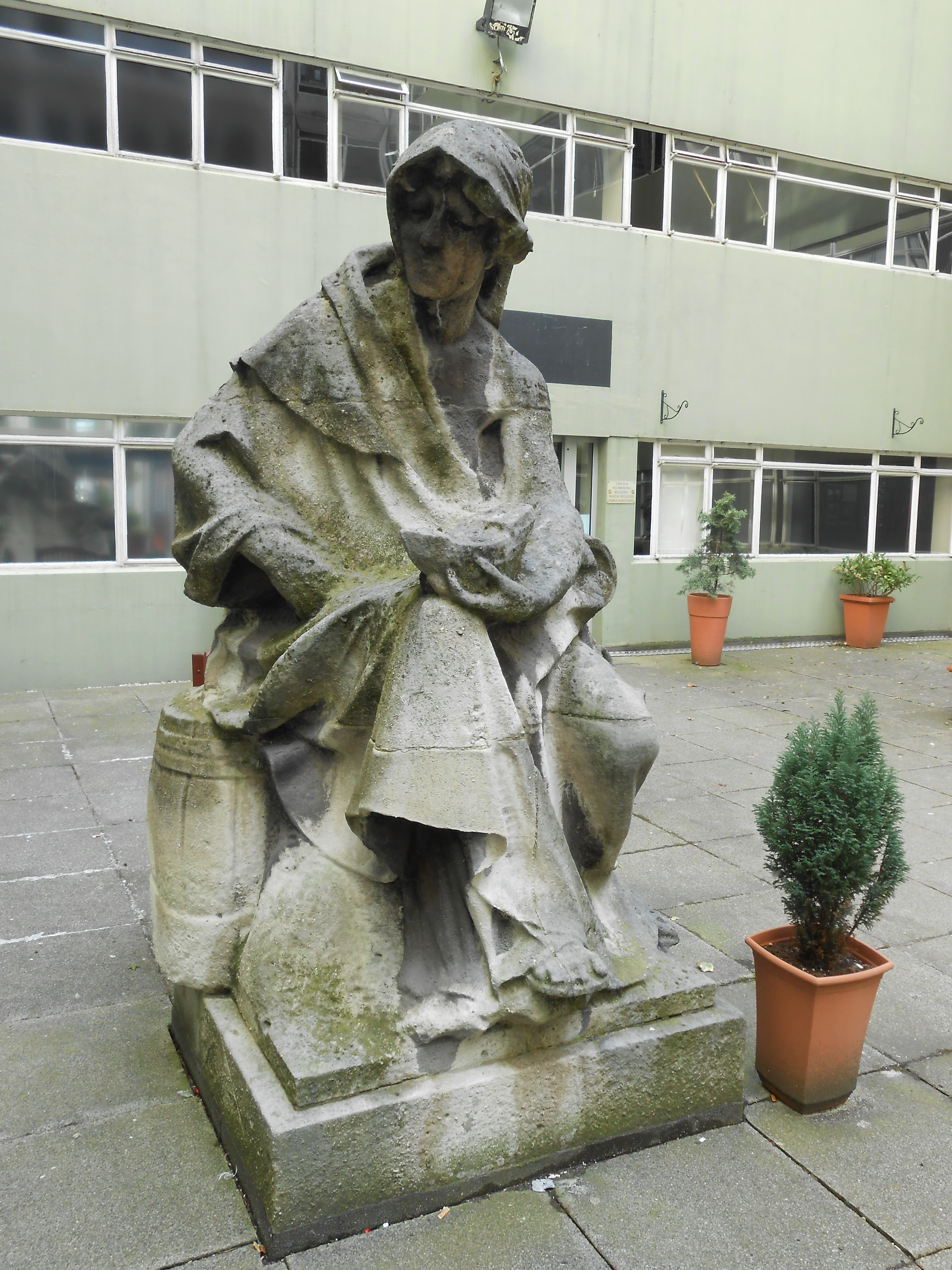
"Navigation" statue

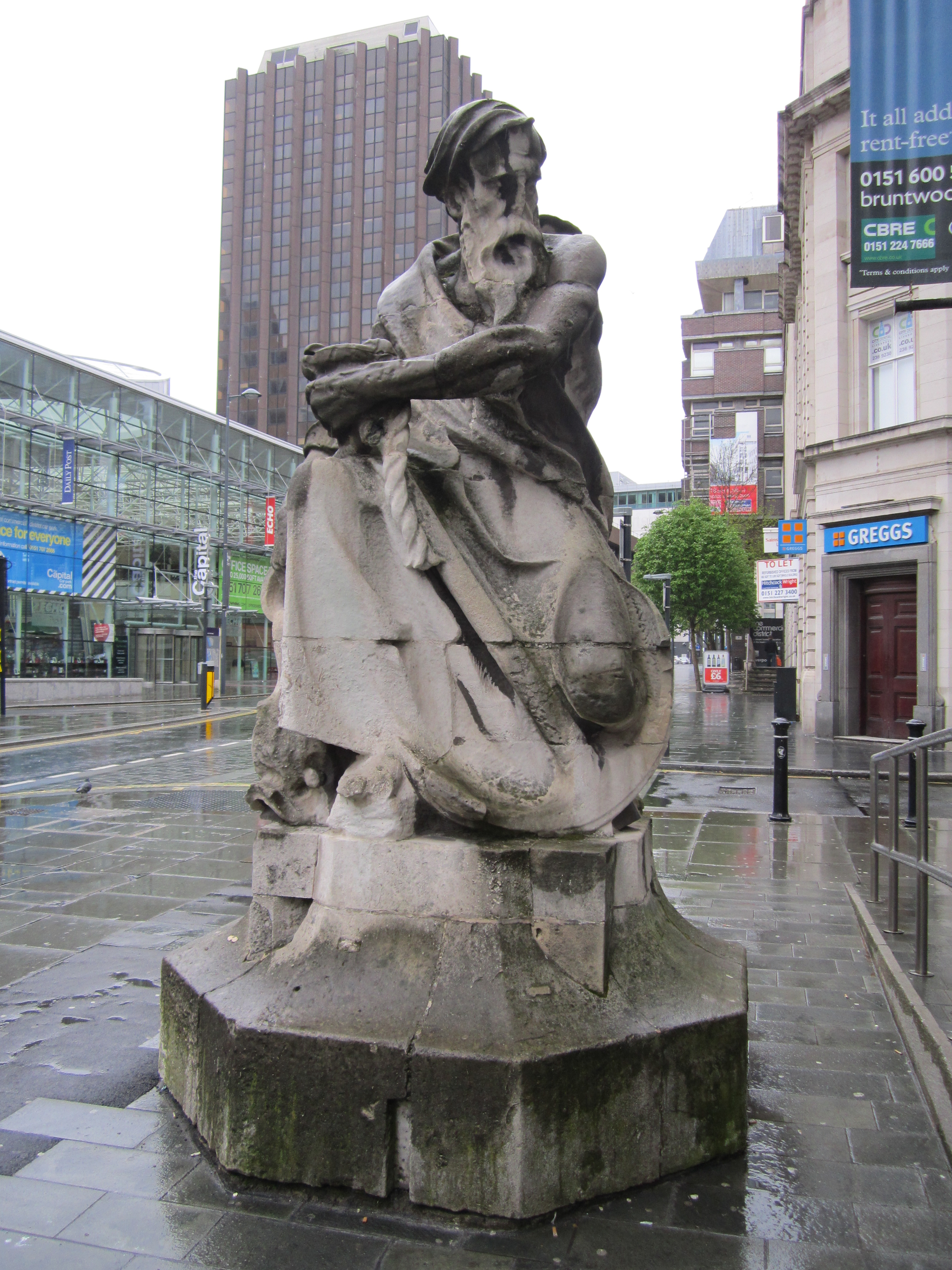
"The River Mersey" statue
