= Compton House, Liverpool =

Former department store building in Liverpool

Compton House
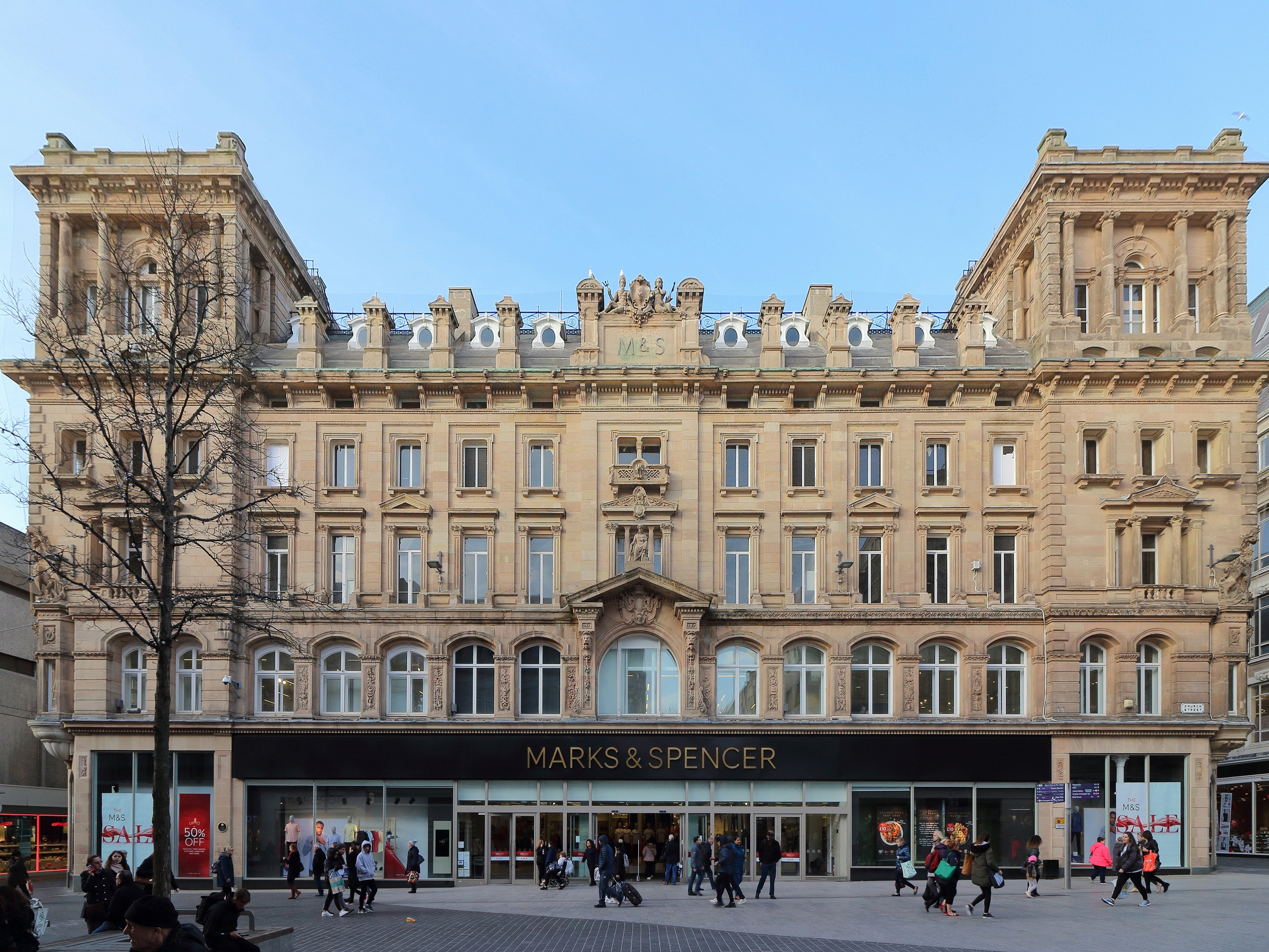
- Compton House, Church Street, Liverpool

General information
- Type: Commercial Store
- Location: Compton House, Church Street, Liverpool, United Kingdom
- Coordinates: 53.405357°N 2.983614°W
- Current tenants: Frasers Group
- Construction started: 1865
- Completed: 1867
- Owner: Liverpool City Council

Technical details
- Floor count: 4

Design and construction
- Main contractor: Thomas Haigh & Company

Compton House is a grade II listed department store building located on Church Street in Liverpool, England. The building is noted as being one of the first purpose built department stores in Europe. As of today, it forms part of Liverpool's biggest retail areas centred around Church Street.

Rebuilt in 1867, after a fire destroyed the original building two year previously, Compton House was at the time the world's biggest store with 5 floors. After the store's closure in 1871, the building was converted into a hotel and renamed Compton Hotel. At its height, the hotel was described as the finest and most central hotel in the city, catering mainly for American guests. A decline of Liverpool's economy in the early 20th century led to the hotel closing in 1927, Retailer Marks & Spencer subsequently moved into Compton House in 1928 becoming their flagship store in the city.

== History ==
Today's Compton House stands on the site of a former building by the same name, having been destroyed by a fire in 1865. The original Compton House was owned by Plymouth born brothers William and James Reddecliffe Jeffrey who set up their company Jeffery & Co in 1832. The premises contained within a clothiers, cabinet makers and Liverpool's largest drapers, with around 180 staff living in the upper floors.

On the night of Friday 8 December 1865 at 10am, two police officers walking their beat discovered smoke coming from the basement of the nearby Compton House cellar of Basnett Street. Local residents and staff in the building were quickly evacuated as a team of firefighters with a newly purchased steam-powered fire engine began to tackle the fire. News spread quickly about the fire with engines being called in from the West of England Fire Brigade as well as 40 men from the nearby HMS Donegal offering assistance. The building's floors gave way around midnight with blacken walls all that remained.

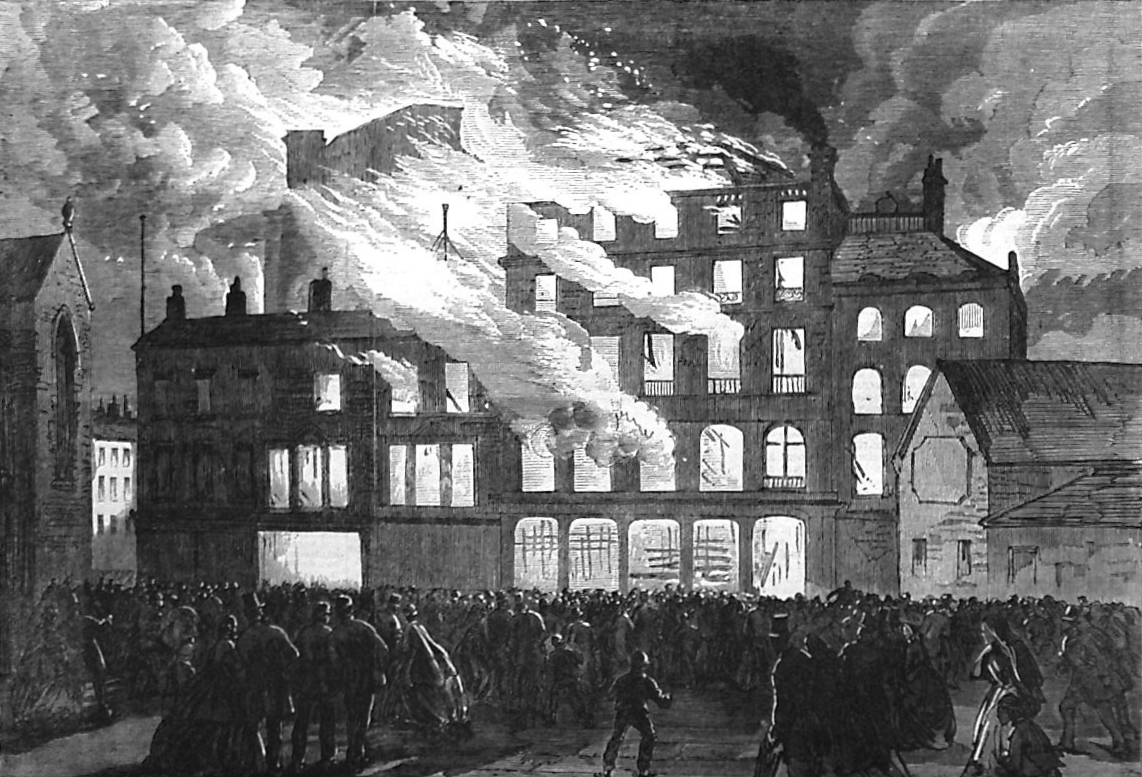
Destruction of Compton House 1865

Although originally thought to have been an accident an investigation and later hearing at Liverpool assizes found that the fire was purposely started by 20 year old Thomas Henry Sweeting, an apprentice to Messrs Jeffery after accusation of stealing 6 months previously. A confession by Sweeting detailed how he had started the fire by throwing a lit match amongst goods in the building's cellar.

In the aftermath of the fire, the business was assessed for damages with a loss of £200,000 for stock plus £100,000 for the building. A further 1,200 jobs were also lost. Owing to much of the company's stock being insured James Reddecliffe Jeffery went ahead and bought Woolton Hall and made plans for Compton House to be rebuilt. A design for the new building was completed within just two weeks by architecture firm Thomas Haigh and Company. Construction of the building was fast and the business re-opened just 18 months later in 1867. After some time William Jeffery developed Apoplexy leaving his brother to run the store alone. Eventually the cost of running the store outran the income and in March 1871 the store closed.

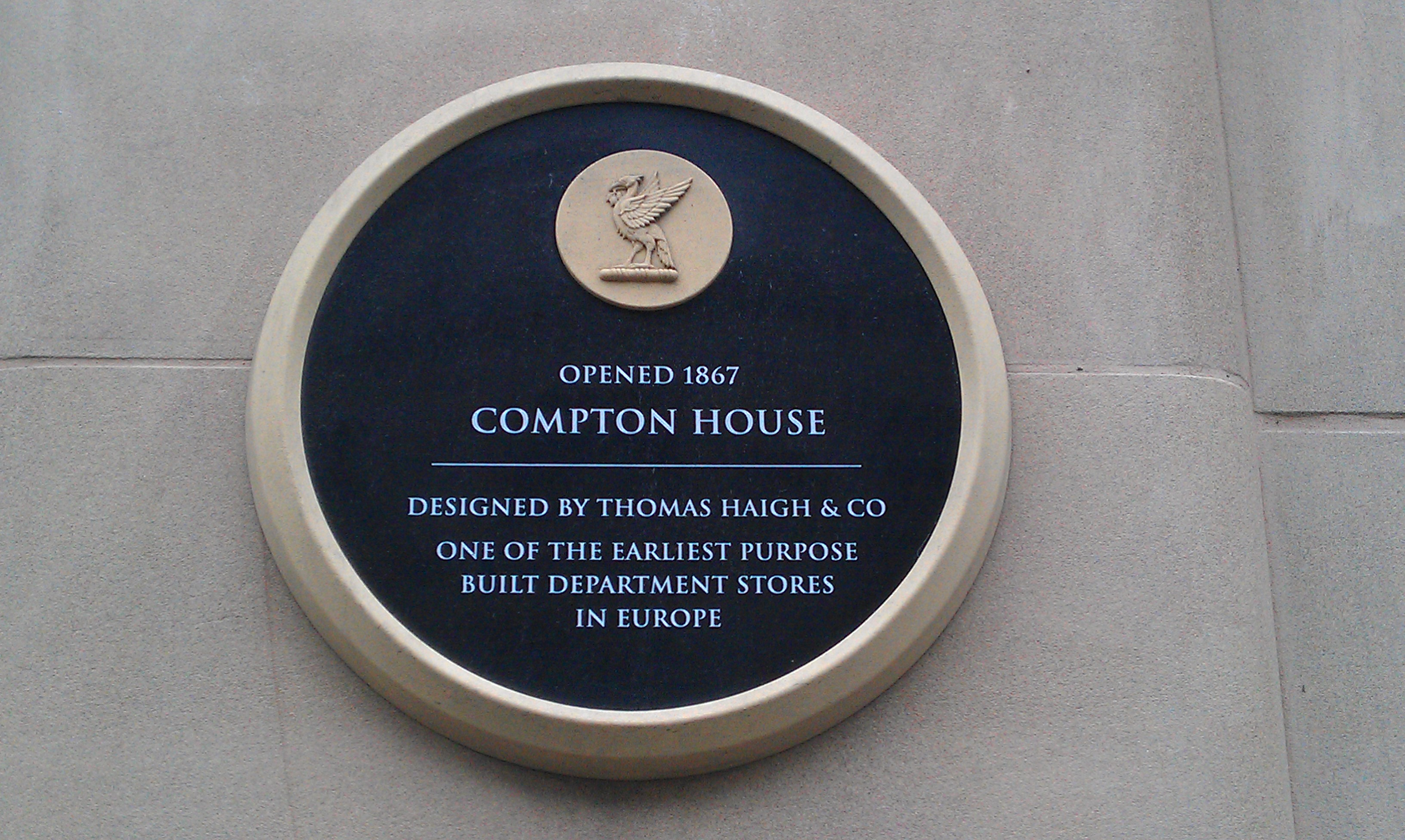
Compton House - Plaque

In 1873, two years after being abandoned, Compton House reopened as Compton Hotel under the management of William Russell. Although a hotel, the ground floor featured a number of different shops including a hatters, a hosiery and a drapers. The Left corner of Crompton House was home to Saxone Shoes that were tenants until July 1997, when the company that owned Saxone Shoes, British Shoe Corporation, closed the shop. The hotel itself consisted of 250 rooms with numerous more including a saloon, coffee room, billiard room, reading room, writing room, smoking room, dining room as well as adjoining ladies and gentlemen's drawing rooms. A main focus of the hotel was in accommodating for American guests arriving via Trans-Atlantic steamers at Liverpool's landing stage. This appeal to Americans is reflected by the inclusion of symbolic eagles within the building's architecture. In 1927, as Liverpool's economy began to decline the hotel closed and was replaced two years later by retailer Marks & Spencers' who occupied the building until 2023. In January 2024, it was announced that Frasers Group had purchased the lease.

== See also ==
- Grade I listed buildings in Liverpool
- Architecture of Liverpool
