= William Hutchinson (privateer) =

William Hutchinson

William Hutchinson (c. 1715 probably in Newcastle upon Tyne, England – 11 February 1801 in Liverpool, England) was an English mariner, privateer, author, and inventor who developed parabolic reflectors for lighthouses and helped establish possibly the world's first lifeboat station.

Hutchinson was a seaman by the late 1730s, serving on an East Indiaman trading in India and China. After service in the Royal Navy, he entered the employ of merchant and privateer Fortunatus Wright. Hutchinson was captured by the French in 1746 in the Perl, but by 1748 was master of the St. George, which captured a French ship. A voyage in 1750 as captain of Wright's Lowestoft ended in shipwreck, and Hutchinson later claimed that only a timely rescue saved him from being eaten by the survivors in his lifeboat, as he had drawn the short straw. After time ashore in Liverpool, he later returned to privateering, captaining the 22-gun frigate Liverpool (1757–8).

In 1759, Hutchinson was appointed dockmaster at Liverpool, and he held this and other positions at the harbour until 1793. In 1764 he started keeping detailed tide and weather records, and his data - the earliest continuous set of tidal records in the United Kingdom - contributed to the production of Holden's Tide Tables, which continued in use until the 1970s. In 1777 he first published A Treatise on Practical Seamanship..., which went through a number of editions and by 1794 was titled A Treatise on Naval Architecture...; it contained Hutchinson's advice and ideas on seamanship, ship design, and other maritime subjects, as well as autobiographical material.

Around 1763 Hutchinson installed what may have been the first parabolic reflector in a lighthouse in the new Leasowe Lighthouse, and later at a lighthouse in Hoylake. He also experimented with oil-burning lights for lighthouses, invented a new rudder and a better quick-priming mechanism for large guns, and worked with Dr. Thomas Houlston on better methods of artificial respiration for drowning victims. He helped establish possibly the world's first lifeboat station, at Formby.

In 1789 Hutchinson helped found the Liverpool Marine Society for indigent seamen, widows of seamen, and their families; he contributed 100 guineas.
