= Liverpool Cotton Exchange Building =

Building in Liverpool, England

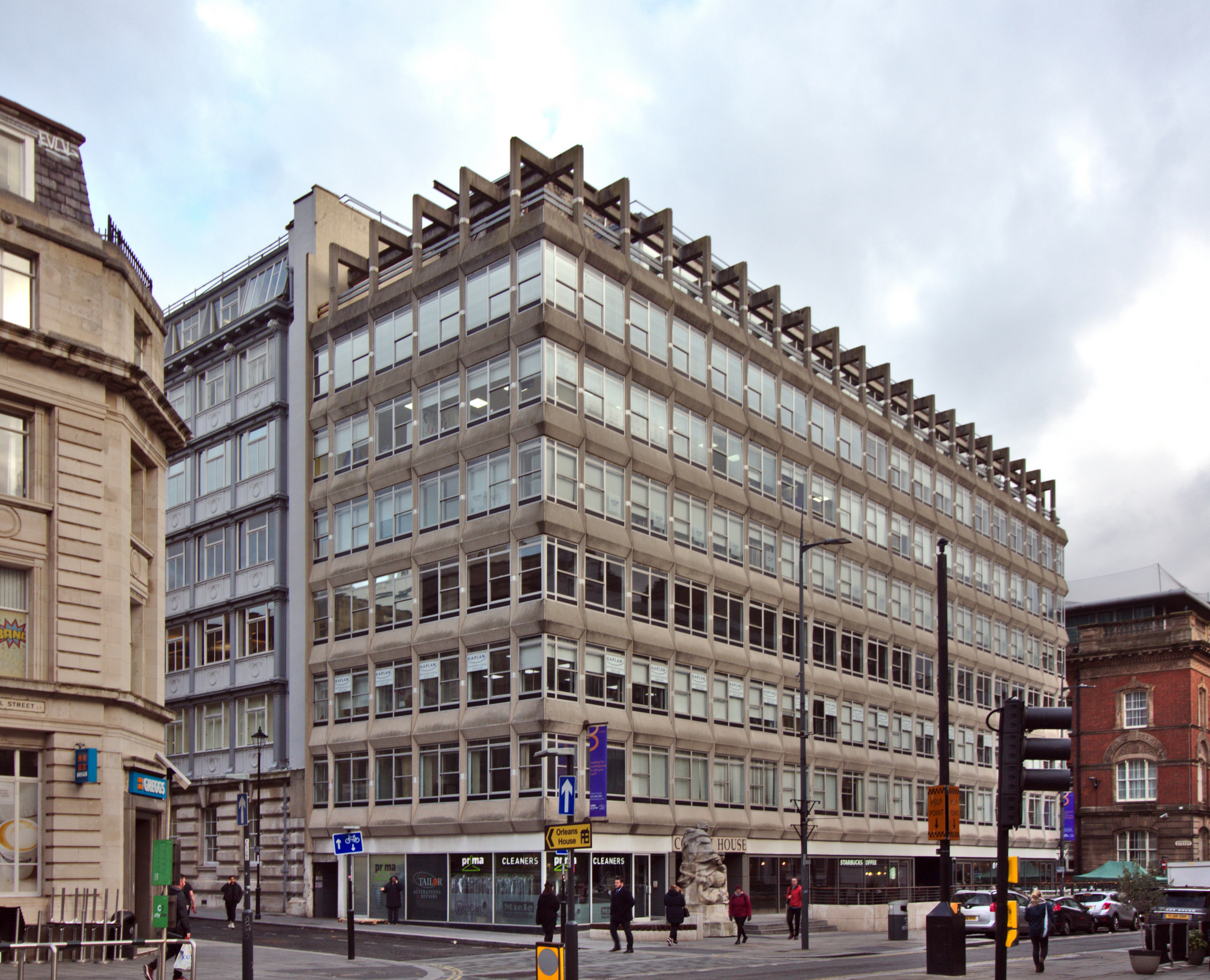
- Liverpool Cotton Exchange Building, Old Hall Street front

- Location in Liverpool
- 53.4090°N 2.9935°W
- Location: Old Hall Street, Liverpool, Merseyside, England
- OS grid reference: SJ 341 908

History
- Built: 1905–06
- Built for: Liverpool Cotton Exchange

Site notes
- Architect(s): Matear and Simon, Newton-Dawson, Forbes and Tate
- Restored: 1967–69

Listed Building – Grade II
- Designated: 14 March 1975
- Reference no.: 1363092

Liverpool Cotton Exchange Building is an office block in Old Hall Street, Liverpool, Merseyside, England. The commercial building, which originally had a Neoclassical façade, replaced the 19th-century cotton exchange in Exchange Flags in 1906. Between 1967 and 1969 the building's exterior was given a contemporary mid 20th century design.

The building is used mainly for offices; retail facilities operate at street level.

== History ==
The business of the cotton exchange was originally conducted outdoors on Exchange Flags, behind Liverpool Town Hall. The first Cotton Exchange Building was built in 1808 adjacent to the flags. The present building in Old Hall Street was designed by Matear and Simon (Old Liverpool Cotton Exchange Building in Old Hall Street (built 1905; largely demolished 1967–69)), built by the Waring-White Building Company, and was officially opened by the Prince and Princess of Wales on 30 November 1906. The building cost around £300,000 build and the opening took place in the company of 3,000 guests. Its façade was in Neoclassical style, with Baroque towers at the angles. Its exterior decoration included statues. Inside the building was the latest technology for communicating with cotton trading elsewhere in the world, including telephones, and cables linking directly with New York, Bremen and Bombay. The Old Hall Street front was replaced with a modern-style façade designed by Newton-Dawson, Forbes and Tate in 1967–69, and the former main exchange hall was replaced by a courtyard. In addition to offices, the building also incorporates retail facilities.

The building was home to Liverpool's registrar's office and coroner's courts up until January 2012. Up to 100,000 people a year used to visit the offices to register births, deaths and marriages before the facility was moved to St George's Hall.

The suffragette, Edith Rigby, planted a bomb in the building on 5 July 1913, and although it was later stated in court that ‘no great damage had been done by the explosion’, Mrs Rigby was found guilty and sentenced to nine months' imprisonment with hard labour.

== Architecture ==
The building is in seven storeys, and the modern front on Old Hall Street, facing southwest, has 21 bays. The sides and back of the building are largely unaltered from the original design. There are two levels of basements which originally contained the building's coal bunkers, restaurant and ballrooms. The façade on Edmund Street, facing northwest, has retained cast iron panels decorated with wreaths, made by Macfarlane's of Glasgow. The back of the building, on Bixteth Street, is faced with Portland stone, and the Ormond Street front is in brick. Inside the building the colonnade formerly surrounding the trading floor is still present. The columns are monoliths of larvikite, quarried in Norway and polished in Aberdeen. The building is recorded in the National Heritage List for England as a designated Grade II listed building. Some of the statues formerly on the façade are now located nearby; these include personifications of Navigation and Commerce.

== See also ==
Architecture of Liverpool
