= New Hall Place =

Building in Liverpool, England

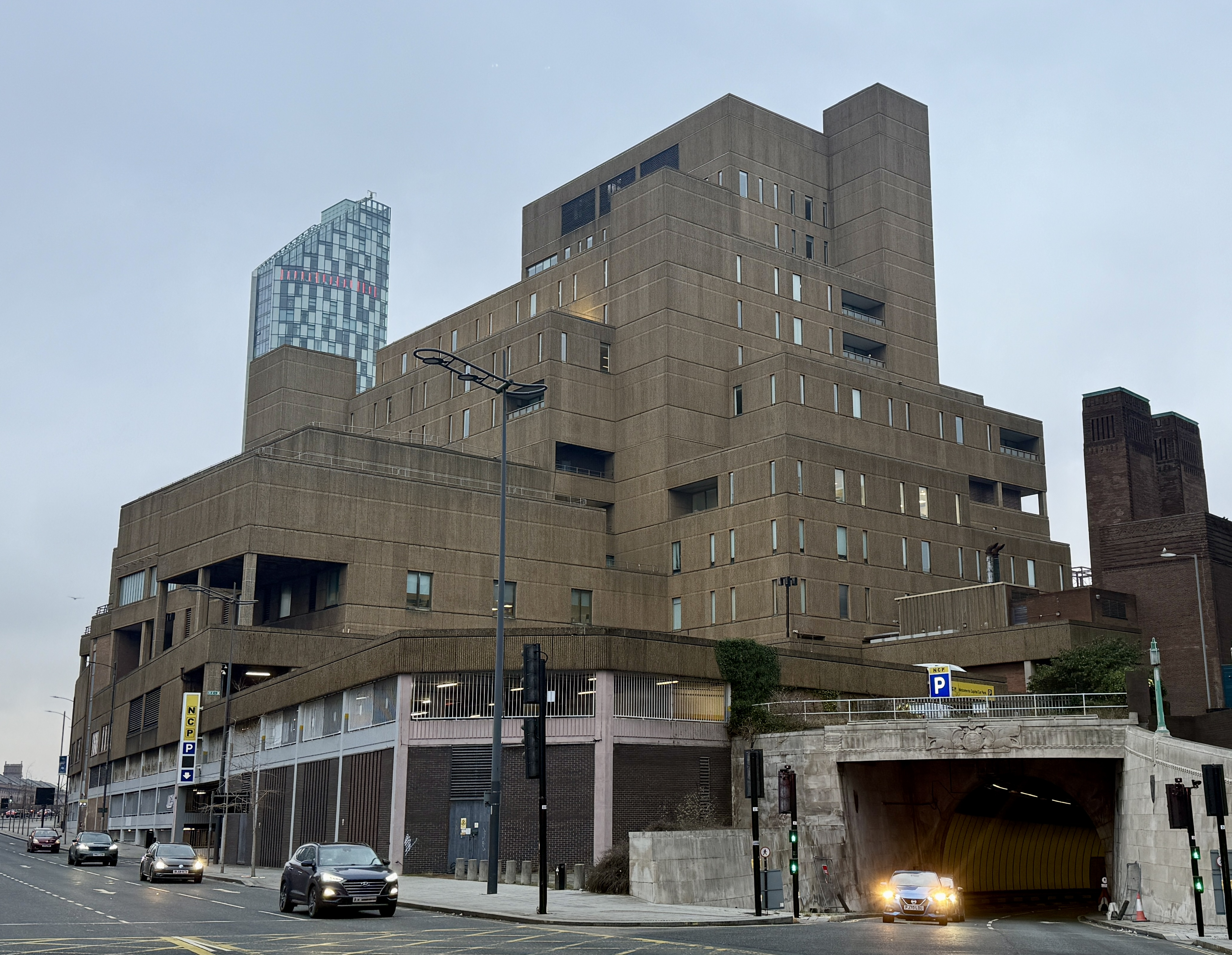
- Interactive map of New Hall Place

General information
- Type: Office
- Location: Old Hall Street, Liverpool, England, United Kingdom
- Coordinates: 53.40862°N 2.99571°W
- Completed: 1974

Height
- Roof: 73 metres (240 ft)

Technical details
- Floor count: 13

New Hall Place (also known as The Capital and the Royal & SunAlliance Building) is a 13-storey brutalist style office complex in the commercial district of Liverpool, England. Due to its rough, beige exterior and proximity to the waterfront, it is also known by the local nickname 'The Sandcastle'.

== History ==
It was developed by Royal Insurance as their head office building. As well as office space the building comprised a staff car park in the underground floors, a garage for the company chauffeur driven cars and staff facilities on the first floor including staff restaurant, sports hall, gymnasium and subsidised bar.

Following the 1990s merger of Royal Insurance with SunAlliance to form Royal & SunAlliance (RSA), numerous job losses followed largely through outsourcing and off shoring deals. RSA staff numbers based in the building reduced from over 3000 to around 1200. In 2006 RSA sold the building to George Downing and leased back the parts of the building still used by RSA. This allowed other tenants to move in such as the UK Border Agency. Downing renamed the building from New Hall Place to The Capital.

From 2016 The Capital is now owned by an American company Trinistar. New management took over in early 2016 from Lambert Smith Hampton To MJ MAPP LTD.

== Design ==
The design of New Hall Place is described as a brutalist response to the nearby Royal Liver Building in terms of massing and height. New Hall Place is situated on Old Hall Street (one of Liverpool's main commercial and financial areas) and the lower three floors serve as the Capital Car Park — a 1,100 capacity secure guarded car park. One of two Liverpool exits from the Queensway Tunnel is located directly beneath New Hall Place (the other is next to the World Museum Liverpool).

The building was connected by footbridges as part of the Liverpool skyway project in the 1970s. New Hall Place had a direct connection to Ralli House opposite, as well a skyway ramp in Union Street, and then on to Empire Bridge. The Old Hall Street bridge was removed in year 2000, though some of the footbridges on the other side of the building still exist, but are closed to the public.

== Use of river water to heat and cool the building ==
The building was constructed simultaneously with the Liverpool Daily Post and Echo building. Both buildings operated heat pumps to heat and cool the building using water from the adjacent River Mersey. Three thousand gallons of water per hour seeps into the Mersey railway tunnel from the river above, via the riverbed rock, which is a steady 13C temperature all year. This water was previously pumped out into the dock system. The heat pumps used this constant temperature water to heat the building, or as a heat sink to cool the building.

== Gallery ==
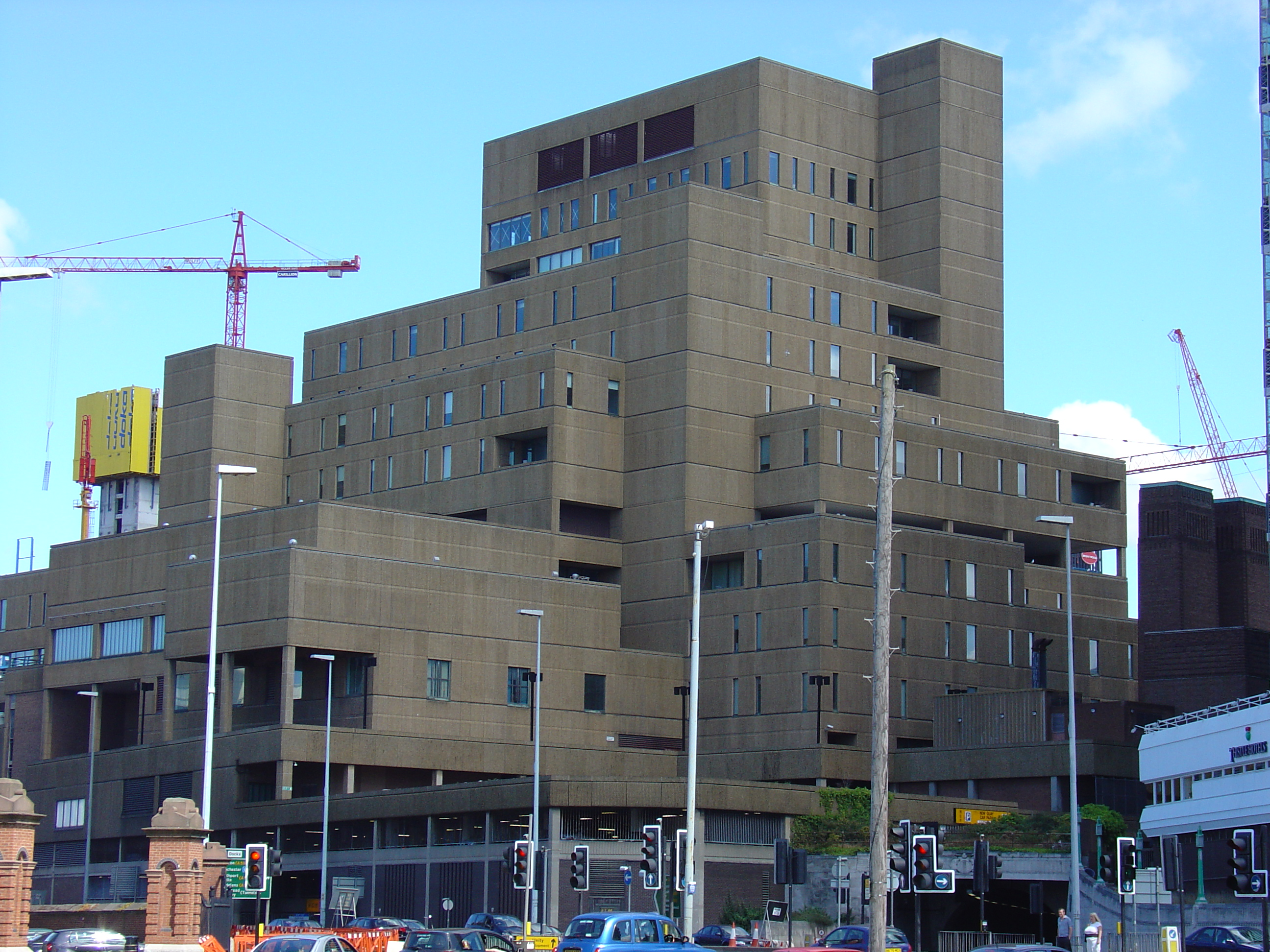

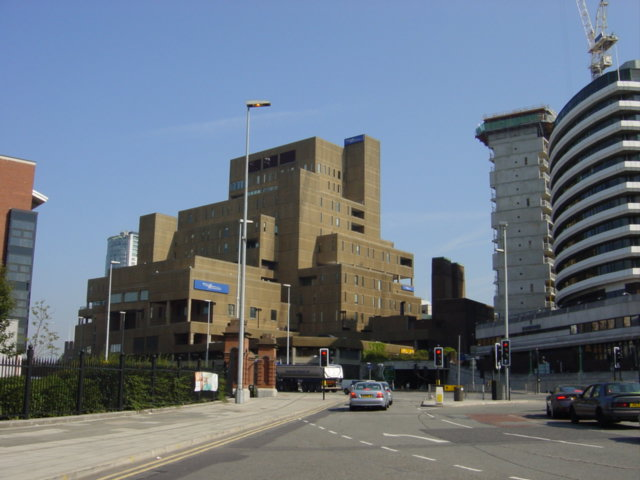

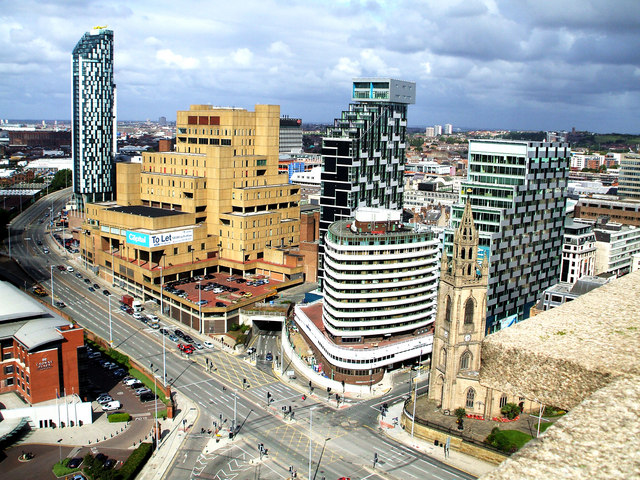
