= Liverpool (privateer) =

British private vessel

The Liverpool was a British privateer that operated during the Seven Years' War. She made four cruises from June 1757 to March 1759, and took more than a dozen prizes in an 18 month career. She was described as ‘one of the finest privateers belonging to the period’.

== Description ==
Liverpool was a ship-rigged merchant ship from the city of Liverpool which was outfitted as a privateer in the spring of 1757, after the outbreak of war between the Britain and France. she was outfitted by a Mr. Hardwar and was captained by William Hutchinson, an associate of Mersey privateer Fortunatus Wright. Liverpool was outfitted with 22 guns, 18 of them 12-pounders. She was described as 'the ship Liverpool, of 250 tons burthen, a remarkably fast vessel'.

== Career ==
Liverpool's first cruise began on 10 June 1757, and ranged across the South-Western Approaches and the coast of France. It continued until 24 November 1757, during which time she took ten prizes, including the Grand Marquis de Tournay, valued at £20,000 (equivalent to £3,388,075 in 2023).

Her second cruise, from January to August 1758, ranged along the coast of France and into the Mediterranean, during which she took another seven prizes.

The third cruise, under Capt. John Ward, Hutchinson's lieutenant and a relative, was planned for September 1758 but failed when many of her crew absented themselves before departure.

The fourth cruise began on 15 October with a new crew, and once more under the command of Capt. Hutchinson. This time was less successful, and after taking some Dutch vessels off the coast of Ireland she returned to port on 1 March 1759, though still equipped for further operations.

== Fate ==
On 12 April 1759 Liverpool was sold at auction at the Merchants Coffee-house.
