= William Fawcett (engineer) =

19th-century British engineer, manufacturer

- Born: 26 December 1763; Liverpool, England
- Died: 28 December 1844 (aged 81); Liverpool, England
- Engineering career
- Discipline: Engineer, arms manufacturer
- Practice name: Fawcett, Preston and Company
- Projects: Device for producing sugar from cane juice using the steam from a steam engine's boiler
- Significant design: Marine steam engine

William Fawcett (26 December 1763 – 28 December 1844) was an engineer and manufacturer of guns and steam engines, supplying steam engines for some of the earliest steam ships in Britain and America, and for use on sugar plantations in America. He was a partner in the firm of Fawcett, Preston and Company, which supplied the steam engines for a number of ships, including the paddle steamer William Fawcett, described as the first ship operated by what would become the Peninsular and Oriental Steam Navigation Company (P&O).

== Early career ==
William Fawcett was born 26 December 1763 in Liverpool, England, into a Quaker family. He married a daughter of Joseph Rathbone, son of William Rathbone II and Mary Darby, sister of Abraham Darby II. Fawcett was an apprentice engineer at the Phoenix Foundry in Liverpool, which was owned by the Darbys of Coalbrookdale and managed by his father-in-law. Fawcett completed his apprenticeship in 1784, and Joseph Rathbone took him into the management of the foundry. When Rathbone died in 1790, he left £2,500 and five shares in the Iron Bridge on the River Severn to Fawcett. Fawcett leased the Phoenix Foundry (for a seven year term) in 1790, and bought it from the Darbys in 1794 for £2,300, naming the firm Fawcett and Company.

After buying the Phoenix Foundry and organizing Fawcett and Company in 1794, Fawcett began producing armaments, in particular, naval guns. The production of arms helped the firm prosper during the Napoleonic Wars, but Fawcett's fellow Quakers denounced him for his production of weapons of war and he left the faith.

Fawcett went bankrupt in 1810, and sold the foundry to George and Henry Littledale in 1813. Fawcett stayed on as manager, with the firm renamed Fawcett, Littledales, and Company. Fawcett bought back part of the firm by the early 1820s, and in 1823 the Littledales sold their majority interest in the firm to the Preston family. The firm then became Fawcett, Preston and Company.

== Steam engines ==
Fawcett and Company began manufacturing steam engines in 1800. Fawcett, Littledales produced its first marine steam engine in 1817, which was installed in the Mersey ferry Etna. The firm exported stationary steam engines to sugar plantations in Louisiana in the early 1820s. In 1827, William Fawcett received a patent, together with Matthew Clark, for a device for producing sugar from cane juice using the steam from a steam engine's boiler.

Fawcett, Preston exported marine steam engines to Canada and the United States. They supplied the engines for the Conde de Palmella, the first ocean-going steamer to leave Britain (traveling from London to Lisbon), for the Royal William, the first steam ship to travel from Liverpool to New York primarily under steam, and for the President, the largest steam ship at the time of her construction.

Two paddle steamers were named for Fawcett. In 1828, Fawcett, in partnership with Joseph Robinson Pim, commissioned the construction of a paddle steamer named William Fawcett. The Fawcett, Preston firm provided the steam engine for the ship. The ship is often named as the first ship used by the Peninsular Steam Navigation Company, which later became the P&O.

In 1829, a smaller paddle-wheel steamer, also named William Fawcett, was built and provided with an engine from Fawcett, Preston. That ship served as a ferry between Birkenhead and Liverpool for 20 years.

William Fawcett died in Liverpool on 28 December 1844, age 83. The Fawcett name remained on the firm and its successors through the 19th and 20th centuries.
