= William Fawcett (paddle steamer) =

Steam ship, earliest ship used by the P&O

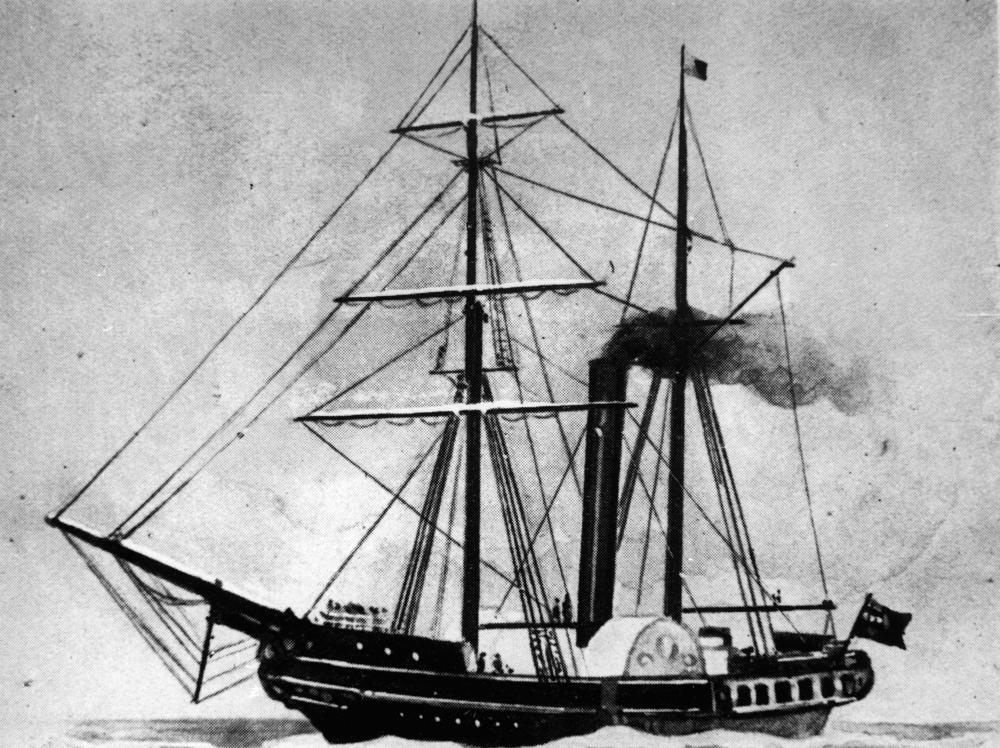
- William Fawcett (1828)

History
- Owner: Dublin and London Steam Packet Company
- Port of registry: United Kingdom
- Route: London and Dublin packet service
- Builder: Caleb & James Smith, Liverpool
- Maiden voyage: 1828
- Out of service: by April 1845
- Fate: Broken up

General characteristics
- Tonnage: 206 GRT
- Length: 44.42 m (145.7 ft)
- Beam: 6.76 m (22.2 ft)
- Depth: 4.53 m (14.9 ft)
- Installed power: steam, 130 hp
- Propulsion: paddles

William Fawcett was the name given to two paddle steamers that operated in British waters from the late 1820s to the mid-1840s. The first ship, constructed in 1828, is widely regarded as the inaugural vessel in the service of what eventually evolved into the Peninsular and Oriental Steam Navigation Company (P&O).

== 1828 ship ==
In 1828, William Fawcett of Liverpool and Joseph Robinson Pim of Dublin commissioned the construction of a paddle steamer named William Fawcett. The ship was built by Caleb and James Smith at the Queen's Dock, Port of Liverpool. Initially, the vessel measured 130 feet (40 m) in length and had a cargo capacity of 185 tons. However, in 1835, its length was recorded as 44.42 meters (145.7 ft), with a gross register tonnage of 206. The steam engines, rated at 130 horsepower, were provided by the firm of Fawcett, Preston, and Company, of which William Fawcett was a co-owner and manager. The ship operated in the packet trade, serving the routes between London, Cork and Dublin. In 1832, the vessel was sold to Richard Bourne and his associates for service with the Dublin and London Steam Packet Company.

In 1835, Bourne partnered with Brodie McGhie Willcox and Arthur Anderson to charter the William Fawcett for five voyages between London and the Iberian Peninsula. This service marks the inception of the Peninsular Steam Navigation Company, which eventually became P&O. In 1835, the William Fawcett made its initial four voyages for the Peninsular company, all of which turned around at Lisbon. The fifth trip reached Gibraltar. In 1837 and again in early 1838, the ship was chartered by the Peninsular company for a trip from London to northern Spain and return. The ship was refitted later in 1838, and afterwards chartered by the Peninsular company for two trips between London and Madeira. The William Fawcett had been broken up by April 1845.

== 1829 ship ==
The second William Fawcett was a paddle steamer built in 1829 in Liverpool by Mottershead and Hayes. It was 74.3 feet (22.6 m) long, with a capacity of 48 tons. It had a 26 (or 30) horsepower engine supplied by Fawcett, Preston and Company. The ship worked as a ferry between Liverpool and Birkenhead for at least twenty years.
