= Salthouse Dock =

Dock on the River Mersey in Liverpool, England

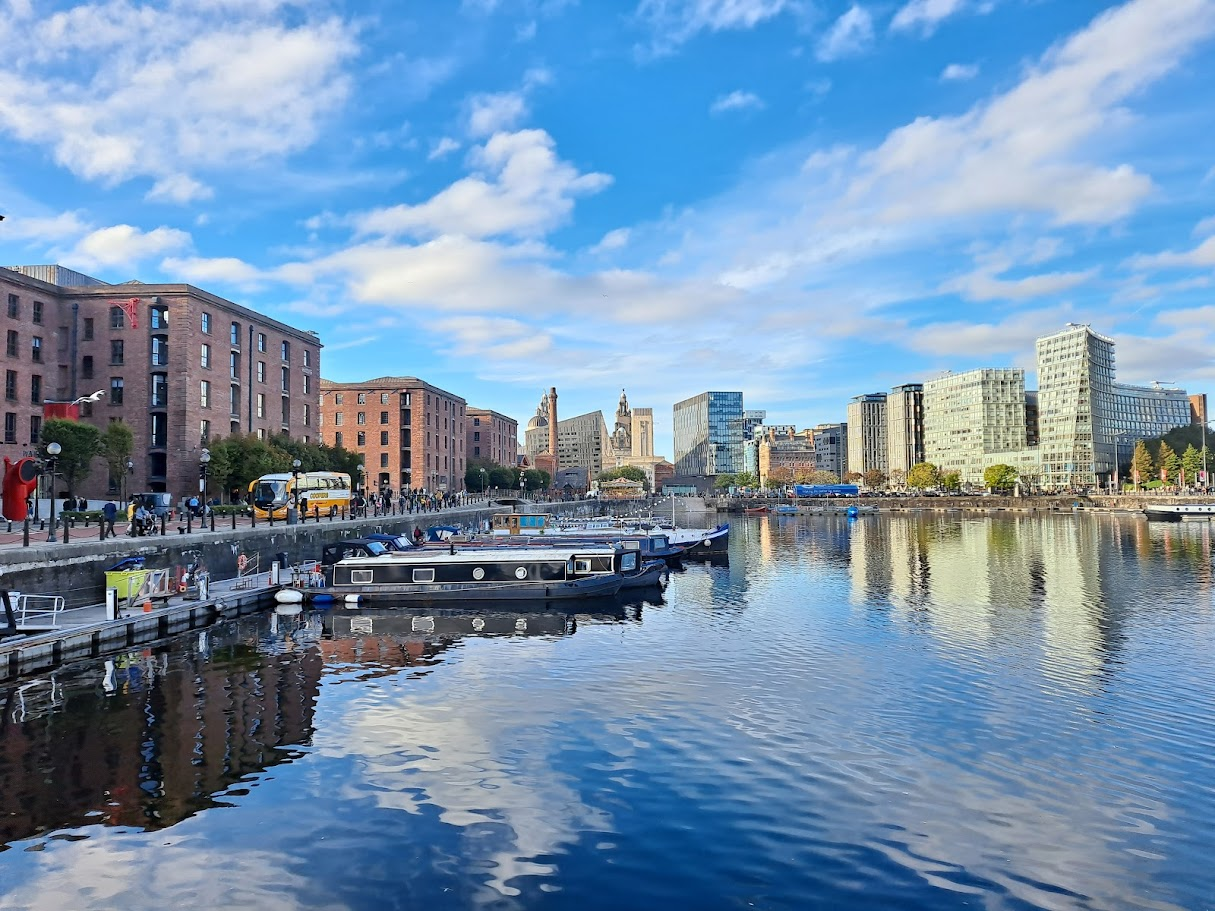
- The Salthouse Dock, with the Albert Dock warehouses and Liverpool's Pier Head in the distance

Location
- Location: Liverpool, United Kingdom
- Coordinates: 53.4006°N 2.9898°W
- OS grid: SJ342897

Details
- Owner: Canal & River Trust
- Opened: 1753
- Type: Wet dock
- Joins: Albert Dock; Canning Dock (former); Wapping Basin to Wapping Dock and Duke's Dock
- Area: 6 acres (2.4 ha), 2,019 sq yd (1,688 m^{2})
- Width at entrance: 45 ft (14 m)
- Quay length: 784 yd (717 m)

Salthouse Dock is a dock on the River Mersey, England, and part of the Port of Liverpool. It is situated in the southern dock system, connected to Canning Dock to the north, Wapping Dock via Wapping Basin to the south and Albert Dock to the west.

== History ==
Designed by Thomas Steers and being built from 1734, Salthouse Dock was completed after his death by Henry Berry, opening in 1753. The dock was originally known as South Dock, the name changing because it was nearby to John Blackburne's saltworks. As is indicative of its name, the dock was an important transit terminal for the salt industry. Liverpool was a base for the refining of rock salt from Cheshire and its onward transportation. The dock also handled agricultural produce from Ireland and the Mediterranean. Around 1769, John Okill had a shipyard on the south side.

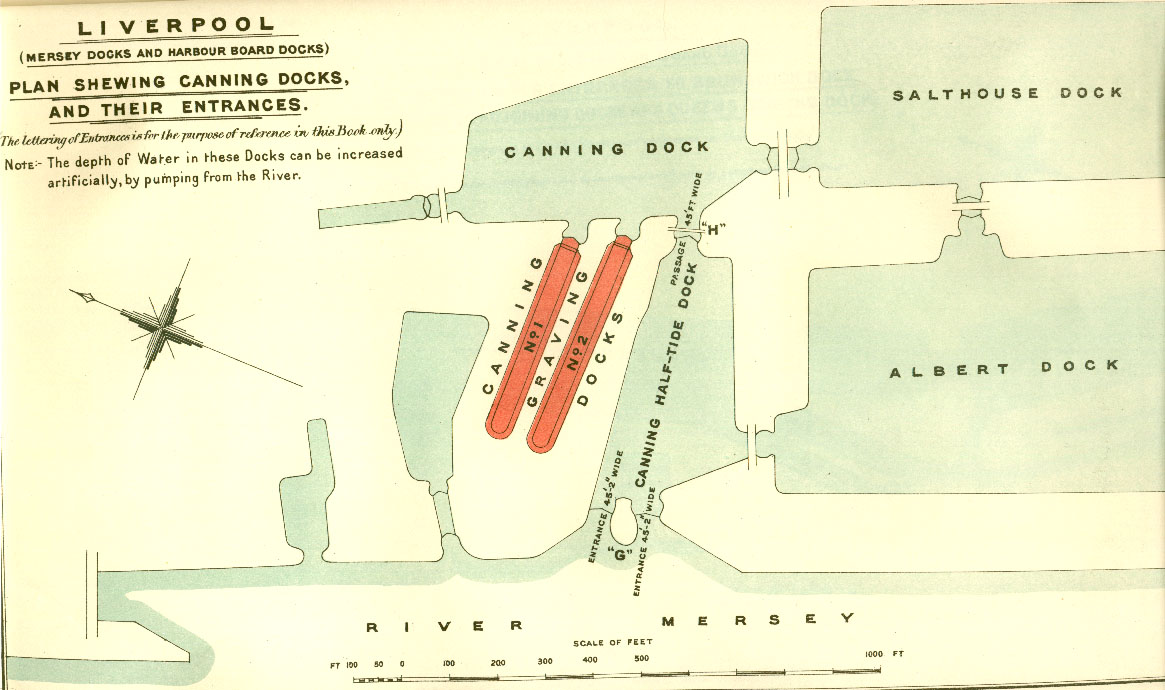
British Empire Dockyards and Ports, 1909

Structural improvements were made to the dock basin in 1842 and 1855. The opening of the Albert Dock in 1846 allowed vessels to be unloaded there, before moving on to the Salthouse Dock for loading. By the mid-19th century, the main trade from the dock was with China and the East Indies. The dock served square rigged sailing ships until about 1914.

Custom House railway station, on the Liverpool Overhead Railway, was opened at the north-east corner of the dock in 1893. The station, opened at the same time as the railway, was renamed Canning in 1947 and closed in 1956 along with the railway. By 1920, the Wapping and Salthouse Goods Depot of the Lancashire and Yorkshire Railway was on the eastern side of the dock.

A Royal Navy training ship, HMS Eagle, was based at Salthouse Dock from the end of the 19th century. This was originally a wooden vessel, which was renamed HMS Eaglet in 1918 and replaced in 1927. The following vessel survived until 1972. In 1934, the dock had warehousing along all four quays. The dock closed in 1972.

=== After closure ===
After the closure of Salthouse Dock, the dock silted up during the following decade and the quayside was in a state of considerable dereliction by 1980. At this point, transit sheds still remained on the east and west sides of the dock, with a former lifeboat training school also present at the north end of the western quay. In 1981, the Merseyside Development Corporation was established to rejuvenate the South Docks, and the dock was dredged between 1981-5. During the 1980s, direct access from Canning Dock was removed with the entrance being filled in, and a permanent roadway and slipway installed. Swing bridges, which were across the Albert Dock and Wapping Basin entrances, were also replaced with fixed structures.

By 2005, the dock had gained a significant marine biodiversity, including jellyfish, mussels, sponges and seaweed. Non-native marine wildlife found in the vicinity included giant snails, Korean sea squirts and Australasian barnacles.

Until 2013, Yellow Duckmarines were used in the dock as a tourist attraction. On 30 March and 15 June 2013, one of their four amphibious vehicles sank in the dock, which resulted in the withdrawal of licensing for the vehicles. In 2024, Splash Tours Liverpool opened, reintroducing amphibious tours to the dock.

== Present ==
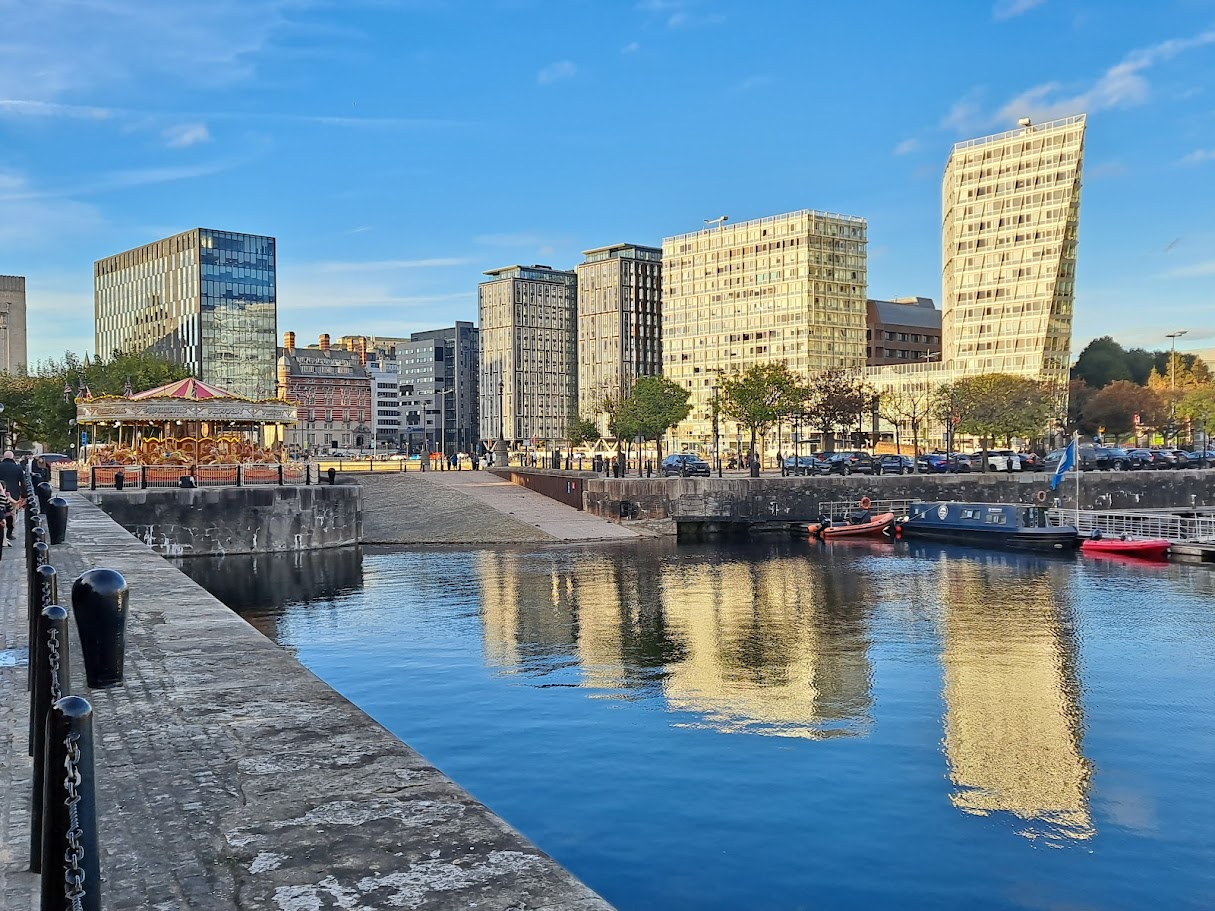
Salthouse Dock in 2023.

Salthouse Dock is the oldest existing dock in Liverpool, and some of the masonry in the south-west corner of the dock is from the original construction. The dock walls are Grade II listed. A granite stone gable and arch entrance survives at the south east corner of the dock, from a transit shed built by Jesse Hartley.

Following the completion of the Liverpool Canal Link in 2009, Salthouse Dock is on the route of the Leeds and Liverpool Canal extension to Liverpool Marina at Brunswick and Coburg Docks. The waterspace of this and the other docks in the southern system was owned by British Waterways from 2003 to 2012, now transferred to the Canal & River Trust. Salthouse Dock has pontoon moorings for small watercraft.
