= Duke's Dock =

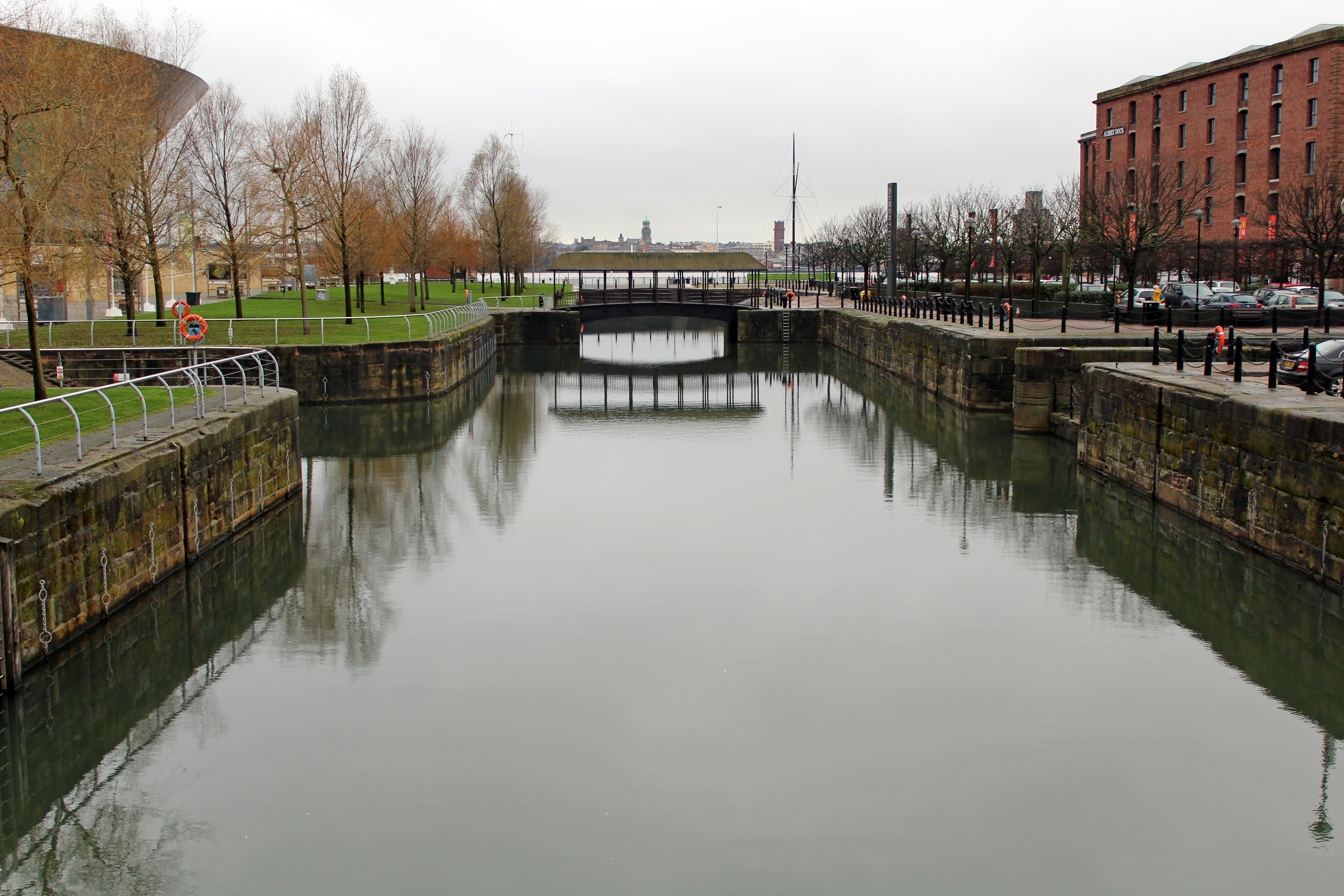
- Looking west along Duke's Dock

Location
- Location: Liverpool, United Kingdom
- Coordinates: 53.3988°N 2.9907°W
- OS grid: SJ342895

Details
- Owner: Canal & River Trust
- Opened: 1773
- Closed: 1972
- Type: Wet dock
- Joins: Salthouse Dock via Wapping Basin; Wapping Dock via Wapping Basin

Duke's Dock is a dock on the River Mersey, England, and part of the Port of Liverpool. It is in the southern dock system, connected to Salthouse Dock and Wapping Dock to the east. The Albert Dock is located immediately north, although not directly accessible by water.

== History ==
The land for the dock was obtained in 1768. Opening in 1773, Duke's Dock was built privately for the Duke of Bridgewater as a Liverpool-based facility for traffic using the Bridgewater Canal from Manchester. The dock was probably designed by James Brindley, who also built the Bridgewater Canal. The first dockside warehouse on the Mersey was built at the dock in 1783, and the dock was extended in the 1790s due to growth in the cotton industry. In 1811, a large six-storey warehouse was built on the southern side of the dock. Barges were able to enter the warehouse from the dock, and the building lasted until the 1960s. In 1845, a small half-tide dock was constructed between Duke's Dock and the river and, at the opposite end of the dock, Wapping Basin was added in 1855. The dock was purchased by the MD&HB in 1900, and the warehouses remained until 1960. The dock had a southern branch which was filled in 1967, and warehouses were removed from the north and south quaysides. The dock closed in 1972.

=== After closure ===
After the closure of Duke's Dock, the dock silted up during the following decade and the quayside was in a state of considerable dereliction by 1980. In 1980, disused buildings including one of the Liverpool Lighterage Company, a training school and a customs house still remained on the north quayside.

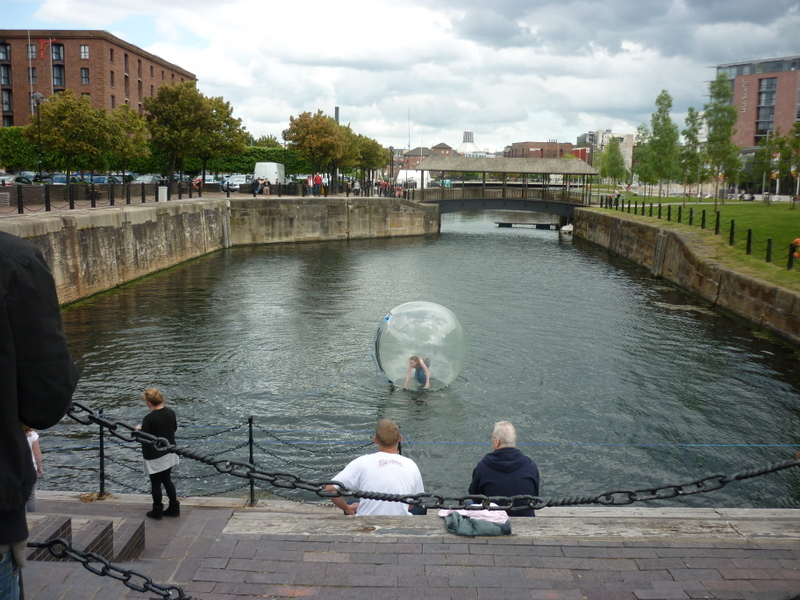
Water balling at Duke's Dock. The Albert Dock warehouses are to the left, with Liverpool Metropolitan Cathedral beyond the footbridge in the background.

In 1981, the Merseyside Development Corporation was established to rejuvenate the South Docks, and the dock was dredged between 1981-5. The river entrance was filled in during the 1980s, and replaced with a permanent roadway leading to a large temporary car park on the site of King's Dock. Footbridges across the dock, leading from the King's Dock car park to the rejuvenated Albert Dock, were also installed at this time. The remaining buildings on the north quayside were also removed, to create permanent car parking space for the Albert Dock.

== Present use ==
Direct river access to the west is no longer provided, with the only remains of the river entrance being markings on the dock wall. The dock is still accessible from Wapping Basin.

The water depth varies from around 6 ft (1.8 m) up to 20 ft (6.1 m). The dock is sometimes used by sport scuba divers. Its water is clear and it has much underwater sealife. The waterspace, of this and the other docks in the southern system, was owned by British Waterways from 2003 to 2012 and now transferred to the Canal & River Trust. Water balling is now allowed on the dock.
