= Thomas Morris (engineer) =

English architect and engineer

Thomas Morris (c.1754–1832) was an English architect and engineer. In 1784 he supervised the building of a dock at Glasson, on the River Lune.

In 1789 he became an engineer to Mersey Docks and Harbour Board, whilst at Liverpool, he was consulted regarding more docks at Glasson and completed Queens Dock.

He left Liverpool in 1799 to work at West India Export Docks in London.

He worked on the construction of All Saints Church in Poplar London between 1821 and 1823. After his death, he was buried at the church.

Preceded by Henry Berry	Engineer to Mersey Docks and Harbour Board; 1789-1799	Succeeded by John Foster, Sr.
