= Queen's Dock =

Queen's Dock may refer to:

- Queen's Dock, Port of Liverpool
- Queen's Dock, Swansea
- Queen's Dock, Glasgow (see SEC Centre)
- Queen's Dock, Hull
