= Tate Liverpool =

Art gallery in England

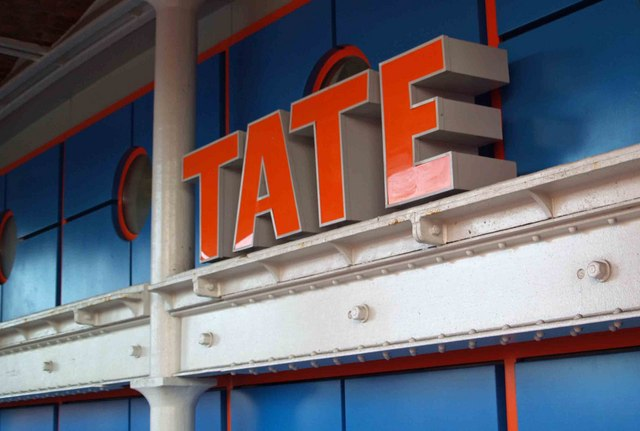
- Tate Liverpool in 2008
- Established: 1988
- Location: Royal Albert Dock, Liverpool, England
- Coordinates: 53.4008°N 2.9944°W
- Visitors: 660,022 (2019)
- Director: Helen Legg
- Website: www.tate.org.uk/visit/tate-liverpool

Tate
- Tate Britain; Tate Liverpool; Tate Modern; Tate St Ives

Tate Liverpool is an art gallery in Liverpool, Merseyside, England, and part of Tate, along with Tate St Ives, Cornwall, Tate Britain, London, and Tate Modern, London. The gallery was an initiative of the Merseyside Development Corporation. Tate Liverpool was created to display work from the Tate Collection which comprises the national collection of British art from the year 1500 to the present day, and international modern art. The gallery also has a programme of temporary exhibitions.

== History ==
Housed in a converted warehouse within the Albert Dock on Liverpool's waterfront, the gallery was opened on 24 May 1988 by Prince Charles, an event covered by BBC Two television. The original conversion was done by James Stirling but the building was given a major refurbishment in 1998 to create additional gallery space.

In 2007, the foyer area was redesigned by architects Arca to create an updated appearance and better proportions, as well as to improve visitor handling. The gallery café was also redesigned by Peter Blake and Liverpool-based architects, Architectural Emporium. The centrepiece of the space is a new timber desk with an undulating orange fascia, which links to the retained colour scheme of the original conversion work by Stirling. A colour-changing wall acts as a backdrop to the simplified brick volume, visible from across Albert Dock. Behind the scenes, Arca also made alterations to the hospitality, cloakroom, events and education areas.

== Renovation ==
The gallery closed in October 2023 for renovation work. Originally planned to take two years, it was announced in February 2025 that it was instead expected to reopen in spring 2027. Costing around £29.7 million, the works will see the galleries refurbished and the creation of new social spaces. During this period, the gallery has a temporary presence at RIBA North in Mann Island.

== Events ==
The gallery has played host to various events, including celebrations during the 2023 Eurovision Song Contest, performances as part of the Liverpool Biennial and Light Night and has hosted the Turner Prize awards ceremony twice, in 2007 and 2022.

== See also ==
- Liverpool and the Black Atlantic
