= Thomas Steers =

English civil engineer

Thomas Steers was thought to have been born in 1672 in Kent and died in 1750. He was England's first major civil engineer and built many canals, the world's first commercial wet dock (the Old Dock at Liverpool), St. George's Church at the site of Liverpool Castle, and a theatre. He designed Salthouse Dock in Liverpool, which was completed by Henry Berry after Steers' death.

== Early life ==
Thomas Steers was born in 1672, probably at Deptford or Rotherhithe. He is thought to have had a good education, in view of his obvious skills in mathematics, and he joined the army during his teenage years. He was part of William of Orange's 4th Regiment of Foot (The King's Own), which fought at the Battle of the Boyne in 1690, and subsequently campaigned in the Low Countries against the French until the Peace of Namur was signed in 1697. He probably learnt about hydraulics at this time, a skill which served him well in later years. In 1698 or 1699 he married Henrietta Maria Barber, and her father gave them a house in Queen Street, Rotherhithe.

At the time, the Great Dock at Rotherhithe was being constructed, on land leased from Elizabeth Howland, which formed part of the Howland Estate. There is no record of Steers's direct involvement in the project, although he produced a survey of the completed docks in 1707, and seems to have been employed as a surveyor for the estate. A lease agreement at the time described him as a house-carpenter.

== Engineering ==
In 1708, plans for a dock at Liverpool, similar to that at Rotherhithe, were formulated, and had been drawn up by George Sorocold and Henry Huss by mid-1709. Neither man accepted the offer to act as engineer for the construction of the docks. On 17 May 1710, the Town Council learned that Steers was in Liverpool and had his own designs for the project, which involved reclaiming land from the Pool rather than building the dock of existing land. The precise reason for Steers' arrival in Liverpool is not clear, but may well be connected to the rise to power of James Stanley, who became mayor in 1707 and Lord Lieutenant of Lancashire until 1710, and who had noticed Steers in Flanders, while commanding the 16th Regiment of Foot. Steers' design was accepted, and the construction was overseen by him, assisted by William Braddock. He also contracted for some of the excavation work, and although it was incomplete at the time, the dock opened for shipping in 1715. A tidal basin and three graving docks or dry docks were authorised by another Act of Parliament obtained in 1717, and during their construction, various alterations and extensions were made to the original dock. The works were completed in 1721. Since 1717, Steers had also acted as Dock Master, for which he was paid £50 per year, and Braddock had been the Water Bailiff. From 1724, he took over Braddock's role as well, though was no longer paid, as this post included a number of perks and fees.

Concurrently with his work on the Liverpool Docks, Steers was active in other projects. He surveyed the rivers Irwell and Mersey from Bank Quay at Warrington to Manchester in 1712. An Act of Parliament authorizing the Mersey and Irwell Navigation was passed in 1721 and the work, which included eight locks in a distance of 15 miles (24 km) to overcome a rise of 52 feet (16 m), was completed about 1725. It is generally believed he was the engineer. The authorising Act named him as one of the Undertakers.

He also made surveys for the Douglas Navigation which connected the Ribble estuary to Wigan in 1712, and was again named as an Undertaker in the Act of Parliament obtained in 1720. He built a lock and a bridge, straightened a section of the river, and started the construction of a tidal lock, but his partner William Squire, who was raising finance for the scheme in London, became involved in the South Sea Bubble, and appears to have lost most of the money he raised. With the money gone, Steers moved on. The navigation was eventually completed in 1742, and carried coal from Wigan to Liverpool and onwards to Ireland by ship.

His most significant navigation achievement was the Newry Canal, in Ireland, which was the first summit-level canal in the British Isles. The promoters asked him to act as engineer for the scheme in 1729, but then declined to pay him the fees he requested, and so the initial construction work was overseen by Edward Lovett Pearce. Pearce died in 1734, and his assistant, Richard Castle, took over the role. Steers returned to the project in 1736, when he conducted a survey of the existing work. Castle was sacked in December 1736, and Steers then supervised construction until 1741, working on a part-time basis. The work took longer than expected, and the canal finally opened in the spring of 1742. The 19.4 miles (31.2 km) of canal included 13 locks, and ran from Newry, where it connected to Carlingford Lough and the sea by a narrow channel, which was made into a ship canal in the 1760s. At its northern end it ran to Portadown where it joined the Upper Bann River to reach Lough Neagh. It was built to transport coal from the Tyrone collieries to Dublin.

In order to build locks with a larger fall than was possible with conventional gate paddles, Steers built two of the locks with sluices and ground paddles, which fed water into the bottom of the lock through the side walls. Water supply for the summit level was taken from local streams, supplemented by water from Lough Shark, which was used as a reservoir. As a whole, the work was not well executed, and the innovative locks had to be rebuilt soon after 1750.

== Other activity ==
Besides his work on docks and canals, Steers was involved with a wide range of other projects. Even the Mersey and Irwell Navigation and the Douglas Navigation were promoted not just to make carriage of existing trade easier, but to generate new trade which would contribute to the prosperity of the region. Jointly with Sir Cleave Moore and Sir Thomas Johnson, he promoted the Liverpool Waterworks in 1720. He set up a smithy making anchors near the Liverpool Docks, and was a partner in the Dove, a ship which traded between Liverpool and the West Indies.

He appears to have been a keen amateur architect (before that term was in popular parlance) and as well as the work on Liverpool Old Dock, executed alongside chief mason Edward Litherland, is paid in the accounts of The Blue Coat School (1715) once again with Litherland, "a new Street, called Chorley Street or Squire's Garden" (1720), St. George's Church (1725) (Litherland cited as mason) and what would become Salt House Dock once again winning the contract along regular collaborator Litherland. Their working relationship ended with Litherland's death in 1739. His best known architectural work was that of "Seel's House" on Hanover Street, Liverpool which would later become a bank before making way for the Liverpool One Tesco supermarket. It is highly likely that he designed a number of other buildings in Liverpool, no longer extant, including buildings on Paradise Street.

In 1725 he became a commissioner for the turnpike road from Prescot to Liverpool, and drew up plans for St George's Church on the site of the Liverpool Castle. He subsequently was responsible for the construction of its foundations and steeple. He built houses for poor and destitute seamen in 1739, and opened the Old Ropery Theatre in the following year.

Steers became a Freeman of the town of Liverpool in 1713, and served on the town council in 1717. In 1719 and 1722, he was a Town Bailiff, became mayor of Liverpool from 1739 to 1740, and was an Out-burgess in Wigan in 1746. He was responsible for the fortification of Liverpool during the Jacobite rising of 1745.

== Family ==
Steers' first marriage to Henrietta Maria ended in 1717 with her death. Of their seven children, four died in childhood, while the other three are thought to have become seamen, and all had died by 1732. In 1719 he married Ann Tibington, who came from Rotherhithe and was the widow of a seaman. She had a son called John, and they had four children of their own, two of which died in childhood. He died in 1750, and was buried in the grounds of St Peter's Church. His only surviving son, Spencer, carried on his anchor making business after his death.

There was also a Thomas Steers, lime burner of Greenwich (probably the owner and/or digger of "Jack Cade's Cavern" and of a nearby sand mine) who was born about this time and in the right area, but who was probably not the same person. Other Steers were involved in pottery. This hints at an extended Steers family with interests in kilns and building mortar.

== Legacy ==
Despite his considerable contribution to civil engineering, his death went almost unnoticed, although the civil engineer John Smeaton, writing to the Calder and Hebble Navigation in 1757, noted that Steers was an esteemed man of character and ability in his profession. He built the first successful commercial dock in the world, and the United Kingdom's first summit level canal. He trained his assistants well, as several went on to have illustrious careers of their own. Above all, he understood his work in its wider social context, being active in the politics and trade of Liverpool, and understanding the need for the town to be well-connected to its hinterland. His work paved the way for Liverpool to become one of the world's greatest ports, and was a contributory factor in the industrial revolution which began shortly after his death.

== See also ==
- Mersey and Irwell Navigation

== Bibliography ==
- Cumberlidge, Jane (2002). The Inland Waterways of Ireland. Imray Laurie Norie and Wilson. ISBN 978-0-85288-424-9.
- Hadfield, Charles; Biddle, Gordon (1970). The Canals of North West England, Vol 1 (pp.1-236). David and Charles. ISBN 0-7153-4956-2.
- L.T.C. Rolt (1969). Navigable Waterways. Longman. ISBN 978-0-582-12751-7.
- Skempton, Sir Alec; et al. (2002). A Biographical Dictionary of Civil Engineers in Great Britain and Ireland: Vol 1: 1500 to 1830. Thomas Telford. ISBN 0-7277-2939-X.

=== References ===
Preceded by	Engineer to Mersey Docks and Harbour Board; 1710–1750	Succeeded by Henry Berry
