= Liverpool and the Black Atlantic =

Series of exhibitions initiated by Tate Liverpool

Liverpool and the Black Atlantic was a season of citywide series of exhibitions and events initiated by Tate Liverpool exploring connections between cultures and continents.

Between January – April 2010, art galleries and museums in the city including Tate Liverpool, Bluecoat Chambers, Metal, FACT Foundation for Art and Creative Technology, the Walker Art Gallery, International Slavery Museum and Sudley House all programmed exhibitions and public events in response to the Black Atlantic theme.

== Tate Liverpool ==
Afro Modern: Journeys through the Black Atlantic

The Tate show takes from Paul Gilroy's book The Black Atlantic: Modernity and Double Consciousness, published in 1993 in which he coined the term 'The Black Atlantic' in describing the fusion of black cultures with other cultures from around the Atlantic. Afro Modern: Journeys through the Black Atlantic focused on Gilroy's idea of the Atlantic Ocean as a 'continent in negative', a network of surrounding and interconnecting cultures spanning Africa, North America, South America, the Caribbean and Europe, in tracing the real and imaginary routes taken by artists across the Atlantic from 1909 to today and the impact of different black cultures from around the Atlantic on art from the early twentieth century to today to reveal how black artists have played a central role in the formation of Modernism. The exhibition included work by artists including Romare Bearden, Constantin Brâncuși, Renee Cox, Aaron Douglas, Walker Evans, Ellen Gallagher, David Hammons, Isaac Julien, Wifredo Lam, Ronald Moody, Wangechi Mutu, Chris Ofili, Uche Okeke, Pablo Picasso, Keith Piper, Tracey Rose and Kara Walker among others.

== Walker Art Gallery ==
Aubrey Williams: Atlantic Fire

Painter Aubrey Williams’ life and interests spanned the Black Atlantic and its universal themes, ideas and ideals. The exhibition Atlantic Fire contributes to a reassessment of Williams as an important international artist with a global outlook and a readiness to question an assumed dichotomy of figurative and abstract art.

== The Bluecoat ==
Sonia Boyce: Like Love – Part 2

Like Love – Part 2 was a multi media installation exploring universal ideas around the concept of care. Sonia Boyce also curated the Bluecoat's additional gallery spaces in recognition and celebration of her involvement in Black Skin/Bluecoat, her first exhibition at the Bluecoat in 1985.

== FACT (Foundation for Art and Creative Technology) ==
Promised Lands

Devised by Edward George and Anna Piva (Flow Motion), Promised Lands comprised a multi-disciplinary performance piece that fused music, words and triptych images in an exploration of the 'promised land' of the migrant experience intersected by history, fantasy and mythology spanning five continents over five centuries.

== Metal ==
Leo Asemota: The Handmaiden

Advancing his longstanding work The Ens Project Leo Asemota's installation in the engine room of the Grade II listed Edge Hill station unravel from myth, folklore and contemporary history, the origins of The Handmaiden, a being central to the completion of his project.

== International Slavery Museum ==
Black Britannia

An exhibition of 30 portraits by photographer John Ferguson celebrating the contribution that Black people have made to British culture and public life over the last few decades.

== Sudley House ==
Lubaina Himid: Jelly Mould Pavilions

Using Sudley House as the starting point for a citywide trail of jelly mould pavilion models artist Lubaina Himid hand-painted jelly moulds to represent possible designs for public monuments that commemorate people of the African Diaspora and their contribution to the city of Liverpool.

== Reviews ==
- Afro Modern at Tate Liverpool: Voyage of rediscovery by Jonathan Jones
- Behind the masks: Afro Modern at Tate Britain by Fred D’Aguiar
- Review of Afro Modern by Sam Thorne in Frieze magazine
- In Pictures: Union Black by Amanda Sebestyen

•
