= Royal Albert Dock, Liverpool =

Complex of docks and buildings in Liverpool, England

Royal Albert Dock
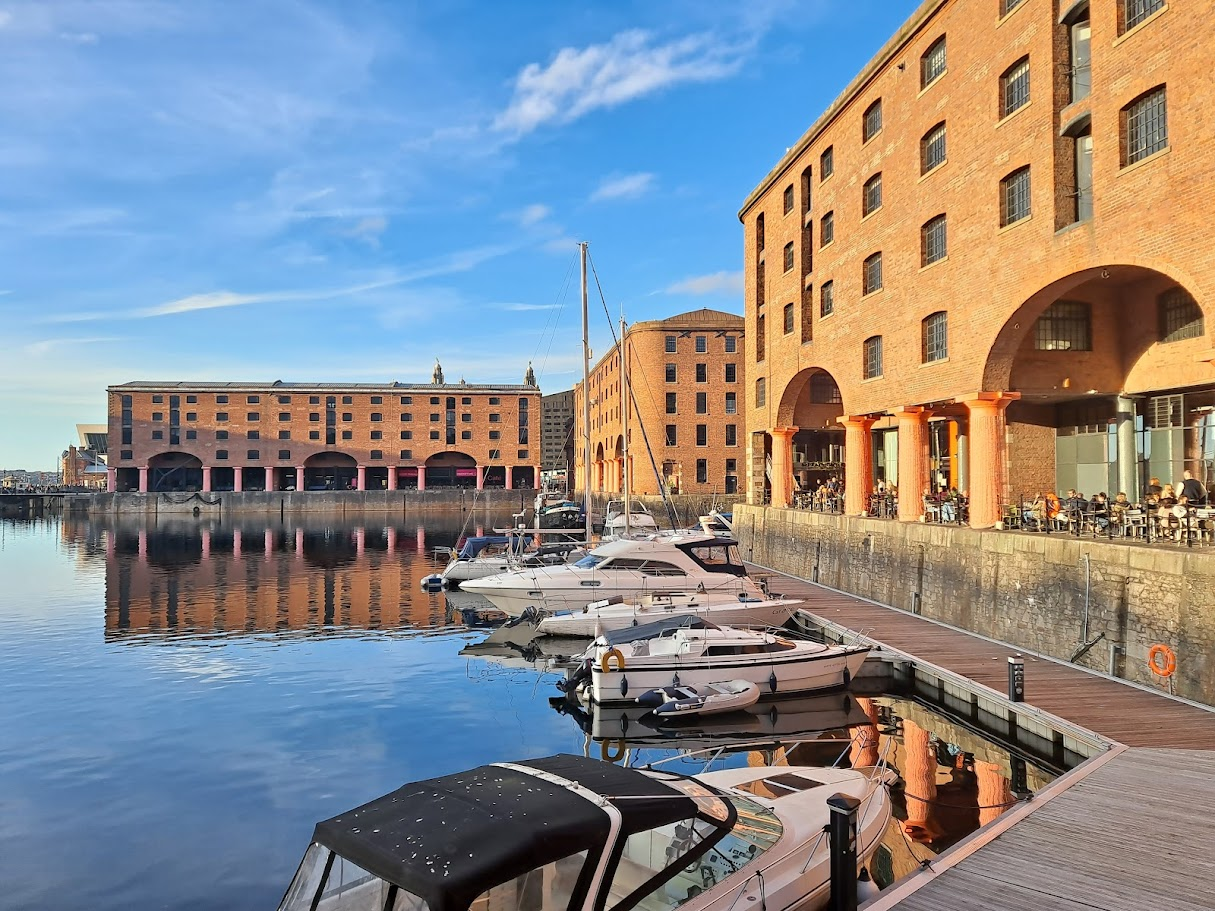
- Waterfront of the Royal Albert Dock, Liverpool

- Location within Liverpool

General information
- Location: Liverpool
- Coordinates: 53°24′1.08″N 2°59′33.72″W
- Current tenants: The Beatles Story, Merseyside Maritime Museum, Tate Liverpool
- Construction started: 1841
- Completed: 1846 (official opening), 1847 (structural completion)
- Cost: £782,265
- Owner: Albert Dock Company Ltd

Technical details
- Floor area: 1.29m sq ft (warehouse space), 7.75 acres (dock basin area)

Design and construction
- Architects: Jesse Hartley, Philip Hardwick

The Royal Albert Dock is a complex of dock buildings and warehouses in Liverpool, England. Designed by Jesse Hartley and Philip Hardwick, it was opened in 1846, and was the first structure in the United Kingdom to be built from a combination of cast iron, brick, and stone without also using wood for any structural element. As a result, it was the first non-combustible warehouse system in the world. It was known simply as the Albert Dock until 2018, when it was granted a royal charter and had the honorific "Royal" added to its name.

At the time of its construction, the dock was considered to be revolutionary in its design because ships were loaded and unloaded directly from or to the warehouses. Two years after it opened, it was modified to feature the world's first hydraulic cranes. Due to its open yet secure design, the dock became a popular store for valuable cargoes such as brandy, cotton, tea, silk, tobacco, ivory and sugar. However, despite its advanced design, the rapid development of shipping technology meant that, within 50 years, larger and more open docks were required, although the Albert Dock remained a valuable store for cargo.

During the Second World War, the dock was requisitioned by the Admiralty serving as a base for ships of the British Atlantic Fleet. The complex was damaged during air raids on Liverpool, notably during the May Blitz of 1941. In the aftermath of the war, the financial problems of the owners and the general decline of docking in the city meant that the future of the Albert Dock was uncertain. Numerous plans were developed for the re-use of the buildings but none came to fruition and in 1972 the dock was finally closed. Having lain derelict for nearly ten years, the redevelopment of the dock began in 1981, when the Merseyside Development Corporation was set up, with the Albert Dock being officially re-opened in 1984.

Today the Royal Albert Dock is a major tourist attraction in the city and the most visited multi-use attraction in the United Kingdom, outside London. The five warehouses which make up the complex cover 1.25m sq ft in size, the biggest such group of Grade I listed buildings anywhere in the UK.

== History ==
=== Grand beginnings and early history ===
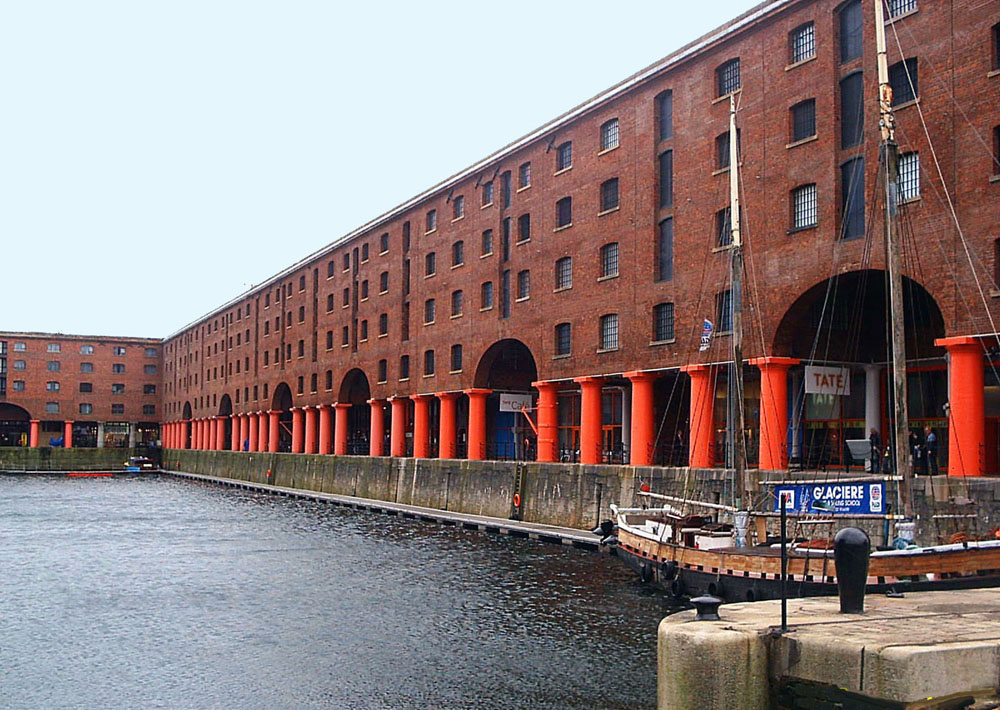
The Albert Dock's design allowed ships to lay up and be loaded and unloaded directly from the large warehouses.

The history of the Albert Dock dates back to 1837, when Jesse Hartley first began the development of plans for a combined dock and warehouse system. The plans drawn up by Hartley and fellow civil engineer Philip Hardwick for the Albert Dock were at the time considered quite 'radical', as they envisioned the loading and unloading of ships directly from the warehouses. However, this idea was not new, and as far back as the 1803 Warehousing Act, legislation had been passed to allow this form of development to occur, whilst the concept was first actually used in the construction of St Katharine's Dock in London, which was opened in 1828. As part of the development process, Hartley was eager to test the fire resistance of any particular design by constructing an 18 ft (5.5 m) by 10 ft (3.0 m) dummy structure, filling it with timber and tar, and setting it alight. After testing several structural designs he settled on the combination of cast iron, brick, sandstone and granite. The design was submitted for planning permission in 1839 although it was not until 1841, when the bill authorising the design of the dock was eventually passed by Parliament, that construction was allowed to begin.

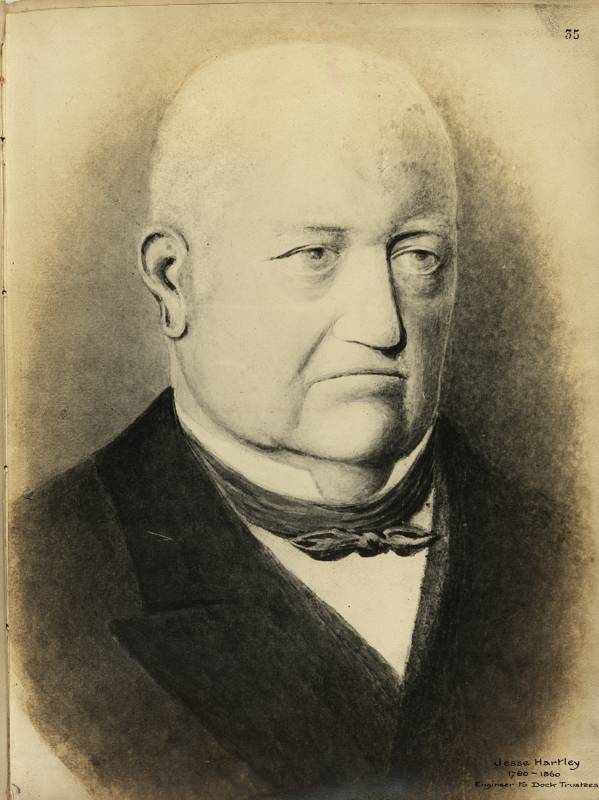
Jesse Hartley

The site chosen for the dock to be built on was an area of land bordered by Salthouse Dock to the east, the entrance channel to Canning Dock to the north and by Duke's Dock to the south. The land earmarked for the site had to be cleared, with 59 tenants being evicted and numerous premises demolished including a pub, several houses and the Dock Trustee's Dockyard. Upon the clearance of this land both the Salthouse and Canning docks were drained to allow entrance passages into the Albert Dock to be constructed, whilst hundreds of "navvies" were employed to dig out the dock basin and construct the new river wall. The dock basin was completed by February 1845, allowing the first ships to enter the Albert Dock, although with the warehouses still under construction this was merely to allow these boats to "lay-up".

The dock complex was officially opened in 1846 by Albert, Prince Consort, husband of Queen Victoria and the man in honour of whom it was named. This event marked the first occasion in Liverpool's history in which a member of the Royal Family had made a state visit to the city and as a result the occasion was marked with a major celebrations. Many thousands of people turned out for the Royal visit with the newspaper The Pictorial Times noting the reception Prince Albert received:

His reception was most enthusiastic; balconies were erected along the line of procession, and these and the windows of houses were filled with gay and animated parties. There was a most brilliant display of flags, banners & c. [sic]. All business is suspended. There are 200,000 strangers in town, and all the inhabitants are in the streets. All is gaiety and splendour. (The Pictorial Times, 1846).

The Prince was taken on a processional tour through the city, including a visit to the town hall where the royal address was made, before departing aboard the ferry across to the Cheshire side of the Mersey and then northwards towards the Albert Dock. Again this stage of the procession route was laden with onlookers with The Pictorial Times describing the Prince's entrance into the Albert Dock:

From the Cheshire side of the river the Fairy crossed to the Liverpool side, and returned along the line of docks amidst the cheers of assembled thousands and the roar of artillery. The sight was really magnificent, all the ships in the docks were decked out in gayest colours and the river was crowded with boats filled with people. At half-past two the fairy entered the dock, where were assembled two thousand ladies and gentlemen, the elite of the town; they cheered enthusiastically, which his Royal Highness returned, and in order to gratify the crowd sailed round the dock. (The Pictorial Times, 1846).

Despite the official opening taking place in 1846, the construction of the Albert Dock was not fully completed until 1847. In 1848, a new dock office was built and the dock itself was upgraded to feature a hydraulic cargo handling hoist system, the first of its kind in the world. Over the next decade several more buildings were added including houses for the piermaster, his assistant, and the warehouse superintendent; and a cooperage. Warehousing in the dock was also expanded to meet the increasing demand by joining together the eastern and western ends of the Southern Stack.

=== Changing fortunes and role in the Second World War ===
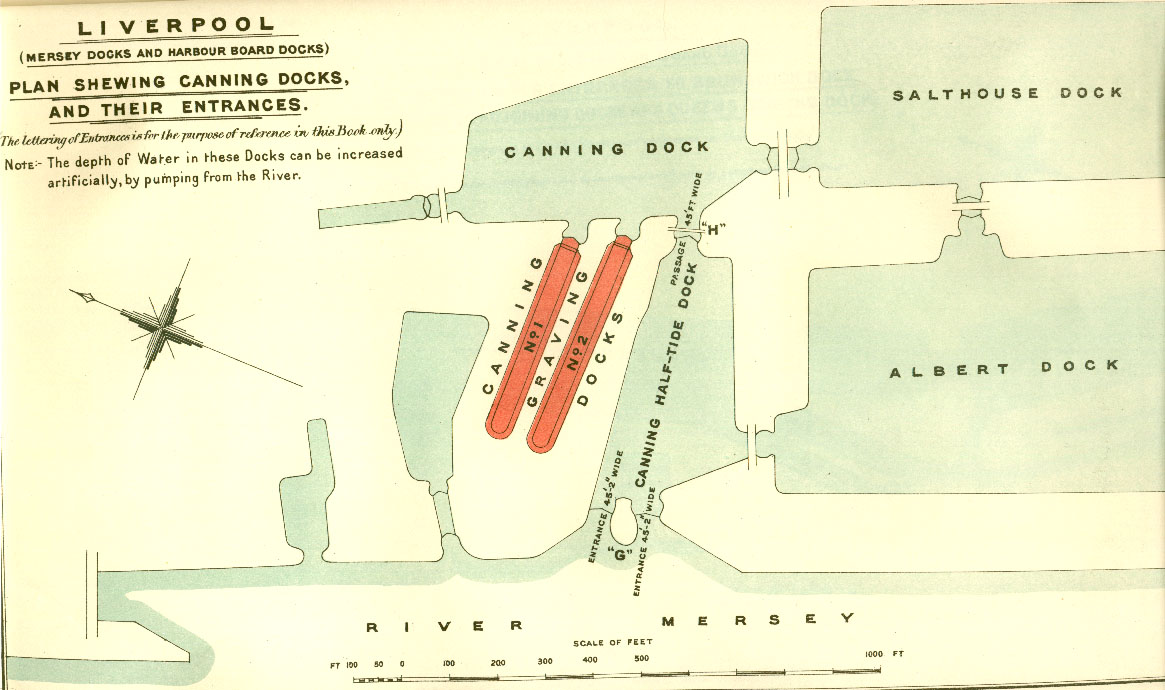
British Empire Dockyards and Ports, 1909

The enclosed design of the Albert Dock and the direct loading and unloading of goods from warehouses, meant that the complex was more secure than other docks within Liverpool. As a result, it became a popular store for valuable cargoes including brandy, cotton, tea, silk, tobacco, ivory, and sugar. Their openness to natural light and well ventilated stores, meant natural goods such as hemp or sugar could be kept fresher longer. The dock came to dominate Liverpool's far eastern trade, with over 90% of the city's silk imports from China coming through it and more generally half of all the far eastern trade income.

Despite the great prosperity the dock afforded the city, within 20 years of its construction the Albert Dock was beginning to struggle. Designed and constructed to handle sailing ships of up to 1,000 tonnes, by the start of the 20th century only 7% of ships into the Port of Liverpool were sailing vessels. The development of steam ships in the later 19th century meant that soon the dock simply was not large enough, as its narrow entrances prevented larger vessels from entering it. Its lack of quayside was also becoming an issue. Generally steamships could be loaded and unloaded far quicker than sailing ships, and in a cruel twist of irony, the dockside warehouses that had once made the Albert Dock so attractive, were now hindering its future development. Nonetheless the Albert Dock remained an integral part of the dock system in Liverpool, and in 1878 the pump house was built as part of redevelopment that saw the majority of the cranes converted to hydraulic use. In 1899, part of the north stack was converted to allow for ice production and cold storage.

By the 1920s, virtually all commercial shipping activity had ceased at the dock, although its warehouses did remain in use for the storage of goods transported by barge, road or rail. The onset of the Second World War, in 1939, saw the Albert Dock requisitioned by the Admiralty and used as base for the British Atlantic fleet. This included submarines, small warships, and landing craft docking. During the war, the dock was struck on several occasions by German bombs. This included one bombing raid in 1940 that damaged ships within the dock. More destructively, during the May Blitz of 1941, bombing caused extensive damage to the south west stack. By the end of the war, almost 15 per cent of the dock's floor space was unavailable due to bomb damage.

=== Post War history and decline ===
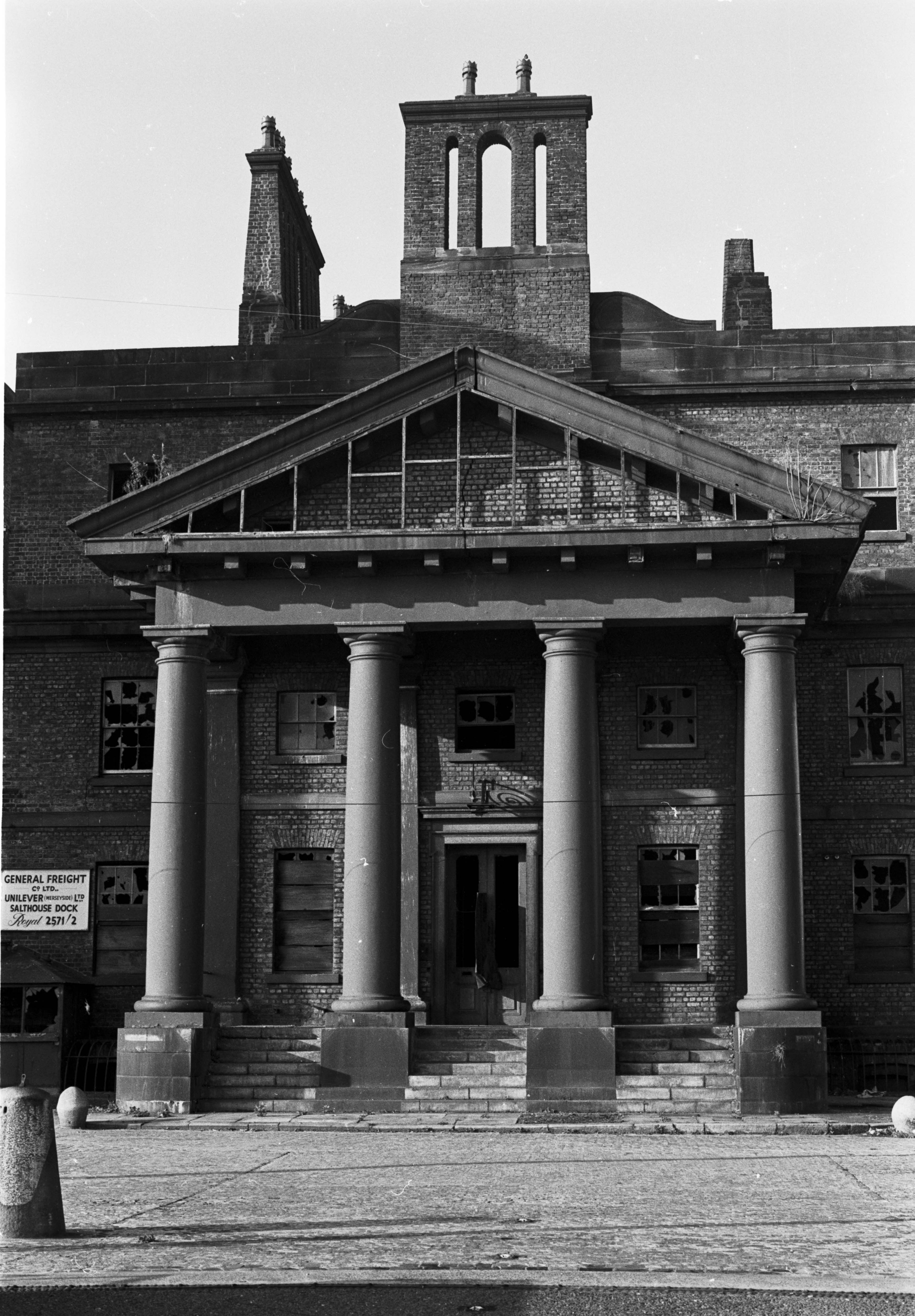
Dock office in 1976

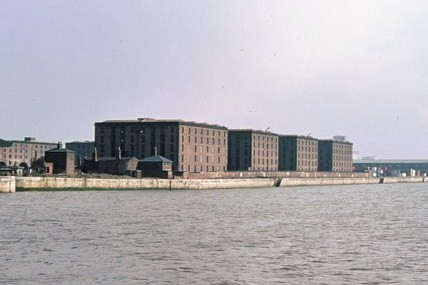
The Albert Dock viewed from the River Mersey in 1979

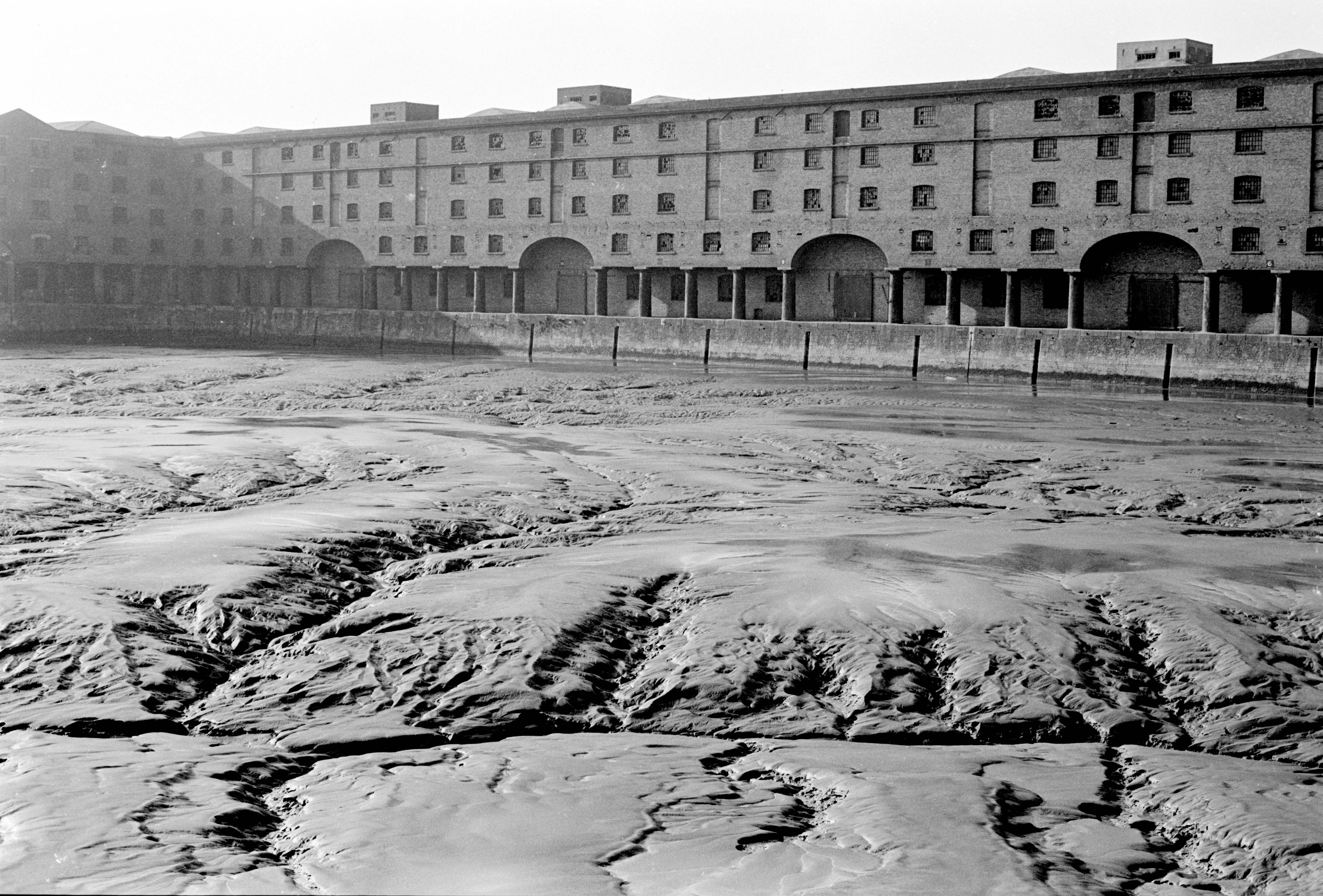
Silted up dock before proposed demolition 1982

By the time the Second World War had finished the Albert Dock's future looked bleak. The owners of the dock, the Mersey Docks and Harbour Board (MDHB), were in financial crisis and chose not to repair any of the wartime bomb damage, adopting an attitude of "if it's not broke don't fix it, and if it is broke we still won't fix it". At the same time a change in geopolitical orientation towards Europe, coupled with the advent of containerisation, meant the whole docking system in the city of Liverpool suffered as newer, stronger ports emerged elsewhere in the UK. Nonetheless the architectural and technological value of the docks was recognised in 1952 when the Albert Dock was granted Grade I listed building status.

Despite this recognition, the increasing debts of the MDHB meant that by the 1960s the company was eager to get rid of the Albert Dock. Having considered demolishing the buildings and redeveloping the land, the MDHB soon entered negotiations to sell the land to Oldham Estates, a property developer owned by Harry Hyams. Many plans for the site were developed including one that envisioned the development of a mini city that would provide 10 million square feet of letting space, hotels, restaurants, bars and underground parking in the drained dock basin. With the council reluctant to allow such a grandiose development to occur and with the huge public opposition to it (inspired at least in part by the work of Quentin Hughes), Oldham Estates were forced into scaling-down the plan and so in 1970 returned with a new vision known as "Aquarius City", which had as its centrepiece a 44-storey skyscraper. Once again the plan failed to develop and no sooner had it been announced, than the MDHB's financial problems reached crisis point, Oldham Estates withdrew their deposit and the whole scheme fell through.

With the MDHB on the verge of bankruptcy a decision was taken to shut down and sell off the whole of the south docks system. The warehouses were emptied and in 1972 the Albert Dock finally closed down. The Brunswick Dock gates, which separated the South Docks system from the River Mersey, were opened allowing tidal movements in and the process of the clogging up the docks with sewage polluted silt began. In many senses just as the Albert Dock's development had symbolised the prosperity in the Liverpool at the time of its construction, its subsequent decline after the Second World War symbolised the collapse of the local economy as a whole.

Throughout the early 1970s plans continued to emerge for the redevelopment of the Albert Dock site and the whole of the south docks system in general. Many of these plans were quite extreme including Liverpool City Council's suggestion to use the dock basin as a landfill site. The Mersey Docks and Harbour Company (MDHC), the reincarnation of the now defunct Mersey Docks and Harbour Board, however felt it could get more money by filling in the dock basin with sand and selling it as developable land and not derelict land. One plan for the Albert Dock that was taken more seriously was the idea that it become the new home of Liverpool Polytechnic (now Liverpool John Moores University). The government was even willing to provide £3m in funding but like so many other plans this too fell by the wayside.

The creation of Merseyside County Council (MCC) in 1974 brought new hope that the Albert Dock could be redeveloped, with the MCC placing a high priority on its development. They soon entered negotiations with the MDHC and in 1979 eventually negotiated a deal to take over the running of the south docks. Despite this seeming step forward political wrangling between the MDHC (the dock owners), Liverpool City Council (the local planning authority) and Merseyside County Council (the group now responsible for redeveloping the docks) continued to hinder any development plans. Fed up with the infighting the newly elected Conservative government of Margaret Thatcher decided that the city was incapable of handling regeneration initiatives itself and under the guidance of the 'Minister for Merseyside' Michael Heseltine, set up the Merseyside Development Corporation in 1981 to take over the responsibility of regenerating and redeveloping Liverpool's south docks.

=== The MDC and regeneration of the Albert Dock ===
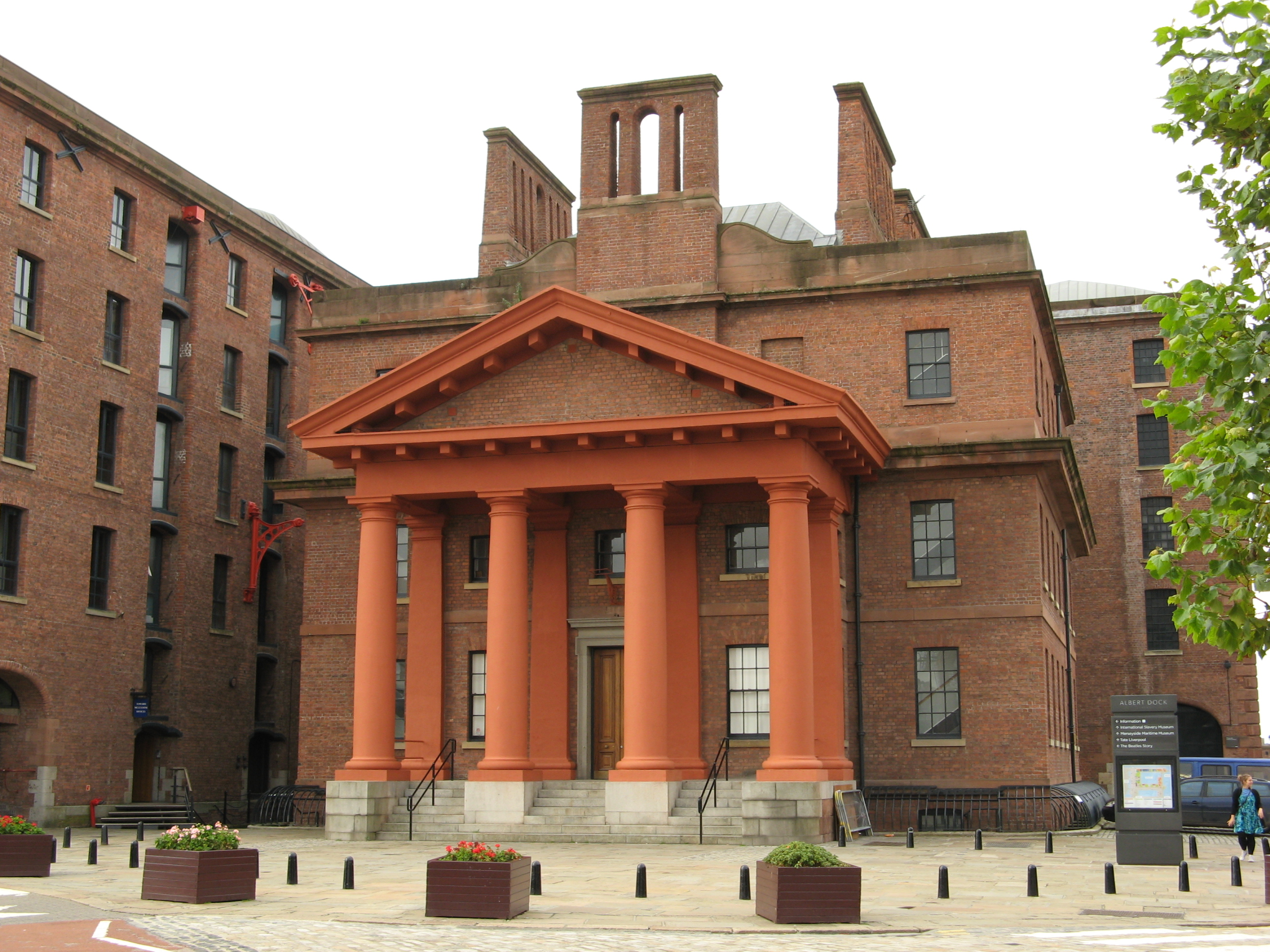
The former Dock Office was for many years the home of Granada Television in Liverpool.

The creation of the Merseyside Development Corporation (MDC) in 1981 was part of a new initiative launched by the then Conservative government that earmarked the regeneration of some 800 acres (3.2 km^{2}) of Liverpool's south docks, by using public sector investment to create infrastructure within an area that could then in turn be used to attract private sector investment. Thus the MDC was not directly responsible for regeneration programmes but rather acted as a spearhead, guiding the development process. Upon its formation it immediately created an initial strategy for the area placing a high priority on restoring those buildings that could be restored & demolishing the rest, restoring a water regime within the dock system (including the removal of up to 40 ft (12 m) of silt) and general environmental landscaping. As part of the strategy two flagship schemes were set up: the redevelopment of a site in Otterspool for the International Garden Festival and the regeneration of the Albert Dock.

In 1982 the MDC entered into negotiations with London-based developers Arrowcroft in order to secure much needed private sector investment. On a visit to the site, Arrowcroft's chairman Leonard Eppel spoke of how the buildings "talked to him" and upon his return to London set about persuading the company's board to take on the project. In September 1983 a deal was signed between Arrowcroft plc and the MDC leading to the creation of the Albert Dock Company, which could now start the process of regenerating the Albert Dock.

One of the first priorities of the regeneration was the restoration of the dock system, which had deteriorated rapidly since the Brunswick Dock gates had been left open. Contaminated silt was removed from the dock basin, dock gates were replaced & bridges restored, whilst the dock walls were repaired. The Albert Dock company appointed Tarmac Construction to renovate the dock's vast warehouses and repair war time bomb damage. Structural surveys carried out by the MDC found the brickwork and foundations to be in very good condition and it was considered a testament to the strict build quality of Hartley's design that a building almost 150 years old was still in such good condition.

The floating weather map of the British Isles, from ITV's This Morning

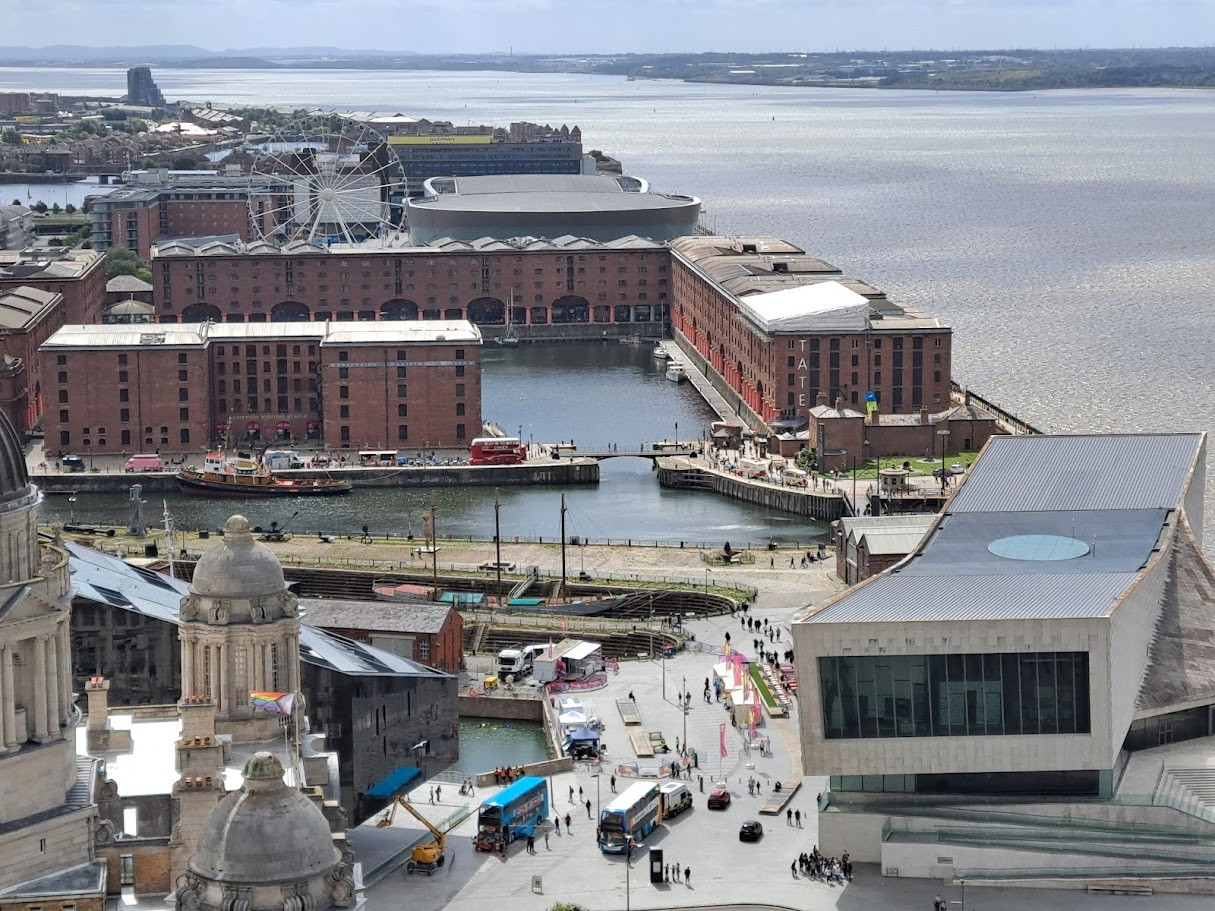
Aerial view of the Royal Albert Dock from the Liver Building

Development within the Albert Dock was rapid and the newly renovated Edward Pavilion (formerly north east stack) was ready in time for the 1984 Cutty Sark Tall Ships' Races. The race was a big success for the city with over one million visitors into Liverpool over a period of four days, of which 160,000 visited the Albert Dock. In total it is estimated that the two flagship regeneration schemes of the MDC, the tall ships race and International Garden Festival, attracted over 3.5 million visitors to Liverpool in 1984. The same year, the renovation of the dock traffic office was completed; it was fitted out and leased to Granada Television.

Spurred by the success of the tall ships race and the International Garden Festival, Arrowcroft pushed on with the Albert Dock's renovation. With the Edward Pavilion refurbishment a success soon the company started on the Britannia and Atlantic pavilions (formerly the south and south east stacks), the latter of which required major structural repairs because of bomb damage it received during World War II. In 1986 the Merseyside Maritime Museum completed its move into the Albert Dock, having moved some exhibitions into the building in 1984. The museum, developed by Merseyside County Council had previously been located in the pilotage building and a salvage shed nearby. 1986 also saw work begin on the largest of the dock warehouses, the Colonnades (formerly west stack). Ground floor shops were created with office space on the mezzanine level and apartments on the remaining floors. The first 37 of these apartments were completed by 1988 and the speed with which they sold was likened to 'sales day at Harrods'.

The Albert Dock was officially re-opened in 1988 by The Prince of Wales, the great-great-great-grandson of Prince Albert, the man who had originally opened the docks. It was timed to coincide with the opening of the newly finished Tate Liverpool, which was dubbed the 'Tate of the north' and at the time the only one outside London. The decision to locate a Tate gallery in Liverpool was seen as a major success for the city, as it made Liverpool home to the National Collection of modern art in the North of England.

In 1988, ITV's new morning television show This Morning, hosted by Richard and Judy, began broadcasting from a studio inside the Albert Dock. As part of the show, weather presenter Fred Talbot used a floating map of the British Isles to report the forecast. Two years later, in 1990, The Beatles Story museum opened, the only Beatles-themed visitor attraction in Britain, providing yet another draw to the Albert Dock.

Throughout the 1990s development continued including a new hotel and the conversion of vacant space for use by larger companies such as Telewest (Now Virgin Media). Finally in 2003, some 22 years after the renovation of the Albert Dock started, the last remaining undeveloped space was brought into use with the opening of a new Premier Lodge hotel in the Britannia Pavilion.

In anticipation of the dock's 175th anniversary in 2021, the owners of the dock applied for a royal charter. At an event at Tate Liverpool on 6 June 2018 the royal charter was handed over. The dock became formally known as Royal Albert Dock Liverpool, to avoid confusion with the Royal Albert Dock in London.

== Structural design and construction ==
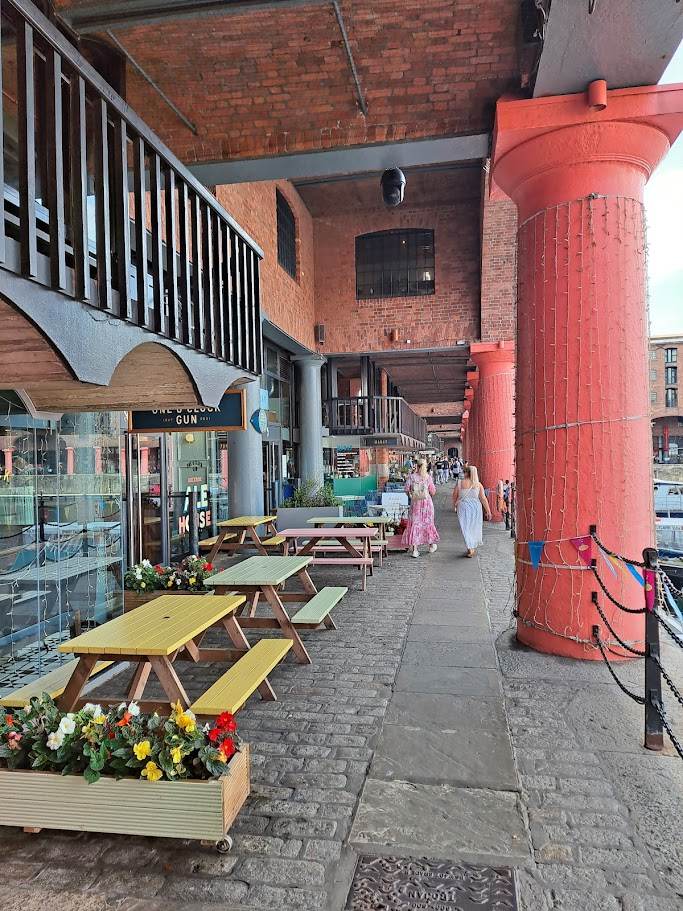
Huge cast iron columns line the Albert Dock's quayside helping to support the building above.

When it was constructed the Royal Albert Dock was considered a state of the art docking system. Built almost entirely from cast iron, stone and brick, the Albert Dock was designed to be fireproof, and on completion was the world's first non-combustible warehouse system. It provided 1,290,000 square feet (120,000 m^{2}) of warehouse space and its dock basin had a water area of 7.75 acres (3.14 ha). In its construction over 23 million bricks were used and 47,000 tonnes of mortar. In total it cost £782,265 (approximately £41m today), whilst today its estimated to be worth £230 million.

The building's design complements many existing construction techniques with, what were considered at the time, radical solutions. The warehouses are supported by large load-bearing walls that range from being 3 feet (0.91 m) thick at the base to 19 inches (480 mm) on the fourth level. One of the most advanced architectural features is the use of stressed skin roofing, which at the time of construction was virtually unheard of. Huge iron trusses are crossed with rivetted and galvanised wrought iron plates, creating a shape similar to an upturned boat hull that acts to support the roof above. The floors in the warehouses are supported by large iron columns and the spaces between were considered 'highly flexible', as new windows, stairwells and lift shafts could be added without risk to the building's structural integrity.

The advanced design stretches far beyond what can be seen from the ground. The structures are free from wood, but their foundations contain 13,729 piles of timber, which would stretch for 48 miles (77 km) in length if laid end to end. Such heavily supportive foundations were needed because the construction land was reclaimed from the River Mersey to build on. Given the 'quicksand' nature of the Mersey's tidal silt the piles were needed to provide maximum stability. The resultant effect of the dock being constructed where it was is that the north and west stacks (now Merseyside Maritime Museum and Colonnades) rise and fall with every tide.

One of the most notable features of the Albert Dock are the huge cast iron columns that line the quayside. At 15 feet (4.6 m) high and almost 13 feet (4.0 m) in circumference, the columns are based upon the Greek Doric style of architecture. Hartley's decision to use cast iron was an economic one as at the time it was cheaper than granite. Nonetheless, because of the huge dock walls that were built, the Albert Dock's construction required so much granite that the dock trustee's had to open their own mine in Kirkcudbrightshire in Scotland. The quality of the build materials used as well as the docks sheer size are considered a strong illustration of the great prosperity that the Port of Liverpool afforded the city at the time and the building's style is described as cyclopean classicism.

== Albert Dock today ==
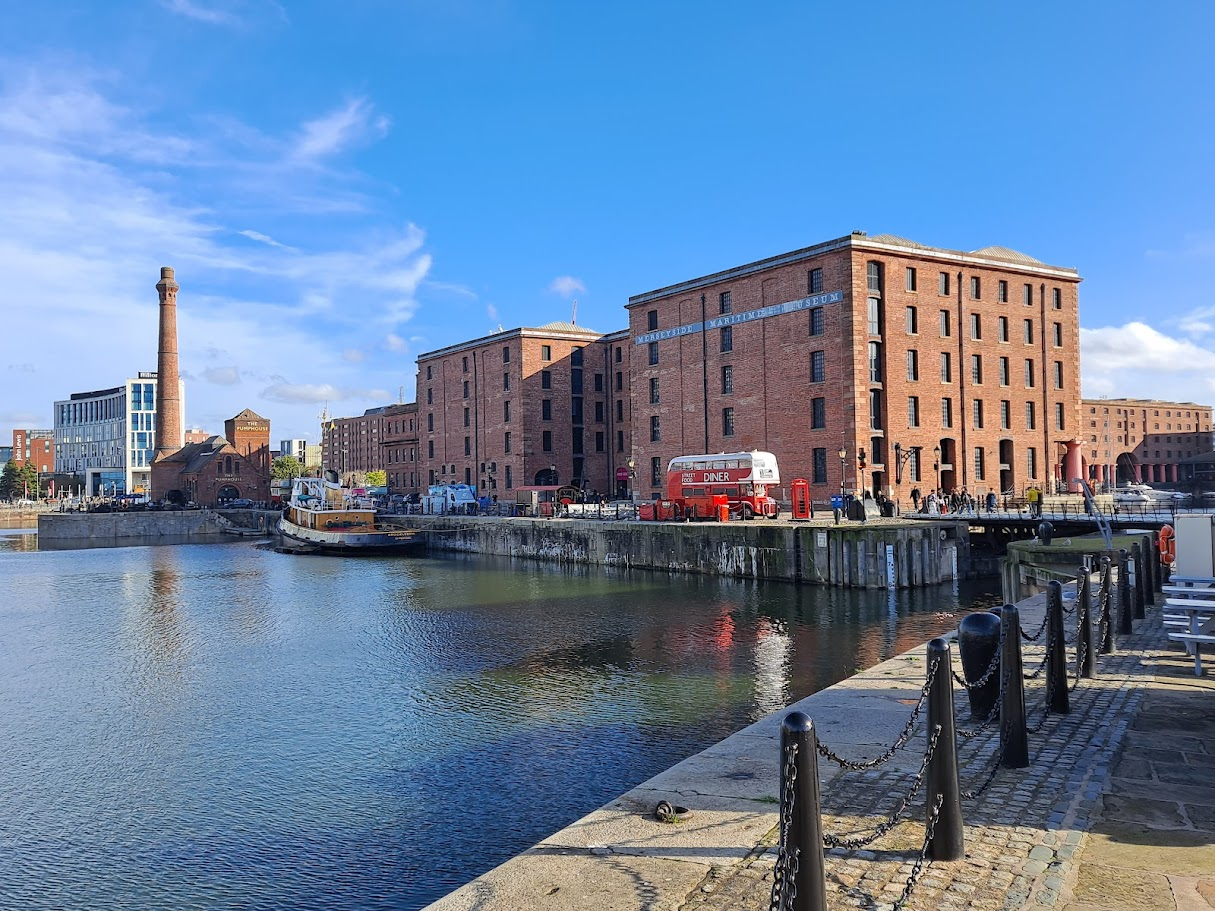
Merseyside Maritime Museum

As well as being the number one tourist attraction in Liverpool, the Albert Dock is also the most visited multi-use attraction in the United Kingdom outside London, with in excess of four million visitors per year. Amongst the many attractions at the Albert Dock are the Merseyside Maritime Museum, the Beatles Story and the Tate Liverpool. There are also two hotels within the Albert Dock: a Holiday Inn and Premier Inn both located in the Britannia Pavilion. All the five warehouses around the dock, referred to as A, B, C, D and E, are Grade I listed buildings. Collectively they cover 1.25m sq ft in size, the biggest such group of Grade I listed buildings anywhere in the UK. Also listed Grade I is the former dock traffic office. Other buildings around the dock are listed Grade II; they are the former hydraulic pumping station, and the swing bridge leading from the dock towards the Pierhead.

In the aftermath of the dock's regeneration in the 1980s a policy had been adopted to try to attract retailers into the newly created premises within. However, after many years of struggling to compete with other major shopping areas in the city, the Albert Dock Company Ltd announced in 2007 a shift into attracting more bars and restaurants. As of 2026, bars and restaurants resident in the Albert Dock include Lunyalita, Maray, Panam Bar & Restaurant, Revolution Bar, and Whats Cooking?

== See also ==
- Liverpool Maritime Mercantile City
- Grade I listed buildings in Merseyside
- Pier Head
- Port of Liverpool
- Merseyside Development Corporation
- Architecture of Liverpool
