= Wapping Dock =

Dock on the River Mersey, England

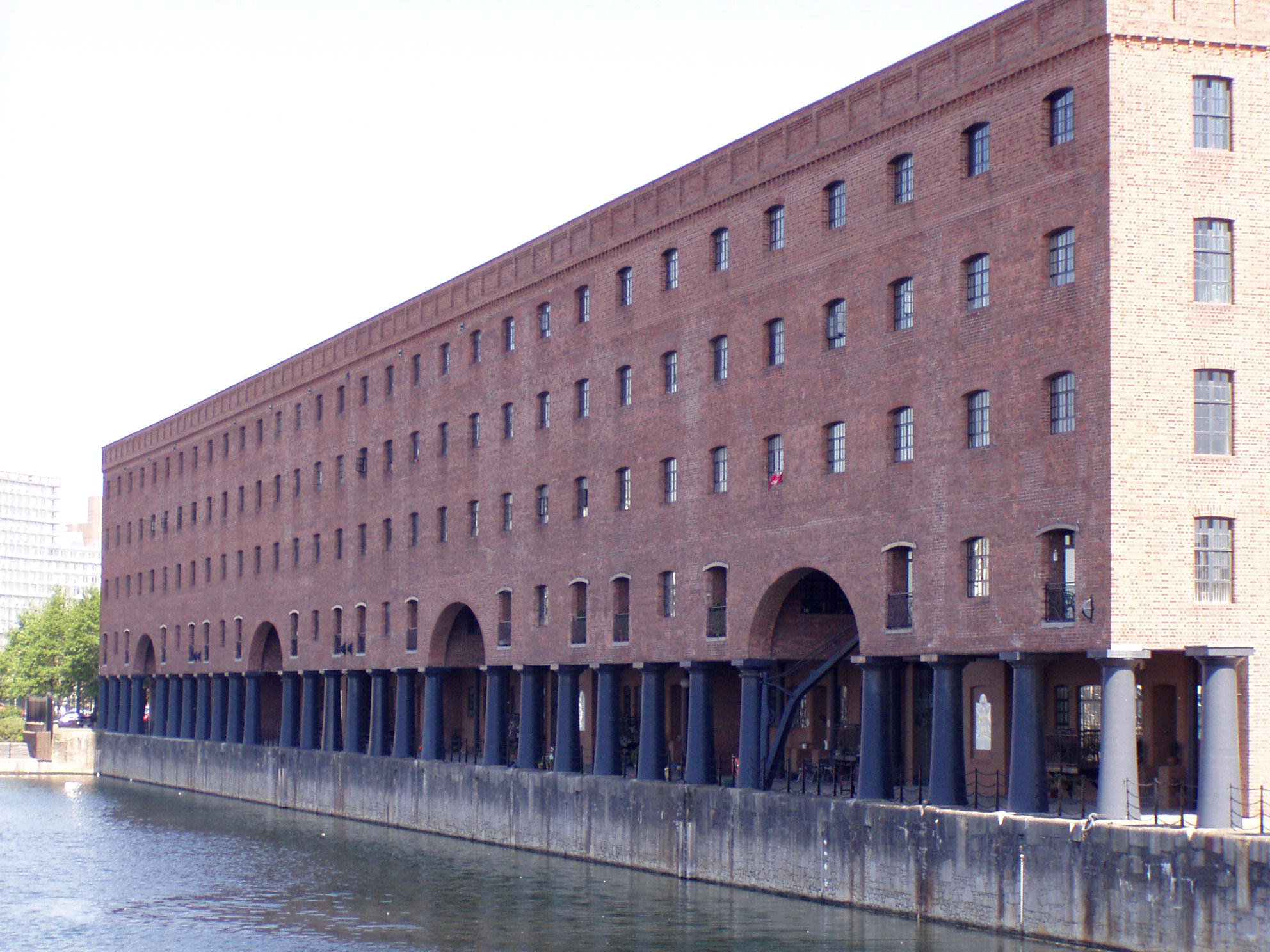
- Warehouse at Wapping Dock

Location
- Location: Liverpool, England
- Coordinates: 53.3971°N 2.9874°W
- OS grid: SJ344893

Details
- Owner: Canal & River Trust
- Opened: 1852
- Type: Wet dock
- Joins: Queen's Dock; Wapping Basin to Salthouse Dock
- Area: 5 acres (2.0 ha), 499 sq yd (417 m^{2})
- Width at entrance: 50 ft (15 m)
- Quay length: 1,815 yd (1,660 m)

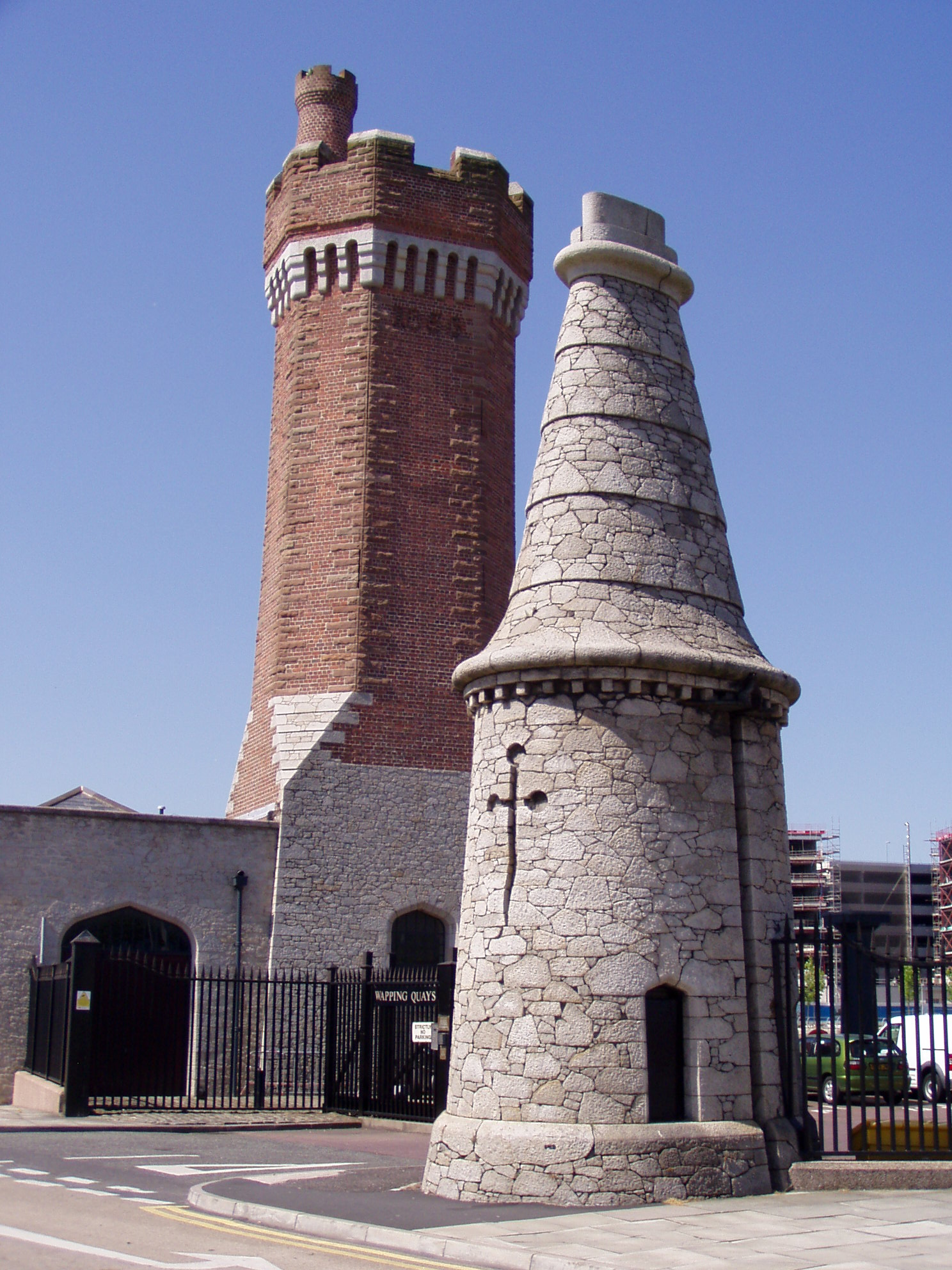
Hydraulic Tower and Gate Keepers Lodge

Wapping Dock is a dock on the River Mersey, England, and part of the Port of Liverpool. It is situated in the southern dock system, connected to Salthouse Dock to the north and Queen's Dock to the south. King's Dock was originally located to the west, but has since been filled in.

== History ==
The dock was opened in 1852. It was named after the road it runs alongside and which also gave its name to the Wapping Tunnel.

The large brick warehouse built in 1856 along the eastern side of the dock was designed by Jesse Hartley. The building is of a similar architectural style to the warehouses surrounding the nearby Albert Dock. When originally built, it was 232 m (254 yd) long and consisted of five separate sections. Bombed in the May Blitz of 1941, the badly damaged southernmost section was not rebuilt, with only the supporting cast iron columns remaining in situ. The remainder of the building continued in commercial use, even after the dock closed in 1972. The warehouse was restored and converted into residential apartments in 1988 and is Grade II* listed.

== See also ==
- Grade II* listed buildings in Liverpool – City Centre
