= South Ferry Basin =

Coordinates: 53.3902°N 2.9873°W

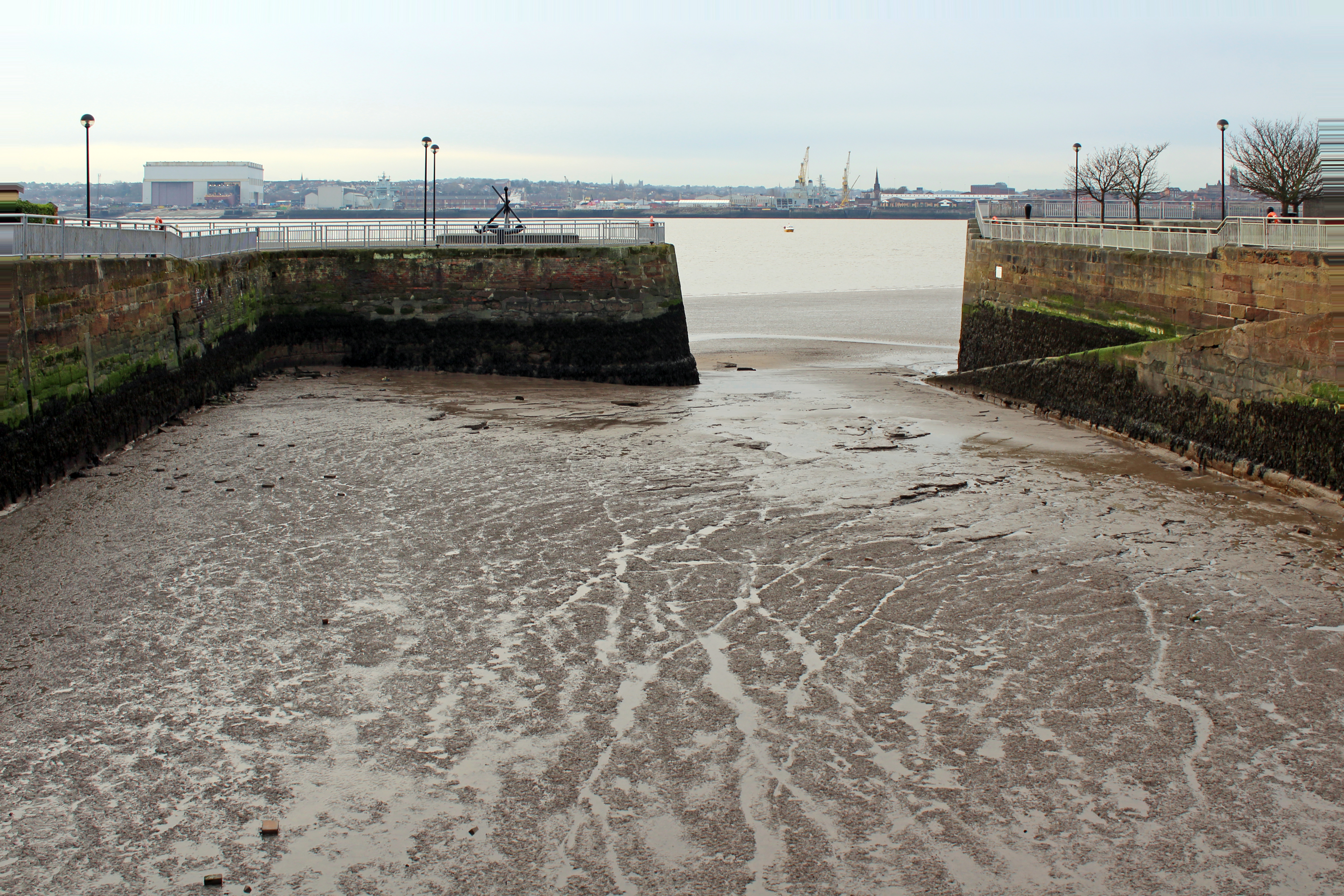
South Ferry Basin with the Cammell Laird shipyard, in the left background, across the River Mersey

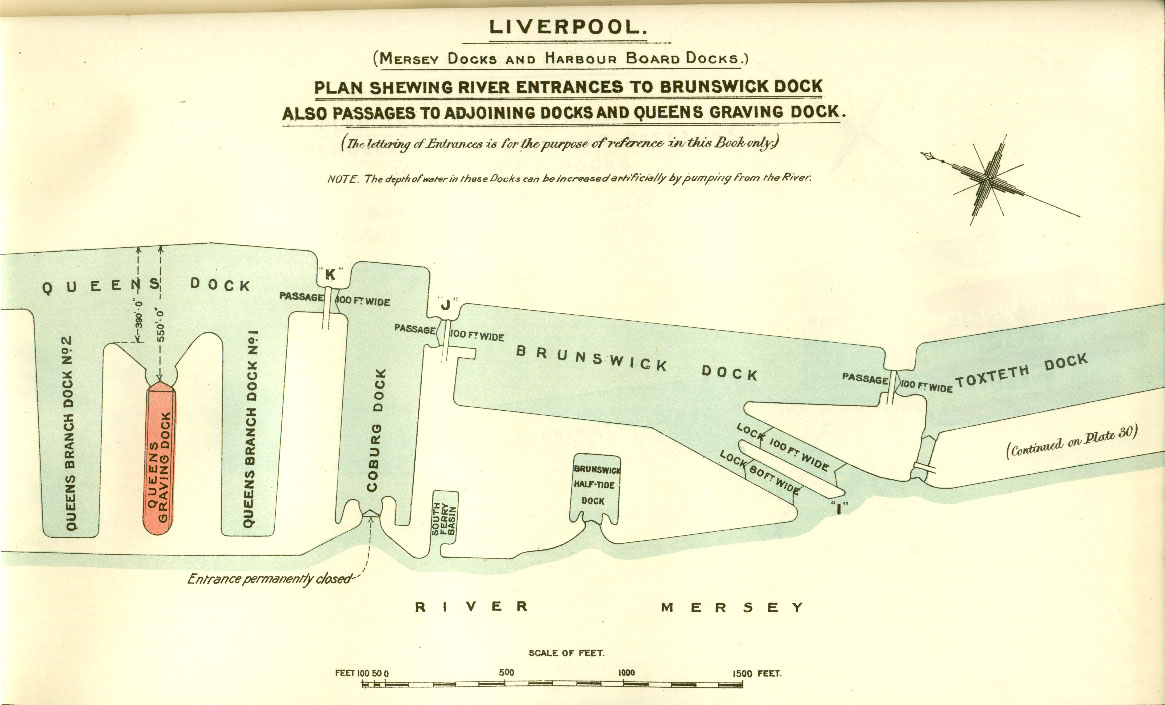
British Empire Dockyards and Ports, 1909

The South Ferry Basin is a tidal basin on the River Mersey, in England, and part of the Port of Liverpool. Situated near the southern dock system, it is only connected directly to the river.

== History ==
The basin was built c.1817–23 for use by fishermen and ferries. Around 1817, the Etna was built for ferrying passengers and vehicles from South Ferry Basin to Tranmere. From 4 April 1865 a ferry service was established between the South Ferry Basin and New Ferry on the Wirral Peninsula, with additional sailings to Liverpool Pier Head. Facilities at the basin consisted of a pontoon moored against the dock wall. The "South End" service appeared to be relatively short-lived, as by 1876, these facilities had been removed and sold for scrap.

This small basin was also known locally as the 'Cocklehole' and was a place that Liverpool ceded to the poor cocklefishers and oystercatchers for the mooring and repair of their boats whilst the main port of Liverpool handled the large trade. It was little known under its own name and often confused as being part of Coburg Dock.

It is a little basin between Coburg Dock and the Brunswick Half Tide, and there, for a little while longer, beneath an old-world quay, brown sails dip softly in a quiet haven. Fishermen sit and smoke above them, nets hang in the sun, low buildings with broken, domestic roofs run round a cobbled square; and in one corner a pier-master's cottage has its ivy, its curtains, its canary in a wicker cage. It is a relic that serves only to italicize the change.

— said of South Ferry Basin by Dixon Scott in 1907

== Present ==
The basin is open to the river and is currently heavily silted up. It isn't used for anything. Although the basin remains unaltered, the surrounding area has since been redeveloped for residential purposes.
