= Queen's Dock, Port of Liverpool =

Dock on the River Mersey in Liverpool, England

Queen's Dock
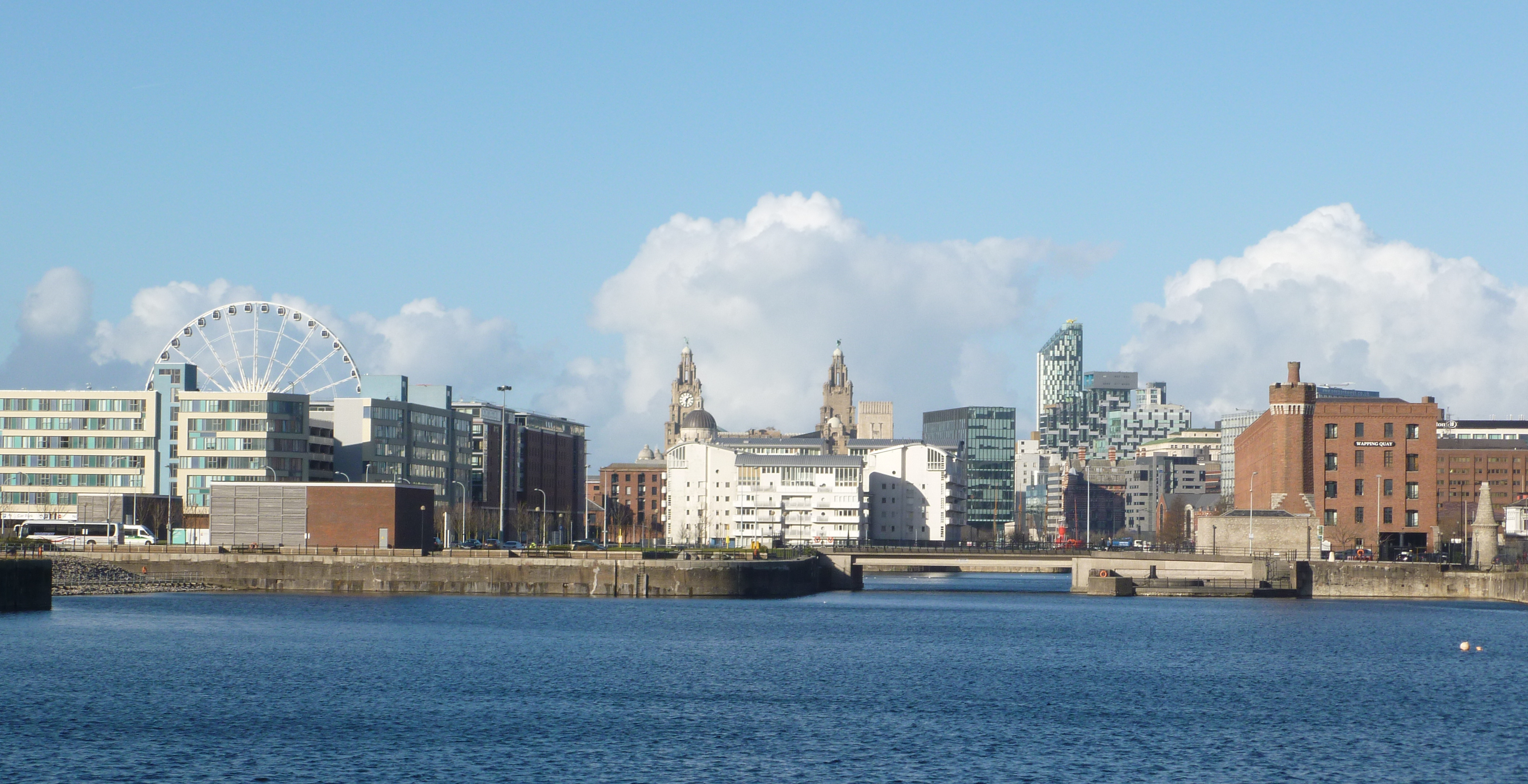
- The view across Queen's Dock towards the Pier Head in 2014

Location
- Location: Liverpool, United Kingdom
- Coordinates: 53.3940°N 2.9854°W
- OS grid: SJ345890

Details
- Owner: Canal & River Trust
- Opened: 1785
- Type: Wet dock
- Joins: Coburg Dock; Wapping Dock
- Area: 10 acres (4.0 ha), 1,568 sq yd (1,311 m^{2}) (in 1859)
- Width at entrance: 60 ft (18 m) (in 1859)
- Quay length: 1,214 yd (1,110 m) (in 1859)

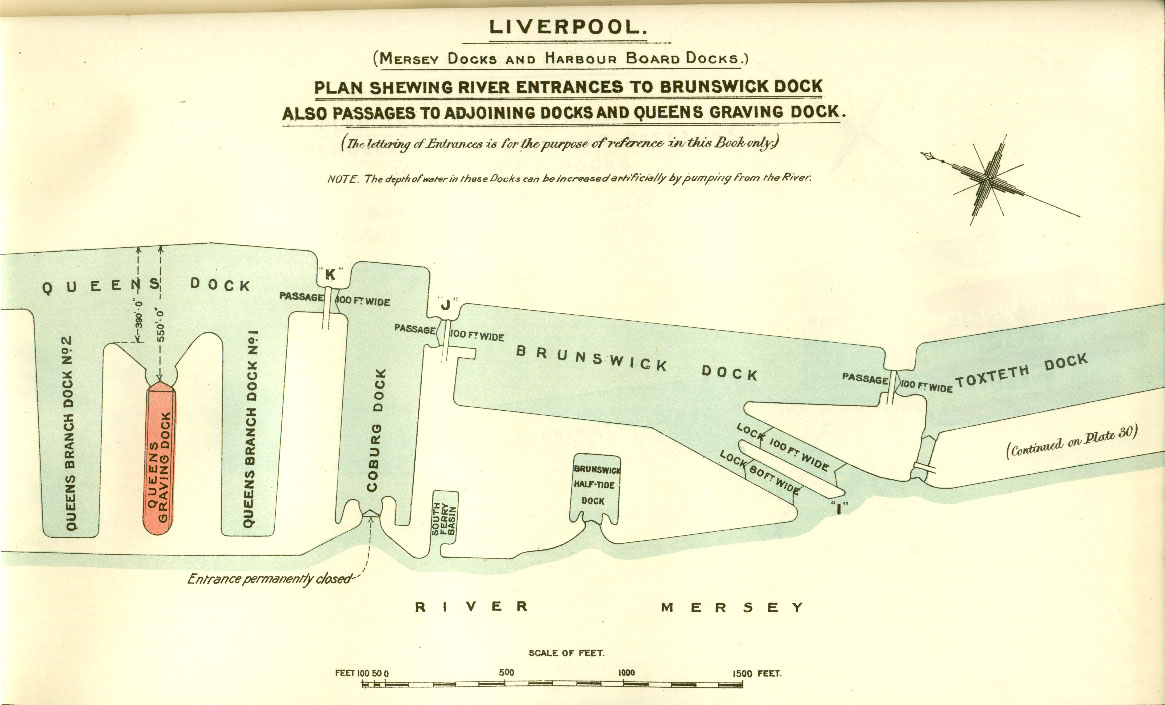
British Empire Dockyards and Ports, 1909

Queen's Dock is a dock on the River Mersey and part of the Port of Liverpool. It is situated in the southern dock system, connected to Wapping Dock to the north and Coburg Dock to the south.

== History ==
The dock was designed by Henry Berry and opened in 1785. The dock was named in honour of Queen Charlotte, the consort of George III, and it was later expanded by John Foster, Sr. At its largest, the dock consisted of a main basin and two branch docks, which were separated by a graving dock. Branch Dock Number 2 (to the north) has since been filled in and is used as a car park. The graving dock is now straddled by an apartment block, The Keel, which was formerly the HM Revenue and Customs building.

This and the other docks in the southern system were owned by British Waterways, transferred to the Canal & River Trust in 2012.

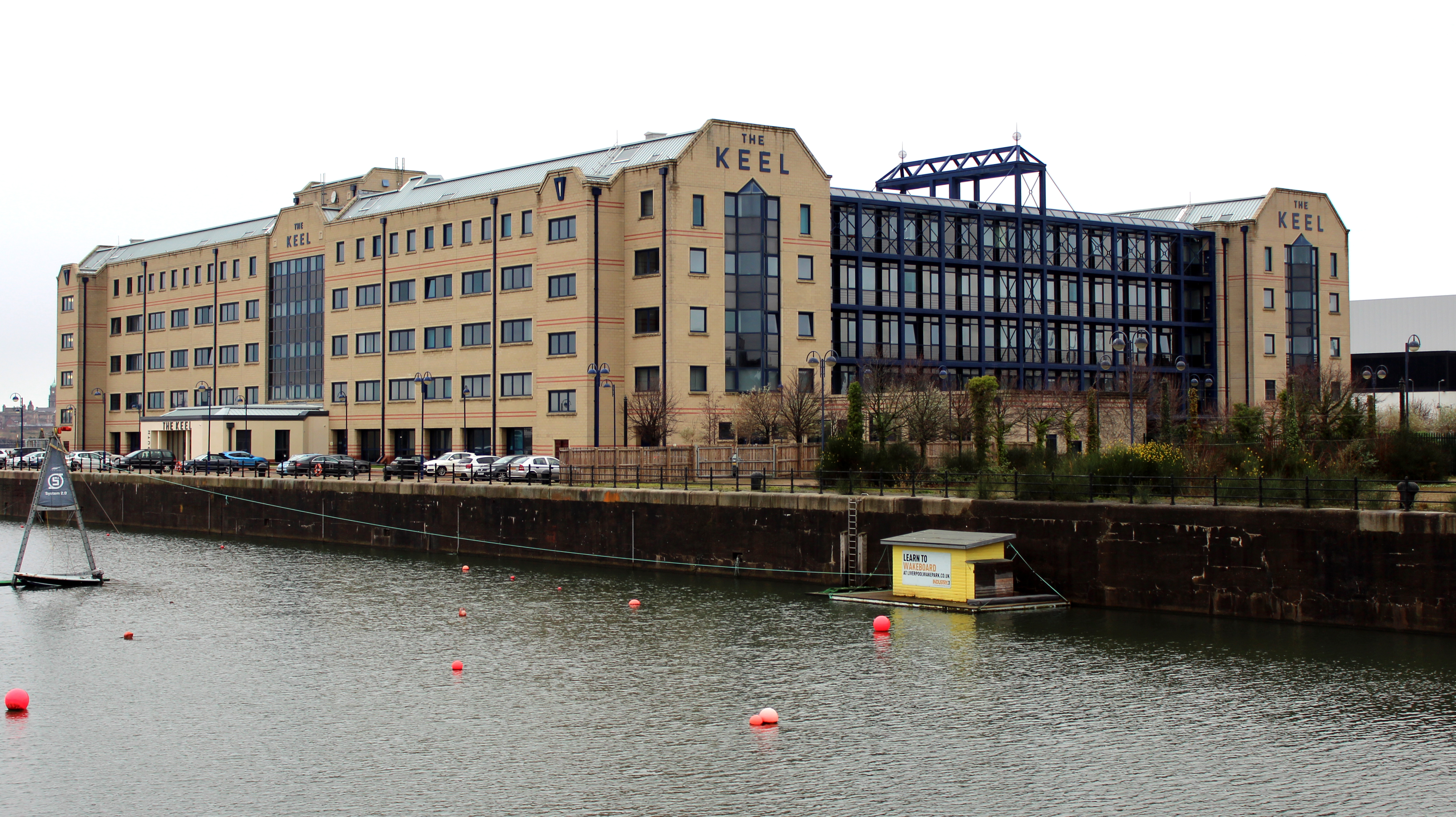
The Keel viewed over Queens Branch Dock No. 1

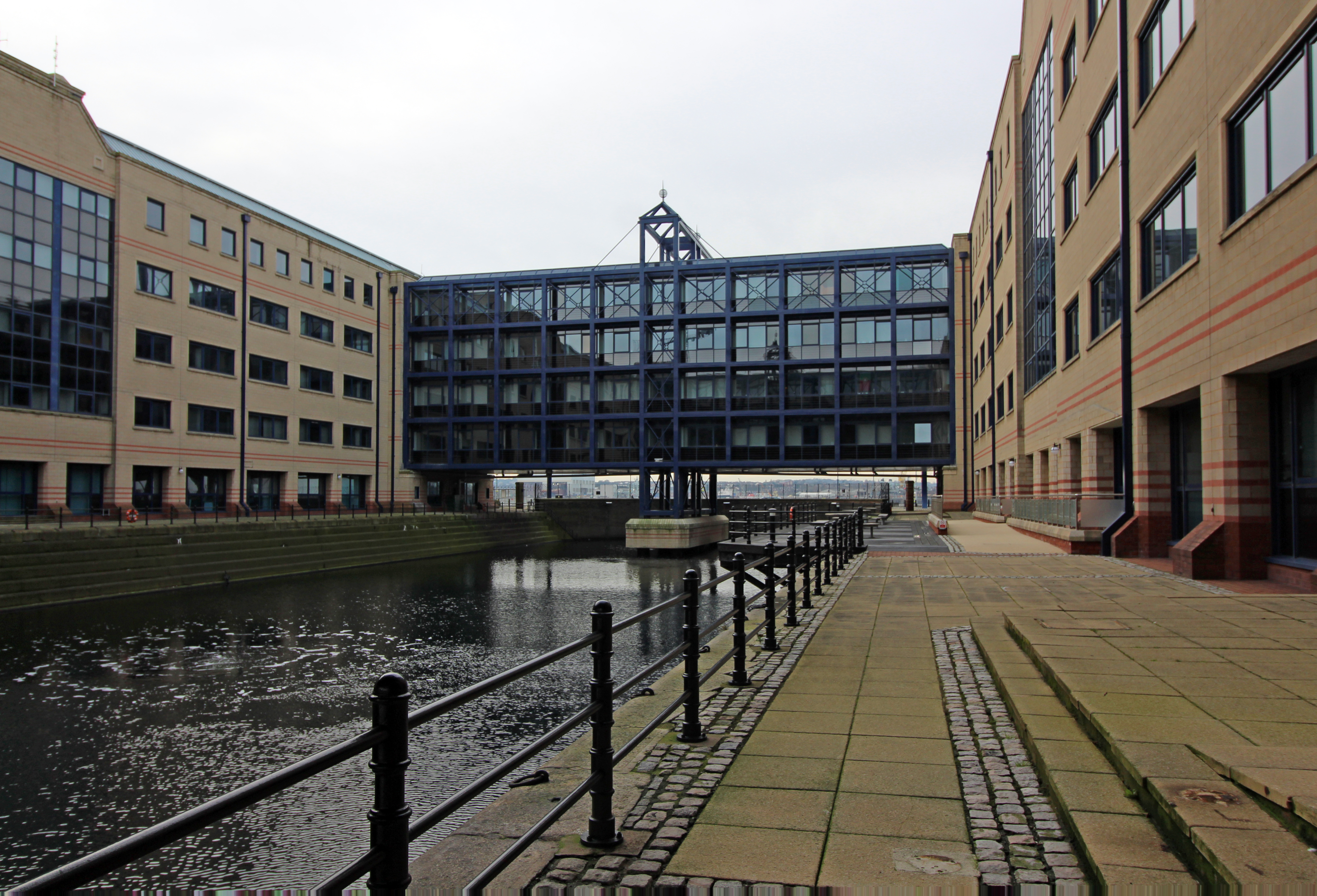
Central section of The Keel, over Queens Graving Dock

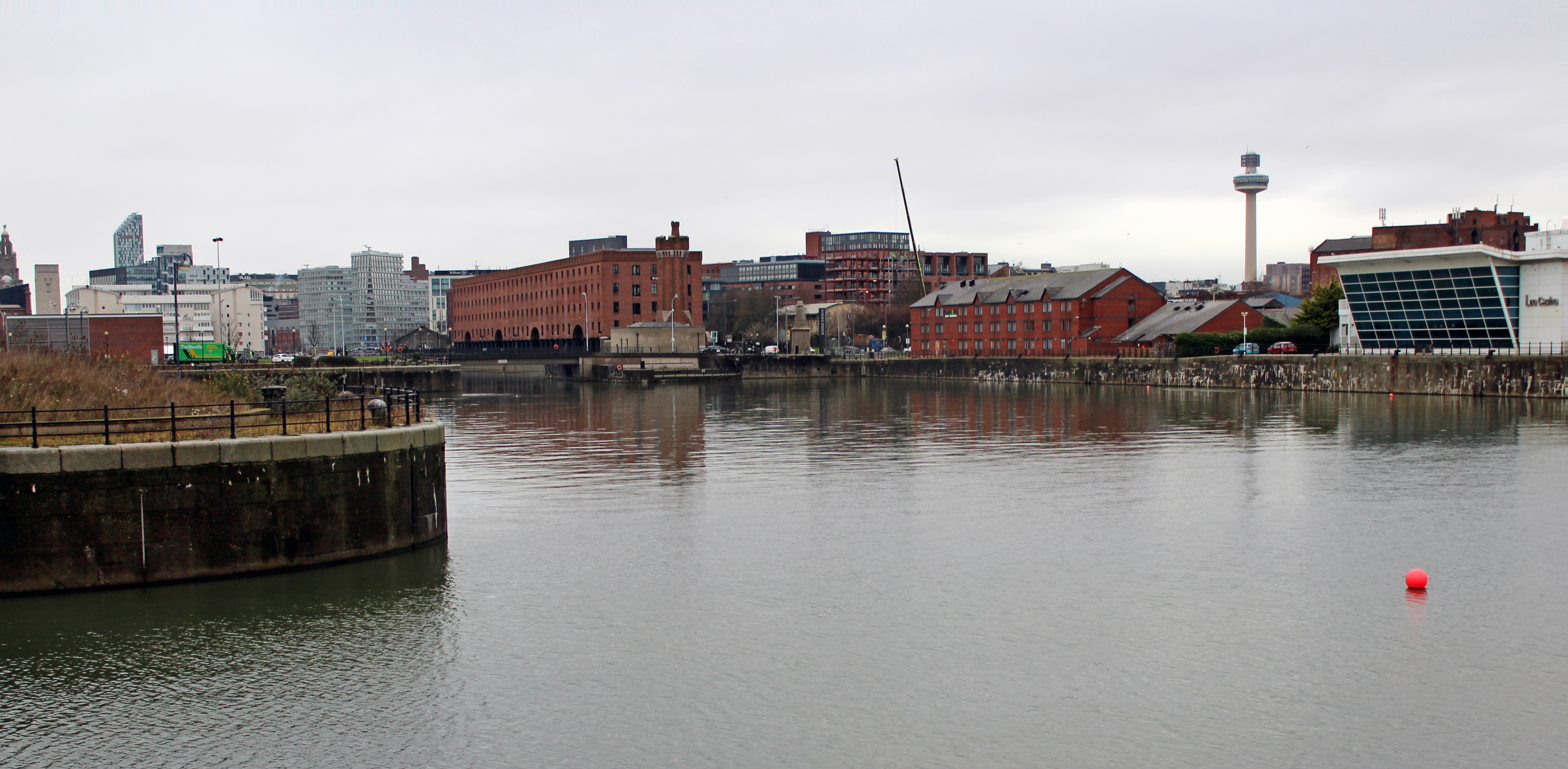
Looking north over Queens Dock
