= Henry Berry (engineer) =

British dock engineer

- Born: 1719
- Died: 1812 (aged 92–93)
- Occupation: Dock engineer

Henry Berry (1719 in England – 1812) was Liverpool's second dock engineer succeeding Thomas Steers and later being succeeded by Thomas Morris. Berry Street in Liverpool may be named after Berry who lived in a house at the junction with Duke Street, where the White Horse pub stands.

He built Salthouse Dock, George's Dock and King's Docks in Liverpool. He designed Queen's Dock for the Hull Dock Company which opened Tuesday 22 September 1778. In 1769 he checked Peter P Burdett's survey for the route of the Leeds and Liverpool Canal. He also designed the Sankey Canal.

Preceded by Thomas Steers	Engineer to Mersey Docks and Harbour Board; 1750-1788	Succeeded by Thomas Morris
