= Coburg Dock =

Dock in Liverpool, England

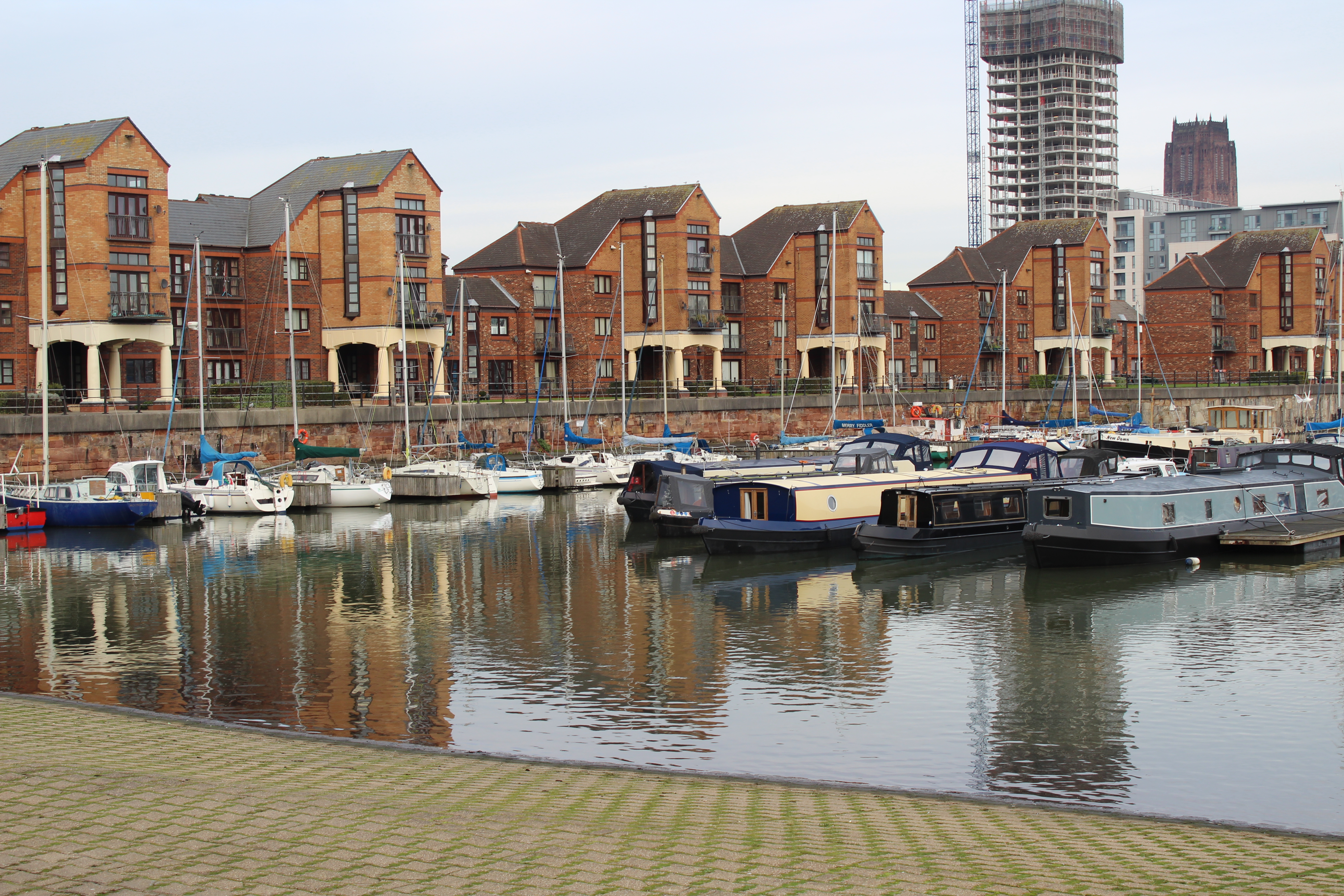

Location
- Location: Liverpool, United Kingdom
- Coordinates: 53.3914°N 2.9851°W
- OS grid: SJ345887

Details
- Owner: Canal & River Trust
- Opened: 1840
- Type: Wet dock
- Joins: Brunswick Dock; Queen's Dock
- Area: 8 acres (3.2 ha), 26 sq yd (22 m^{2}) (in 1858)
- Width at entrance: 70 ft 1 in (21.36 m) (in 1858)
- Quay length: 1,053 yd (963 m) (in 1858)

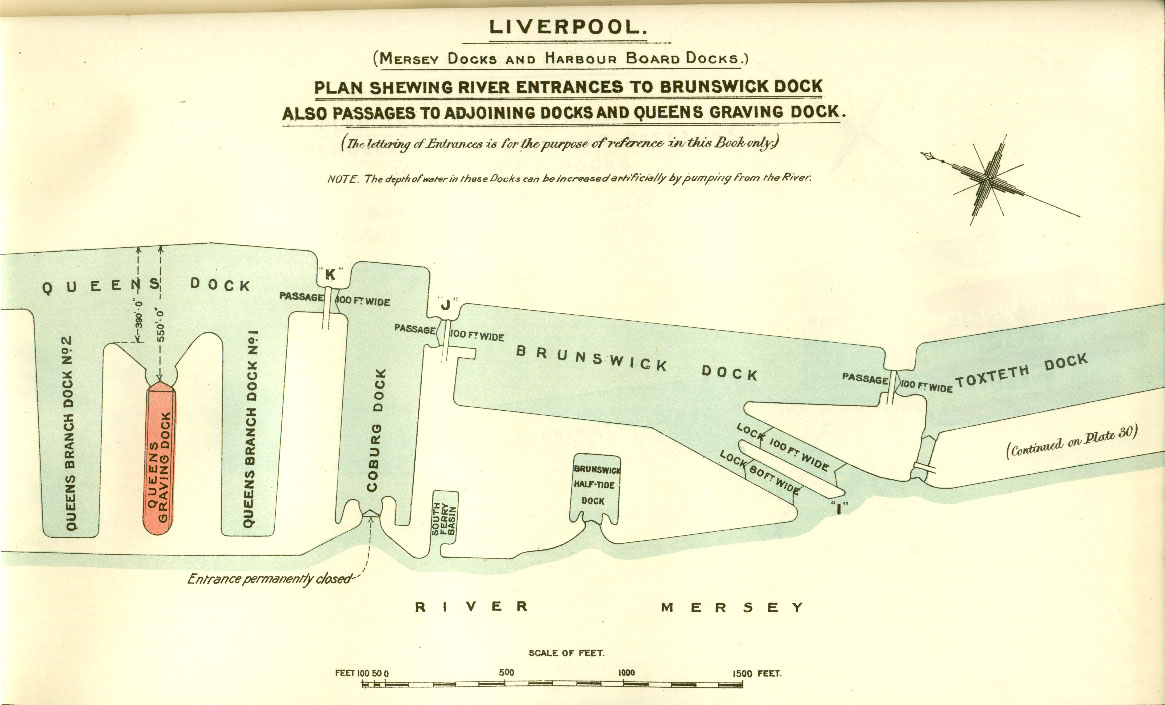
British Empire Dockyards and Ports, 1909

Coburg Dock is a dock on the River Mersey, in England, and part of the Port of Liverpool. It is situated in the southern dock system, connected to Queens Dock to the north, Brunswick Dock to the south.

== History ==
The Union Half Tide Basin and Brunswick Basin first existed on the site, which were built c.1817-23. Brunswick Basin was renamed as Coburg Dock in 1840, in honour of Prince Albert, and provided with a 70 ft (21 m)-wide river entrance. From 1842, the dock became Jesse Hartley's South Dockyard headquarters. Coburg Dock was enlarged in 1858, consuming the Union dock, and enlarged again in 1902. The river entrance fell into disuse and was subsequently sealed up. The dock was used as a repair berth and for grain discharge, having a 62,000 long tons (63,000 t) capacity grain silo. The dock closed in 1972. In 1986, the grain silo near the dock basin was demolished.

South Ferry Basin or 'The Cockle Hole', a small open basin to the south, was little known under its own name and often confused as being part of Coburg Dock.

== Present use ==
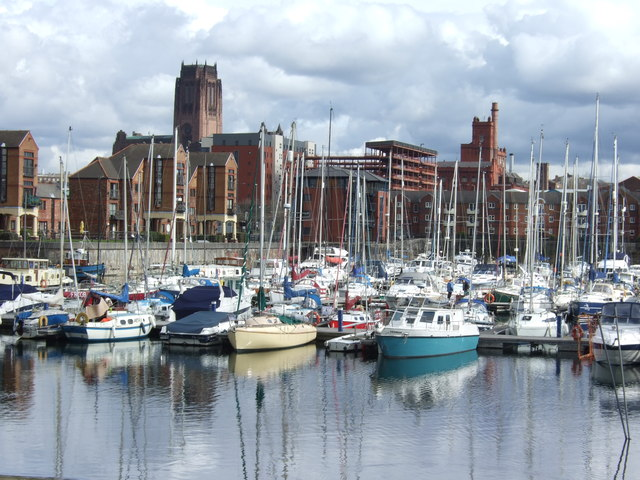
Liverpool Marina, Coburg Dock

This and the other docks in the southern system were owned by British Waterways, now transferred to the Canal & River Trust. Part of the dock is set aside for moorings within Liverpool Marina. Mariner's Wharf, on the north quayside, was built between 1989 and 1997.
