= Brunswick Dock =

Dock on the River Mersey, England

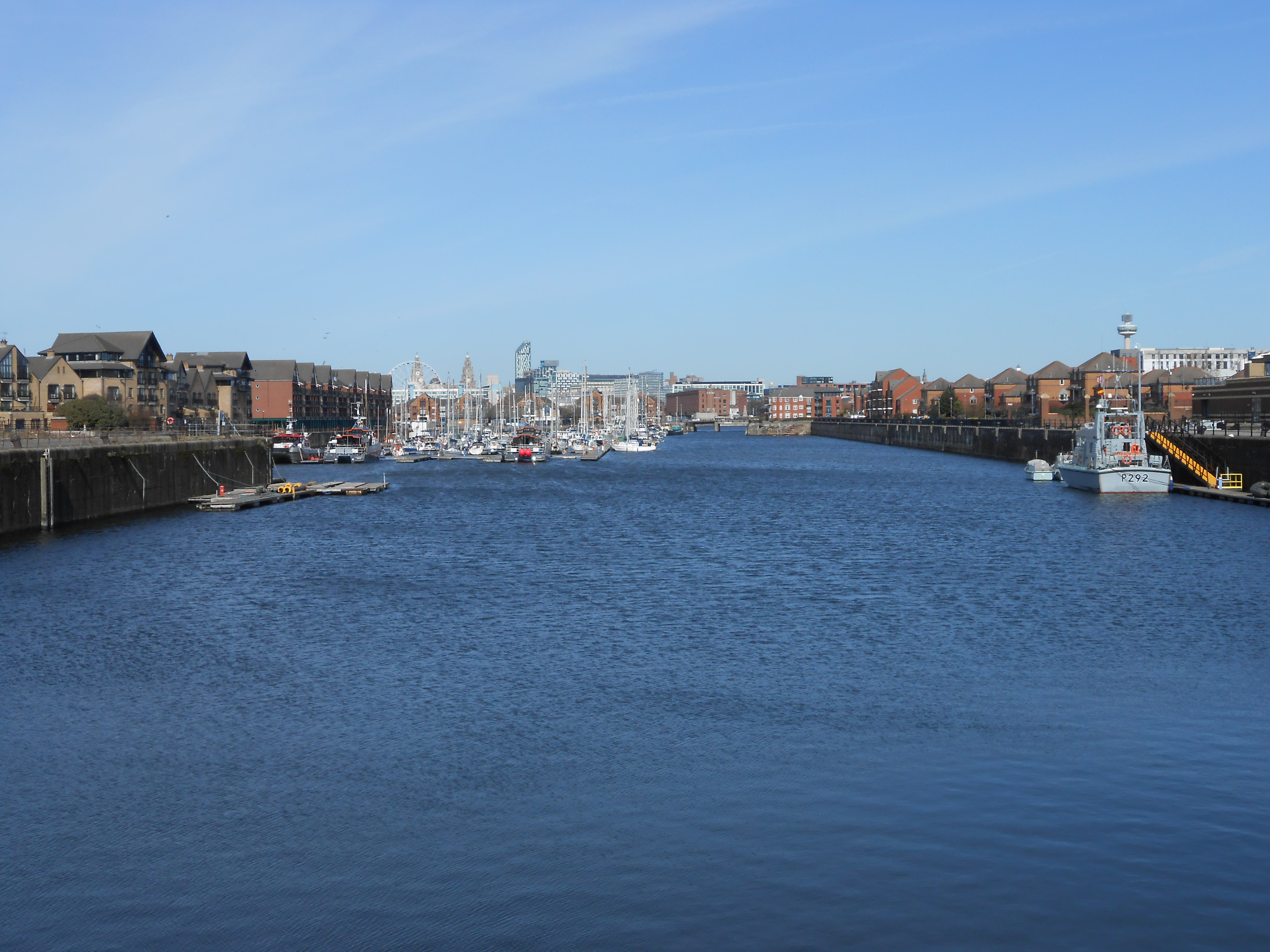
- Brunswick Dock

Location
- Location: Liverpool, United Kingdom
- Coordinates: 53.3888°N 2.9833°W
- OS grid: SJ347884

Details
- Owner: Canal & River Trust
- Opened: 1832
- Type: Wet dock
- Joins: River Mersey; Coburg Dock
- Area: 12 acres (4.9 ha), 3,010 sq yd (2,520 m^{2}) (in 1858)
- Width at entrance: 60 ft (18 m) (in 1858)
- Quay length: 1,086 yd (993 m) (in 1858)

Brunswick Dock is also the name of a dock in London, which became part of the East India Docks.

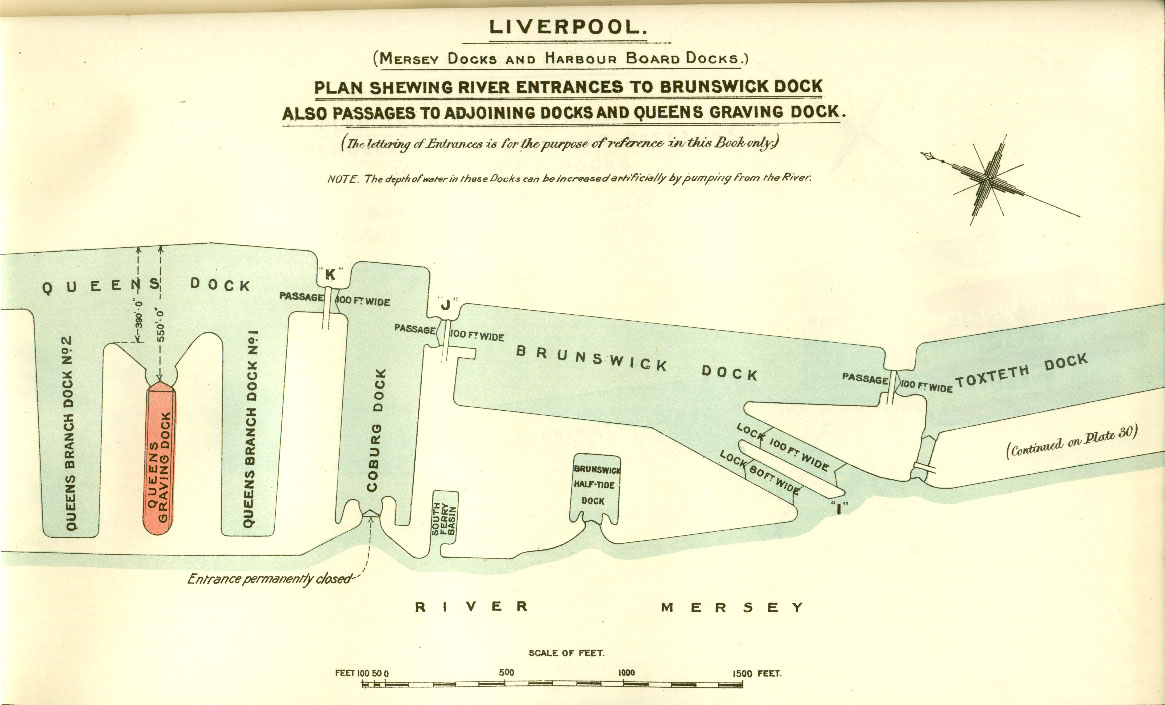
British Empire Dockyards and Ports, 1909

Brunswick Dock is a dock on the River Mersey, in England, and part of the Port of Liverpool. It is situated in the southern dock system, connected to Coburg Dock to the north, Toxteth Dock to the south.

== History ==
First suggested in 1809, the dock was built by Jesse Hartley between 1827 and 1832, when it opened, specifically for importing timber. The dock was Hartley's first. It consisted of two lock entrances from the river. In 1854, Cato, Miller & Company built ships at Brunswick Dock. The dock was rebuilt with a southern extension in 1905 by Anthony George Lyster. The dock closed in 1975, although one lock was reopened in 1987 for small watercraft.

== Present ==
The Royal Navy Headquarters for the North of England (RNHQ NE) is on Brunswick Dock, which includes the Royal Naval Reserve shore establishment HMS Eaglet. The Archer-class patrol vessels HMS Biter and HMS Charger are based in the dock. Due to tidal restrictions at Brunswick, however, the two ships spend most of their time at Langton Dock in the North dock system in order to enable them to carry out their University Royal Naval Unit training programs more effectively.

This and the other docks in the southern system are owned by the Canal & River Trust, with part of the dock set aside for moorings within Liverpool Marina.
