= Liverpool Marina =

Docks in Liverpool, England

Coordinates: 53.391°N 2.985°W

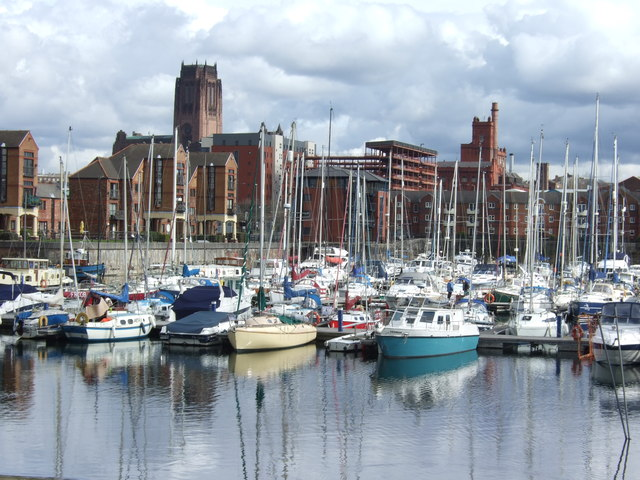
Liverpool Marina, Coburg Dock

Liverpool Marina is a Marina in Coburg Dock, Liverpool, Merseyside. It has 340 berths. It includes a venue called the Yacht Club and Restaurant. It is the home of Liverpool Yacht Club who have no affiliation with the marina.
