= Merseyside Development Corporation =

- Formation: 1981
- Dissolved: 1998
- Type: Development Corporation
- Headquarters: Liverpool
- Chair: Donald Forster
- Chief executive: Basil Bean

The Merseyside Development Corporation was a central government-appointed Development Corporation set up in 1981 by Margaret Thatcher's government to regenerate the Mersey docks of Liverpool, Bootle, Wallasey and Birkenhead.

== History ==
The corporation was established as part of an initiative by the future Deputy Prime Minister, Michael Heseltine, in 1981 during the First Thatcher ministry. Board members were directly appointed by the minister and overrode local authority planning controls to spend government money on infrastructure. This was a controversial measure in Labour strongholds such as East London, Merseyside and North East England.

Activities undertaken by the Corporation include the Liverpool International Garden Festival in 1984, and the redevelopment of the Albert Dock complex, which included the opening of Tate Liverpool and the Merseyside Maritime Museum. During its lifetime 7,600,000 square feet (710,000 m^{2}) of non-housing development and 486 housing units were built. Around 22,155 new jobs were created and some £698m of private finance was leveraged in. Circa 944 acres (3.82 km^{2}) of derelict land was reclaimed and 60 miles (97 km) of new road and footpaths put in place.

The chairman was Donald Forster, who had previously been Chairman of Warrington and Runcorn Development Corporation, and the first Chief Executive was Basil Bean, who had previously been general manager of the Northampton Development Corporation. The corporation was wound up in 1998.
