= History of Liverpool =

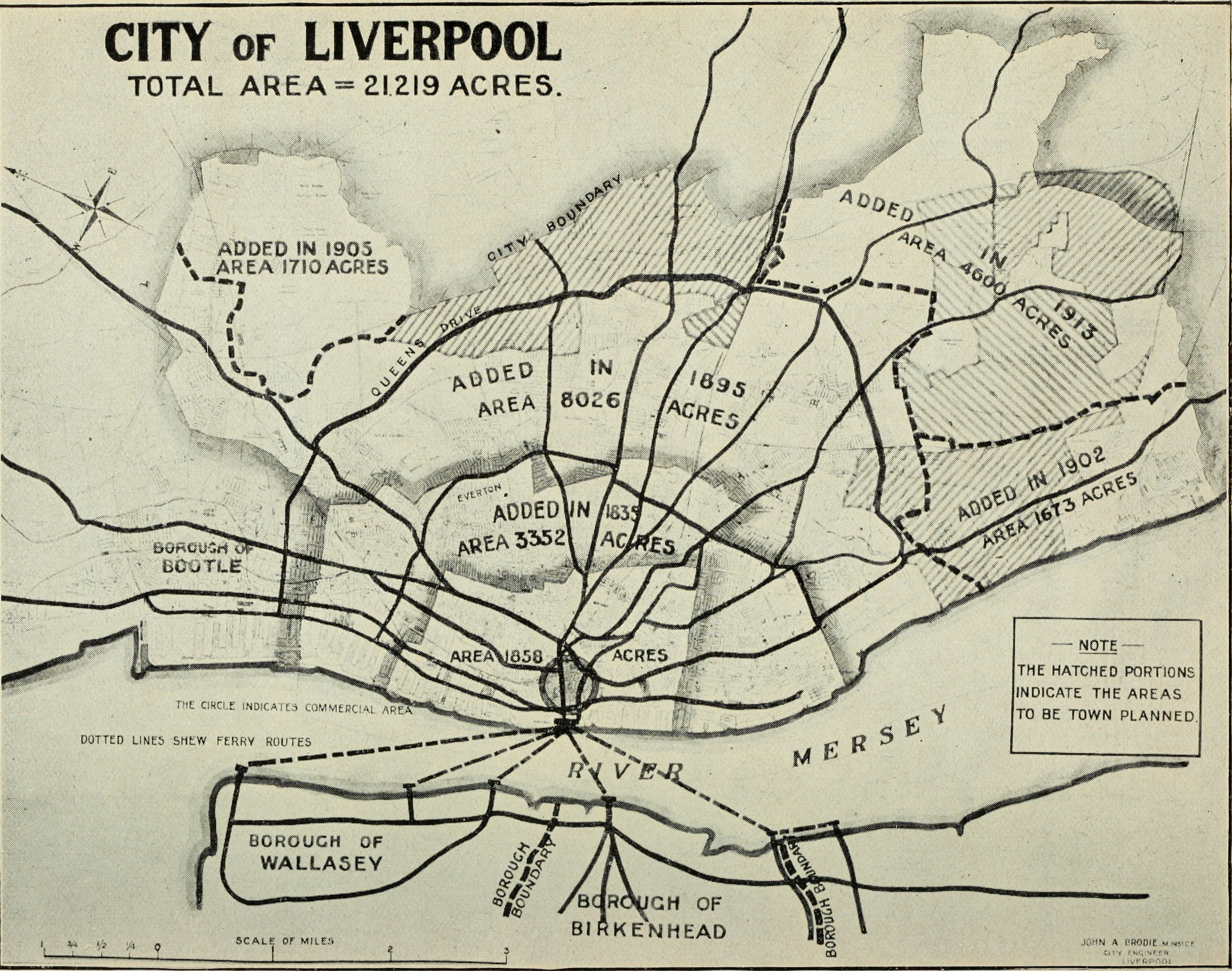
Expansions of Liverpool boundaries in 1835, 1895, 1902, 1905 and 1913

The history of Liverpool can be traced back to 1190 when the place was known as 'Liuerpul', possibly meaning a pool or creek with muddy water, though other origins of the name have been suggested. The borough was founded by royal charter in 1207 by King John, made up of only seven streets in the shape of the letter 'H'. Liverpool remained a small settlement until its trade with Ireland and coastal parts of England and Wales was overtaken by trade with Africa and the West Indies, which included the slave trade. The world's first commercial wet dock was opened in 1715 and Liverpool's expansion to become a major city continued over the next two centuries.

By the start of the nineteenth century, a large volume of trade was passing through Liverpool. In 1830, the Liverpool and Manchester Railway was opened. The population grew rapidly, especially with Irish migrants; by 1851, one quarter of the city's population was Irish-born. As growth continued, the city became known as "the second city of the Empire", and was also called "the New York of Europe". During the Second World War, the city was the centre for planning the crucial Battle of the Atlantic, and suffered a blitz second only to London's.

From the mid-twentieth century, Liverpool's docks and traditional manufacturing industries went into sharp decline, with the advent of containerisation making the city's docks obsolete. The unemployment rate in Liverpool rose to one of the highest in the UK. Over the same period, starting in the early 1960s, the city became internationally renowned for its culture, particularly as the centre of the "Merseybeat" sound which became synonymous with The Beatles. In recent years, Liverpool's economy has recovered, partly due to tourism as well as substantial investment in regeneration schemes. The city was the European Capital of Culture for 2008.

== Iron Age and Britons ==
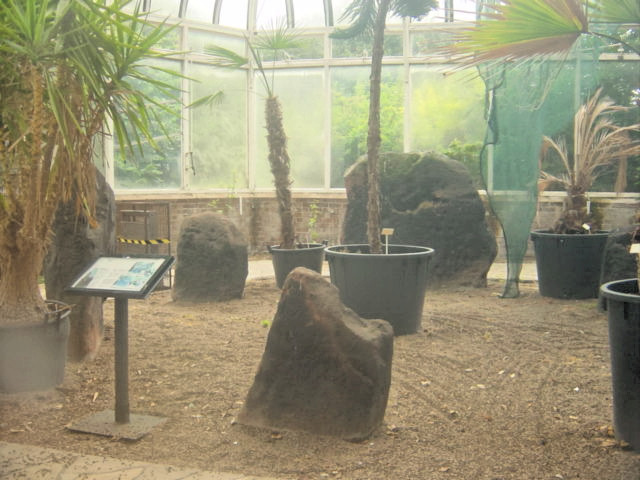
The ancient neolithic Calder Stones on display in the Harthill Greenhouses

In the Iron Age the area around modern-day Liverpool was sparsely populated, though there was a seaport at Meols. The Calderstones are thought to be part of an ancient stone circle and there is archaeological evidence for native Iron Age farmsteads at several sites in Irby, Halewood and Lathom. The region was inhabited by Brythonic tribes, the Setantii as well as nearby Cornovii and Deceangli.

== Romans ==
The area came under Roman influence in about 70 AD, with the northward advance to crush the druid resistance on Anglesey and to end the internal strife between the ruling family of Brigantes. The main Roman presence was at the fortress and settlement at Chester. According to Ptolemy, the Latin hydronym for the Mersey was Seteia Aestuarium, which derives from the Setantii tribe.

In 2007 evidence of a Roman tile works was found around the Tarbock Island area of the M62 and various Roman coins and jewellery have been found in the Liverpool area.

== Anglo-Saxons ==
After the withdrawal of Roman troops, land in the area continued to be farmed by native Britons. The Hen Ogledd (Old North) was subject to fighting among four medieval kingdoms: the Anglo-Saxon Kingdom of Mercia eventually defeated its rival Northumbria as well as the Celtic kingdoms of Gwynedd and Powys, with the Battle of Brunanburh perhaps taking place at nearby Bromborough. The settlements at Walton (Wealas tun meaning 'farmstead of the Wealas'), and Wallasey (Wealas-eg meaning 'island of the Wealas') were named at this time with Wealas being Old English for 'foreigner', referring to the native Celtic and Romanized inhabitants.

== Vikings ==
The pseudo-historical Fragmentary Annals of Ireland appear to record the Norse settlement of the Wirral in their account of the immigration of Ingimundr near Chester. This Irish source places this settlement in the aftermath of the expulsion of the Vikings from Dublin in 902 and an unsuccessful attempt to settle on Anglesey soon afterwards. Following these setbacks, Ingimundr is stated to have settled near Chester with the consent of Æthelflæd, co-ruler of Mercia. The Norse settlers eventually joined up with another group of Viking settlers who populated west Lancashire, and for a time had an independent Viking mini-state, with Viking placenames evident all over Merseyside.

Viking placenames include the suffix -by from Old Norse byr meaning village or farm, as found in Kirkby, West Kirby, Crosby, Formby, West Derby, Roby, Frankby, Greasby, Irby, Raby. The -teth suffix from stathir meaning homestead as in Toxteth and Croxteth. The -dale suffix comes from dalr meaning valley as found in Kirkdale, Ainsdale, Birkdale. The prefix hale from halh meaning river meadow as found in Hale Bank and Halewood. The word Meols and suffix -mere come from melr meaning sandbank as in Meols and Tranmere. The Norse name Thorsteinn is shown in Thursaston. The thing-vollr in Norse meaning assembly field is found in Thingwall place names on both sides of the Mersey in West Derby and Wirral.

== Norman ==
In 1086, the Domesday Book survey lists Roger de Poitou as the South Lancashire tenant-in-chief for Inter Ripam et Mersam lands between the Ribble and Mersey rivers, in the West Derby Hundred and, at the time, the northern part of Cheshire. The Wirral settlements are administered as the Hundred of Wilaveston from the village of Willaston.

Liverpool itself is not listed in the Domesday Book but there is a large settlement listed at West Derby (Derbei). Other settlements are named in the West Derby Hundred including Bootle (Boltelai), Kirkdale (Circhdele), Walton (Waletone), Toxteth (Stochestede), Smithdown (Esmidune), Wavertree (Wauretreu), Childwall (Cildeuuelle), Allerton (Alretune), Little and Much Woolton (Uluentune), (Ulletone), Speke (Spec), Tarbock (Tarboc), Roby (Rabil), Huyton (Hitune), Knowsley (Chenulveslei), Kirkby (Cherchebi), Melling (Melinge), Maghull (Magele), Lydiate (Leidte), Sefton (Sextune), Thornton (Torentun), Litherland (Liderlant), Crosby (Crosebi), Formby (Fornebei), Ravenmeols (Mele), Little Altcar (Acrer), Ainsdale (Einulvesdel), North Meols (Otegrimele).

== Origins of the name ==
The name comes from the Old English liver, meaning thick or muddy, and pol, meaning a pool or creek, and is first recorded around 1190 as Liuerpul. According to the Cambridge Dictionary of English Place-Names, "The original reference was to a pool or tidal creek now filled up into which two streams drained". The adjective Liverpudlian is first recorded in 1833.

== Origins of the town ==
W. Ferguson Irvine's conjectural plan of Liverpool's original 7 streets

West Derby Castle shown where it used to stand (circa 1200)

Although a small motte and bailey castle had earlier been built at West Derby, the origins of the city of Liverpool are usually dated from 28 August 1207, when letters patent were issued by King John advertising the establishment of a new borough, "Livpul", and inviting settlers to come and take up holdings there. It is thought that the King wanted a port in the district that was free from the control of the Earl of Chester. Initially it served as a dispatch point for troops sent to Ireland, soon after the building around 1235 of Liverpool Castle, which was removed in 1726. St Nicholas Church was built by 1257, originally as a chapel within the parish of Walton-on-the-Hill. In the 13th century Liverpool as an area consisted of just seven streets.

With the formation of a market on the site of the later town hall, Liverpool became established as a small fishing and farming community administered by burgesses and, slightly later, a mayor. There was probably some coastal trade around the Irish Sea and there were occasional ferries across the Mersey. However for several centuries it remained a small and relatively unimportant settlement, with a population of no more than 1,000 in the mid 14th century. By the early 15th century a period of economic decline set in and the county gentry increased their power over the town, the Stanley family fortifying their house by building Stanley Tower on Water Street. This was a catalyst for a feud between the Stanley and Molyneux families since the Molyneux family had permission to live at the nearby Liverpool Castle at that time. The resulting rivalry nearly spilled into a riot in 1424. In the middle of the 16th century the population of Liverpool had fallen to around 600 and the port was regarded as subordinate to Chester until the 1650s.

== Elizabethan era and the Civil War ==
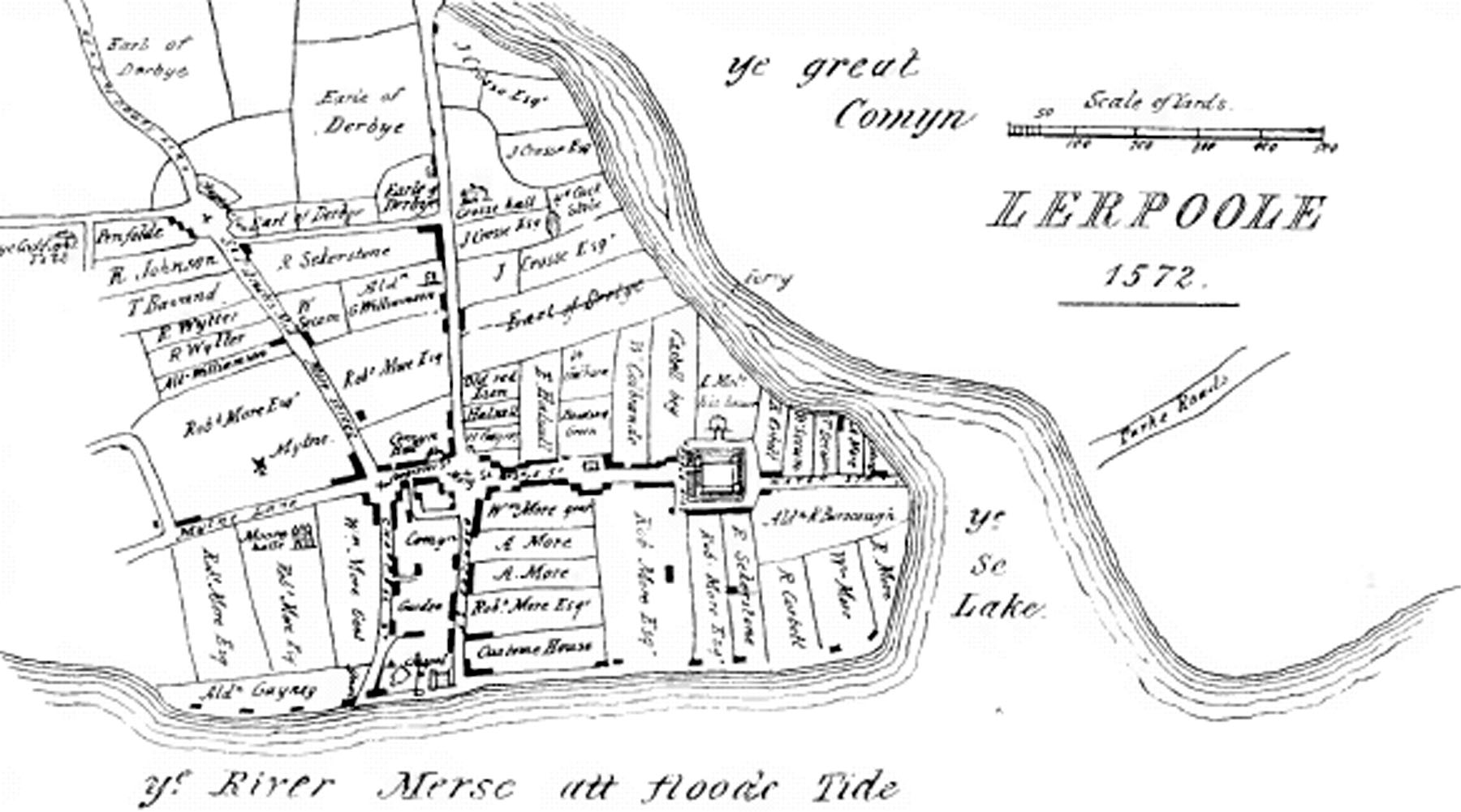
Liverpool in 1572

In 1571 the people of Liverpool sent a memorial to Queen Elizabeth I, praying relief from a subsidy which they thought themselves unable to bear, wherein they styled themselves "her majesty's poor decayed town of Liverpool". Some time towards the close of this reign, Henry Stanley, 4th Earl of Derby, on his way to the Isle of Man, stayed at his house, the Tower; at which the corporation erected a handsome hall or seat for him in the church, where he honoured them several times with his presence.

By the end of the sixteenth century, the town began to be able to take advantage of economic revival and the silting of the River Dee to win trade, mainly from Chester, to Ireland, the Isle of Man and elsewhere. In 1626, King Charles I gave the town a new and improved charter.

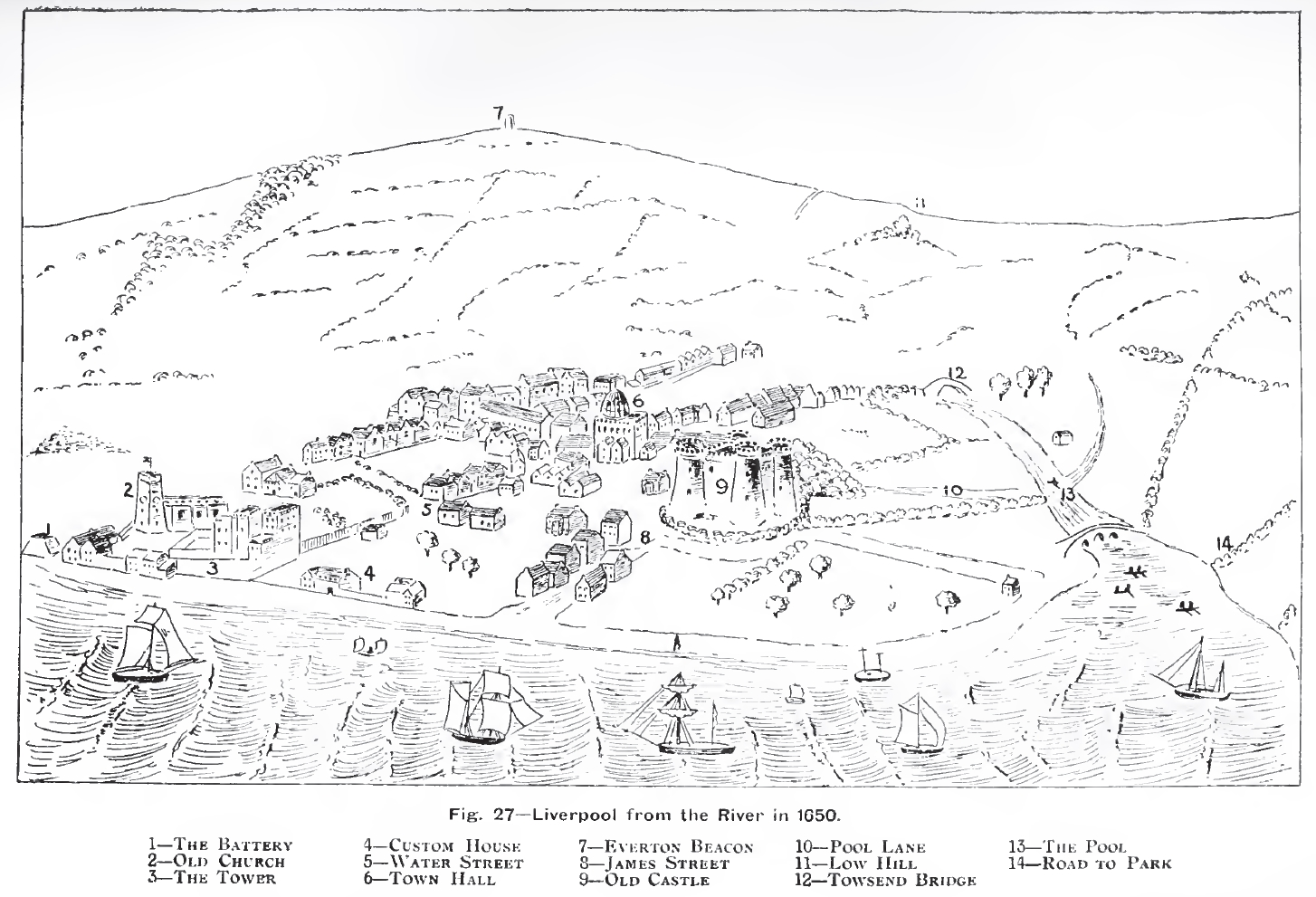
Liverpool in 1650

During the English Civil War there were three sieges of Liverpool. After the Roundheads captured Liverpool in 1643, a second siege took place in June 1644 led by Prince Rupert of the Rhine who arrived in Liverpool with 10,000 men in an attempt to capture Liverpool Castle for the King. He camped in Everton during the siege and he is remembered in the area through placenames and inspired the nickname of 'Prince Rupert's Tower' for the Everton Lock-Up that was built over a century later in the area (this small jail is also depicted on the Everton Football Club badge). To defend the town the Roundheads dug a trench around much of the town. Prince Rupert succeeded in capturing the town and the castle but later that same year the Roundheads recaptured Liverpool.

== Transatlantic trade ==
The first cargo from the Americas was recorded in 1648. The development of the town accelerated after the Restoration of 1660, with the growth of trade with America and the West Indies. From that time may be traced the rapid progress of population and commerce, until Liverpool had become the second metropolis of Great Britain. Initially, cloth, coal and salt from Lancashire and Cheshire were exchanged for sugar and tobacco; the town's first sugar refinery was established in 1667.

In 1699 Liverpool was made a parish on its own by Act of Parliament, separate from that of Walton-on-the-Hill, with two parish churches. At the same time it gained separate customs authority from Chester.

== Slave trade, privateering ==
In 1699 the first known slave ship to sail from Liverpool departed, its name and number of victims unknown. The last recorded slaving voyage out of Liverpool was in 1862, of a total of 4,973 such voyages. One example is the Liverpool Merchant that set sail for Africa on 3 October 1699, the very same year that Liverpool had been granted status as an independent parish. It arrived in Barbados with a 'cargo' of 220 Africans, returning to Liverpool on 18 September 1700. By the close of the 18th century 40% of the world's, and 80% of Britain's activity in the Atlantic slave trade was accounted for by slave ships that voyaged from the docks at Liverpool. In the peak year of 1799, ships sailing from Liverpool carried over 45,000 enslaved people from Africa.

Liverpool merchants such as Foster Cunliffe and his apprentice William Bulkeley co-owned voyages for slaves, for Greenland whaling, and, especially during the Seven Years' War, privateering. They traded also in tobacco and other commodities. James Stonehouse recalled his father's ship being fitted out: "I was often taken on board. In her hold were long shelves, with ring bolts in rows in several places. I used to run along these shelves little thinking of what dreadful scenes would be enacted upon them. The fact is that [she] was destined for the African trade, in which she made many successful voyages. In 1779, however, she was converted into a privateer. My father, at the present time, would not perhaps be thought very respectable; but I assure you that he was so considered in those days. So many people in Liverpool were... "tarred with the same brush" that these occupations were... not at all regarded as derogatory."

Vast profits transformed Liverpool into one of Britain's foremost cities. Liverpool became a financial centre, rivaled by Bristol, another slaving port, and exceeded only by London. The first commercial wet dock in the world was built in Liverpool and completed in 1715, with a capacity of 100 ships. The commercial growth led to the opening of the Consulate of the United States in Liverpool in 1790, its first consulate anywhere in the world, and to many other social changes: "As a young boy, I have seen it ranked only as a third-class seaport. Its streets tortuous and narrow, with pavements in the middle, skirted by mud or dirt as the season happened. The sidewalks rough with sharp-pointed stones, that made it misery to walk upon them. I have seen houses, with little low rooms, suffice for the dwelling of the merchant or well-to-do trader, the first being content to live in Water-St. or Oldhall-St., while the latter had no idea of leaving his little shop, with its bay or square window, to take care of itself at night... The most enlightened of its inhabitants, at that time, could not boast of much intelligence, while [the] lower orders were plunged in the deepest vice, ignorance, and brutality... so barbarous were they in their amusements, bullbaiting and cock and dog fightings, and pugilistic encounters. What could we expect when we opened no book to the young... deriving our prosperity from two great sources - the slave trade and privateering... Swarming with sailormen flushed with prize money, was it not likely that the inhabitants generally would take a tone from what they daily beheld and quietly countenanced?...

As a man, I have seen the old narrow streets widening – the old houses crumbling... and the sea influence recede before improvement, education and enlightenment of all sorts. The three-bottle and punch drinking man is the exception now, and not the rule of the table."

=== Liverpool politicians and slavery ===
Richard Pennant was returned unopposed as one of the two Members of Parliament for Liverpool at a by-election in 1767. He then won two successive general elections, in 1768 and 1774. He was defeated in 1780 general election, when Bamber Gascoyne (the younger) was returned instead. Pennant was given an Irish peerage, becoming Lord Penrhyn. He was returned as an MP for Liverpool in the 1784 general election. Between 1784 and 1790, when he stood down and was replaced by Banastre Tarleton, Penrhyn is reported to have made more than thirty speeches, all in vigorous defence of Liverpool trade or the West Indies. From 1788 to 1807, he was also Chairman of the London Society of West India Planters and Merchants. In May 1788, Penrhyn and Bamber Gascoyne (the younger), were the only two Members who ventured to justify the slave trade. Penrhyn spoke frequently in defence of the slave trade 'denying the facts advanced, appealing to the prudence and policy of the House against their compassion'. On 12 May 1789 he told the House that 'if they passed the vote of abolition they actually struck at seventy millions of property, they ruined the colonies, and by destroying an essential nursery of seamen, gave up the dominion of the sea at a single glance'. Bamber Gascoyne continued as a Liverpool MP until 1796.

Banastre Tarleton succeeded Lord Penrhyn as MP in 1790, and apart from one year, remained as an MP for Liverpool until 1812. He was a frequent speaker in the House of Commons, 'spirited and animated', in debate. In 1791 he visited Paris and was barred from the Jacobin Club because of his consistent and outspoken defence of the slave trade. His rhetoric was versatile; in 1794 he opposed William Wilberforce's bid to veto the export of slaves to foreign countries as an attack on private property. In 1796 he thwarted a further bid to abolish the slave trade and went on to thwart the slave carrying bill. In 1803 his opposition to abolition of the slave trade was based on the danger from Napoleon, adding in 1805 that Liverpool's growth and prosperity depended on the trade. By 1806 he believed that the United States would benefit more from abolition, and he 'was sorry to observe that ministers were much more active in injuring the trade of the country than in providing for its defence'.

Even in Liverpool, abolitionist sentiment was expressed. The Liverpool-born politician William Roscoe was member for Liverpool in 1806–1807, and was able to vote for the abolition of the slave trade in 1807. This legislation imposed fines that did little to deter slave trade participants; 29 avowed slaving voyages left Liverpool in 1808, but none in 1809, two in 1810, and two more in 1811. In 1811 Henry Brougham introduced the Slave Trade Felony Act 1811 which made slave traders liable to effective penalties including penal transportation for up to fourteen years. Thereafter, though the trade continued in illicit forms, only one more slaving voyage, in 1862, is recorded from Liverpool. Many merchants managed to ignore the laws and continued to deal in slave trafficking, supplying the markets that remained open in Brazil and elsewhere.

Slavery in British colonies was finally abolished in 1833, replaced by "apprenticeships", which ran until 1838 when they were abolished as well.

== Industrial revolution and commercial expansion ==
19th Century Liverpool
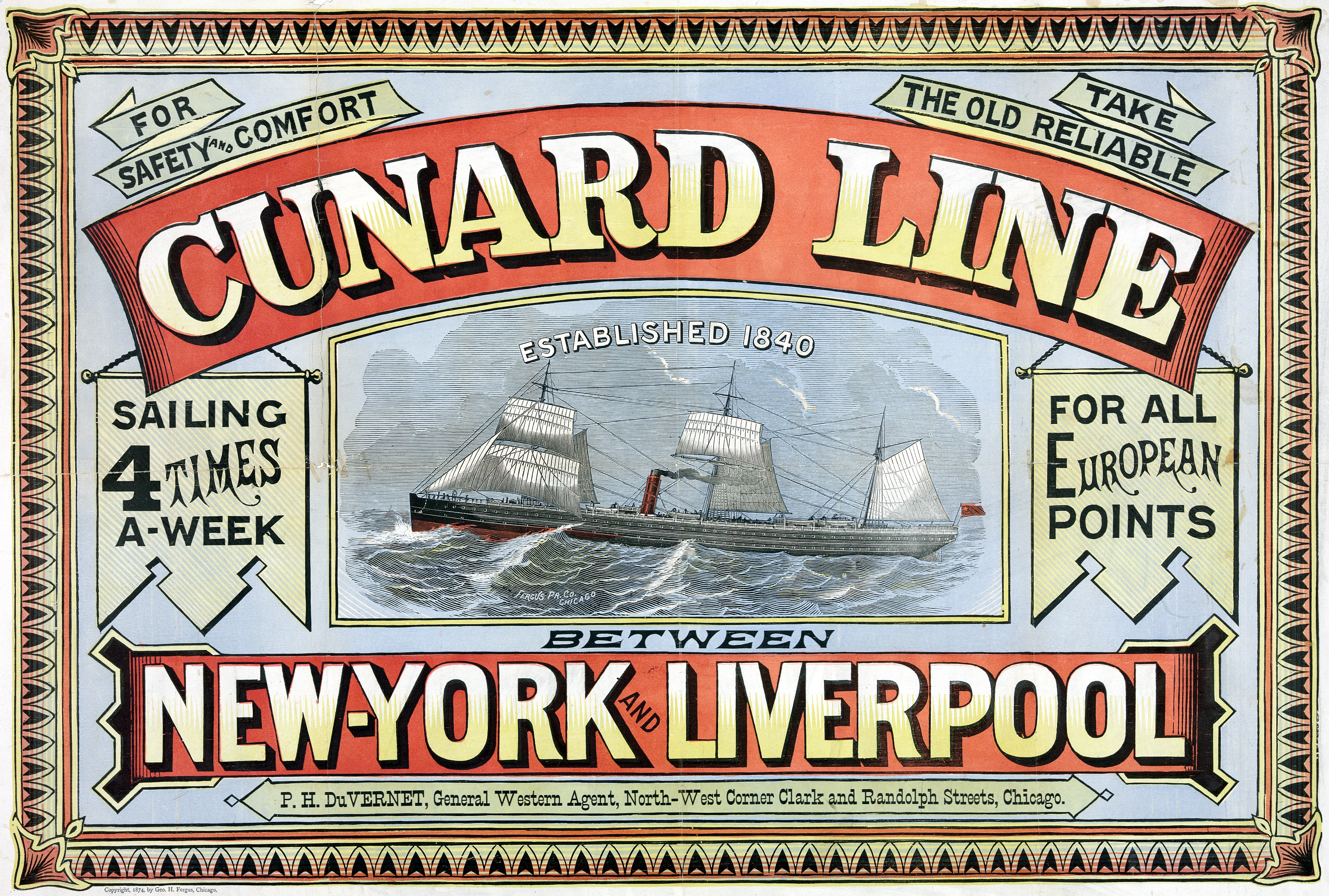
Cunard Line est. 1840, poster 1875

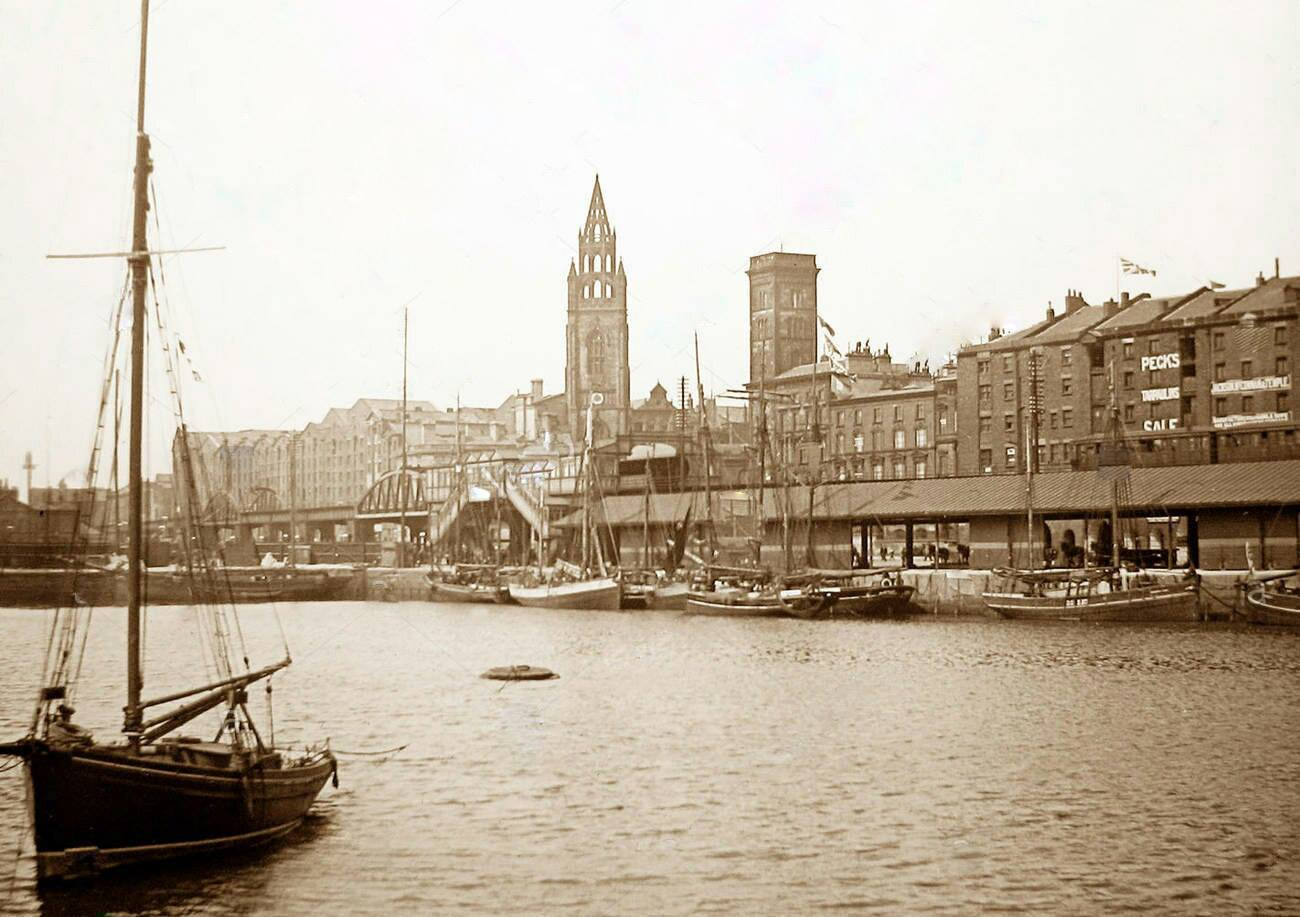
George's Dock opened 1771, closed 1899, photo 1897

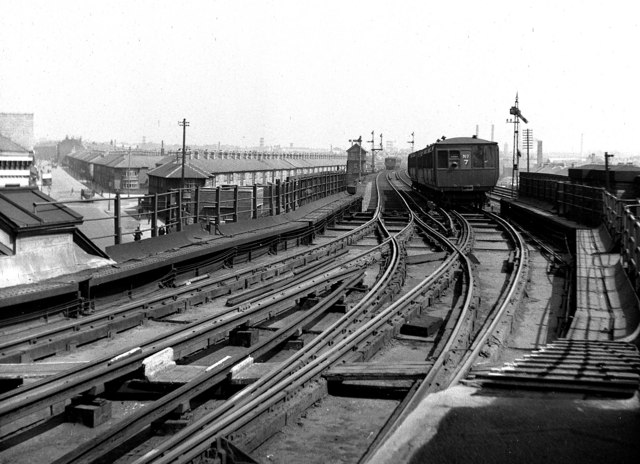
Liverpool Overhead Railway Seaforth Sands railway station opened 1894, railway opened 1893, photo 1951

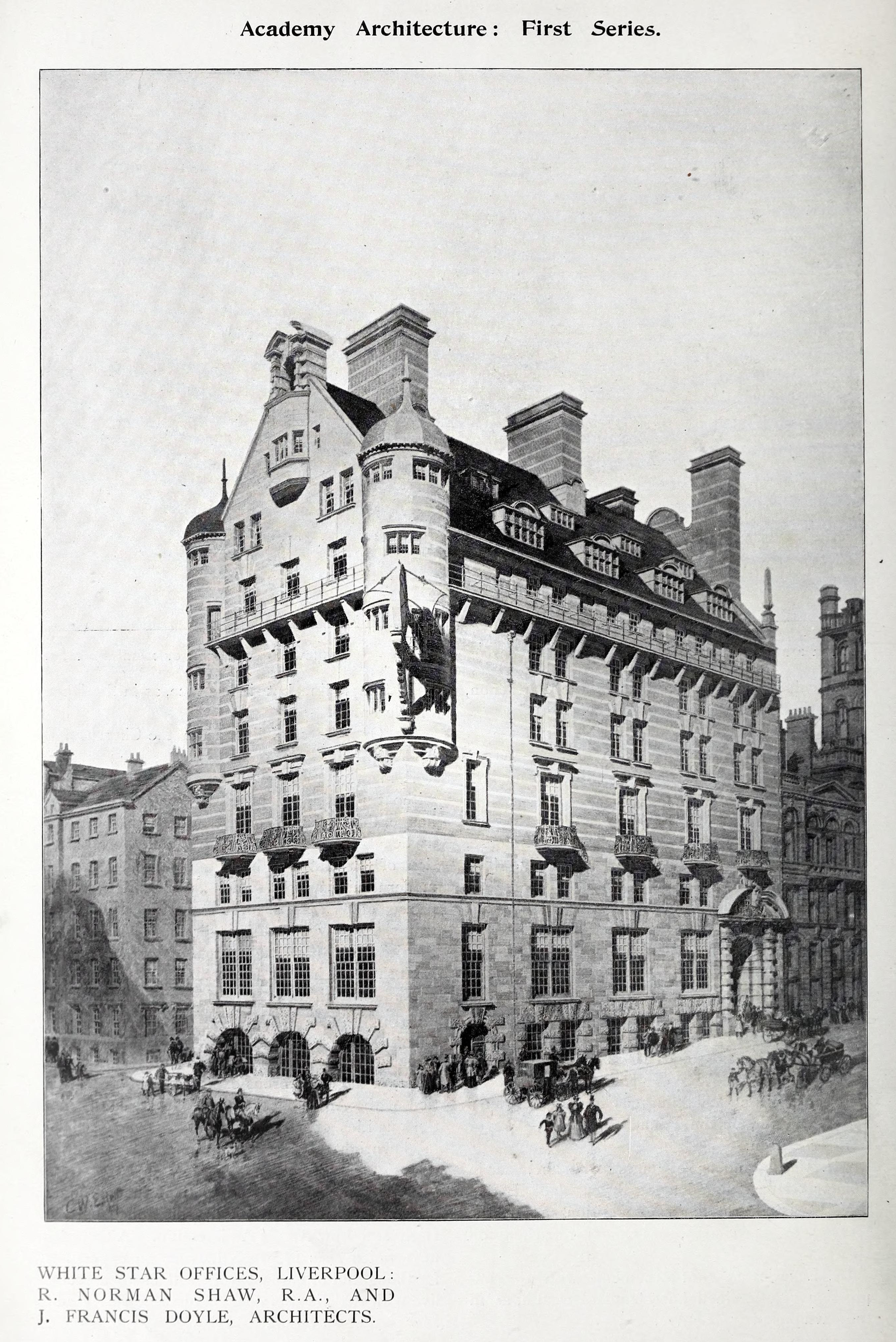
White Star Line offices, 1890s

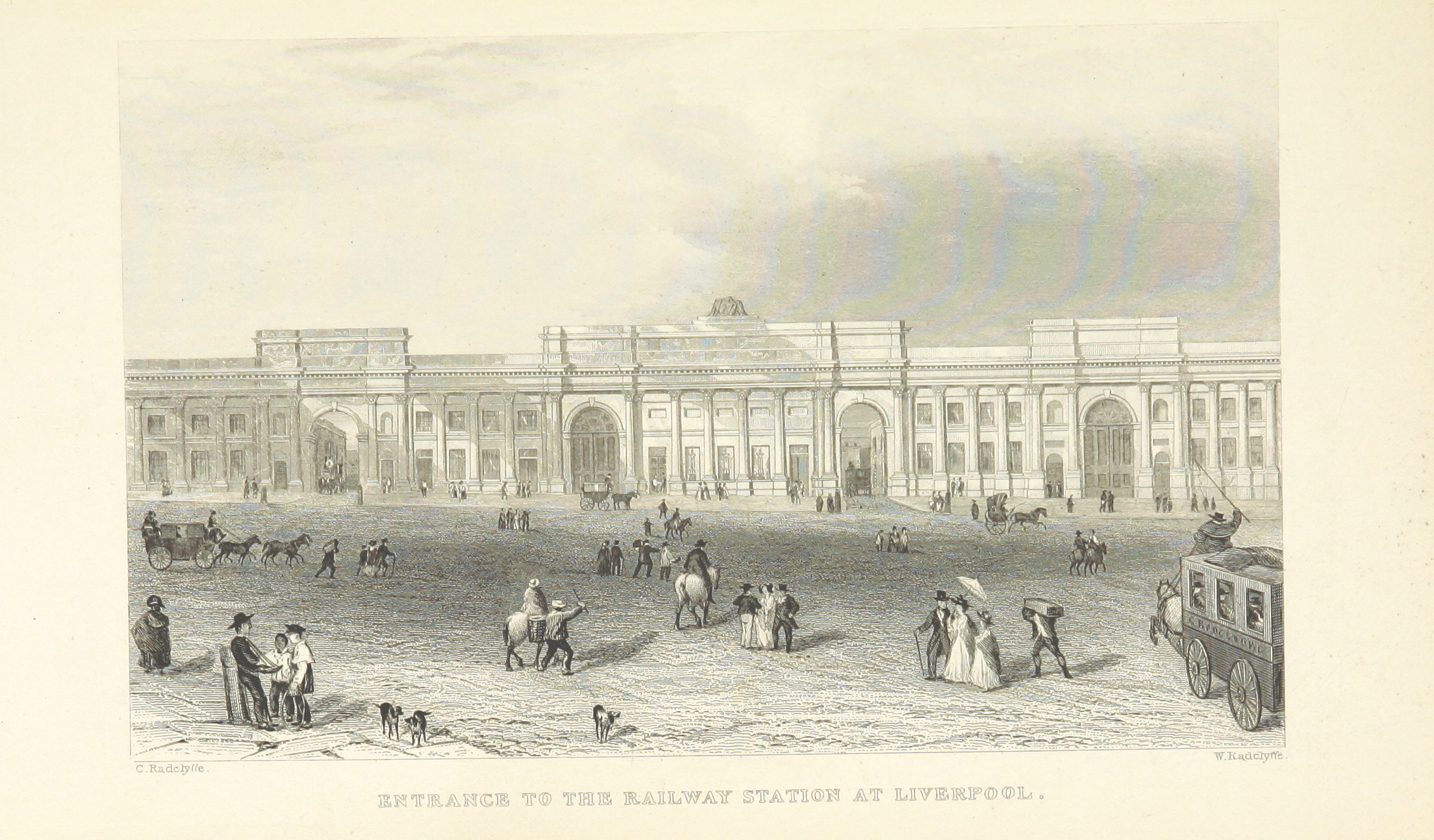
Liverpool Lime Street Station opening 1839

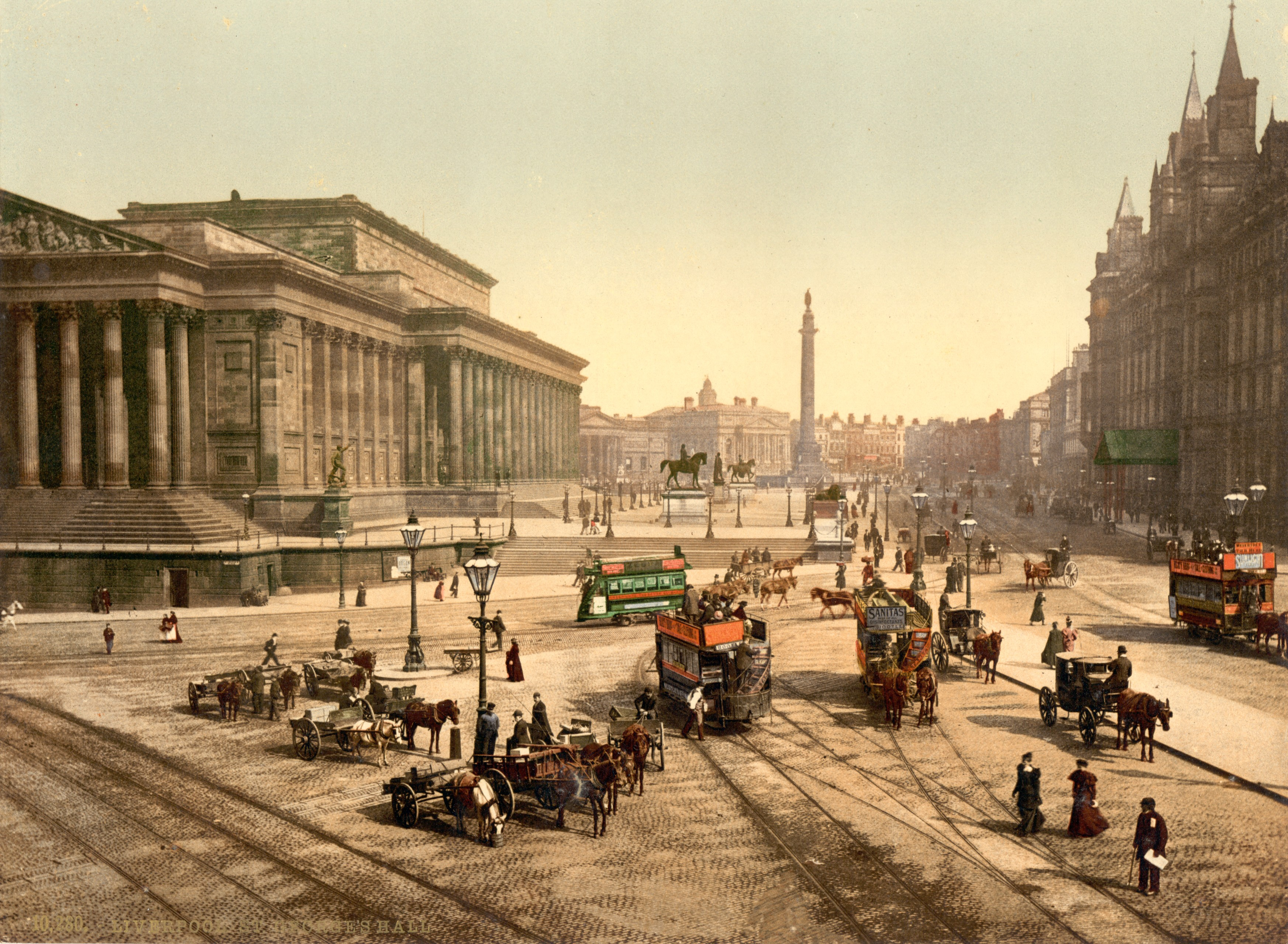
Colourised photo taken in the 1890s (note the partial view of the lost tympanum)

The dock system in 1832

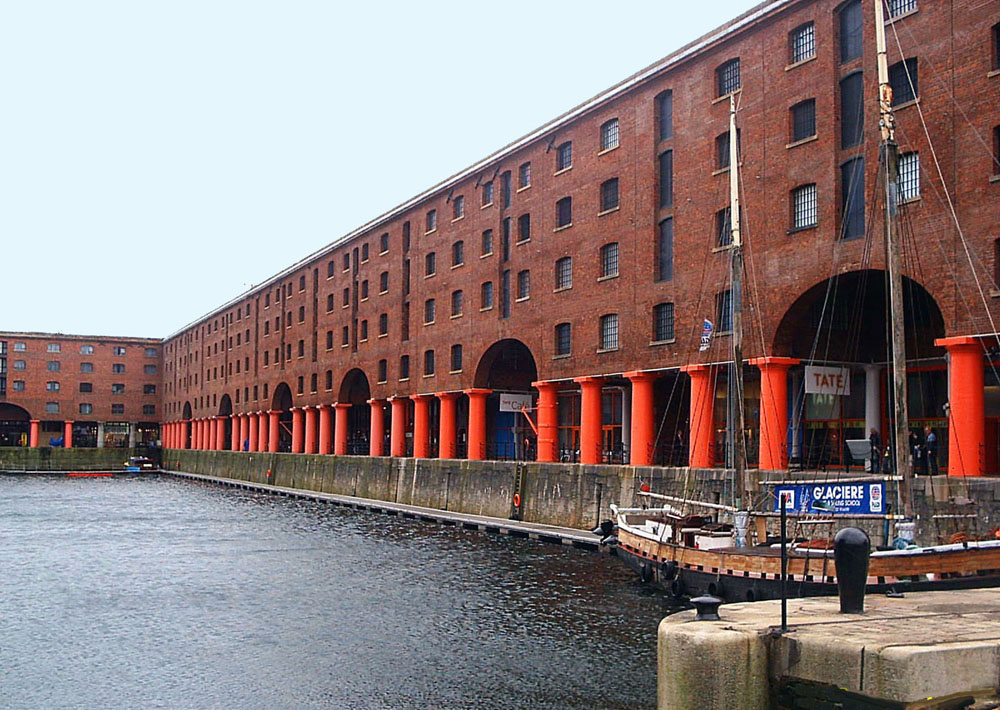
Albert Dock

The international trade of the town continued to grow. While this did include slave trading, it encompassed a wide range of commodities. In particular, cotton, which Liverpool became the leading world market. From Liverpool, the textile mills of Manchester and Lancashire were supplied.

During the eighteenth century the town's population grew from some 6,000 to 80,000, and its land and water communications with its hinterland and other northern cities steadily improved. Liverpool was first linked by canal to Manchester in 1721, the St. Helens coalfield in 1755, and Leeds in 1816. In 1830, Liverpool became home to the world's first inter-urban rail link to another city, Manchester, through the Liverpool and Manchester Railway and the maiden journey of Stephenson's The Rocket.

Liverpool's importance was such that it was home to a number of world firsts. This included the world's first fully electrically powered overhead railway, the Liverpool Overhead Railway. It opened in 1893, predating more famous systems subsequently constructed in New York City and Chicago.

The urban area grew rapidly from the 18th century onwards. The Bluecoat Hospital for poor children was established in 1718. With the demolition of the castle in 1726, only St Nicholas Church and the historic street plan – with Castle Street as the spine of the original settlement and Paradise Street following the line of the Pool – remained to reflect the town's mediaeval origins. The Town Hall, with a covered exchange for merchants designed by architect John Wood, was built in 1754, and the first office buildings, including the Corn Exchange, were opened in 1808.

Throughout the 19th century Liverpool's trade and its population continued to expand rapidly. Growth in the cotton trade was accompanied by the development of strong trading links with India and the Far East, following the ending of the Honourable East India Company's monopoly in 1813. More than 140 acres (0.57 km^{2}) of new docks, with 10 miles (16 km) of quay space, were opened between 1824 and 1858. In 1848, Liverpool's public abattoir, in the town centre, was considered the best in England. However, by 1900 it was said to be inferior to a private slaughterhouse.

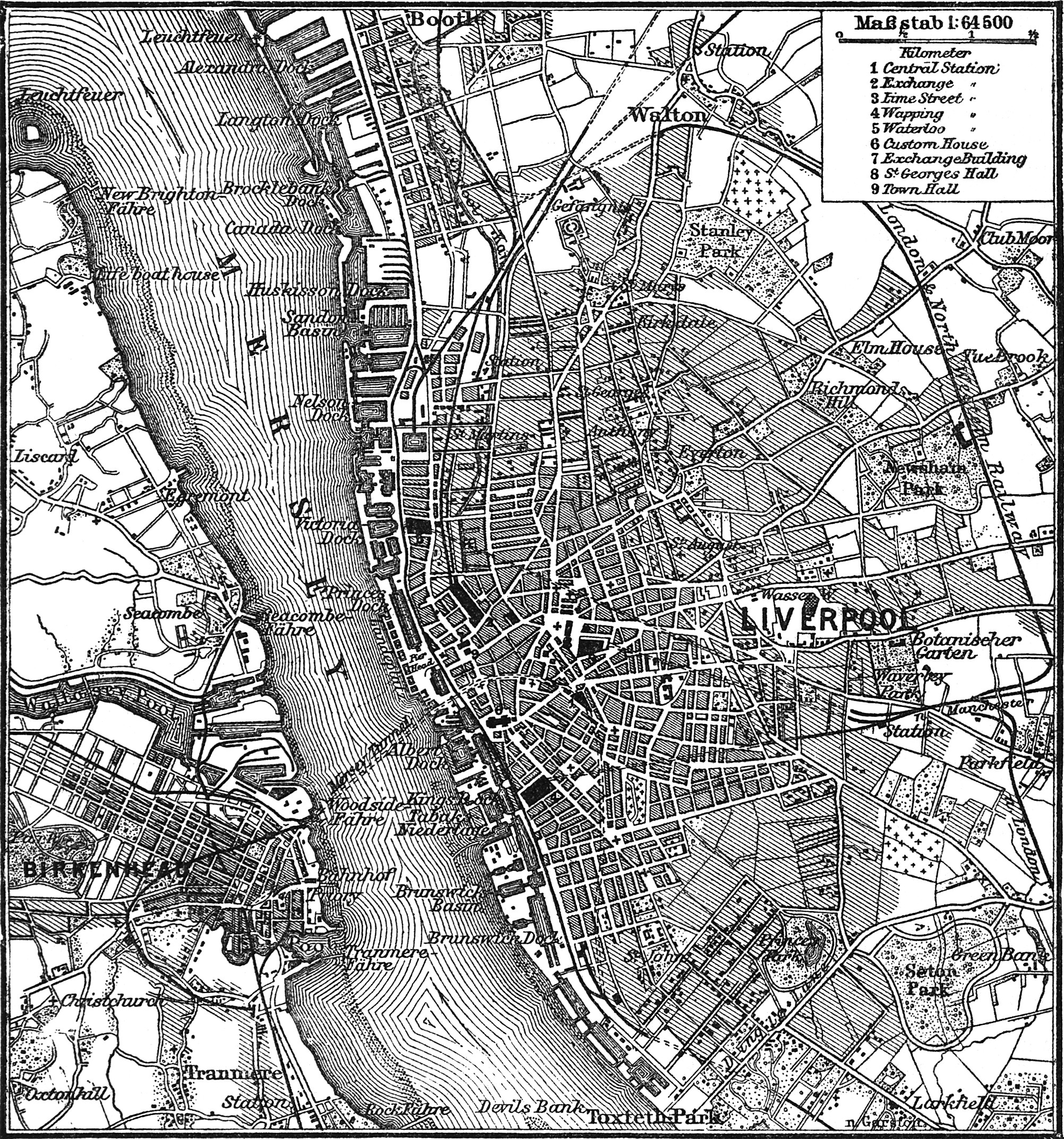
Map of Liverpool from 1890

Between 1845 and 1849, due to the Great Famine, there was an influx of Irish people into Liverpool. Almost 300,000 arrived in 1847, and by 1851 approximately 25 per cent of the town's population was Irish-born. The Irish influence is reflected in the unique place Liverpool occupies in UK and Irish political history, being the only local outside Ireland to elect a member of parliament from the Irish Parliamentary Party to the British parliament in Westminster. T.P. O'Connor represented the constituency of Liverpool Scotland from 1885 to 1929.

As the town became a leading port of the British Empire, a number of major buildings were constructed. These included St George's Hall (1854) and Lime Street Station. The Grand National steeplechase was first run at Aintree in 1837.

Between 1851 and 1911, Liverpool attracted at least 20,000 people from Wales each decade, peaking in the 1880s. One of the first Welsh-language journals, Yr Amserau, was founded in Liverpool by William Rees (Gwilym Hiraethog), and more than 50 Welsh chapels were constructed.

Early regular scheduled Liverpool transatlantic passenger travel began in the 1810s, with American lines such as Black Ball Line (trans-Atlantic packet) and Collins Line. In the 1840s, Liverpool-based companies' emerged that included Cunard Line and White Star Line.

When the American Civil War broke out, Liverpool became a hotbed of intrigue, and Confederate agent James Dunwoody Bulloch set up a base of operations there. Given the crucial place cotton held in the town's economy, Liverpool became "the most pro-Confederate place in the world outside the Confederacy itself" per the historian Sven Beckert. The Confederate Navy ship, the CSS Alabama, was built at Birkenhead on the Mersey, and the CSS Shenandoah surrendered there (being the final surrender at the end of the war). The city was also the center of Confederate purchasing war materiel, including arms and ammunition, uniforms, and naval supplies to be smuggled by British blockade runners to the South.

Liverpool was granted city status in 1880 and the following year its university was established. By 1901, the city's population had grown to over 700,000, and its boundaries had expanded to include Kirkdale, Everton, Walton, West Derby (in 1835 and 1895), Toxteth and Garston.

== 20th century ==
=== 1900-1938 ===
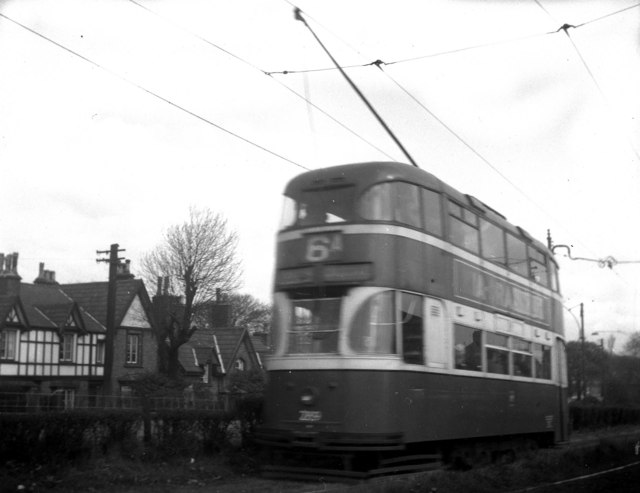
By 1957, the once-great Liverpool tramway system had been reduced to just two routes, the 6A to Bowring Park and the 40 to Page Moss Avenue. These routes finally closed in September. All were in a run-down and dilapidated condition, sad to see. Here is a 'Baby Grand' 4-wheel tram on the Bowring Park route.

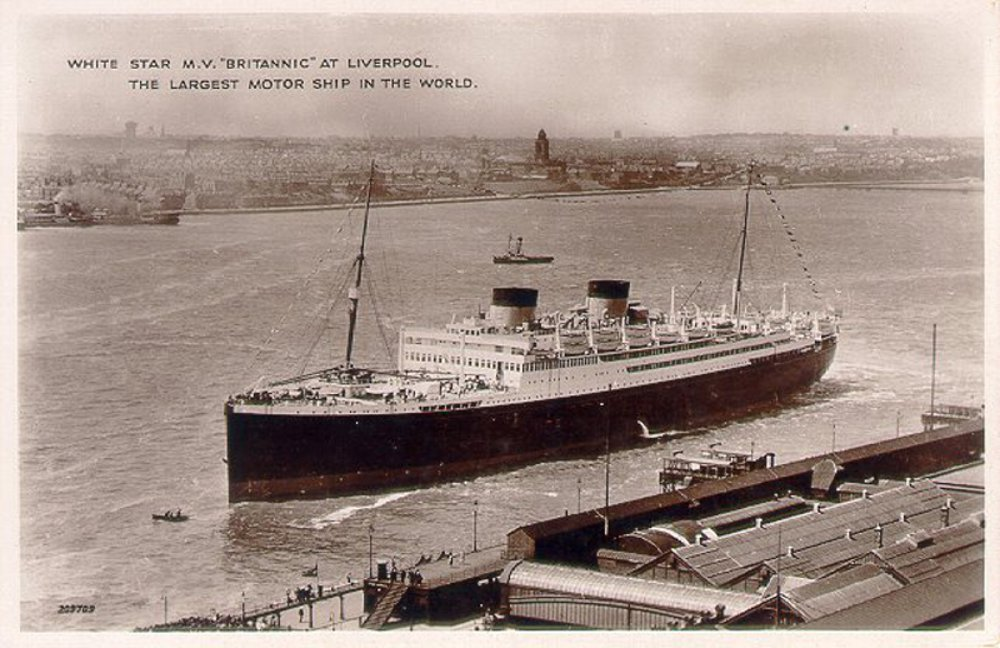
MV Britannic (1929)

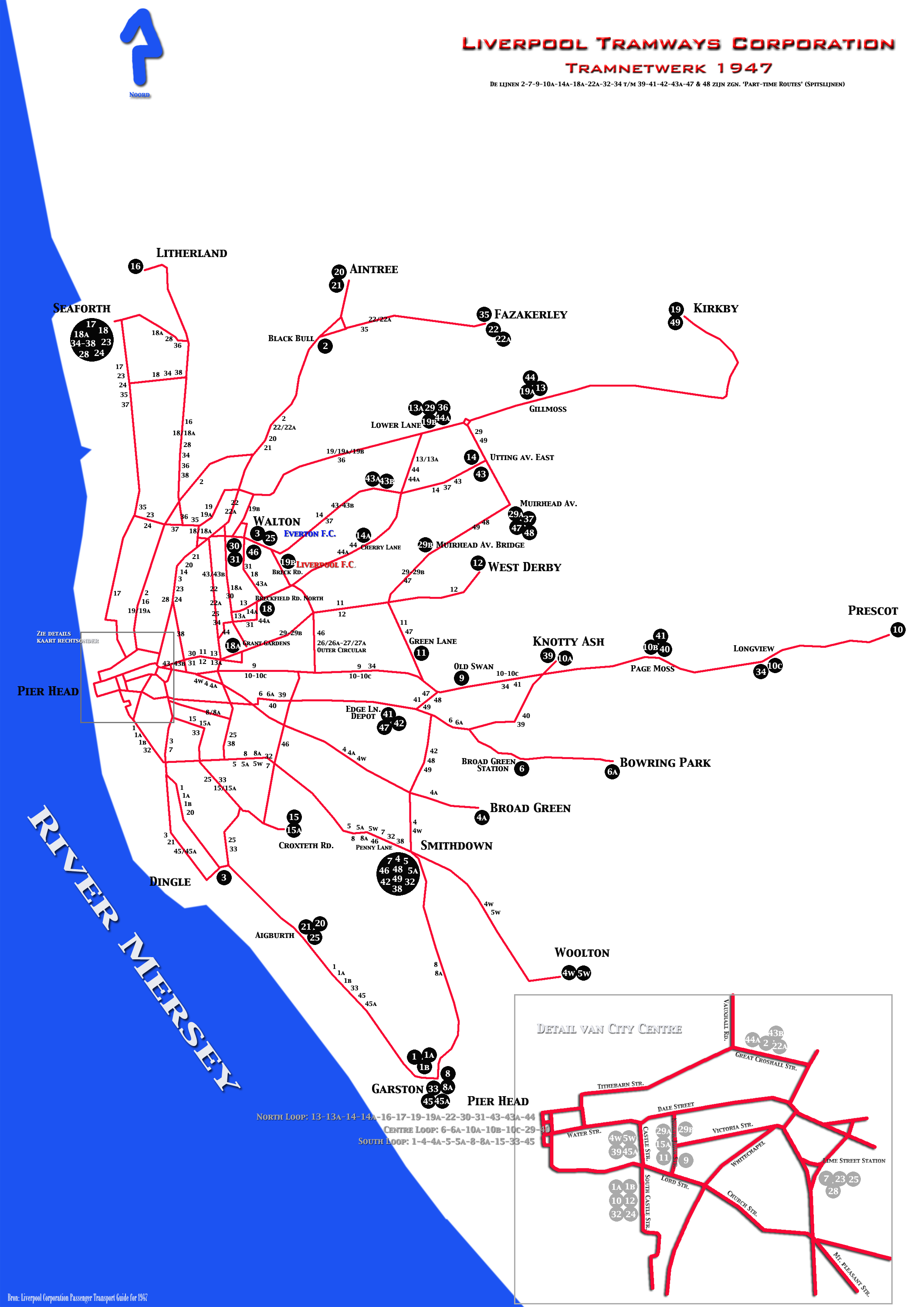
Liverpool Corporation Tramway Routes in 1947

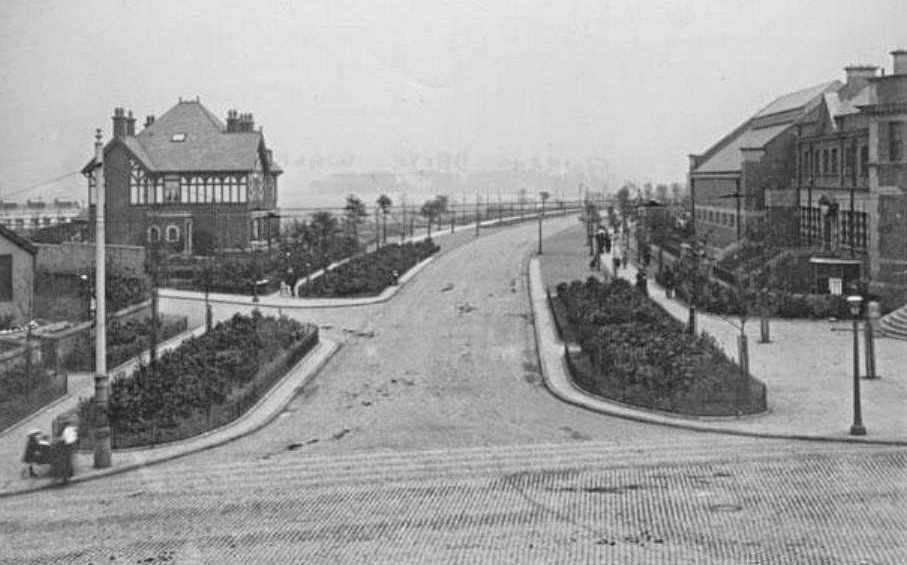
Queens Drive, Walton, Liverpool, pictured in 1909

During the first part of the 20th century Liverpool continued to expand, pulling in immigrants from Europe. In 1903 an International Exhibition took place in Edge Lane. In 1904, the building of the Anglican Cathedral began, and by 1916 the three Pier Head buildings, including the Liver Building, were complete. This period marked the pinnacle of Liverpool's economic success, when it regarded itself as the "second city" of the British Empire. The formerly independent urban districts of Allerton, Childwall, Little Woolton and Much Woolton were added in 1913, and the parish of Speke added in 1932, with large housing developments, mostly by the local authority, being built over the next few years.

Adolf Hitler's half-brother Alois and his Irish sister-in-law Bridget Dowling are known to have lived in Upper Stanhope Street in the 1910s. Bridget's alleged memoirs, which surfaced in the 1970s, said that Adolf stayed with them in 1912–13, although this is much disputed as many believe the memoirs to be a forgery.

The maiden voyage of Titanic in April 1912 was originally planned to depart from Liverpool, as Liverpool was its port of registration and the home of owners White Star Line. However, it was changed to depart from Southampton instead.

Aside from the large Irish community in Liverpool, there were other pockets of cultural diversity. The area of Gerard, Hunter, Lionel and Whale streets, off Scotland Road, was referred to as Little Italy. Inspired by an old Venetian custom, Liverpool was 'married to the sea' in September 1928. Liverpool was also home to a large Welsh population, and was sometimes referred to as the Capital of North Wales. In 1884, 1900 and 1929, Eisteddfods were held in Liverpool.

Economic changes began in the first part of the 20th century, as falls in world demand for the North West's traditional export commodities contributed to stagnation and decline in the city. Unemployment was well above the national average as early as the 1920s, and the city became known nationally for its occasionally violent religious sectarianism.

When Everton F.C. won the Football League First Division title in 1928, their centre-forward Dixie Dean scored a Football League record of 60 goals in the same season.

The Great Depression hit Liverpool badly in the early 1930s with thousands of people in the city left unemployed. This was combated by a large amount of housing mostly built by the local council being constructed, creating jobs mostly in the building, plumbing and electrical trades. About 15 per cent of the city's population were rehoused in the 1920s and 1930s with more than 30,000 new council houses being built to replace the slums in the city.

The rising popularity of motor cars led to congestion in the city, and in 1934 the city gained its first direct road link with the Wirral Peninsula, when the first Mersey Tunnel road was opened. The Queensway, as the new tunnel was named, linked Liverpool with Birkenhead at the other side of the Mersey. Many other buildings were built in the city in the 1930s to ease the depression and became local landmarks, with many buildings featuring American inspired architecture.

=== 1939-1945: World War II ===
During World War 2, Liverpool was the control centre for the Battle of the Atlantic. There were eighty air-raids on Merseyside, with an especially concentrated series of raids in May 1941 which interrupted operations at the docks for almost a week. Some 2,500 people were killed, almost half the homes in the metropolitan area sustained some damage and some 11,000 were totally destroyed. Over 70,000 people were made homeless. John Lennon, one of the founding members of The Beatles, was born in Liverpool during an air-raid on 9 October 1940. All four members of The Beatles were born in the city during the war, rising to fame in the early 1960s.

Thousands of Chinese sailors were recruited to aid the war effort and came to Liverpool, many forming relationships with local women. However, once the war was ended, they were mostly forcibly repatriated.

=== 1946-1979 ===
Significant rebuilding followed the war, including massive housing estates and the Seaforth Dock, the largest dock project in Britain. However, the city has been suffering since the 1950s with the loss of numerous employers. By 1985 the population had fallen to 460,000. Declines in manufacturing and dock activity struck the city particularly hard. In 1956 Liverpool Overhead Railway and its fourteen stations were closed and demolished and in 1957 Liverpool Corporation Tramways closed after the last tram ran in Liverpool.

In 1955, the Labour Party, led locally by Jack and Bessie Braddock, came to power in the City Council for the first time.

In 1956, a private bill sponsored by Liverpool City Council was brought before Parliament to develop a water reservoir from the Tryweryn Valley. The development would include the flooding of Capel Celyn. By obtaining authority via an Act of Parliament, Liverpool City Council would not require planning consent from the relevant Welsh local authorities.

In the 1960s Liverpool became a centre of youth culture. The city produced the distinctive Merseybeat sound, most famously The Beatles, and the Liverpool poets.

From the 1970s onwards Liverpool's docks and traditional manufacturing industries went into further sharp decline. The advent of containerisation meant that Liverpool's docks ceased to be a major local employer. Liverpool Central High Level railway station closed in 1972, as well as the Waterloo, Victoria and Wapping tunnels. In 1974, Liverpool became a metropolitan district within the newly created metropolitan county of Merseyside. In 1977 Liverpool Exchange railway station closed, and in 1979 the North Liverpool Extension Line closed too. In 1972 Canadian Pacific unit CP Ships were the last transatlantic line to operate from Liverpool.

=== 1980s ===
The 1980s saw Liverpool's fortunes sink to their lowest postwar point. Although the 1970s, along with the rest of Britain, had brought economic difficulties and a steady rise in unemployment, the situation in Liverpool went from bad to worse in the early 1980s, with endless factory closures and some of the highest unemployment rates in the UK. An average of 12,000 people each year were leaving the city, and 15% of its land was vacant or derelict.

In July 1981 the infamous Toxteth Riots took place, during which, for the first time in the UK outside Northern Ireland, tear gas was used by police against civilians. In the same year, the Tate and Lyle sugar works, previously a mainstay of the city's manufacturing economy, closed down. The docks had already declined dramatically by this stage, depriving the city of another major source of employment.

By 1985, unemployment in Liverpool exceeded 20%, around double the national average. About this time the scourge of heroin, always present in port cities, began to rise.

Liverpool City Council was dominated by the far-left wing Militant group during the 1980s, under the de facto leadership of Derek Hatton (although Hatton was formally only Deputy Leader). The city council sank heavily into debt, as the City Council fought a campaign to prevent central government from reducing funding for local services. Ultimately this led to 49 of the city's Councillors being removed from office by the District Auditor for refusing to cut the budget, refusing to make good the deficit and forcing the City Council into virtual bankruptcy. The conduct of Hatton and the militant tendency had even come under the scrutiny of Labour Party leader Neil Kinnock, who was keen to remove the militant tendency from the party as part of the attempt to make it electable again. At the same time, the Conservative government of Margaret Thatcher was deeply unpopular in Liverpool, with the Conservatives share of the vote in most local council and parliamentary elections being consistently low throughout the 1980s.

On 15 April 1989 and subsequently 97 Liverpool F.C. fans (mostly from Merseyside but also from neighbouring parts of Cheshire and Lancashire) died in the Hillsborough disaster at an FA Cup semi-final in Sheffield. This had a traumatic effect on people across the country, particularly in and around the city of Liverpool, and resulted in legally imposed changes in the way in which football fans have since been accommodated, including compulsory all-seater stadiums at all leading English clubs by the mid-1990s. Many clubs removed their perimeter fencing almost immediately after the tragedy and such measures at football grounds in England have long since been banned.

In particular it led to strong feeling in Liverpool because it was widely reported in the media that the Liverpool fans were at fault. The Sun sparked particular controversy for publishing such allegations in an article four days after the disaster. Sales of the newspaper in Liverpool slumped and many newsagents refused to stock it. Three decades later many people in the city still refuse to buy The Sun and a number of newsagents still refuse to sell it. Other media outlets, including the Daily Star and Daily Mail, also printed stories in which the behaviour of Liverpool fans was alleged to have been a major factor in the tragedy.

There was further controversy surrounding the tragedy in March 1991 when a verdict of accidental death was recorded on the 95 people who had died at Hillsborough (the 96th victim did not die until 1993), much to the dismay of the bereaved families, who had been hoping for a verdict of unlawful killing, or an open verdict, to be recorded; and for criminal charges to be brought against South Yorkshire Police. This verdict was eventually replaced by one of unlawful killing at fresh inquest 25 years later.

It has since become clear that South Yorkshire Police made a range of mistakes at the game, though the senior officer in charge of the event retired soon after.

The success of Liverpool FC was some compensation for the city's economic misfortune during the 1970s and 1980s. The club, formed in 1892, had won five league titles by 1947, but enjoyed its first consistent run of success under the management of Bill Shankly between 1959 and 1974, winning a further three league titles as well as the club's first two FA Cups and its first European trophy in the shape of the UEFA Cup. Following Shankly's retirement, the club continued to dominate English football for nearly 20 years afterwards. By 1990, Liverpool FC had won more major trophies than any other English club - a total of 18 top division league titles, four FA Cups, four Football League Cups, four European Cups and two UEFA Cups. The club's iconic red shirt had been worn by some of the biggest names in British sport of the 1970s and 1980s, including Kevin Keegan, Kenny Dalglish (who also served as manager from 1985 to 1991 and again from 2011 to 2012), Phil Neal, Ian Rush, Ian Callaghan and John Barnes. The club has since won their first Premier League title and a further three FA Cups, three League Cups, a UEFA Cup and two European Cups, and fielded a new wave of stars including Robbie Fowler, Michael Owen, Jamie Carragher and Steven Gerrard.

Everton F.C., the city's original senior football club, also enjoyed a degree of success during the 1970s and 1980s. The club had enjoyed a consistent run of success during the interwar years and again in the 1960s, but after winning the league title in 1970 went 14 years without winning a major trophy, although they did hold onto the First Division place which had been theirs since 1954. Then, in 1984, Everton won the FA Cup under the management of Howard Kendall, who had once been a player at the club. A league title win followed in 1985, along with the club's first European trophy – the European Cup Winners' Cup. By 1986, the city's two clubs were firmly established as the leading club sides in England as Liverpool finished league champions and Everton runners-up, and the two sides also met for the FA Cup final, which Liverpool won 3–1. The Everton side of the mid-1980s included some of the highest rated footballers in the English league at the time; goalkeeper Neville Southall, winger Trevor Steven, forwards Graeme Sharp and Andy Gray, and Gray's successor Gary Lineker.

Everton have enjoyed an unbroken run in the top flight of English football since 1954, although their only major trophy since the league title in 1987 came in 1995 when they won the FA Cup. Everton added another league title in 1987, with Liverpool finishing runners-up.

Another all-Merseyside FA Cup final 1989 saw Liverpool beat Everton 3–2. This match was played just five weeks after the Hillsborough disaster.

=== 1990s ===
A similar national outpouring of grief and shock to the Hillsborough disaster occurred in February 1993 when James Bulger was killed by two ten-year-old boys, Jon Venables and Robert Thompson. The two boys were found guilty of murder later in the year and sentenced to indefinite detention.

The 1990s saw the continued regeneration of the city which had started in the 1980s. This is still happening in 2020.

== Recent history ==
A general economic and civic revival has been underway since the mid-nineties. Liverpool's economy has grown faster than the national average and its crime levels have remained lower than most other metropolitan areas in England and Wales, with recorded crime per head in Merseyside comparable to the national average—unusually low for an urban area.

In recent years, the city has emphasised its cultural attractions. Tourism has become a significant factor in Liverpool's economy, capitalising on the popularity of the Beatles and other groups of the Merseybeat era. In June 2003, Liverpool won the right to be named European Capital of Culture for 2008, beating other British cities such as Newcastle and Birmingham to the coveted title. The riverfront of the city was also designated as a World Heritage Site in 2004 until its revocation in 2021.

In October 2005, Liverpool City Council passed a public apology for the flooding of Capel Celyn in Wales.

In October 2007, Liverpool and London continued with wildcat strikes, after the end of the official CWU strikes, that had been ongoing since June in a dispute with the Royal Mail over pay, pensions, and hours.

On November 11, 2021, a bomb inside a taxi detonated outside Liverpool Women’s Hospital. It has been recognised as a terror attack.

== See also ==
- History of housing in Liverpool
- Timeline of Liverpool
