= West Derbyshire =

West Derbyshire may refer to:

- West Derby Hundred, one of the six subdivisions of Lancashire, England, in the 11th century
- West Derbyshire (UK Parliament constituency), in the west of Derbyshire, England, unrelated to the above
- The former name of the Derbyshire Dales district, covering roughly the same area as the constituency
