= Liverpool Castle =

Castle in Liverpool, England

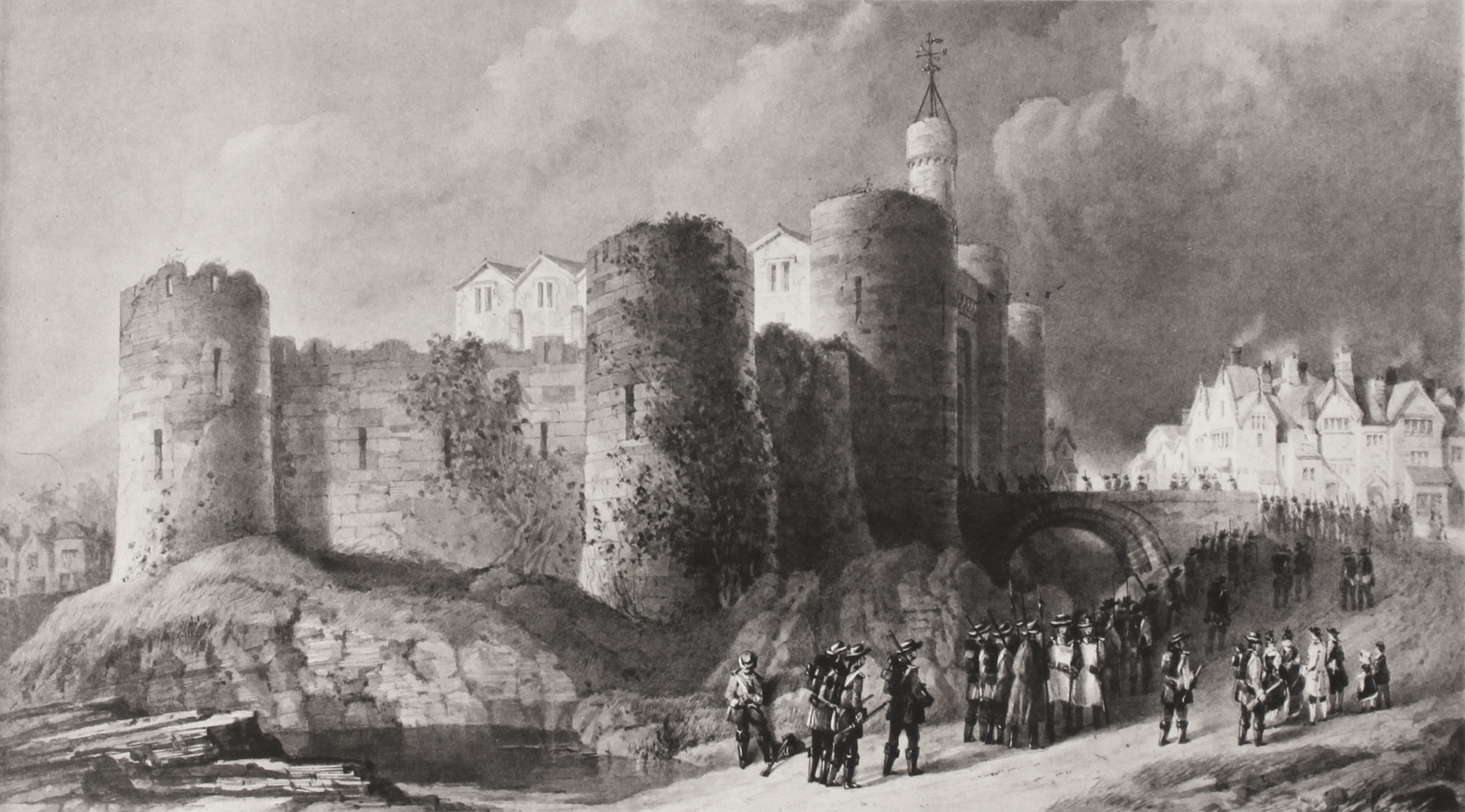
- Painting of Liverpool Castle in 1689, published in 1878

- Location within Merseyside

General information
- Architectural style: Fortified manor house
- Location: Liverpool, Merseyside, England
- Coordinates: 53.404934°N 2.988891°W
- Construction started: 1232
- Completed: 1237
- Demolished: 1726
- Client: William de Ferrers, 4th Earl of Derby

Liverpool Castle was a castle in Liverpool, England, that stood from the early 13th century to the early 18th century (1237–1726).

== Construction ==
There are no surviving records that state when the castle was first constructed. In 1235, during the reign of Henry III, William de Ferrers, 4th Earl of Derby was issued a licence to crenellate with specific permission to "strengthen his castle" suggesting further work is to be carried out on an existing structure. In West Derby, the Earl already had a motte and bailey castle which was acquired by the Ferrers family in 1232. However, with the foundation of Liverpool through Letters Patent from King John in 1207, the military importance of West Derby Castle steadily declined and its garrison of 140 soldiers was transferred to Liverpool Castle in 1235. In 1297 West Derby Castle was completely abandoned in favour of Liverpool Castle; it was reported to be in ruins by 1326.

Liverpool Castle was built to protect King John's new port. It was sited at the junction of Castle Street and Lord Street, the highest point that overlooked The Pool, which was a natural tidal inlet and Liverpool's original harbour. The area is now occupied by present-day Derby Square (Queen Victoria Monument), near the city centre.

== Description ==
The castle was built on top of a plateau, which had been specially constructed, and a moat measuring 20 yards (18 m) was cut out of solid rock. The main building of the castle consisted of the gatehouse flanked by two towers at the north-east corner which faced Castle Street; three round towers at the three remaining corners, one being added at a later date than the others, in 1442. Four curtain walls connected the four towers; the northern and southern walls were recessed to allow them to be commanded from the towers. Inside the castle were a hall and chapel, which were connected to the south-western tower, and a brewhouse and bakehouse. There was also a passage which ran under the moat toward the edge of the river. The courtyard was divided by a wall built running from the north wall to the south wall. Underneath the castle walls stood a dovecot, and an orchard ran from the castle to the Pool in the east.

== History ==
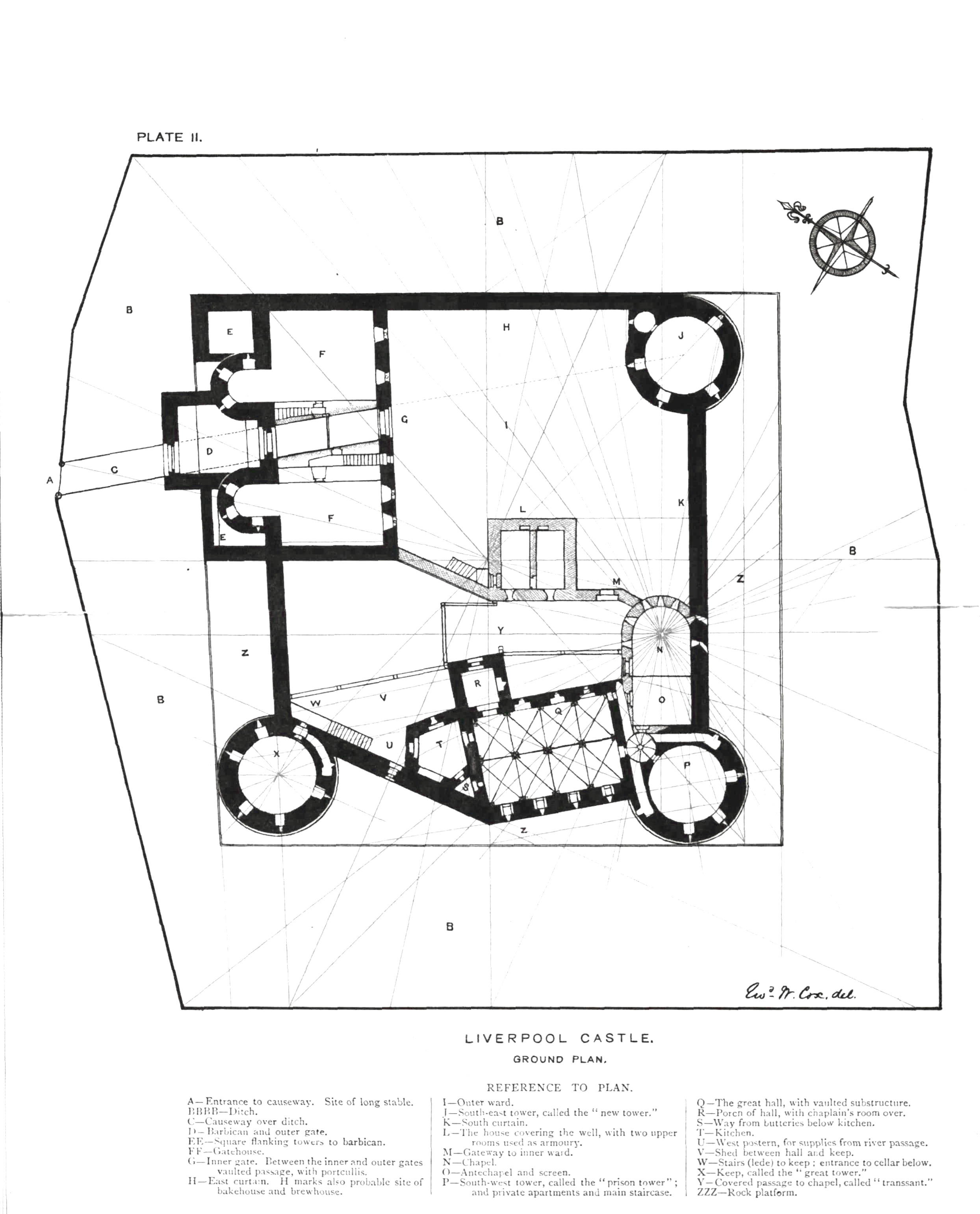
A plan of Liverpool Castle made by 19th century historian Edward Cox. The plan was conjectural, created using "maps and surveys of an official character"

Upon the death of William de Ferrers in 1247, his son William inherited both Liverpool Castle and West Derby Castle. The heir to the title was Robert de Ferrers. He rebelled against King Henry III and was arrested and held in the Tower of London and then Windsor Castle. His lands and title were removed and taken back by the Crown. Henry III presented the land, along with Lancaster to his second son Edmund. Mary de Ferrers, wife of the forfeited earl and niece to the King, was ordered to surrender the castle in July 1266. The lands were then held by Edmund and passed onto his successor Thomas.

It was under the administration of Thomas that Liverpool progressed steadily. The earl did not bestow much worth on the borough of Liverpool and in 1315, he granted the castle and the land to Robert de Holland. The creation of the patronage of Robert de Holland caused some unrest among other landowners, and on 25 October in the same year Adam Banastre, Henry de Lea and William de Bradshagh (Bradshaw) banded together (the Banastre Rebellion) and launched an attack on the castle, and were defeated within an hour. This is the only recorded attack on the castle to happen before the English Civil War. Between 1315 and 1323, the borough of Liverpool returned to the hands of the Crown. In 1323, King Edward II visited the town and lodged at the castle from 24 to 30 October. Early in the reign of Edward III, the king utilised Liverpool as a port of embarkation in his wars with Scotland and Ireland. In 1327, Edward ordered the constable of the castle to give shelter to men fleeing from the Scots. There was an inquisition into the land at Lancaster in 1367 that stated "there is at Liverpull a certain Castle, the foss [fosse] whereof and the herbage are worth by the year 2s., and there is a dovehouse under the Castle which is worth by the year 6s.8d."

Sir Richard Molyneux was appointed constable of the castle in 1440, and the title was made hereditary five years later. In 1442, the castle was strengthened by the addition of a fourth tower in the south-east corner to the cost of £46 13s 10¼d. On 2 October 1559 the castle is stated as being "in utter ruin and decay". The Great Tower had a slate roof and it was suggested to be used as storage for the court rolls. It was decided that the castle would undergo repairs costing around £150, "otherwaies it were a grate defacement unto the said towne of Litherpole".

St George's Church Liverpool Act 1715
- Act of Parliament
- Parliament of Great Britain
- Long title: An Act for building and endowing a Church upon the Scite of the Castle of Liverpoole, held by Lease from the Dutchy of Lancaster; and for explaining a former Act for the building another Church there.
- Citation: 1 Geo. 1. St. 2. c. 21 Pr.
- Territorial extent: Great Britain

Dates
- Royal assent: 30 August 1715
- Commencement: 17 March 1715 (Note: Start of session.)
Other legislation
Amended by	Liverpool City Churches 1897

Status: Amended

At the outbreak of the First English Civil War, the castle was held by the Royalist James Stanley, 7th Earl of Derby for Charles I. But in April 1643 Parliamentarian troops crossed the Mersey to join their forces at Childwall. Together they took the castle from its constable Richard Molyneux, 2nd Viscount Molyneux killing 80 royalists and capturing 300 more. Molyneux and the other survivors escaped to Everton Brow. A year later Prince Rupert, as commander of the Royalist cavalry, led a Royalist Army back to Liverpool to retake the castle. It is from Everton Brow that Prince Rupert made preparations for the attack and it is from here that he looked down at the castle and dismissed it with the words: "It is a crow’s nest that any party of schoolboys could take!". It eventually fell after a week of heavy fighting and the loss of 1,500 of his men.

Protestant supporters of William of Orange seized the castle during the Glorious Revolution in 1689. On 5 March 1704, the burgesses obtained a lease for the castle and its site from the Crown for fifty years. William Molyneux, 4th Viscount Molyneux, disputed this as he still claimed hereditary constableship. This delayed the settlement of the lease until 1726, when the last remaining ruins of the castle were removed. In 1707/08 a Mr. Serocold, a London surveyor involved in the planning of Liverpool's new wet dock suggested reusing the castle's stone to save money on the dock walls, it is possible this plan went ahead. A year before the opening of the world's first commercial wet dock, a 1715 Act of Parliament (1 Geo. 1. St. 2. c. 21) was passed to demolish the castle and build a church in its place. Construction of St George's church began on the site of the old castle and the church was consecrated in 1734. By 1825, the church had been pulled down and a new one built in its place. In 1899, the church was demolished and the Victoria Monument was erected in 1902. In 1976 excavation of the south side of Castle Street was conducted before the construction of the Crown Courts building, which was built in the style of a castle.

== Replica ==
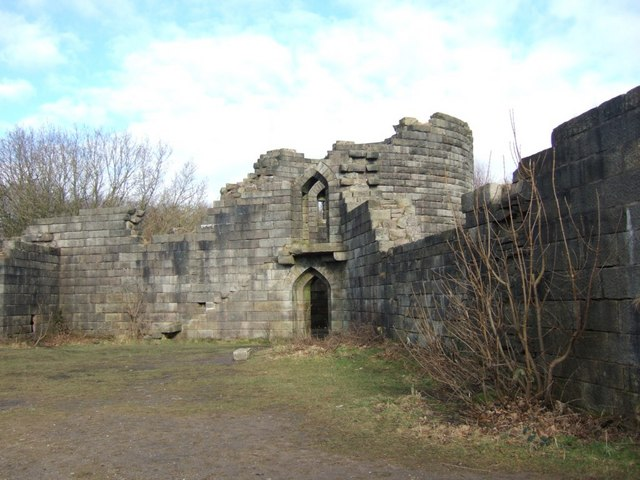
Scale replica of Liverpool Castle as seen at Rivington

At Lever Park in Rivington (near Chorley), Sir William Lever built a scale replica of Liverpool Castle, a folly known as Rivington Castle. Building started in 1912. The replica, which was not completed, was based on a conjectural reconstruction of the castle prepared by E. W. Cox in 1892.
