= Oughtred =

Oughtred or Ughtred is an Anglo-Saxon English given name and surname. It means "son of Uhtred", being derived from the old English Ūhtrǣd composed of the elements uht "twilight, dusk" and ræd "advice". It may refer to the following people:

== Given name ==
- Uhtred of Bamburgh (died 1016), Anglo-Saxon warlord
- Ughtred Kay-Shuttleworth (1844–1939), English landowner and politician

== Surname ==
- Anthony Ughtred (c. 1478–1534), English soldier and military administrator
- Bernard Oughtred (1880–1949), English rugby union player
- Elizabeth Oughtred (1518–1568), English baroness, wife of Anthony Ughtred
- Evelyne Oughtred Buchanan (1883–1979), British artist
- Henry Ughtred (c. 1533–1598), English Member of Parliament, shipowner and shipbuilder
- Natasha Oughtred, English ballerina
- Thomas Ughtred, 1st Baron Ughtred (1292–c.1365), English soldier and politician
- William Oughtred (1574–1660), English mathematician and Anglican clergyman
