= Derby Square =

Square in the city centre of Liverpool, England

Coordinates: 53.4050°N 2.9911°W

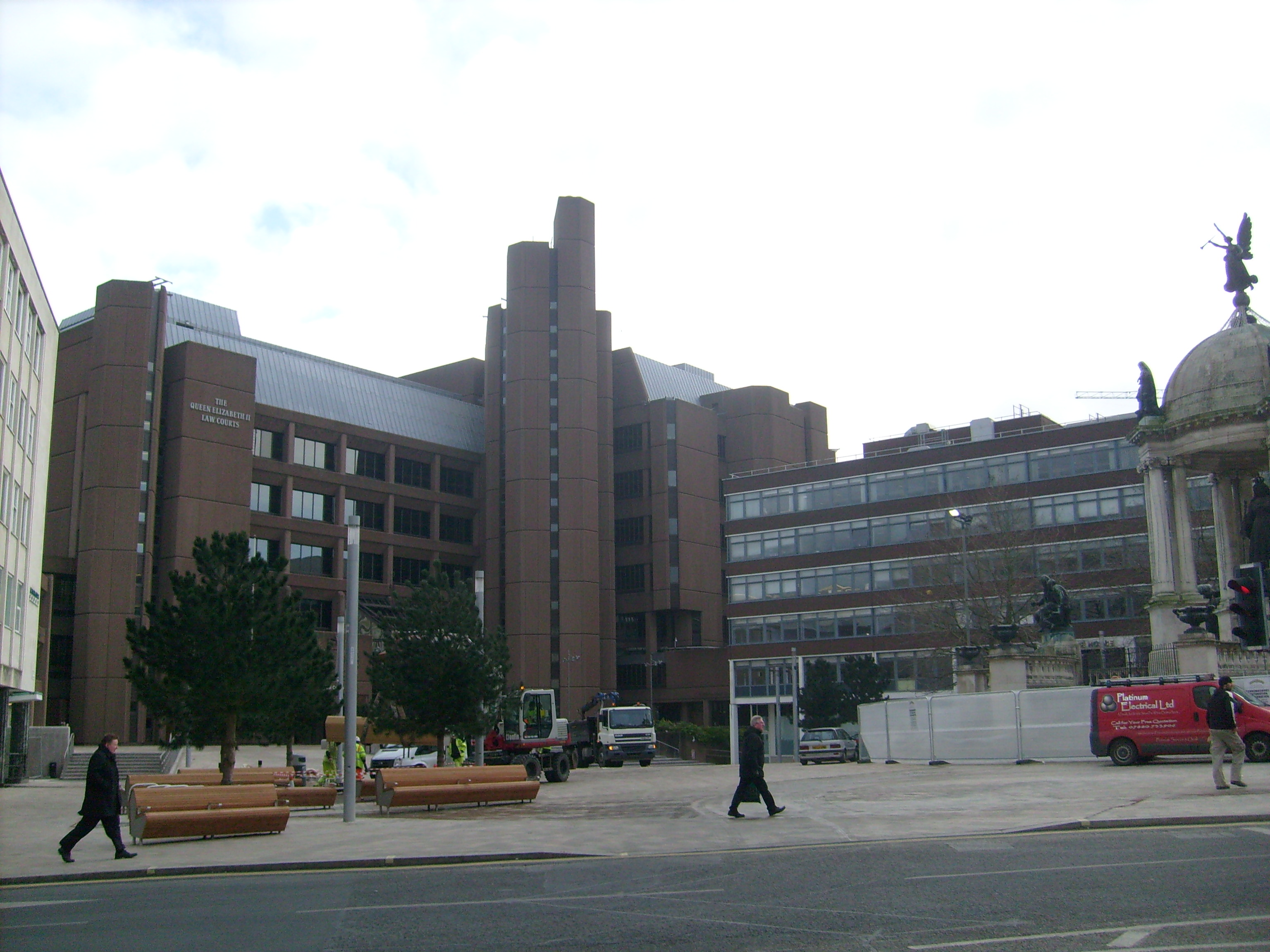
Queen Elizabeth II Law Courts, Liverpool

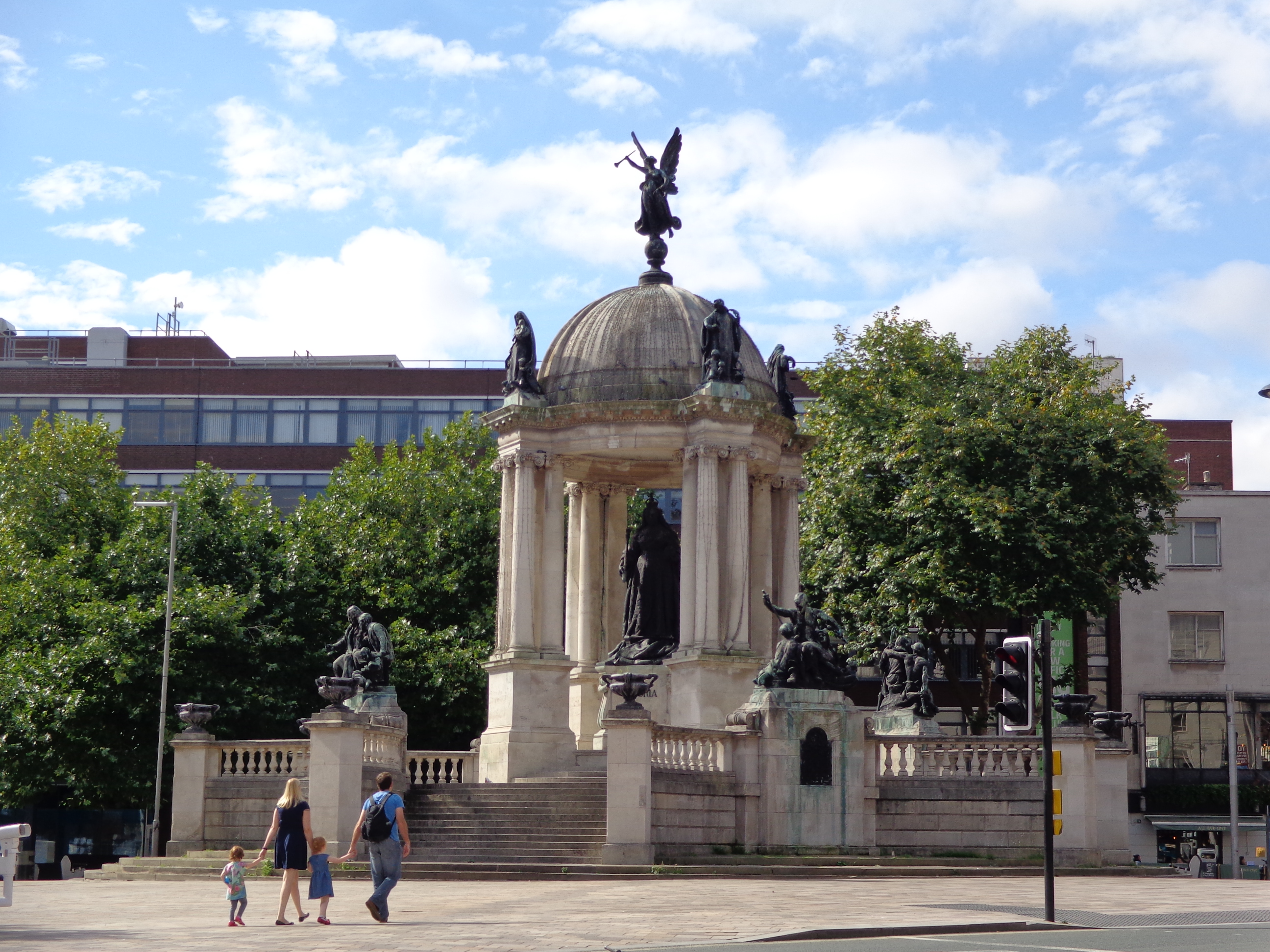
Victoria Monument

Derby Square is in the city centre of Liverpool, England.

The square stands on what was the original site for Liverpool Castle. Records differ on when it was built, but it is believed to have been constructed any time from 1208 to 1235. Following the English Civil War, parliament ordered the castle to be destroyed and by 1715 the castle was a ruin, with its bricks and stone being recycled for other building work in the city.

St George's Church was built on the square and opened in 1726. The church had to be rebuilt between 1809 and 1825 as the tower was starting to crack. This was because the church was built over part of the rubble-filled moat of the old castle and had begun to settle and crack.

Funding for the church was stopped by Liverpool Corporation after an antisemitic sermon was preached following the appointment of a Jewish Mayor, Charles Mozley, in 1863. The church closed in 1897 and was demolished two years later.

Between 1838 and 1840 the architect Edward Corbett constructed the North and South Wales Bank building, which is now known as Castle Moat House and still stands on the square.

The Victoria Monument, dedicated to Queen Victoria, was built on the square and was officially unveiled in 1906. The monument was given Grade II listed status in 1975.

The square was damaged extensively during the 1941 blitz, though despite the heavy damage, the Victoria Monument escaped without any serious damage.

In 1973, construction work began on Queen Elizabeth II Law Courts, Liverpool, with the facility opening in 1984. The 1970s also saw the square linked to The Strand as part of Liverpool's skyway project. The project was never fully implemented, and the bridges were removed in the 2000s.
