= Queen Elizabeth II Law Courts, Liverpool =

Court building in Derby Square, Liverpool, England

Queen Elizabeth II Law Courts
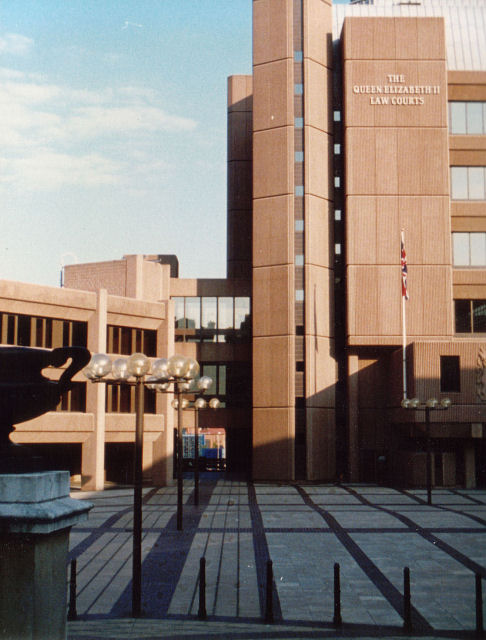
- Queen Elizabeth II Law Courts
- Interactive map of the Queen Elizabeth II Law Courts area

General information
- Location: Queen Elizabeth II Law Courts, Derby Square, Liverpool
- Coordinates: 53.4041°N 2.9896°W
- Completed: 1984
- Client: His Majesty's Courts Service

Design and construction
- Architects: Farmer and Dark

The Queen Elizabeth II Law Courts, in Derby Square, Liverpool, are operated by His Majesty's Courts and Tribunals Service. The building is used by the Crown Court, the Magistrates' Court, Liverpool District Probate Registry and the Liverpool Youth Court.

== History ==
Until the mid-1980s, all Crown Court cases were heard in St George's Hall. However, as the number of court cases in Liverpool grew, it became necessary to commission a more modern courthouse for both criminal and civil matters: the site selected by the Lord Chancellor's Department had been occupied by Liverpool Castle between the 13th and 18th century.

The new building was commissioned by the now-defunct Property Services Agency, who were seeking a design which expressed authority and power. Construction of the new building started in 1973. It was designed by Farmer and Dark in the brutalist style, built with vertically ribbed pre-cast concrete panels in dark, reddish tones at a cost of £43.4 million, and was officially opened in 1984.

Hearings of the Liverpool Magistrates Court, which had been held at the courthouse in Dale Street, transferred to the Queen Elizabeth II Law Courts in 2015.

== Architecture ==
The design by Farmer and Dark features towers on the north and south sides which were intended to echo Liverpool Castle. Pollard and Pevsner describe the architecture as "hulking" and "dispiriting", but "richly sculptural". The front facade of the building features a four metres wide version of the Royal coat of arms. Cast in concrete, it was designed by British sculptor Richard Kindersley. The interior, which accommodates 28 court rooms on 10 storeys, contains strips of brown ceramic tiles in strips between the staircase tower windows.

== Notable trials ==
Notable trials have included:

- The trial and acquittal of Ken Dodd for tax evasion in 1990
- The trial and conviction of Michael Barton for the murder of Anthony Walker in 2005
- The trial and conviction of Sean Mercer for the murder of Rhys Jones in 2008
- The trial and conviction of the Gooch Close Gang for murder in 2009
