= Uhtred =

Uhtred is a masculine given name of Anglo-Saxon origin, prevalent during the Medieval period, with several recorded spelling variations. It may refer to:

== People ==
- Uhtred of Hwicce (died c. 779), King of Hwicce
- Uhtred (Derbyshire ealdorman) (early to mid 10th century), ealdorman (earl) in Derbyshire
- Uhtred of Lindisfarne, Bishop of Lindisfarne, appointed in 942?
- Uhtred of Bamburgh (died 1016), ealdorman of Northumbria under King Æthelred II of England
- Uchtred Fitz-Scott (c. 1090-1130), noble mentioned among the courtiers of King David I of Scotland
- Uchdryd ap Edwin (late 11th to early 12th century) Welsh noble linked to the castle at Cymer
- Uhtred (Bishop of Llandaff), Welsh Bishop of Llandaff from 1140 to 1148
- Uhtred of Galloway (c. 1120–1174), Lord of Galloway
- Uthred of Boldon (c. 1320–1397), English Benedictine theologian and writer

== Variants ==
Historically recorded name spelling variants include : Uhtred, Uchtred, Uchtredus, Ughtred, Oughtred, Owtred, Uthred, Ucterd, Uhtred, Utred, Uchdryd, Uchdrud.

== Fictional characters ==
- Uhtred of Bebbanburg, protagonist of The Saxon Stories, a historical novel series by Bernard Cornwell and The Last Kingdom TV series
- Uchdryd Battle Protector, Uchdryd Cross Beard, and Uchdryd son of Erim are warriors named in the 11th-century Welsh Arthurian tale of Culhwch and Olwen

== See also ==
- Oughtred
