= West Derby Hundred =

Historical division of Lancashire, England

Hundred of West Derby
- Lancashire Hundred

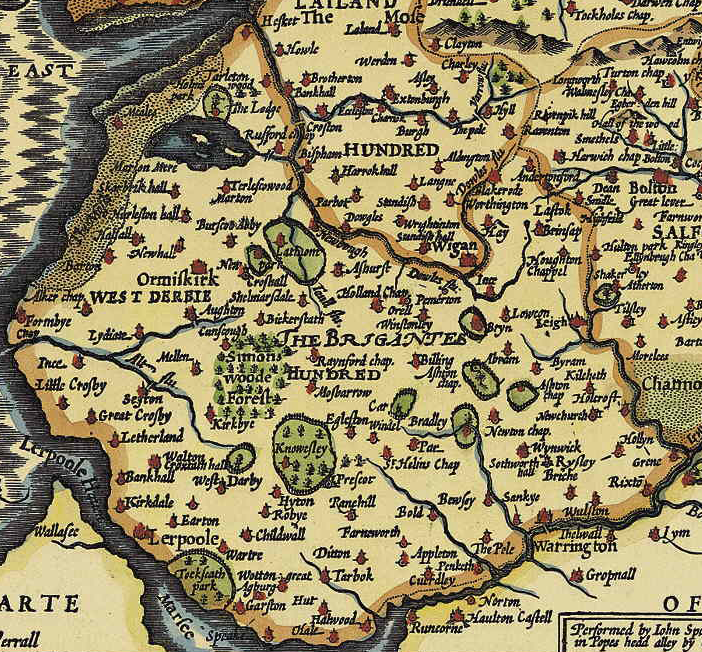
- West Derby Hundred depicted in John Speed's 1610 map of Lancashire
- History
  - Created: 11th century
- Subdivisions
  - Type: Parish(es)
  - Units: Walton • Halsall • Aughton • Liverpool • Sefton • Altcar • Warrington • Wigan • Childwall • North Meols • Prescot • Winwick • Huyton • Ormskirk • Leigh

Hundreds of Lancashire

The West Derby Hundred (also known historically as West Derbyshire) was one of the six hundreds of the historic county of Lancashire, in northern England. Centred on the township of West Derby, it occupied much of south-west Lancashire, extending from the River Mersey in the south towards the Ribble estuary in the north-west.

The hundred included Liverpool, Wigan, Leigh, Warrington, Widnes, Ormskirk, Southport and their surrounding areas. Its territory now lies across parts of the ceremonial counties of Merseyside, Greater Manchester, Cheshire and Lancashire. The Victoria County History treats most of modern Merseyside north of the Mersey, together with Warrington, Widnes and Ormskirk, as part of West Derby Hundred, with Liverpool and Wigan covered in the continuation of the hundred in its following volume.

== History ==
=== Domesday Book ===
At the time of the Domesday Book in 1086, Lancashire had not yet emerged as a county. The territory which later formed Lancashire was recorded in different parts of the survey: the land south of the Ribble was surveyed with Cheshire under the description Inter Ripam et Mersham ("between the Ribble and the Mersey"), while territory further north was recorded with Yorkshire. The land between the Ribble and Mersey was divided into six hundreds: West Derby, Warrington, Newton, Salford, Blackburn and Leyland.

The area which later formed West Derby Hundred was therefore divided at Domesday between the separate hundreds of West Derby, Warrington and Newton-in-Makerfield. Warrington and Newton were subsequently absorbed into West Derby Hundred before the reign of Henry II, probably during the reign of Henry I.

The later hundred extended across much of south-west Lancashire. Its western boundary ran from the Ribble estuary along the Irish Sea coast and then the River Mersey; to the south it followed the Mersey and Glazebrook. Salford Hundred lay to the east, while much of the northern boundary with Leyland Hundred followed the River Douglas, before continuing through Martin Mere towards the Ribble estuary.

West Derby was the chief manor and became the administrative centre of the hundred. Before the Norman Conquest, the capital manor of West Derby was held by Edward the Confessor. By 1086 it was held by Roger of Poitou, who is recorded in Domesday as both lord and tenant-in-chief.

The royal manor had six berewicks, or dependent estates, although the Domesday survey does not name them individually. Later documentary evidence has identified these as including Hale, Garston with Aigburth, Liverpool, Everton, Fazakerley, possibly with Aintree and Newsham, and Great Crosby; Thingwall also appears to have been associated with the royal demesne. The Domesday entry records a substantial estate at West Derby, including woodland, fisheries and land for numerous plough teams.

West Derby Castle, a motte-and-bailey castle, subsequently formed the administrative centre of the manor and hundred. The castle was probably built by Roger of Poitou around 1100. Historic England records that the castle later served as a stronghold and centre of local or royal administration, and that archaeological remains of its motte, bailey, ditches and ramparts survive beneath the modern site.

A number of Anglo-Saxon landholders are named in the Domesday entries for the hundred. Among the most prominent was Uhtred, who before the Conquest held estates including Roby, Knowsley, Kirkby, Little Crosby, Maghull and Aughton, together with other holdings at places including Kirkdale, Lathom, Lydiate, Skelmersdale and Speke.

=== Expansion of the boundaries ===
By the end of the 12th century the three separate hundreds had united and West Derby Castle was an important administrative centre rivalling Lancaster in the north of the county. Its position was strengthened by its proximity to the Port of Liverpool, which was founded by King John, trade with Cheshire and the passage of ferries from Liverpool to Birkenhead. By 1327 West Derby Castle was reported to be in ruins.

=== Court and laws on the hundred ===
A Wapentake court was held every three weeks with the steward of the hundred officiating. There had been a courthouse in West Derby for over 1000 years since the time of the Vikings. The present courthouse situated in West Derby is from a building which was constructed during the reign of Queen Elizabeth I. The court was used for the presentation of minor offences, or breaches of any laws within the hundred. The King, or lord of the manor had his own bailiff, who was the officer to the sheriff, who had the duty to ensure peace within the hundred and collect any taxes or levys from the people. From the reign of Stephen of England to that of Henry IV this office was a hereditary title held by members of the Walton family of Walton-on-the-Hill. By the fifteenth century the master of the forest was held by members of the Molyneux family, who also held the title of steward of the hundred.

=== Land changes hands ===
On 18 October 1229, Henry III granted all land from the Ribble to the Mersey, including West Derby, Liverpool, the village of Salford, and the wapentake of Leyland to Ranulf Earl of Chester and Lincoln. When he died in 1232 without any heir the land was inherited by William de Ferrers, through his wife Agnes, sister of the late earl. The land was then passed on to his son William, and then to his son Robert. In 1263, Robert held court against several people who had committed offences against the deer of his forest. In 1266 he rebelled against the rule of the King Henry III and was beaten at the Battle of Chesterfield, following this he was stripped of his title and land, which returned to the hands of the Crown, which was then given to Edmund, the King's second son, who was later created Earl of Lancaster. The title and land followed the line of descent of honour of Lancaster from Edmund until it was merged into the Crown in 1413, and is vested in the reigning monarch.

=== Decline and later history ===
During the 19th century, hundreds progressively ceased to have administrative and judicial functions as their responsibilities were transferred to newer institutions. Hundreds remained in use for some purposes during the first half of the century, including early censuses, but their administrative importance declined following the establishment of petty sessional divisions and other forms of local administration. Their remaining collective liability for damage caused during civil disturbances ended in 1886.

The growth of Liverpool also absorbed parts of the township of West Derby. Part of West Derby was incorporated into Liverpool in 1835, with further territory incorporated in 1895. West Derby nevertheless continued to exist as a civil parish outside the city until the early 20th century.

== Legacy ==
Although hundreds progressively lost their administrative and judicial functions during the 19th century, West Derby Hundred continued to be used as a historical and geographical description after its practical administrative role had ended. Hundreds generally declined in administrative importance after 1834, remained in use for census purposes until the mid-19th century and retained some residual statutory functions until 1886.

A surviving physical reminder of the former administration of the area is the Old Court House in West Derby village. The present sandstone building dates from 1662 and was constructed as the court house for the Manor of West Derby. Its interior retains the steward's bench, jury benches and pigeonholes used for storing court records. The building was designated a Grade II* listed building in 1952.

The hundred also continued to provide a framework for historical scholarship after its administrative functions had disappeared. Volume III of the Victoria County History of Lancashire, published in 1907, was devoted to West Derby Hundred and covered much of the territory from Sefton and Ormskirk to Warrington and Widnes. The history of the hundred was continued in Volume IV, published in 1911, which included Liverpool and Wigan.

The name was also retained in public commemoration. The West Derby War Memorial, unveiled on 23 July 1922 by the Bishop of Liverpool, commemorates those from the hundred who died during the First World War. It was commissioned by glass manufacturer Frederick Dixon Nuttall following the death of his son, Lieutenant J. F. Dixon Nuttall of the West Lancashire Divisional Royal Engineers. Its inscription commemorates those from the "West Derby Hundred of the County Palatine of Lancaster" who fought and died in the war. Historic England describes West Derby Hundred in its listing as one of the six ancient divisions of Lancashire, stretching from the Mersey to the Ribble. The memorial is designated a Grade II* listed structure.

== Places encompassed by the hundred of West Derby ==
- Aintree
- Ashton-in-Makerfield
- Astley
- Atherton
- Aughton
- Bootle
- Childwall
- Crosby
- Eccleston
- Everton
- Hardshaw within Windle
- Ince-in-Makerfield
- Formby
- Huyton
- Kirkby
- Knowsley
- Leigh
- Litherland
- Lunt
- Lydiate
- Maghull
- Newton Le Willows
- North Meols
- Ormskirk
- Pemberton
- Prescot
- Rainford
- Rainhill
- St Helens
- Sefton
- Skelmersdale
- Southport
- Tyldesley
- Toxteth
- Warrington
- West Derby
- Wigan
- Widnes
- Windle
- Woolton
