= West Derby Castle =

Motte-and-bailey castle in Liverpool, England

- Liverpool, England

Site information
- Type: Motte-and-bailey

Location
- Shown within Merseyside
- Coordinates: 53.43454°N 2.90887°W
- Grid reference: grid reference SJ39709348

Site history
- Built: 1100
- Built by: Roger de Poitou
- Materials: Timber
- Demolished: c. 1817

West Derby Castle was a Norman castle in West Derby, Liverpool, Merseyside; only cropmarks and underground ruins survive today.

== History ==
=== Construction and early repairs ===
Roger de Poitou built West Derby Castle as a timber motte-and-bailey structure surrounded by a moat in 1100. The Castle was repaired between 1197 and 1202 and again in 1213 and then between 1218 and 1227.

=== Foundation of Liverpool and decline ===
When the town of Liverpool was founded in 1207, West Derby Castle began to decline in importance, and the garrison of 140 soldiers stationed at West Derby Castle was moved to Liverpool Castle in 1235.

Upon the death of William de Ferrers in 1247, his son William inherited both Liverpool Castle and West Derby Castle. The heir to the title was Robert de Ferrers. He rebelled against King Henry III and was arrested and held in the Tower of London and then Windsor Castle. His lands and title were removed and taken back by the Crown. Henry III presented the land, along with Lancaster to his second son Edmund. Mary de Ferrers, wife of the forfeited earl and niece to the King, was ordered to surrender the castle in July 1266. The lands were then held by Edmund and passed onto his successor Thomas.

It was under the administration of Thomas that West Derby Castle was abandoned in favour of Liverpool Castle in 1297, and it was reported to be in ruins in 1326 and 1327. Around 1817 a Mr. Gascoigne, Lord of the Manor levelled the earthworks of West Derby Castle.

== Excavation ==
The timber remnants of West Derby Castle were discovered during excavations in the mid 1930s.

Excavations in 1927 and 1956 discovered oak beams and cropmarks belonging to the castle, and the moat was identified and excavated along Meadow Lane in 2022. Pottery of dates ranging from the 12th to 18th centuries was discovered to have been discarded into the moat.
