= Grade II listed buildings in Liverpool-L3 =

Liverpool is a city and port in Merseyside, England, which contains many listed buildings. A listed building is a structure designated by English Heritage of being of architectural and/or of historical importance and, as such, is included in the National Heritage List for England. There are three grades of listing, according to the degree of importance of the structure. Grade I includes those buildings that are of "exceptional interest, sometimes considered to be internationally important"; the buildings in Grade II* are "particularly important buildings of more than special interest"; and those in Grade II are "nationally important and of special interest". Very few buildings are included in Grade I — only 2.5% of the total. Grade II* buildings represent 5.5% of the total, while the great majority, 92%, are included in Grade II.

Liverpool contains more than 1,550 listed buildings, of which 28 are in Grade I, 109 in Grade II*, and the rest in Grade II. (Note: These figures are taken from a search in the National Heritage List for England in May 2013, and are subject to variation as further buildings are listed, grades are revised, or buildings are delisted.) This list contains the Grade II listed buildings in the L3 postal district of Liverpool. The area covered by this postal district comprises a varied infrastructure.

It is bounded to the west by the River Mersey, along which are a series of docks, no longer used for their original purpose of transporting cargo. These are centred on what has become an area of tourist attractions, the Pier Head and Albert Dock. The dockland area stretches to the north as far as Wellington Dock, and to the south to Brunswick Dock. The listed buildings associated with the docks include their retaining walls, sea walls, graving docks, warehouses, gates, huts, and structures providing hydraulic power. Moving inland, the area covers most of the commercial district of the city, and the southern end of the residential districts of Vauxhall and Everton. Streets covered in the district include Mount Pleasant, up to the area of the University of Liverpool, and along London Road and Pembroke Place to the Royal Infirmary. The listed buildings in these areas include offices, residential buildings, a former convent, a hospital, memorials, a school, and university buildings.

Grade II listed buildings from other areas in the city can be found through the box on the right, along with the lists of the Grade I and Grade II* buildings in the city.

== Buildings ==
| Name | Location | Photograph | Built | Notes |
|---|---|---|---|---|
| Hydraulic pumping station | Albert Dock; 53.4018°N 2.9921°W | | 1878 | A gabled engine house and accumulator tower with a chimney, designed by George Fosbery Lyster. It is in brick with stone dressings and has a slate roof. It was converted in 1986 to a public house. |
| Swing bridge | Albert Dock; 53.40125°N 2.99399°W | | c. 1846 | An iron swing bridge designed by Jesse Hartley. It consists of two leaves forming a segmental arch; the leaves are now fixed. |
| Dockmaster's House | Albert Pierhead; 53.40125°N 2.99458°W | | 1852–53 | A brick house with stone dressings and a hipped slate roof. It has three storeys, and is in three bays. The windows are sashes. Along the top of the house is a wooden cornice supported by stone corbels. |
| Dockmaster's Office | Albert Pierhead; 53.40117°N 2.99452°W | | c. 1846 | A brick office with stone dressings and a hipped slate roof. It is in a single storey, with bays on the front and one bay at the sides. It is a simple building with two sash windows, and two entrances. |
| Gate piers | Albert Pierhead; 53.40107°N 2.99426°W | | c. 1846 | Rusticated stone gate piers at the entrance to Albert Dock. |
| Workshop | Albert Pierhead; 53.40113°N 2.99422°W | | 1846 | This originated as a cooperage, and was later used as a workshop. It is a brick building with stone dressings, and has a roof with an iron structure. It has two storeys, and is in six bays, with casement windows, and two entrances. |
| Ashton Building | Ashton Street; 53.4065°N 2.9664°W | | 1913 | A building, initially for the Faculty of Arts of the university, by Briggs, Wolstenholme and Thornley, in Neoclassical style. It is in brick and Portland stone, with four storeys, and in nine bays. On the Ashton Street face are large Ionic fluted pilasters and a frieze. At the top is a bold cornice and a central pediment. On each side of the pediment is a balustered parapet and a pair of sphinxes. On the other face is a sculpture of a group of figures under a pediment. |
| Gate | Bath Street; 53.41222°N 2.99929°W | | 1830s | Located opposite Roberts Street, this was part of the docks complex. It is a former gate, now blocked with a brick wall. It consists of a pair of granite piers with Doric caps. |
| Hydraulic tower | Bramley-Moore Dock; 53.42570°N 3.00034°W | | 1883 | A hydraulic tower by George Fosbery Lyster. It consists of an engine house, an accumulator tower, and a truncated octagonal chimney. The engine house is in brick, with a slate roof and round-headed windows and entrances. The tower has a pyramidal roof; the cap of the chimney is missing. |
| Retaining walls | Bramley-Moore Dock; 53.42439°N 3.00332°W | — | 1848 | Designed by Jesse Hartley, these are in granite rubble. They also include the entrances to Sandon Half Tide and Nelson Docks. In 2021-22, Bramley-Moore Dock was filled to make way for Everton's new stadium. As such, the majority of the retaining walls are now buried beneath the stadium complex, though care was taken to ensure their protection should they be excavated in future. |
| Victoria Building | Brownlow Hill; 53.4061°N 2.9667°W | | 1889–92 | Designed in Gothic style by Alfred Waterhouse, this was the first major building for what became the University of Liverpool. It is built in brick with terracotta dressings, and has a slate roof. There are three storeys with attics; it has 13 bays on Brownlow Hill and five on Ashton Street. At the corner is an octagonal turret with a conical spire. In the ninth bay is a four-stage clock tower with pinnacles and spirelets. |
| Gatekeeper's Hut, north of entrance | Brunswick Half Tide Dock; 53.38870°N 2.98639°W | | 1832 (?) | An octagonal stone building with deep eaves and a corbelled roof. It contains seven windows and an entrance, and has a stone finial. |
| Gatekeeper's Hut, south of entrance | Brunswick Half Tide Dock; 53.38841°N 2.98626°W | | 1832 (?) | An octagonal stone building with deep eaves and a corbelled roof. It contains seven windows and an entrance, and has an urn finial. |
| Number 1 Graving Dock | Canning Dock; 53.40270°N 2.99395°W | | 1765 | The graving dock was lengthened in 1813, and deepened by Jesse Hartley in 1842. Its stepped walls are in sandstone and granite, with granite coping and bollards. |
| Number 2 Graving Dock | Canning Dock; 53.40230°N 2.99338°W | | 1765 | The graving dock was lengthened in 1813, and deepened by Jesse Hartley in 1842. Its stepped walls are in sandstone and granite, with granite coping and bollards. |
| Retaining wall | Canning Dock; 53.40264°N 2.99094°W | | c. 1737 | The northwest wall was built as a pier in stone. The rest followed in about 1845, designed by Jesse Hartley, and constructed in granite. |
| Swing bridge | Canning Dock; 53.40207°N 2.99224°W | | c. 1845 | The swing bridge was designed by Jesse Hartley. It is an iron bridge in two halves, with granite housing at both ends, and has segmental girders. |
| Retaining walls | Canning Half Tide Dock; 53.40205°N 2.99420°W | | 1844 | Designed by Jesse Hartley. They consist of granite rubble in blocks of differing sizes. |
| Retaining walls, South Ferry Basin | Canning Half Tide Dock; 53.4016°N 2.9932°W | | 1821 | Sandstone retaining dock walls with granite copings, and an opening to the river. |
| Watchman's Hut (north) | Canning Half Tide Dock; 53.40208°N 2.99511°W | | 1844 | An octagonal stone building designed by Jesse Hartley in granite. It has a corbelled roof with an urn finial. It contains seven chamfered windows and an entrance. |
| Watchman's Hut (south) | Canning Half Tide Dock; 53.40153°N 2.99486°W | | 1844 | An octagonal stone building designed by Jesse Hartley in granite. It has a corbelled roof with an urn finial. It contains seven sash windows and an entrance. |
| Watchman's Hut | Canning Island; 53.40179°N 2.99514°W | | 1844 | An octagonal stone building designed by Jesse Hartley in granite. It has a corbelled roof with a chimney. It contains seven chamfered windows and an entrance. |
| Sea wall | Canning Island; 53.40184°N 2.99522°W | | 1844 | Designed by Jesse Hartley. It consists of granite rubble in blocks of differing sizes. |
| Sea wall to north | Canning Island; 53.40220°N 2.99577°W | | 1844 | Designed by Jesse Hartley. It consists of granite rubble in blocks of differing sizes. |
| Sea wall to south | Canning Island; 53.40140°N 2.99506°W | | 1844 | Designed by Jesse Hartley. It consists of granite rubble in blocks of differing sizes. |
| Gate | Clarence Dock; 53.41891°N 3.00019°W | | 1830s | Designed by Jesse Hartley, this consists of a pair of stone gate piers. They have rusticated bases, and gabled caps with acroteria. |
| Gate | Clarence and graving docks 53.42008°N 3.00035°W | | 1830s | Designed by Jesse Hartley, this consists of a pair of stone gate piers. They have rusticated bases, and gabled caps with acroteria. |
| Graving docks | Clarence Dock; 53.4203°N 3.00184°W | | c. 1830 | Two graving docks by Jesse Hartley with stepped sides in stone and granite. |
| — | 21A, 21–29 Clarence Street; 53.4045°N 2.9727°W | | Early 19th century | A terrace of five brick houses with stone dressings and slate roofs. They have three storeys and basements, and each house has three bays. There is a moulded cornice at the top. The windows are sashes with wedge lintels, and the round-arched doorways have Doric doorcases. |
| — | 33 Clarence Street; 53.4041°N 2.9726°W | | Early 19th century | A brick house with stone dressings and a slate roof. It is in three bays, with a cornice at the top. All the windows have wedge lintels; those in the central bay are blind, the others are sashes. |
| — | 36 Clarence Street; 53.40403°N 2.97288°W | | Early 19th century | A brick shop with stone dressings and a slate roof. It has three storeys, and is in three bays, with a cornice at the top. In the ground floor is the original doorcase. Above are sash windows with wedge lintels. |
| Retaining walls | Collingwood Dock; 53.42228°N 3.00146°W | | 1848 | Designed by Jesse Hartley, it consists of granite rubble incorporating some bricks. There are entrances to Stanley and Collingwood Docks. |
| Retaining walls | Duke's Dock; 53.3987°N 2.9911°W | | 1773 | Built for the 3rd Duke of Bridgewater, and extended with a half tide dock in 1841–45. It is constructed in sandstone and patched with brick. These are the only 18th-century dock walls in Liverpool. |
| New Quay Ventilation Station | Fazakerley Street; 53.4083°N 2.9951°W | | 1931–34 | This is a brick block containing offices and two towers with fans to ventilate the Mersey Road Tunnel. It was designed by Herbert J. Rowse, and built by Basil Mott in association with J. A. Brodie. The towers are decorated in geometrical brick work and copper. |
| Church of St Mary of the Angels | Fox Street; 53.4158°N 2.9760°W | | 1907–10 | A Roman Catholic church designed by Pugin and Pugin, now redundant. It is in Italian Renaissance style, constructed in brick with sandstone dressings, and has a slate roof. Included in the listing are the attached friary, arch, bell frame, walls, railings, and gates. |
| Memorial of Sir Alfred Lewis Jones, Liverpool | George's Pier Head; 53.40390°N 2.99647°W | | 1913 | George Frampton designed the memorial to Alfred Lewis Jones, shipowner and founder of the Liverpool School of Tropical Medicine. It consists of a stone base and plinth, the latter with a medallion containing a bronze bust and a laurel wreath. Beside this are statues representing the allegories of Research, and the Fruits of Industry. On top of the plinth is a female figure carrying a ship. |
| Cunard War Memorial | George's Pier Head; 53.40492°N 2.99611°W | | 1923 | A memorial to the First and Second World Wars designed by Arthur J. Davis. It stands on a granite pedestal, and consists of a column carrying the naked figure of Victory standing on a shop's prow carrying a laurel wreath. The shaft of the column is decorated with the beaks of ships. The figure was executed by Henry Pegram. |
| Edward VII Monument | George's Pier Head; 53.40474°N 2.99667°W | | c. 1911 | Designed by William Goscombe John, this is a statue of Edward VII. It is a bronze statue of the king seated on a horse, which stands on a rectangular stone pedestal. |
| Pillar box | Gower Street, Salthouse Dock; 53.39967°N 2.99040°W | | 1863 | A type of pillar box in use in Liverpool in 1863. It is in cast iron, is cylindrical, and stands on a plinth. It has a horizontal slot, and a frieze including the words "Post Office". The top is octagonal, and is surmounted by a crown. |
| — | 55 Great Crosshall Street; 53.4113°N 2.9843°W | | 1850 | Built as St John's National School, and designed by John Hay in Gothic style, it was later used as warehouses. It is built in stone with a slate roof. The building has three storeys, and is in seven bays. The ground floor has two entrances. The first floor has a trefoil-headed arcade containing pairs of lancet windows. The ground floor was originally arcaded, but this has been filled in. |
| Bonded Tea Warehouse | Great Howard Street; 53.4196°N 2.9976°W | | c. 1880 (?) | A brick warehouse with six storeys and a basement, and in twelve bays. At the top is a cornice and a parapet. On the Great Howard Street face is a carved and painted shield depicting a coat of arms. Along the Dickson Street are ten loading bays. |
| Central Fire Station | Hatton Garden; 53.4096°N 2.9863°W | | 1895–98 | A fire station and offices designed by Thomas Shelmerdine in Jacobean style. It is in brick with stone dressings and partial facing, and has a slate roof. It is a symmetrical building with three storeys and an attic. The main front has 18 bays, and a cornice runs along the top of the building. All the windows are mullioned and transomed. Other features include a three-stage tower, oriel windows, pediments, dormers, and a balustraded balcony. |
| Merseyside Transport Offices | Hatton Garden; 53.4101°N 2.9864°W | | 1906–07 | Built as the City Tramway Offices, and designed by Thomas Shelmerdine in Neoclassical style. It is in brick with stone facing to the ground floor and stone dressings. There are four storeys and a basement, with an attic added in the 1930s. It is in 13 bays, nine of which are symmetrical. This section contains paired rusticated Tuscan columns, a frieze, and a pediment with the arms of Liverpool. Now, occupied by the Richmond aparthotel. |
| Casemates and Steps | Herculaneum Dock; 53.38029°N 2.97043°W | | 1881 | These consist of 60 barrel vaulted chambers cut into rock, with a concrete facing, which were designed to be used for storage. At the entrances are iron doors between pilaster strips. On the right side is a sandstone dog-leg flight of steps. |
| — | 2 Islington Square; 53.4121°N 2.9681°W | | 1830s | Built as a music academy, used later as a warehouse. It is a stuccoed building, in two storeys, with five bays. The ground floor is rusticated, with roundels, and has sash windows. In the first floor are casement windows, and cast iron balconies that incorporate lyres in their design. At the ends of the first floor are pilasters supporting an entablature at the top of the building. |
| — | 3 Islington Square; 53.4121°N 2.9682°W | | Early 19th century | A brick house with stone dressings and a slate roof. It has three storeys and a basement. On the front and back are five bays, with four bays on the side; to the left is a two-bay extension. The windows are sashes. At the top of the building is a pediment with an elliptical-headed window. Three steps lead up to a central entrance with a Greek Doric portico. |
| Lamp post | Limekiln Lane; 53.41764°N 2.98472°W | — | 1910–11 | A lamp post built as part of the Eldon Grove development. It is in cast iron, and formerly incorporated drinking fountains. Rising from an ornamented base are fluted columns with two arms it stands on a high square plinth. |
| George III Monument | London Road; 53.40921°N 2.97298°W | | 1822 | A bronze statue on a stone plinth by Richard Westmacott. It depicts king George III wearing Roman dress, sitting on a horse. |
| Former Liverpool Furnishing Company showroom | 104 and 106 London Road; 53.40907°N 2.97359°W | | 1899 | The sales showroom, later a bank, stands on a corner site, and is in terracotta and brick with a slate roof. There are three storeys and attics, with three bays on London Road, five on Hart Street, and an angled splayed bay on the corner. Also on the corner is a two-stage octagonal clock tower with an ogee copper dome. |
| Prince of Wales Public House | 225 and 227 London Road; 53.4105°N 2.9680°W | | 1870s | A stone public house with a slate roof. It is in three storeys, and has a curved front of six bays. There are entrances in the end bays with pointed arches above which are niches containing statues of the Prince and Princess of Wales. |
| — | 9–15 Lord Nelson Street; 53.4085°N 2.9765°W | | Early 19th century | A terrace of four brick houses, some of which are stuccoed, with slate roofs. They are in three storeys with a basement, and each house has two bays. The windows have wedge lintels, and most are sashes, the others being casements. The round-headed entrances have Doric doorcases with open pediments. |
| Former Owenite Hall of Science | 17 Lord Nelson Street; 53.4085°N 2.9759°W | | 1840 | A stuccoed building, originally a warehouse. It has three storeys, and is in six bays. The ground floor contains two round-arched entrances, three round-arched windows, and a carriage entrance. Above this is a sash window. Along the top of the building is a cornice and a plain parapet. |
| — | 19–33 Lord Nelson Street, 12A St Vincent Street; 53.4085°N 2.9754°W | | Early 19th century | A terrace of nine brick houses with slate roofs. They are in three storeys with a basement, and each house has two bays. The windows have wedge lintels, and most are sashes, the others being casements. The round-headed entrances have Doric doorcases with friezes and open pediments. |
| Pumping station | Mann Island; 53.4040°N 2.9932°W | | 1881 | The pumping station was built for the Mersey Railway and designed by Grayson and Ould. It is a brick building with a hipped slate roof. There is a central round-headed entrance with a rusticated stone arch, and blind arcading. At the top of the building is a dentilled cornice. |
| Sea wall | Marine Parade; 53.39982°N 2.99427°W | — | c. 1846 | A granite wall designed by Jesse Hartley, it runs for 330 metres from Albert Dock to Gower Street. There are two sets of steps, one at the south end, the other halfway along. |
| Monument | Mount Pleasant; 53.40441°N 2.97623°W | | 1905 | Located in Roscoe Gardens, the monument marks the site of the graveyard of the Renshaw Street Unitarian Chapel. It was designed by Ronald P. Jones, and consists of eight Tuscan columns on a base of three steps. These support a dome, and inside is a square inscribed stone. |
| — | 50 Mount Pleasant; 53.4041°N 2.9754°W | | Late 18th century | A brick house with stone dressings and a slate roof. The building has three storeys with a stone basement, and is in five bays. The windows are sashes with wedge lintels. The central doorcase is bowed, and has an open pediment and a semicircular fanlight. |
| — | 52 (east) Mount Pleasant; 53.4040°N 2.9750°W | | Late 18th century | A house, altered in the 19th century, and used as an office. It is in brick with stone dressings and a slate roof. The building is in two storeys with a basement and an attic. It is in five bays, and has two bay windows. In the attic is a casement window; the other windows are sashes with wedge lintels. The central entrance has a Tuscan porch. |
| — | 52 (west) Mount Pleasant; 53.4040°N 2.9751°W | | Late 18th century | A house, later an office. It is in brick with stone dressings and a slate roof. It is in three storeys with a projecting basement, and is in three bays. The windows are sashes with wedge lintels. |
| — | 54 Mount Pleasant; 53.4040°N 2.9749°W | | Mid 19th century | A house, later part of an office. It is in brick with stone dressings and a slate roof. There are two storeys, and it is in two bays. In the ground floor is a canted bay window. The other windows are sashes. |
| Young Men's Christian Association Building | 56–60 Mount Pleasant; 53.4039°N 2.9747°W | | 1874–77 | Built for the Young Men's Christian Association, the building was designed by H. H. Vale in 13th-century Gothic style. It is in brick, with sandstone dressings, and has a slate roof. It has two storeys and an attic, with ten bays at the front and two bays at the sides. To the left of centre is a tower. |
| — | 62 Mount Pleasant; 53.4038°N 2.9743°W | | 1767 | The oldest house in the street, built for the merchant William Rice. It is in brick with stone dressings and a slate roof. There are two storeys and it has five bays, with a cornice. The windows are sashes with wedge lintels and triple keystones. The central entrance has an open pediment. |
| — | 64 Mount Pleasant; 53.4038°N 2.9741°W | | Late 18th century | A brick house with stone dressings and a slate roof. It is in three storeys and has three bays, with a cornice at the top of the house. The windows are sashes with wedge lintels. The central entrance has a Doric doorcase. |
| — | 64A and 66 Mount Pleasant; 53.4038°N 2.9739°W | | Late 18th century | A brick house with stone dressings and a slate roof. No 64A has three storeys and is in a single bay, with a shop window. No 66 has four storeys with a basement, and is in four bays. The windows have wedge lintels, and are a mix of sashes and casements. The house has an Ionic porch with fluted columns, a frieze, and a dentilled cornice. |
| — | 68 Mount Pleasant; 53.4038°N 2.9735°W | | c. 1788 | A house built for the merchant George Dunbar, in brick with stone dressings and a slate roof. It is in three storeys with a basement, and has five bays. The windows are sashes with wedge lintels. The central three bays break forward, and contain a doorway with Tuscan columns, a frieze, a dentilled cornice and a pediment. The doorway and frieze are decorated with musical instruments, and cherubs with a globe and compasses. |
| — | 73–79 Mount Pleasant; 53.4040°N 2.9737°W | | Late 18th century | A terrace of four brick houses with stone dressings and a slate roof. They are in three storeys with basements. No 79 also has an attic and is in four bays; the other houses each have two bays. The windows have wedge lintels; most are sashes other than one casement. The doorcases have fluted Doric columns. Nos 75 and 79 have balconies. No 73 now serves as student accommodation. |
| — | 76–80 Mount Pleasant; 53.4037°N 2.9723°W | | Late 18th century | A terrace of three brick houses with stone dressings and a slate roof. They are in three storeys with basements, and each house has two bays. The windows have wedge lintels; most are sashes other than one casement. Two of the houses have first floor balconies. The doorcases have fluted Doric columns. |
| — | 81 and 83 Mount Pleasant; 53.4040°N 2.9735°W | | Late 18th century | A pair of brick houses with a slate roof. They are in three storeys and a basement, and each house has two bays, with a cornice at the top of the house. The windows have wedge lintels, and most are sashes. The entrances have Doric aedicules and open pediments. |
| — | 85 and 87 Mount Pleasant; 53.4040°N 2.9733°W | | Late 18th century | A pair of brick houses with a slate roof. They are in three storeys and a basement, and each house has two bays. The windows are sashes with wedge lintels. The round-headed paired entrances have Doric aedicules and open pediments. |
| — | 89 and 91 Mount Pleasant; 53.4040°N 2.9732°W | | Late 18th century | A pair of brick houses with a slate roof. They are in three storeys and a basement, and each house has two bays. The windows are casements with wedge lintels. No 91 has a first floor balcony. |
| Notre Dame Convent (part) and Chapel | 92 Mount Pleasant; 53.4036°N 2.9713°W | | 1857 | The convent was designed by Charles Hansom, and the chapel by Matthew E. and Charles Hadfield was added to the rear in 1865–67. The convent is essentially Georgian in style, and the chapel is Gothic. Both are in brick with slate roofs, and the entrance face is in five bays. The building has later been used by the Liverpool John Moores University. |
| — | 93 and 95 Mount Pleasant; 53.4040°N 2.9730°W | | Late 18th century | A pair of brick houses with a slate roof. They are in three storeys and a basement, and each house has two bays, with a cornice at the top of the house. The windows are sashes with wedge lintels. The entrances have Doric aedicules and open pediments. No 95 has a shop front. |
| — | 95A Mount Pleasant; 53.4040°N 2.9729°W | | Late 18th century | A brick house with a slate roof, in three storeys. There are four bays on Mount Pleasant, and three on Clarence Street. In the ground floor is a shop front. The windows in the upper storeys are sashes. |
| — | 96 Mount Pleasant; 53.4035°N 2.9709°W | | Late 18th century | A brick house with stone dressings and a slate roof. It is in three storeys, and has five bays. The windows are sashes with wedge lintels. The stone doorcase has Doric columns, a frieze, and a pediment. |
| — | 97 and 99 Mount Pleasant, 35 Clarence Street; 53.4039°N 2.9725°W | | Late 18th century | Two brick shops with slate roofs, in three storeys. Each has two bays on Mount Pleasant, and there are two bays on Clarence Street. The windows are a mix of sashes and casements, and all have wedge lintels. |
| — | 101–107 Mount Pleasant; 53.4039°N 2.9723°W | | Late 18th century | A block of four brick shops with slate roofs, in three storeys. They each have two bays, other than No 107 which has one. A cornice runs along the top of the block. Other than the shop fronts, the windows are sashes. |
| — | 109–125 Mount Pleasant; 53.4039°N 2.9714°W | | Early 19th century | A terrace of nine brick houses with slate roofs. They are in three storeys and a basement, and each house has three bays. The windows are sashes with wedge lintels. The round-headed entrances have Ionic doorcases. The ground floors of some of the houses are plastered. |
| Retaining walls | Nelson Dock; 53.42327°N 3.00514°W | — | 1848 | Designed by Jesse Hartley, and consisting of granite rubble. There are entrances to Bramley-Moore and Salisbury Docks. |
| Queensway Tunnel, entrance | New Quay; 53.4072°N 2.9953°W | | 1925–34 | The entrance to the tunnel was designed by Herbert J. Rowse, and is constructed in Portland stone. There are plaques above the arched entrance and on the right curving wall. |
| Warehouse | 13 North Street; 53.4098°N 2.9851°W | | c, 1882 | Late C19th warehouse in brick with cast iron columns and fittings. |
| Warehouse | 15 North Street; 53.4099°N 2.9853°W | | c, 1875 | Late C19th warehouse, unusual for the period in not being fireproofed. Brick with blue-brick bands, metal-framed windows with an off-centre loading bay with timber doors. |
| Cotton Exchange Building | Old Hall Street; 53.4091°N 2.9934°W | | 1905–06 | The Neoclassical front and the main exchange hall were demolished in 1967–69, and replaced by a modern front and a courtyard, leaving the original sides and back unchanged. The building has seven storeys, and the front is in 21 bays. The original features remaining include decorative cast iron panels, Portland stone facing on the back and, internally, a colonnade of Norwegian granite monoliths. |
| Harley Buildings | 11 Old Hall Street; 53.4085°N 2.9934°W | — | 1860 | An office building in ashlar stone with a granite basement. It has four storeys with a basement, and is in seven bays. At the ends are pilasters with pedimented finials. The windows in the ground floor are casements; the others are sashes. The entrance is flanked by flat pilasters. |
| City Buildings | 21–23 Old Hall Street; 53.4087°N 2.9938°W | | 19th century | An office building, stuccoed, with large iron framed windows, inserted in about 1906–08 by Frederick G. Fraser. There are two bays on Old Hall Street, three bays on Fazakerley Street, and a curved corner bay between them. |
| — | 91 and 93 Old Hall Street; 53.4107°N 2.9962°W | | c. 1800 | Two houses, later incorporated into a hospital, in brick with stone dressings, and slate roofs. They are in two storeys and have five bays, with a cornice at the top. The windows are sashes with wedge lintels, and the entrances are round-headed. |
| Lombard Chambers | 12 Ormond Street; 53.4092°N 2.9922°W | | 1860s | An office building in brick with stone dressings. It has three storeys, with a basement and an attic. There are three bays on Ormond Street, and five on Bixteth Street. The architectural style is Venetian Gothic. |
| Liverpool Royal Infirmary | Pembroke Place; 53.4082°N 2.9677°W | | 1887–90 | The hospital was designed by Alfred Waterhouse, replacing an earlier infirmary. It consists of an administrative block facing Pembroke Place, with six ward blocks and a chapel behind it. The hospital is built in brick with terracotta dressings, and has a slate roof. The symmetrical entrance front is in four storeys and an attic, and extends for eleven bays. Its design includes Romanesque and Gothic features. |
| — | 12 Pembroke Place; 53.4087°N 2.9711°W | | Early 19th century | A brick house with stone dressings and a slate roof. It is in two storeys with a basement, and has three bays, with a cornice at the top of the house. The windows are sashes with wedge lintels. The central round-headed entrance has a Doric doorcase. |
| — | 35–39 Pembroke Place; 53.4089°N 2.9691°W | — | Early to mid 1840s | This consists of three houses, two semi-detached, and one single, with extensions to the rear. They are in brick, with sandstone dressings, and slate roofs. All have three storeys, and are one bay wide. The rear extensions are rare survivals of part of the "court houses" built to accommodate the poor in the 19th century. |
| Pleasant Street Board School | Pleasant Street; 53.40455°N 2.97404°W | | 1818 | School and attached office, formerly school and master's house. 1818, extended 1851, with further alterations and extensions in 1889 and 1894. Red brick laid to Flemish bond with ashlar sandstone dressings, moulded eaves cornice beneath a slate roof covering laid to diminishing courses. Brick chimney stacks, 2 mid slope to west gable, 1 ridge stack and 2 front wall stacks. Linear plan, with main frontage to Pleasant Street, and with integral staff accommodation at west end, returning onto Green Lane |
| Barclays Bank | 1 Prescot Street, 2 Moss Street; 53.4105°N 2.9676°W | | 1904 | Designed as a branch of the Bank of Liverpool by James F. Doyle in Edwardian Baroque style. It is built in Portland stone, with a granite ground floor, and a slate Mansard roof. It has three storeys and an attic. There is one bay on Prescot Street, and five on Moss Street, with a canted bay on the corner. Also on the corner is an octagonal tower, and on the Prescot Street face is a Venetian window. |
| Boundary wall | Prince's Dock; 53.41028°N 2.99858°W | — | 1821 | Designed by John Foster as a boundary wall to prevent theft. It is in brick with sandstone copings, and is 18 feet (5.5 m) high. |
| Gates | Prince's Dock; 53.41124°N 2.99913°W | — | 1821 | Designed by John Foster, the gate piers remain. They are in stone, are rusticated, and have panels and caps. |
| Gates to Docks 24, 27 and 28 | Prince's Dock; 53.41124°N 2.99913°W | — | 1821 | Designed by John Foster, the gate piers remain. They are in granite with Doric caps. The left pier is larger, with a window and an entrance, forming a gatekeeper's hut. |
| Entrance | Prince's Half-Tide Dock; 53.41321°N 2.99928°W | — | 1840s | The dock entrance was designed by Jesse Hartley, and is in granite. There are two remaining capstans. |
| Retaining walls | Prince's Half-Tide Dock; 53.41216°N 2.99970°W | — | Early 1840s | The walls were designed by Jesse Hartley, are in granite rubble, and include steps. |
| Thompson Yates, Johnston and George Holt Buildings | The Quadrangle; 53.4070°N 2.9667°W | | 1894–1904 | A group of buildings for the University of Liverpool, designed by Alfred Waterhouse (his last works), and completed by his son, Paul. They are in brick with terracotta dressings, and have slate roofs. The buildings include lecture rooms, offices and laboratories. They are mainly in three storeys with a basement, and have varied roof-lines. |
| Nautilus House | 6–10 Rumford Place; 53.4081°N 2.9942°W | | c. 1840 | An office building in partly stuccoed brick with stone dressings and a slate roof. It has three storeys and is in nine bays. All the windows are sashes. There is a central cart entrance with pilasters and an entablature. It was the office of the Confederate agent James Dunwoody Bulloch. |
| — | 24 and 26 St Anne Street; 53.4120°N 2.9762°W | — | Early 19th century | Originally a pair of houses, later used as a warehouse and public house. They are in brick with a slate roof; No 24 is stuccoed. The houses are in three storeys with a basement, and each house has three bays. No 24 has a bay window. The other windows are sashes with wedge lintels. |
| — | 34–36 St Anne Street; 53.4149°N 2.9783°W | | Early 19th century | A pair of stuccoed houses with a slate roof. They are in three storeys with a basement, and each house has three bays. Most of the windows are sashes. No. 34 has a Doric doorcase and a decorated frieze. No. 36 has Italianate stucco features, and a large stucco doorcase with a pediment. |
| Warehouse | St Anne Street; 53.4123°N 2.9762°W | — | Mid 19th century | Originally the warehouse of Owen and T. J. Hughes, later used as a residence, an office, carriage works and a showroom. It is in brick and stucco on an iron frame. There are three storeys and an attic, and it is in seven bays. The windows are a mix of sashes and casements. Other features include an iron balcony, small fluted iron columns and a cornice at the top of the building. |
| Block of flats | St Andrew's Gardens; 53.4080°N 2.9719°W | | Mid 1930s | A semicircular block of flats, with a connecting range, designed by Lancelot Keay. They are in brick with concrete dressings, and have a tiled roof. The flats are in five storeys, the main block having 61 bays, and the other range with 19 bays. In the ground floor are large round archways, and on the interior faces are continuous balconies. |
| Dockmaster's House | Salisbury Dock; 53.42222°N 3.00505°W | — | c. 1848 | Designed by Jesse Hartley, it is a brick building with stone dressings and a slate hipped roof; its west face is rendered. The house has three storeys. Its west face has two bays with canted bays on the corners, and two bays on each side. On the south side is a brick porch. |
| Dockmaster's Office | Salisbury Dock; 53.42074°N 3.00524°W | — | 1848 | Designed by Jesse Hartley, it is constructed in granite rubble. There are two storeys, with three bays on the front, and a single bay at the sides. There are entrances on all sides. Its summit is battlemented. |
| Retaining wall | Salisbury Dock; 53.42194°N 3.00301°W | — | 1848 | Designed by Jesse Hartley in granite rubble. It includes the entrances to Trafalgar, Collingwood, and Nelson Docks. |
| Sea wall | Island at entrance to dock, Salisbury Dock; 53.42151°N 3.00521°W | — | 1848 | Designed by Jesse Hartley, the sea wall consists of granite rubble with a coping. |
| Sea wall | North Island, Salisbury Dock; 53.42210°N 3.00551°W | — | 1848 | Designed by Jesse Hartley, the sea wall consists of granite rubble with a coping. |
| Sea wall | South of Salisbury Dock; 53.42058°N 3.00543°W | — | 1848 | Designed by Jesse Hartley, the sea wall consists of granite rubble with a coping. |
| Victoria Tower | Salisbury Dock; 53.42155°N 3.00495°W | | 1847–48 | A Gothic clock tower designed by Jesse Hartley. It is in granite, the lower part round, and the upper part hexagonal. There are clock faces on all sides, above which is an elongated belfry stage. At the top is a projecting castellated parapet. |
| Saint Francis Xavier's School | Salisbury Street; 53.4124°N 2.9695°W | | 1856 | The main part of the school was built in 1876–77, designed by Henry Clutton. It is in brick and terracotta with a slate roof. A range of classrooms faces Salisbury Street, and behind is a parallel range consisting of an assembly and examination room. The front range has two storeys and an attic, and is in nine bays. Along the top of the building are dormers with gables flanked by pinnacles. In 1999 it was converted into the Cornerstone building of Liverpool Hope University. |
| Retaining walls | Salthouse Dock; 53.40087°N 2.98918°W | | 1841 | Designed by Jesse Hartley in granite rubble. They include the entrances to Albert and Canning Docks. |
| — | 1 Springfield; 53.4120°N 2.9762°W | — | Early 19th century | A brick house with stone dressings and a hipped slate roof. It has three storeys and a basement. There are five bays on Springfield and two bays on St Anne Street. The windows are sashes with wedge lintels. One of the doorways has Doric columns, a cornice, and a semicircular fanlight. |
| Carriage ramps and steps | Sefton Street; 53.38066°N 2.97322°W | | 1866 | The ramps and steps led to a bridge over the Cheshire Lines railway, which has been demolished. They are in stone and include a central niche with a horse trough, flanking niches with dog bowls, and urinals with slate cladding and partitions. On the top is a balustrade with lamp standards and with panels containing liver birds. |
| Hydraulic Station, Toxteth Dock | Sefton Street; 53.3857°N 2.9796°W | | 1889–90 | An accumulator tower and a shed in brick. The tower has an octagonal chimney and a saddleback roof. The shed is in two bays, and has pedimented gables at the ends. Now Red Cross offices as Bradbury House. |
| Customs Depot | Sefton Street; 53.3859°N 2.9798°W | | 1890 | A brick building with a slate roof, in two storeys and an attic. It has two bays. In the attic are gabled dormers. The other windows are sashes. |
| — | 11–53 Seymour Street; 53.4086°N 2.9734°W | | c. 1810 | A long terrace of brick houses with stone dressings and a slate roof. It is in three storeys with basements, and each house has two bays. All the windows have wedge lintels, and most are sashes. |
| Canal entrance | Stanley Dock; 53.42170°N 2.99677°W | | 1848 | The entrance from Stanley Dock to four locks leading to the Leeds and Liverpool Canal, consisting of granite retaining walls and a bridge. |
| North Gate | Victoria, Prince's, and Waterloo Docks; 53.41525°N 2.99950°W | | 1830s | Designed by Jesse Hartley, this consists of a pair of stone gate piers. They have rusticated bases, and gabled caps with acroteria. |
| South Gate | Victoria, Prince's, and Waterloo Docks; 53.41322°N 2.99924°W | | 1830s | Designed by Jesse Hartley, this consists of a central hut, and piers at the sides. The piers are in granite, with rusticated bases, and Doric gabled caps and acroteria. |
| Hydraulic Tower | Wapping; 53.39627°N 2.98614°W | | 1856 | A hydraulic tower by Jesse Hartley. It is an octagonal structure in brick with rusticated stone quoins, standing on a granite base, and with a battlemented parapet. Behind it is a granite block with doors and windows, and a brick gable. |
| Retaining walls | Wapping Basin; 53.39879°N 2.98856°W | | 1855 | The retaining walls were designed by Jesse Hartley in granite rubble. There are entrances to Salthouse, Duke's and Wapping Docks. |
| Gatekeeper's Lodge | Wapping Dock; 53.39637°N 2.98573°W | | 1856 | Built in granite and designed by Jesse Hartley, the lodge has an oval plan and sloping sides. It is surmounted by a conical roof, which is also oval in plan, and a chimney. The lodge contains an entrance, a window, a gate slot, and a motif in the form of an arrow slit. |
| Waterloo Warehouse | Waterloo Road; 53.4142°N 2.9998°W | | 1866–68 | The grain warehouse was designed by George Fosbery Lyster. It is constructed in brick with an arcaded granite ground floor. The building is six storeys high. with 45 bays on the long sides, and five on the short sides. The ground floor is rusticated. There are five hoist bays, two of which rise higher, with pedimented gable. The warehouse was converted into apartments between 1989 and 1998, when hipped roofs were added. |
| Gate, Victoria and Trafalgar Docks | Waterloo Road; 53.41591°N 2.99980°W | | 1836 | Only the gate piers remain. There were designed by Jesse Hartley, and are in granite. They have rusticated bases, and gabled tops with acroteria. |
| Gate, Waterloo Dock | Waterloo Road; 53.41480°N 2.99950°W | | 1830s | Only the gate piers remain. There were designed by Jesse Hartley, and are in granite with Doric caps. With a window and entrance, the pier on the left forms a gatekeeper's hut. |
| Warehouse | 68 Waterloo Road; 53.4172°N 2.9995°W | | 1842–44 | One of the earliest fire-proof warehouses in Liverpool. It is in brick, with three bays on Waterloo Road surmounted by a pedimented gable, and nine on Vulcan Street. Many original features have survived, including the brick-vaulted ceilings, the tiled floors, cast iron supporting columns and beams, lintels and sills, and the original enclosed fireproof staircase. |
| Hydraulic Tower | Wellington Dock; 53.42571°N 3.00032°W | — | 1883 | A hydraulic tower in brick. It has a round-headed entrance, narrow windows, a panelled frieze, a pyramidal roof, and a truncated octagonal chimney. |

== See also ==
Architecture of Liverpool
