= List of Liverpool Docks =

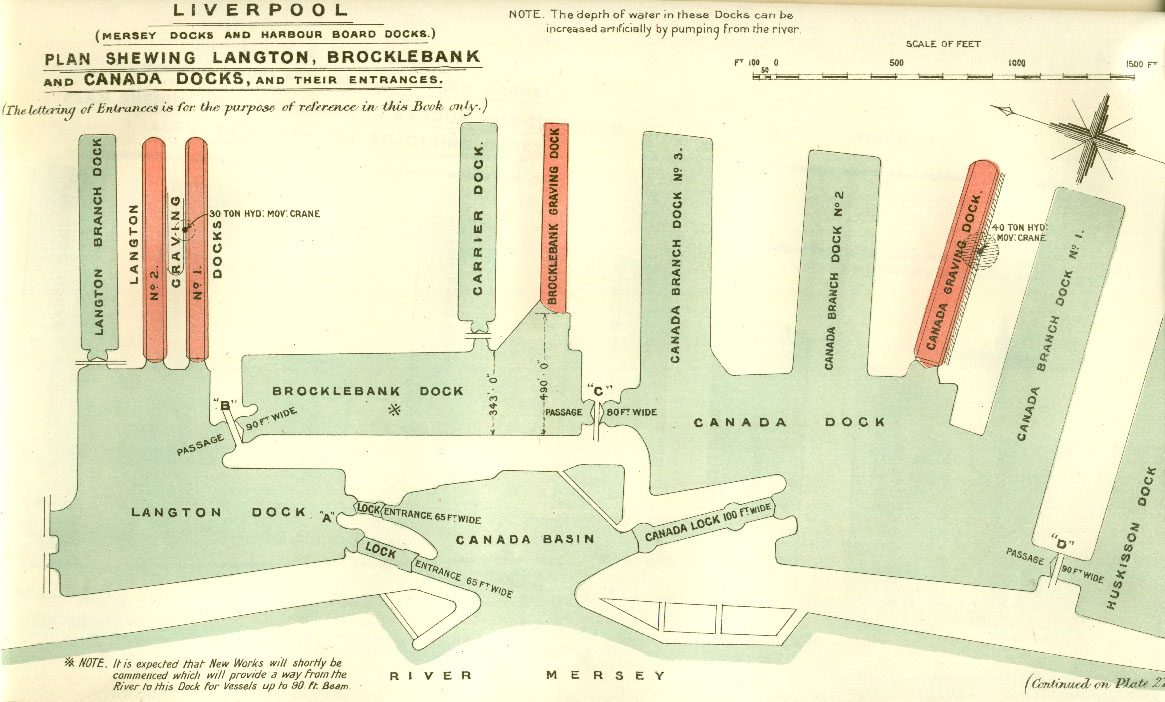
Old map Dkbkpl26: sequence N05—N09

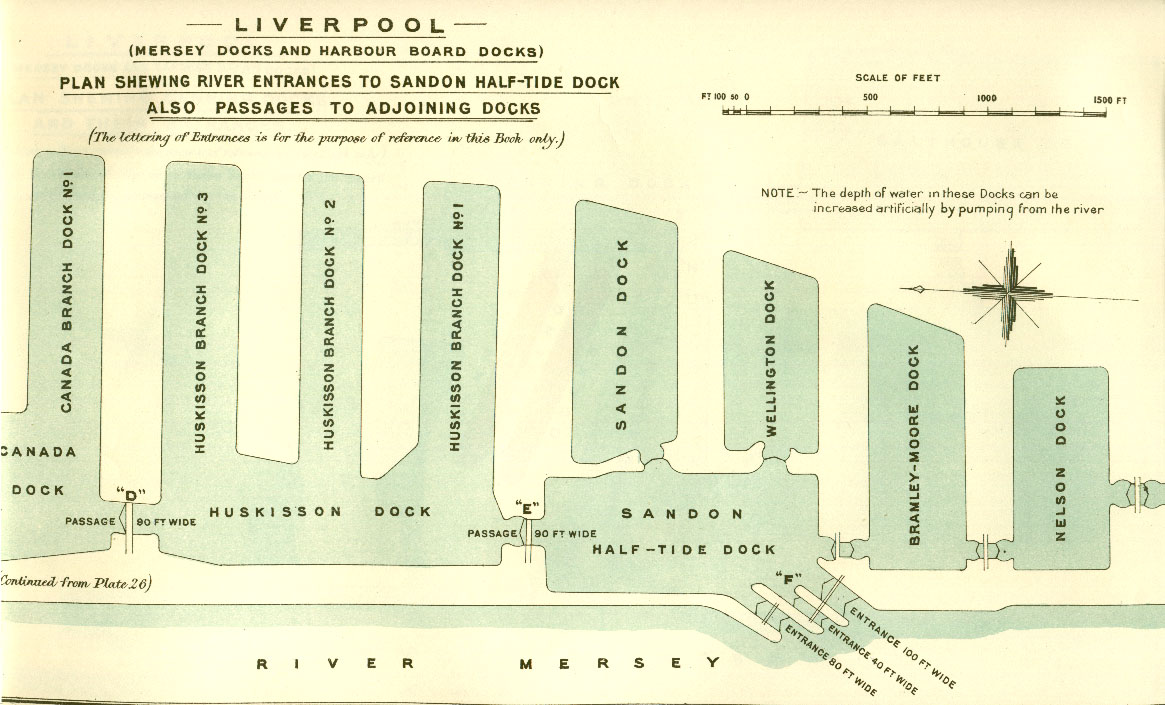
Old map Dkbkpl27: sequence N08—N14

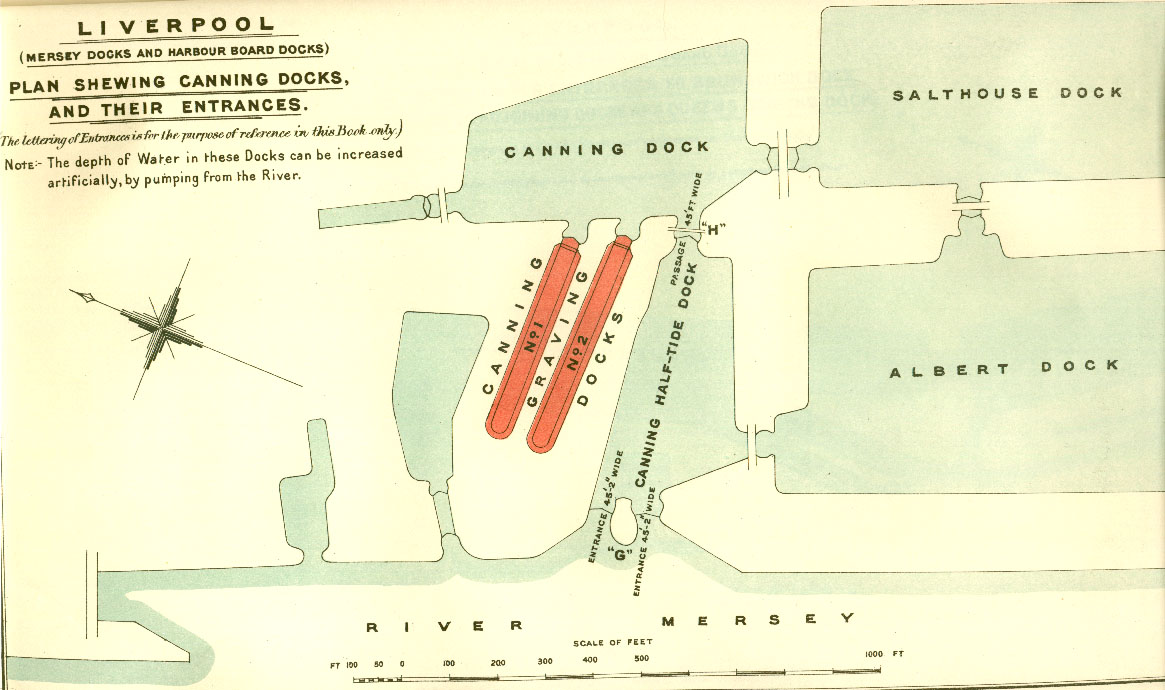
Old map Dkbkpl28: sequence S04—S07

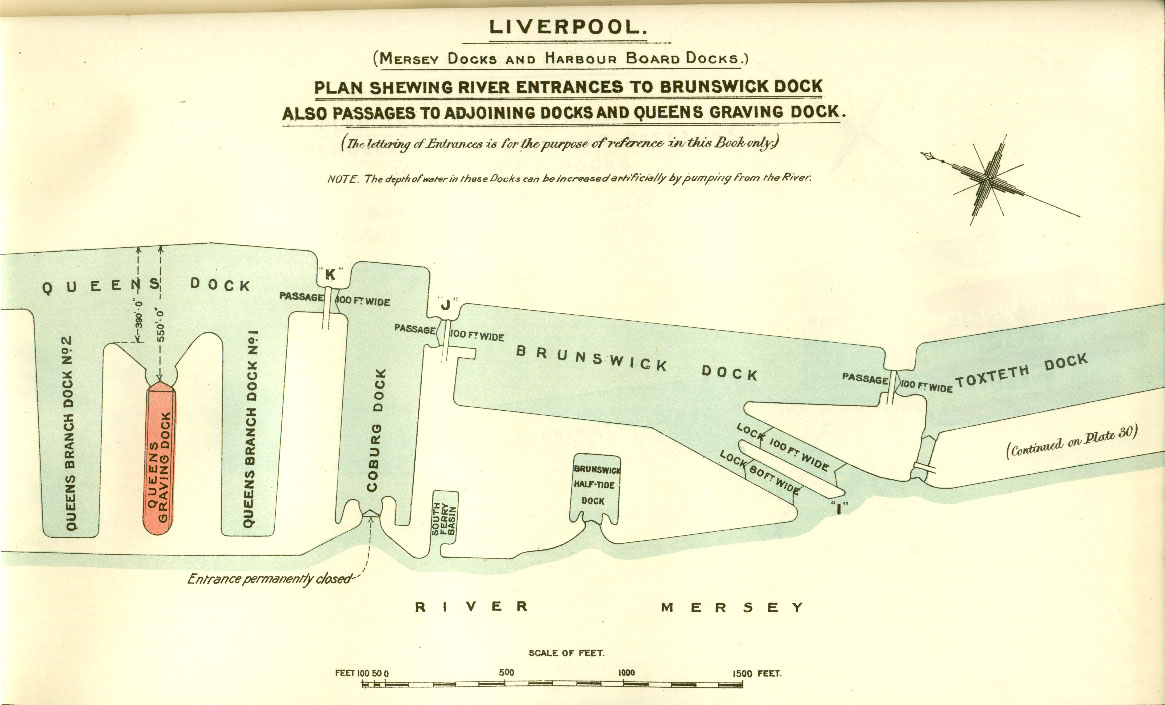
Old map Dkbkpl29: sequence S12—S17

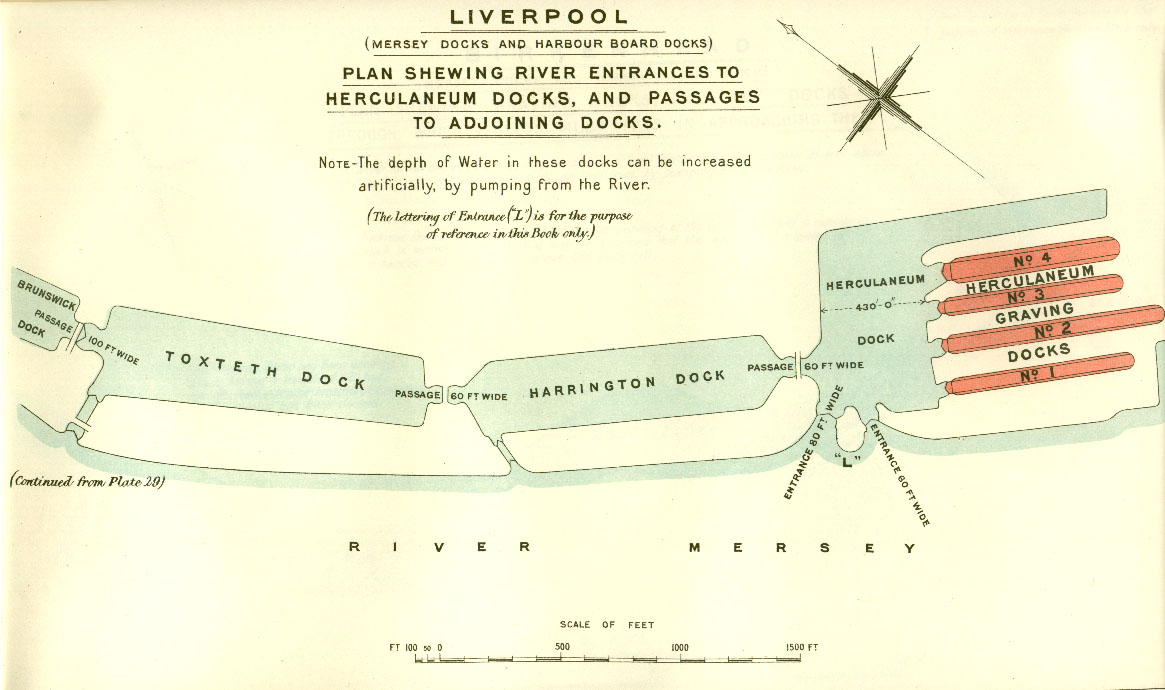
Old map Dkbkpl30: sequence S17—S19

Table of docks (past and present) in the Port of Liverpool, Liverpool, England.

The table can be sorted on each of its columns by clicking the small box in the header. The sequence runs from North (N01) to South (S19). (Using references: .)

Point	Coordinates (Links to map resources)	Sequence N→S	Notes
Seaforth Dock	53.4592°N 3.0250°W	N01	
Gladstone Dock	53.4549°N 3.0189°W	N02	
Hornby Dock	53.4518°N 3.0129°W	N03	filled-in
Alexandra Dock	53.4474°N 3.0120°W	N04	Google Map wrong
Langton Dock	53.4436°N 3.0092°W	N05	Google Map wrong
Brocklebank Dock	53.4412°N 3.0065°W	N06	
Carrier Dock	53.4403°N 3.0027°W	N07	filled-in; next to Brocklebank Dock
Canada Dock	53.4365°N 3.0050°W	N08	
Huskisson Dock	53.4316°N 3.0052°W	N09	
Sandon Dock	53.4283°N 3.0015°W	N10	filled-in
Sandon Half Tide Dock	53.4277°N 3.0050°W	N11	
Wellington Dock	53.4267°N 3.0016°W	N12	filled-in
Bramley-Moore Dock	53.4250°N 3.0030°W	N13	filled-in
Nelson Dock	53.4233°N 3.0032°W	N14	
Salisbury Dock	53.4215°N 3.0038°W	N15	
Collingwood Dock	53.4216°N 3.0016°W	N16	
Stanley Dock	53.4216°N 2.9985°W	N17	
Clarence Dock	53.4191°N 3.0019°W	N18	filled-in; next to Trafalgar Dock
Trafalgar Dock	53.4183°N 3.0039°W	N19	mostly filled-in
Victoria Dock	53.4155°N 3.0014°W	N20	filled-in
West Waterloo Dock	53.4140°N 3.0022°W	N21	reduced to inland canal boat depth
East Waterloo Dock	53.4142°N 3.0005°W	N22	
Prince's Half-Tide Dock	53.4122°N 3.0007°W	N23	reduced to inland canal boat depth
Prince's Dock	53.4091°N 2.9991°W	N24	reduced to inland canal boat depth
George's Basin	53.4063°N 2.9968°W	S01	filled-in; approx location
George's Dock	53.4050°N 2.9954°W	S02	
Manchester Dock	53.4031°N 2.9949°W	S03	filled-in
Canning Dock	53.4026°N 2.9918°W	S04	
Old Dock	53.4025°N 2.9886°W	S05	filled-in; approx location
Canning Half Tide Dock	53.4018°N 2.9937°W	S06	
Albert Dock	53.4003°N 2.9927°W	S07	
Salthouse Dock	53.4006°N 2.9898°W	S08	
Duke's Dock	53.3988°N 2.9907°W	S09	
King's Dock	53.3967°N 2.9900°W	S10	filled-in
Wapping Dock	53.3971°N 2.9874°W	S11	
Queen's Dock	53.3940°N 2.9854°W	S12	
Coburg Dock	53.3914°N 2.9851°W	S13	
South Ferry Basin	53.3902°N 2.9873°W	S14	
Brunswick Half Tide Dock	53.3887°N 2.9854°W	S15	
Brunswick Dock	53.3888°N 2.9833°W	S16	
Toxteth Dock	53.3839°N 2.9797°W	S17	filled-in
Harrington Dock	53.3808°N 2.9753°W	S18	filled-in
Herculaneum Dock	53.3786°N 2.9701°W	S19	filled-in
