= Atlantic Gateway (North West England) =

Proposed redevelopment strategy for North West England

Atlantic Gateway, sometimes referred to as Ocean Gateway, is a proposed redevelopment strategy for North West England, centering on the corridor between Greater Manchester and Merseyside. The proposal is for development backed by £50 billion of investment over 50 years, making it one of the most expensive and expansive development projects in UK history.

The project will involve extensive redevelopment of the Port of Liverpool and the Manchester Ship Canal and will be led by the Peel Group, the largest property investment company in the United Kingdom. Liverpool Waters and Wirral Waters, which together form the Mersey Waters Enterprise Zone, are also part of the project and Peel are also proposing renewable energy solutions which would give the region greater dependence on stable energy.

Liverpool and Manchester became rivals with the opening of the Manchester Ship Canal in 1894, which resulted in job losses at the Port of Liverpool, but the 2011 plan hopes to link the trade of the two cities to create, in the words of chairman of Peel, John Whittaker, "the most dynamic and economically sustainable region in the UK."

== Background ==
=== North West economy ===
It is hoped the plan will balance the north–south divide by transporting goods to the north of England by sea and canal rather than them having to travel from the south of England, often by road. It is envisaged that thousands of jobs would be created at the Port of Liverpool and along the Manchester Ship Canal. The Manchester Ship Canal runs alongside Trafford Park, Europe's largest industrial estate and home to many international companies such as Kelloggs and Adidas. In 2007, supermarket chain Tesco became the first modern retailer to transport its goods by canal. Its wine imports from South America, Australia and California are now brought through the Port of Liverpool and the Manchester Ship Canal to a storage facility at Irlam and then transported to a bottling plant less than a half a mile away. It is estimated that some 180,000 litres of wine a week are transported along the canal in this way taking 50 lorries off the road every week and, according to Tesco's own estimates, cutting carbon emissions by 80%. The ship canal is also used by Shell UK to transport 20% of its output of petrol and diesel and RHM plc ships more than 100,000 tonnes of wheat a year from the Royal Seaforth Grain Terminal at the Port of Liverpool to its mill in Trafford Park.

=== Road congestion ===
As of 2010, only 7 percent of the cargo-carrying potential of the Manchester Ship Canal is utilised, with the UK relying mostly on the transportation of goods now done by road haulage. Britain's roads are some of the most congested in Europe, with Manchester and Liverpool being the 4th and 8th most congested cities in the United Kingdom. Furthermore, Leeds and Sheffield, two cities which would be in proximity to the Port Salford freight terminal, also make the top ten of most congested cities in the UK. Peel believes using the Port of Liverpool and the Manchester Ship Canal to ship goods into the heart of Northern England would solve some of these problems and be an economically viable option. They also believe that the rising cost of fuel and the fact that road haulage volumes have to remain flat until 2050 for the UK to hit is carbon emissions targets, makes the Ship Canal a worthwhile project. In recent years, companies such as Prince's, Tesco, Adidas and Shell have used the barge service on the Ship Canal to transport products further inland from Liverpool.

== Objectives ==
=== Renewable energy ===
The project spans over 50 miles along the Manchester Ship Canal and River Mersey between Liverpool and Manchester and includes plans to invest in renewable energy such as tidal energy, biomass energy and waste-to-energy options. Proposed renewable energy projects have, however, hit snags with concerns as to whether they are economically viable. Examples include a £3.5 billion project to create a tidal power station on the River Mersey which was hoped to power up to 500,000 homes, but which was shelved in 2011. Peel stated that construction would take 10 years and it would be decades before they would make a return on the investment. Other renewable projects have faced opposition from local residents who would be affected by the developments. In July 2010, Peel Energy proposed the Barton Renewable Energy Plant in Trafford which would be fuelled by biomass. There have been protests about the creation of the plant but Peel claim 80% of the public support the plans which they say would provide energy to 40,000 homes.

=== Opportunities ===
The Peel Group has estimated that there is potential for up to 250,000 new jobs along the gateway, with 140,000 resulting from immediate investment in logistics and retail.

== Individual projects ==
=== Manchester Docks: Port Salford ===
The Port Salford plan will create a freight terminal near Trafford Park. The Port Salford facility will include a 153,000-square-metre (1,650,000 sq ft) warehousing facility and up to 3000 new jobs could be created. It is envisaged that companies will choose to transport products and commodities via the waterborne route of the Manchester Ship Canal rather than by road or rail and reduce transportation costs for businesses in northern England. To maximise Port Salford's potential, the Western Gateway Enabling Scheme will improve access to the site and surrounding areas.

Peel plan to begin construction in summer 2011, having issued tender details in early 2011 with the site operational by 2014. The port will be modelled on Duisburg Port, the largest inland port in the world. Upon completion Port Salford will be the only inland distribution park in the UK accessible by a canal or river; it is estimated that Port Salford will require 18 freight trains a day to shift goods stored at the distribution terminal.

=== Liverpool Waters ===
Liverpool Waters is a large-scale £5.5bn development that has been proposed by Peel in Vauxhall, Liverpool. The development will make use of a series of presently derelict dock spaces at Central Docks, with much of the docks formerly a World Heritage Site in an area north of Liverpool's historic Pier Head. The development is planned to create at least 17,000 full-time jobs and 21,000,000 square feet (1,951,000 m^{2}) of new commercial and residential floor-space, including 23,000 apartments and four hotels. The tallest towers are proposed to be over 50 storeys high.

It is split into four sectors:

- Sector A: Bramley-Moore Dock, Nelson Dock
- Sector B: Salisbury Dock, Collingwood Dock
- Sector C: Liverpool Canal Link, including Trafalgar Dock, Clarence Dock, West Waterloo Dock, East Waterloo Dock
- Sector D: Prince's Half-Tide Dock, Prince's Dock

The developers have stated that the project may take 50 years before it is finished. The proposals are presently at the planning stage and are subject to public acceptance. The planning applications were submitted by the developers on 4 October 2010.

=== Wirral Waters ===
Wirral Waters is a large-scale £4.5bn development proposed by Peel for Birkenhead, on the Wirral Peninsula. It is the sister programme of the Liverpool Waters project. Since 2012 the two projects have enjoyed enterprise zone status, together forming the Mersey Waters Enterprise Zone.

The main aim of the Wirral Waters development is to create 5,000,000 square feet (465,000 m^{2}) of modern office space at the East Float and Vittoria Dock in order to regenerate a largely unused series of disused dock spaces. The proposals include a waterfront hotel, bars, restaurants, other leisure facilities and 15,000 apartments to be housed in a series of towers, three of which will be fifty storeys high. A dedicated development is also proposed for the site of the former Bidston Dock, close to the M53 motorway and the Kingsway road tunnel to Liverpool. This will encompass an additional 571,000 square feet (53,000 m^{2}) of retail and leisure facilities. The architectural practice Broadway Malyan have been employed by Peel, and are responsible for the overall design of the development. Broadway Malyan are also responsible for the design of the redevelopment of Mann Island, across the River Mersey in Liverpool. If achieved, the project will dramatically increase the amount of business space available in the wider conurbation, addressing an imbalance that has seen the area develop 5,000,000 square feet (465,000 m^{2}) less office space than other urban centres of a similar profile. The developers expect that the scheme will lead to the creation of over 27,000 permanent jobs.

== See also ==
- Thames Gateway – similar development in the south east but with emphasis on urban regeneration.
- High Speed 2 – rail development which would link Manchester and London with a high-speed rail system.
