= Victoria Tower, Liverpool =

Clock tower in Liverpool

Victoria Tower
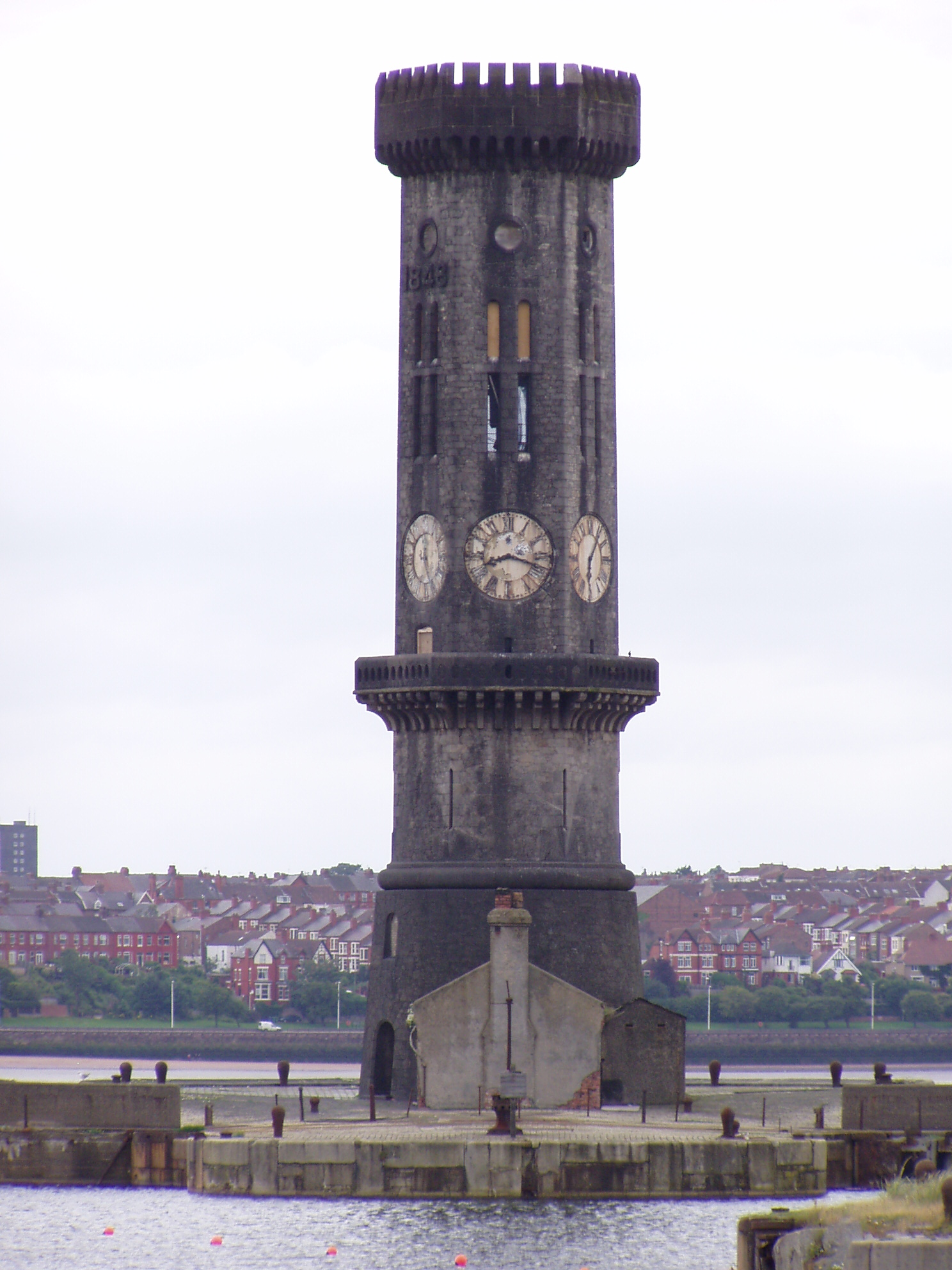

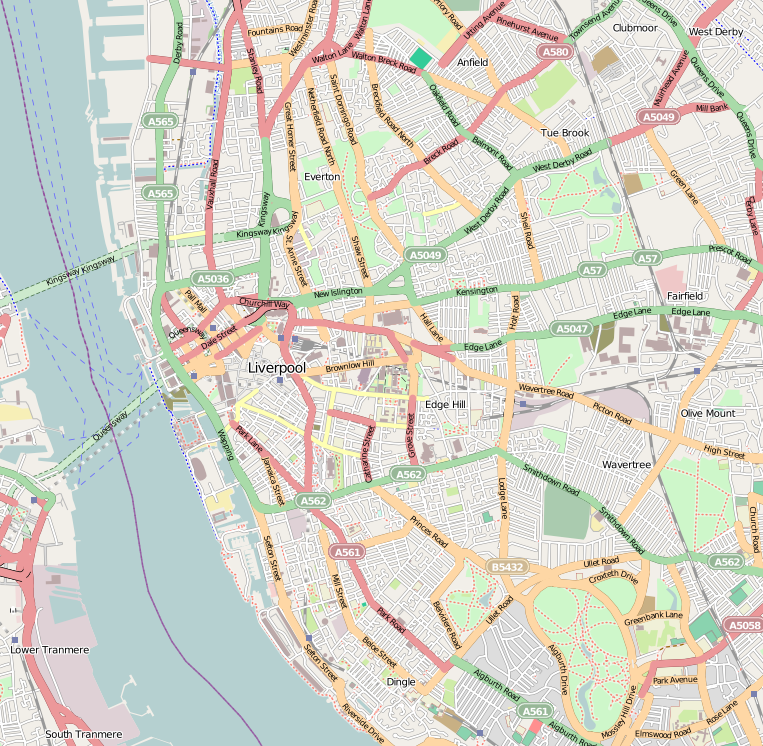
- Location within Liverpool

General information
- Type: Clock Tower
- Architectural style: Gothic Revival
- Location: Liverpool
- Coordinates: 53.42153°N 3.00495°W
- Construction started: 1847
- Completed: 1848

Design and construction
- Architect: Jesse Hartley (based upon an earlier design by Philip Hardwick)

Victoria Tower is a Grade II listed Gothic Revival clock tower located alongside Salisbury Dock in Liverpool, England. Positioned among the two river entrance gates to the Salisbury Dock itself, the tower acted as an aid to ships by providing both an accurate time and also warning of impending meteorological changes.

== Design ==
Victoria Tower was designed by Jesse Hartley and constructed between 1847 and 1848. It was completed in conjunction with the opening of Salisbury Dock. Its design was based upon an earlier drawing by Philip Hardwick in 1846. The tower's appearance is strongly influenced by the castle architecture of the Rhine region in Central Europe. There are embrasures in the tower's hexagonal column, arched alcoves are placed in the tapered circular base, and an overhanging 'castellated parapet' supported by corbels forms the roof. The structure is constructed from irregular shaped granite ashlar; a stone Hartley favoured in other projects. The tower can be roughly split into three portions:

== History ==
Victoria Tower was used as a navigation aid by shipping sailing in and out of the Port of Liverpool. It was also referred to as the 'docker's clock' because it had six clocks around its hexagonal column. These large timepieces allowed marine traffic to synchronise their ship chronometers as they sailed out into Liverpool Bay. The tower had a bell which was used to warn of impending changes to meteorological conditions such as tides, storms, and fog. There was also living quarters for the Port's Pier Master.

In 1975, the building was added to the Statutory List of Buildings of Special Architectural or Historic Interest with Grade II status.

== Preservation ==
Due to the demise of commercial shipping in Hartley's docks, Victoria Tower fell into a state of disrepair suffering significant decay due to water and wind damage. It became overgrown with vegetation and a leaking roof. In April 2010, it was announced that Victoria Tower, which is in the Stanley Dock Conservation Area, along with several other buildings around Clarence and Salisbury docks, would be repaired by Port owners, Peel Holdings. The tower and the areas around it are also included in the proposed £5.5bn regeneration programme, Liverpool Waters.
