= Liverpool Waters =

Proposed development in Liverpool, England

- Liverpool Waters logo

Project
- Developer: The Peel Group
- Website: Liverpool Waters

Physical features
- Major buildings: 21,000,000 square feet (1,951,000 m^{2}) of commercial / residential floor space

Location
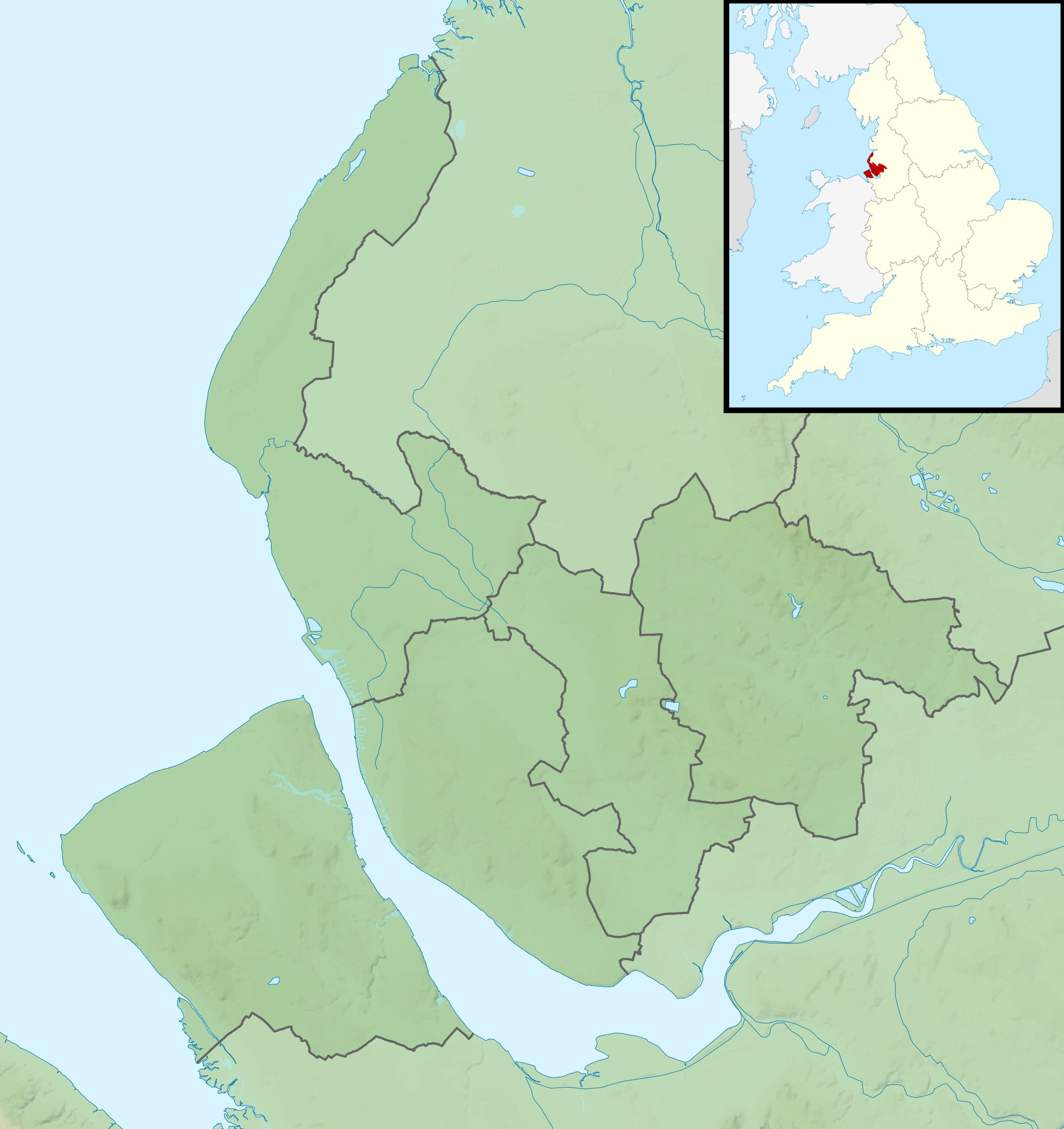
- Location within Merseyside
- Coordinates: 53.416°N 3.002°W
- Country: England
- City: Liverpool

Liverpool Waters is a large scale £5.5bn development that has been proposed by the Peel Group in the Vauxhall area of Liverpool, Merseyside, England. The development will make use of a series of derelict dock spaces at Central Docks. From 2004 to 2021, much of the docks involved in the development were part of the Liverpool Maritime Mercantile City, a UNESCO World Heritage Site, but the development of these docks were cited as a reason for the revocation of Liverpool's World Heritage status. This is an area north of Liverpool's historic Pier Head. It is the sister programme of the Wirral Waters project. Since 2012 the two projects have held enterprise zone statuses, together forming the Mersey Waters Enterprise Zone.

== The development ==
In 2007, Peel announced that they planned to create at least 17,000 full-time jobs and 21,000,000 square feet (1,951,000 m^{2}) of new commercial and residential floor space including 23,000 apartments and four hotels.

It is split into four sectors:

- Sector A: Bramley-Moore Dock, Nelson Dock
- Sector B: Salisbury Dock, Collingwood Dock
- Sector C: Liverpool Canal Link, including Trafalgar Dock, Clarence Dock, West Waterloo Dock, East Waterloo Dock
- Sector D: Prince's Half-Tide Dock, Prince's Dock

The developers have stated that the project may take 50 years before it is finished. The planning applications were submitted by the developers on 4 October 2010. and approved in 2013. English Heritage has formally objected to the plans and UNESCO has expressed concern, placing Liverpool - Maritime Mercantile City on its List of World Heritage in Danger in 2012. The proposal was referred to Communities Secretary Eric Pickles to assess whether to hold a public inquiry. Pickles' decision not to call a public inquiry, announced in March 2013, means that the project can go ahead regardless, although it is unclear what the next steps are or when they may be taken. In July 2021, the World Heritage Committee cited the development as a reason for the revocation of Liverpool's World Heritage status.

Soon after the 2024 general election, Chancellor Rachel Reeves announced the government would intervene on a number of 'stalled' development sites, including Central Docks, part of Liverpool Waters. It was then announced that Homes England were providing £55 million to pay for infrastructure works.

== Transport links ==
In 2007, a monorail to link the area to Liverpool's city centre, with the potential to connect to the John Lennon Airport was proposed. In 2024, a bus rapid transit system was proposed.

== Loss of Liverpool's World Heritage status ==
Liverpool's UNESCO World Heritage Site status was revoked in July 2021.. An earlier UNESCO report had recommended this revocation, with The Liverpool Waters project, the development at Bramley-Moore Dock and the longstanding development of the waterfront cited as reasons for this recommendation. This position was also reflected by English Heritage, who asserted that the proposals would leave the setting of some of Liverpool's most significant historic buildings "severely compromised", the archaeological remains of parts of the historic docks "at risk of destruction", and "the city's historic urban landscape ... permanently unbalanced".

== See also ==
- Atlantic Gateway
- Wirral Waters
