= Clarence Dock =

Clarence Dock may refer to:

- Clarence Dock (Leeds), Leeds, Historic Site and retail, tourist and leisure destination
- Clarence Dock (Liverpool), Liverpool, Historic Site
