= Bramley-Moore Dock =

Dock on River Mersey in Liverpool, England

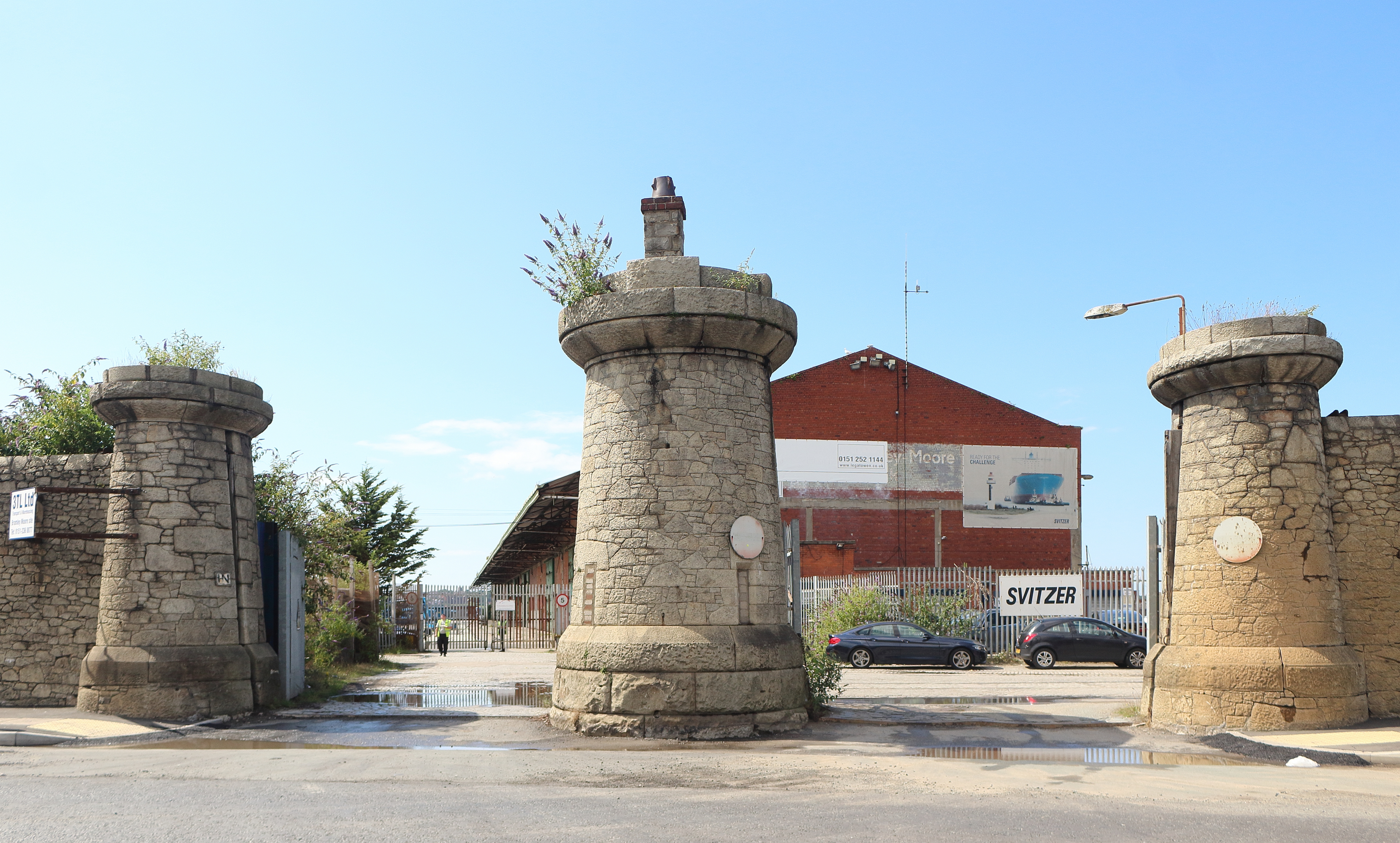
- Dock gates on the Dock Road

Location
- Location: Vauxhall, Liverpool, United Kingdom
- Coordinates: 53.4250°N 3.0030°W
- OS grid: SJ334924

Details
- Owner: Everton FC
- Operator: Mersey Docks and Harbour Company
- Opened: 4 August 1848
- Type: Wet dock
- Joins: Sandon Half Tide Dock; Nelson Dock
- Area: 9 acres (3.6 ha), 3,106 sq yd (2,597 m^{2})
- Width at entrance: 60 ft (18 m)
- Quay length: 935 yd (855 m)

Bramley-Moore Dock
- Location within Merseyside
- Owner: Everton FC

Bramley-Moore Dock was a dock on the River Mersey in Liverpool, England, and part of the Port of Liverpool. The dock is located in the northern dock system in Liverpool's Vauxhall area, and was connected to Sandon Half Tide Dock to the north and Nelson Dock to the south. Jesse Hartley was the architect. The dock opened in 1848.

The dock was infilled with reclaimed sand from the Mersey to create the foundation for Everton FC's new home ground, Hill Dickinson Stadium, which opened in 2025 and was constructed on the dock. The 52,888-capacity stadium opened in time for the start of the 2025–26 football season. The project was cited as one of the reasons for the revocation of Liverpool's World Heritage Site status as the Liverpool Maritime Mercantile City, with the World Heritage Committee stating that the project was one of the developments which had resulted in a "serious deterioration" of the historic site.

== History ==
The dock was opened on 4 August 1848, as part of Jesse Hartley's major northern expansion scheme of that year, and was named after and opened by John Bramley-Moore, chairman of the dock committee at the time. When built, Bramley-Moore Dock was the most northerly part of the dock system. At the time, access to the River Mersey was from the south, through the new Nelson and Salisbury Docks, which were all commissioned simultaneously. When built, Bramley-Moore Dock was used for the largest steamships of the era.

In 1851, further docks were opened to the north. These included Wellington Half Tide Dock, which gave a second access point for Bramley-Moore into the Mersey. The berthing of the larger ships was moved to the new Sandon Dock and Huskisson Dock within a few years of opening because of the ease of access to the river these docks offered. In around 1900, the Wellington Dock and the adjoining Sandon Dock were realigned, with the half tide dock separated as Sandon Half Tide Dock, as it remains today.

Although a mixed-use dock, with one of the original transit sheds still in place, Bramley-Moore did extensive coal trade. The coal handling included both coal for export and bunker coal for steamships in the port, transported from the South Lancashire Coalfield. A high-level railway opened in 1857 to transport coal directly to the north quay. The high-level railway was connected by viaduct to the adjacent Lancashire and Yorkshire Railway line. The high-level railway was operational from 1856 to 1966.

After the decline in coal-fired steamships, the dock continued to export coal. Following the demise of coal mining in South Lancashire, and most of the UK, the export market for coal dissolved with the dock ceasing coal exports in 1988.

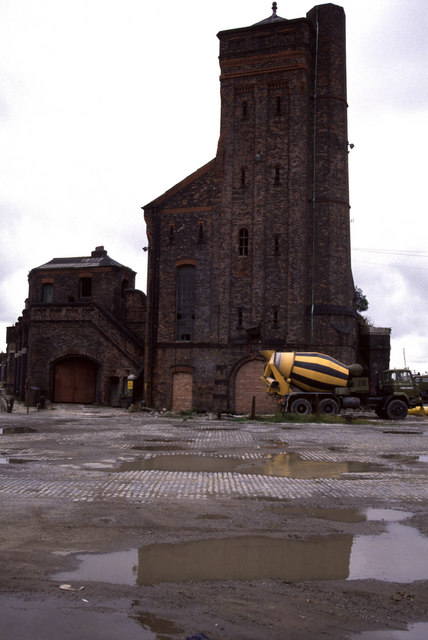
Disused hydraulic accumulator tower

Bramley-Moore Dock is the location of one of Liverpool's brick-built hydraulic accumulator towers. The Grade II listed tower is in severe disrepair with Everton's plans for a new stadium including the commitment to invest in heritage and repair and restore the tower for public use. The tower provided hydraulic power to dock gates and lifting equipment but is no longer active.

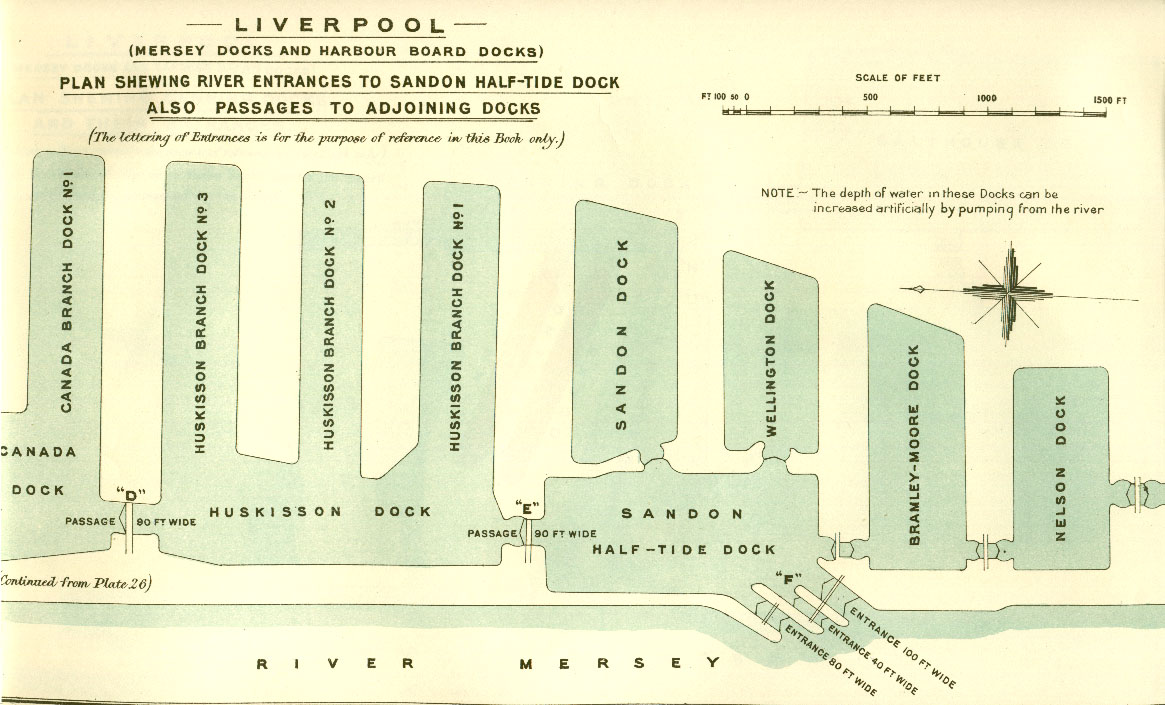
Bramley-Moore Dock within the Central dock cluster, 1909

=== 21st century ===
In 2007, the Peel Group, owners of the Mersey Docks and Harbour Company, unveiled the £5.5 billion Liverpool Waters regeneration programme. Bramley-Moore Dock is encompassed in the 150-acre (0.61 km^{2}) site.

Bramley-Moore Dock is the most northern of the docks within the former Liverpool Maritime Mercantile City World Heritage Site and the planned Liverpool Waters and the most southerly of the working docks. The hydraulic tower and dock retaining walls are Grade II listed buildings. Bramley-Moore Dock may have been listed as World Heritage Site but sits behind locked gates, semi-derelict with no access to the public, its heritage assets are decaying and is next door to a waste water treatment plant.

=== Everton Stadium ===
In March 2017, an agreement was reached between Liverpool City Council, Everton F.C. and Peel Holdings to acquire the dock for a new football stadium. A planning application was submitted in December 2019, with approval granted by the city council in February 2021 for development of a 52,888 capacity stadium. Everton's plans were stated as delivering a £1.3bn boost to the economy, create more than 15,000 jobs, attract more than 1.4m visitors and act as a catalyst for £650m of accelerated regeneration. At the planning meeting Everton also committed to investing up to £55m to repair, preserve, restore and open up Bramley-Moore Dock's heritage assets.

In July 2021, Liverpool Waterfront's UNESCO World Heritage status was revoked. A report from the World Heritage Committee described the forthcoming Bramley-Moore Dock development, along with the Liverpool Waters project, as having caused an "irreversible loss of attributes".

Ground was broken on the project in August 2021. A first test event was held in February 2025, and Everton are due to fully move into the stadium in time for the start of the 2025-26 football season.
