= J. B. Hartley =

British civil engineer (1814-1869)

John Bernard Hartley
- Born: 3 September 1814; Dungarvan, Waterford, Ireland
- Died: 14 December 1869 (aged 55)
- Education: Giggleswick school, Yorkshire
- Notable work: Hull Railway Dock; Victoria Dock; Birkenhead Docks
- Father: Jesse Hartley

John Bernard Hartley (3 September 1814 – 14 December 1869) was a British civil engineer, son of Jesse Hartley the Liverpool docks engineer. He was engineer on the Hull Railway Dock, and Victoria Dock, and other works, and was instrumental in promoting the Birkenhead Docks on the Mersey.

He retired in 1861 due to ill health and died in 1869.

== Biography ==
John Bernard Hartley was born on 3 September 1814 in Dungarvan, Waterford, son of Jesse Hartley, engineer of the Liverpool docks. He was brought up in Pontefract Yorkshire and educated at Giggleswick school, after which he began training under his father on the Liverpool dock estate. In 1835 he was placed under James Walker.

In 1840 he began working independently, and in 1842 was appointed engineer of the Hull Dock Company. There he was engineer during the construction of the Railway Dock and Victoria Dock. He left the employment of the dock company in 1858.

He also worked on lighthouses on the River Lune, at its mouth near Morecambe Bay, on the Hull and Barnsley Railway, the Wakefield, Pontefract and Goole Railway, and on docks at Purton Pill and Silloth Bay, a graving dock at Grimsby, a scheme for docks at Cardiff, and on the drainage of Portmadoc. In association with his father, he also worked on the docks at Liverpool and Birkenhead.

He was involved in prolonged attempts to obtain a bill enabling the construction of deep water docks at Birkenhead to the design of James Meadows Rendel, and later, in 1858, became engineer of the Birkenhead Docks.

His health failed in 1860, and he had left for the warmer climate of the Mediterranean when he received news of his father's death. He was appointed to his father's position on the Liverpool Docks estate, but retired owing to poor health, although he was retained as a consulting engineer. He subsequently lived at Letrualt House near Rhu, Dumbarton, while also travelling to spas in Switzerland. He died on 14 December 1869.

== Notable works ==
Castleford Bridge, Castleford, West Yorkshire (Built in 1808).

Business positions
Preceded by Jesse Hartley	Engineer to Mersey Docks and Harbour Board; 1860–1861	Succeeded by George Fosbery Lyster
