= Brunswick Half Tide Dock =

Coordinates: 53.3887°N 2.9854°W

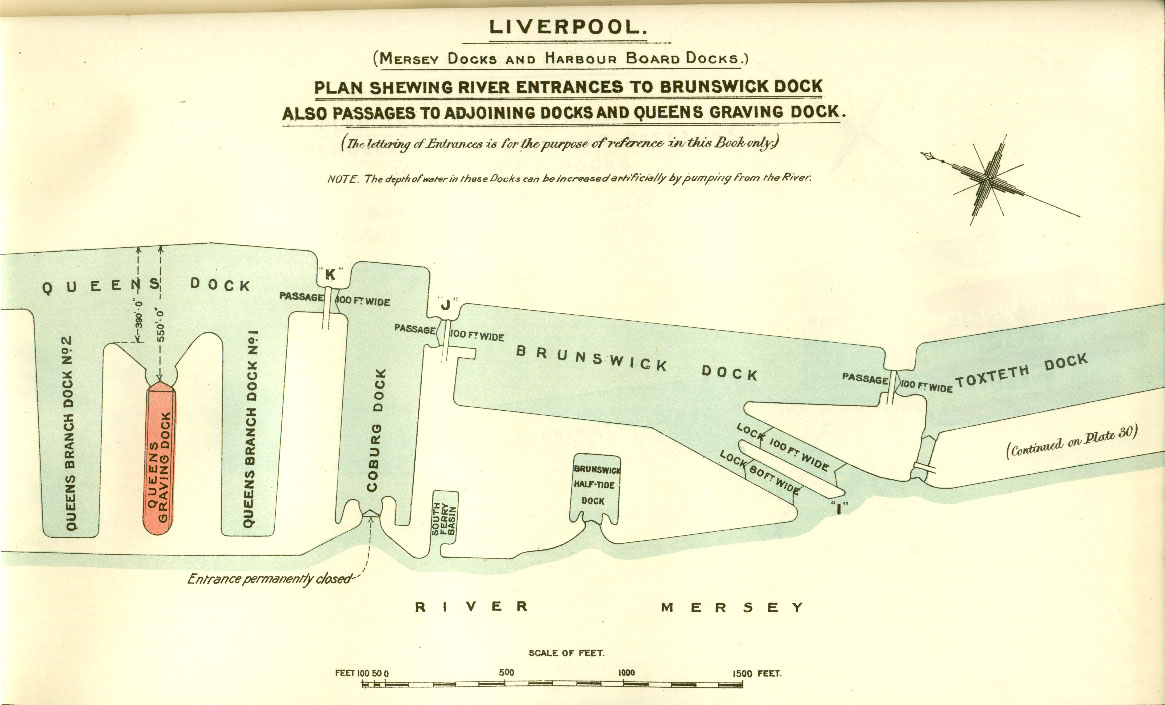
British Empire Dockyards and Ports, 1909, showing the position of the dock

Brunswick Half Tide Dock on the River Mersey, England, was a half tide dock and part of the Port of Liverpool. Situated near Brunswick Dock in the southern dock system, it only connected directly to the river.

The dock was built by Jesse Hartley, and opened around 1832. Apart from the entrance channel, the dock was filled in when the area was re-developed beginning in the 1980s.
