= Sandon Dock =

Former dock on the River Mersey, England

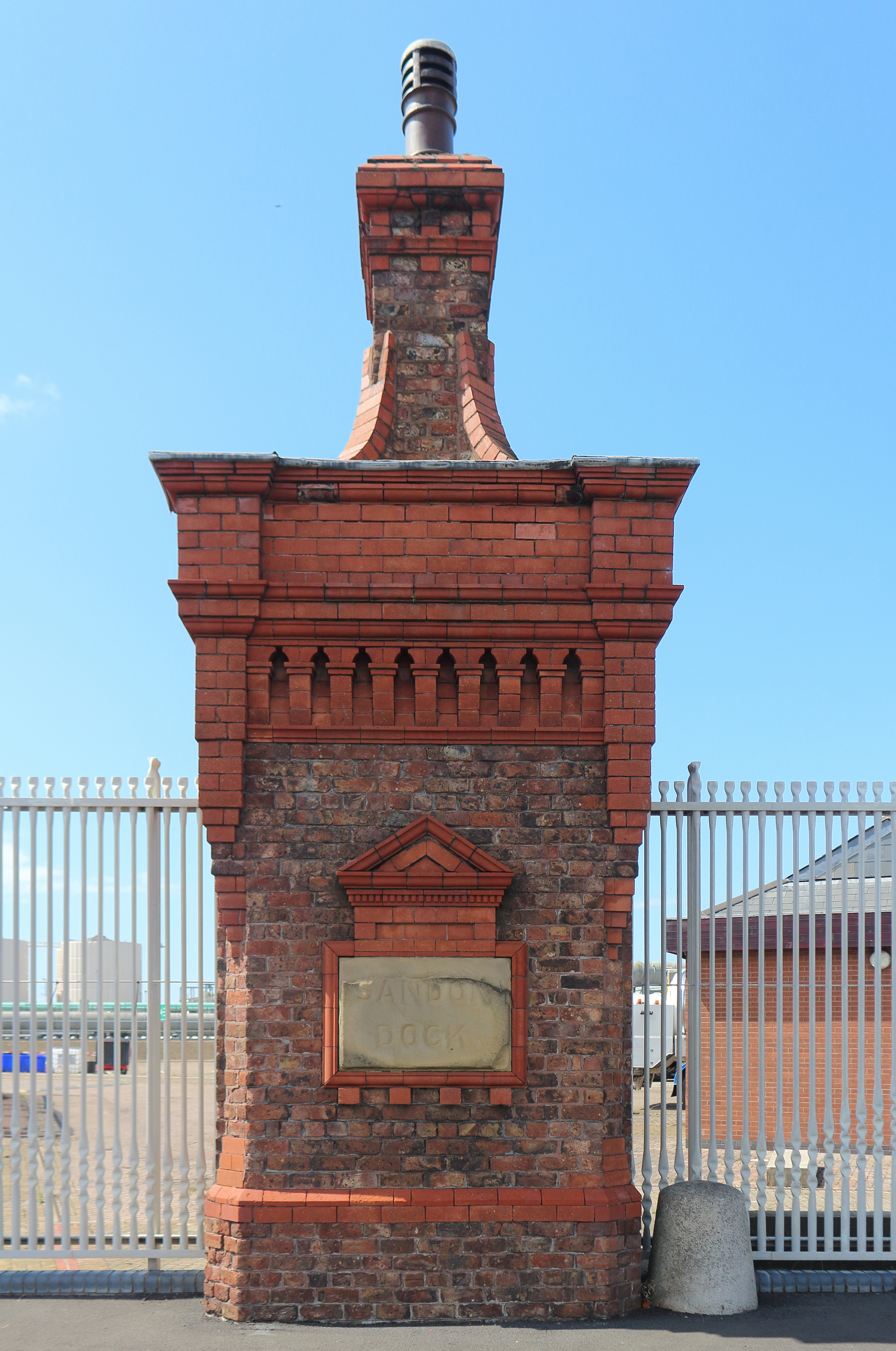
- Sign on gate pillar

Location
- Location: Vauxhall, Merseyside, United Kingdom
- Coordinates: 53.4283°N 3.0015°W
- OS grid: SJ334928

Details
- Opened: 1851
- Closed: Yes (closed and filled)
- Type: Wet dock
- Area: 10 acres (4.0 ha), 100 sq yd (84 m^{2})
- Width at entrance: 70 ft (21 m)
- Quay length: 867 yd (793 m)

Sandon Dock was a dock on the River Mersey, England, and part of the Port of Liverpool. Situated in the northern dock system, it was east of Sandon Half Tide Dock, to which it was once connected.

== History ==
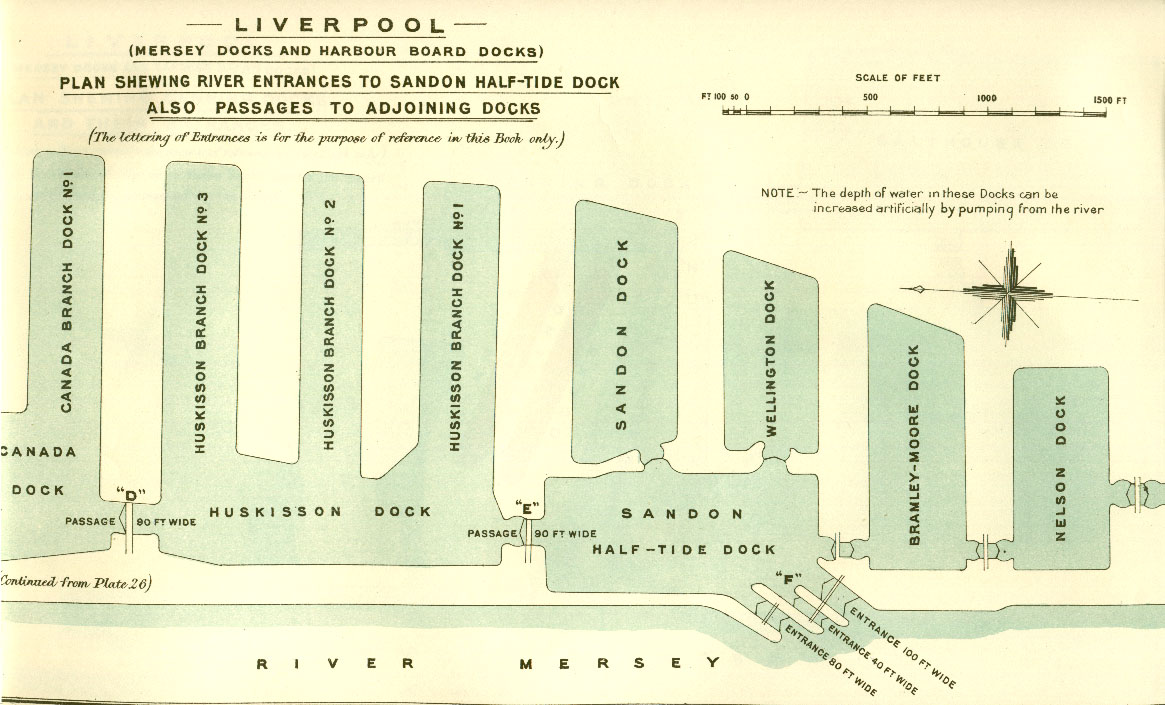
British Empire Dockyards and Ports, 1909

It was designed by Jesse Hartley and opened in 1851. Originally the dock basin was considerably larger and consisted of six graving docks to the north.

Sandon and Canada Dock Goods railway station was situated adjacent to the dock, and opened by the Midland Railway in 1873. The goods station could be accessed via the Huskisson Goods Tunnel, which was opened by the Cheshire Lines Committee in 1882 and closed in 1969. The goods station continued being used until 21 July 1969, and was later demolished. Sandon Dock railway station, between the dock and the goods station, was opened by the Liverpool Overhead Railway in 1893 and was closed before May 1896.

When Sandon Half Tide Dock was created at the turn of the 20th century, the remaining area was enclosed as Sandon Dock.

After trade decreased, the dock became derelict and was then converted to use as a fish farm. The dock was filled in 1989, with the site redeveloped as a sewage treatment plant and pumping station.
