= Jesse Hartley =

British civil engineer

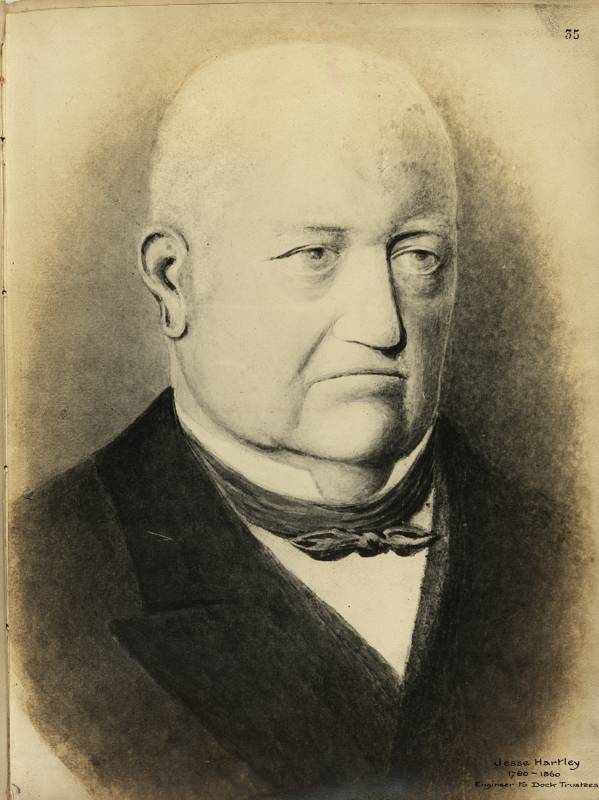
- Jesse Hartley
- Born: 21 December 1780
- Died: 24 August 1860 (aged 79)
- Occupation: Civil engineer
- Father: Bernard Hartley
- Relatives: John Hartley (son)

Jesse Hartley (21 December 1780 – 24 August 1860) was an English Civil Engineer and Superintendent of the Concerns of the Dock Estate in Liverpool, England between 1824 and 1860.

== Hartley's career ==
Despite having no experience building docks, Hartley was the first full-time professional dock engineer in the world. He had previously worked for his father Bernard Hartley, a stonemason, architect and bridgemaster John Carr, and the Duke of Devonshire.

Initially he was appointed deputy dock surveyor to John Foster Jr. However, due to Foster resigning three days later, Hartley was promoted to acting dock surveyor. During his service, he not only built new docks, but also modernised all of the existing docks with the exception of the Old Dock (opened in 1715), which had become disused and filled in. The docks at Liverpool grew from 46 to 212 acres (19 to 86 ha) during his tenure.

In 1831 he was appointed to convert the Manchester, Bolton and Bury Canal to a railway line. He persuaded the company to keep the canal open and build the railway more or less along its route.

Between 1841 and 1843 he prepared a number of different designs for fireproof construction of dockside warehouses. In 1843, he made models of warehouse arches at the Trentham Street Dockyard, to test sheet iron lined timber floored building method and brick and iron building materials. Through fire testing of these models, he eventually convinced the Dock Board Trustees of the benefits of his iron framed construction method. These experiments proved the worthiness of his fireproof design and he designed the Royal Albert Dock, Liverpool to these specifications.

Hartley's improvements over earlier dock and warehouse design included the use of locks to keep the water at a constant level, so that loading and unloading of ships’ cargoes was not reliant on the tide and the enclosure of the dock with high boundary walls, to reduce theft. He also adapted and improved the design of St Katherine's Dock in London, by incorporating high arches in the buildings to accommodate cranes.

In his younger days, Hartley is reputed to have worked for William Alexander Madocks at Port Madock (now Porthmadog) in Caernarfonshire, Wales. Examination of the piers of the Britannia Bridge there, across the River/Afon Glaslyn, shows cyclopean masonry of the type used by Hartley in Liverpool. The bridge can be dated c.1810 (give or take a year), was probably built in the dry and the river diverted through it in 1811/1812. The parapets have been renewed; there is a main road and a tramway/railway running across the bridge. Evidence of the original tramway was found during renewal of the road surface about 2008. It is thought by some to be the oldest railway bridge in the world still in use, but it has not carried a tramway/railway for the whole of that time.

== Docks built ==
- Clarence Dock – opened 1830
- Brunswick Dock – opened 1832
- Waterloo Dock – opened 1834
- Victoria Dock – opened 1836
- Trafalgar Dock – opened 1836
- Canning Half-tide Dock – opened 1844
- Royal Albert Dock, Liverpool – opened 1845 (officially opened 1846 by the Prince Consort)
- Salisbury Dock – opened 1848
- Collingwood Dock – opened 1848
- Stanley Dock – opened 1848
- Nelson Dock – opened 1848
- Bramley-Moore Dock – opened 1848
- Wellington Dock – opened in 1851
- Wellington Half-tide Dock
- Sandon Dock – opened 1849
- Huskisson Dock – opened 1852
- Canada Dock – opened 1859

== Notable buildings ==
Hartley utilised an eclectic mix of styles and methods of construction in the various buildings associated with the docks. These ranged from the cyclopean to ordinary brick built methods and styles as diverse as Greek revival and severe Gothic.

- Albert Dock Warehouses
- Wapping Dock warehouse
- Stanley Dock warehouses
- Stanley and Wapping Docks’ accumulator towers
- Canada Dock accumulator tower (demolished)
- Wapping policeman's lodge
- Salthouse Dock Transit shed (rebuilt granite gable end survives)
- Canning Half-tide Dock watchmen's huts
- Victoria Tower
- Point Lynas Lighthouse
- Turton and Entwistle Reservoir
- Castleford Bridge, Castleford, West Yorkshire (designed in 1805).

== Personal life ==
Hartley had one son, J.B. Hartley (1814–1869).

Preceded by John Foster	Engineer to Mersey Docks and Harbour Board; 1824–1860	Succeeded by John Hartley
