= Victoria Dock, Liverpool =

Dock in Liverpool, Merseyside, England

Victoria Dock
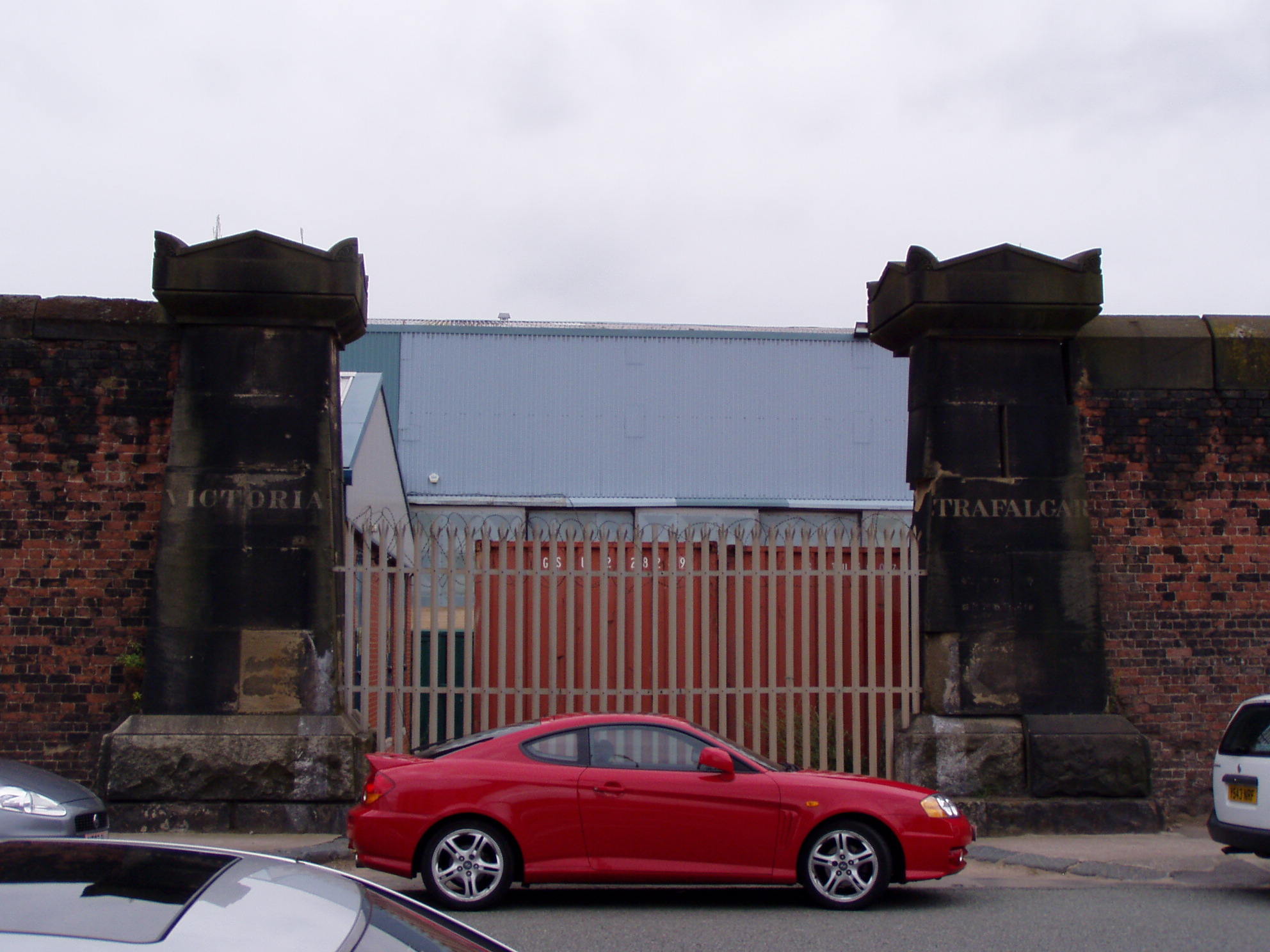
- Gateway to Victoria Dock

Location
- Location: Liverpool, United Kingdom
- Coordinates: 53.4155°N 3.0014°W
- OS grid: SJ334914

Details
- Opened: 1836
- Closed: 1988
- Type: Wet dock
- Area: 5 acres (2.0 ha), 3,559 sq yd (2,976 m^{2}) (in 1859)
- Width at entrance: 40 ft (12 m) (in 1859)
- Quay length: 755 yd (690 m) (in 1859)

Victoria Dock was a dock on the River Mersey, England, and part of the Port of Liverpool. Situated in the northern dock system, it was connected to Trafalgar Dock to the north and West Waterloo Dock to the south.

== History ==
The dock was designed by Jesse Hartley and opened in 1836, on the same day as Trafalgar Dock. The dock was named after Princess Victoria, the heir apparent to William IV, and was one of the last opened specifically for sailing ships. Victoria Dock originally had its own river entrance, which was closed in 1846.

Between 1844 and 1921, the Ordnance Datum for the British Isles was taken from the level of the Victoria Dock. The dock was altered in 1848. By 1858, the largest share of the dock's trade was with America. The dock was unmodernised until 1929.

In 1972 the body of the dock was filled in as part of the construction of a ferry terminal for the B&I Line. The remainder of the dock was closed in 1988.
