= Nelson Dock, Liverpool =

Dock on the River Mersey, England

Nelson Dock
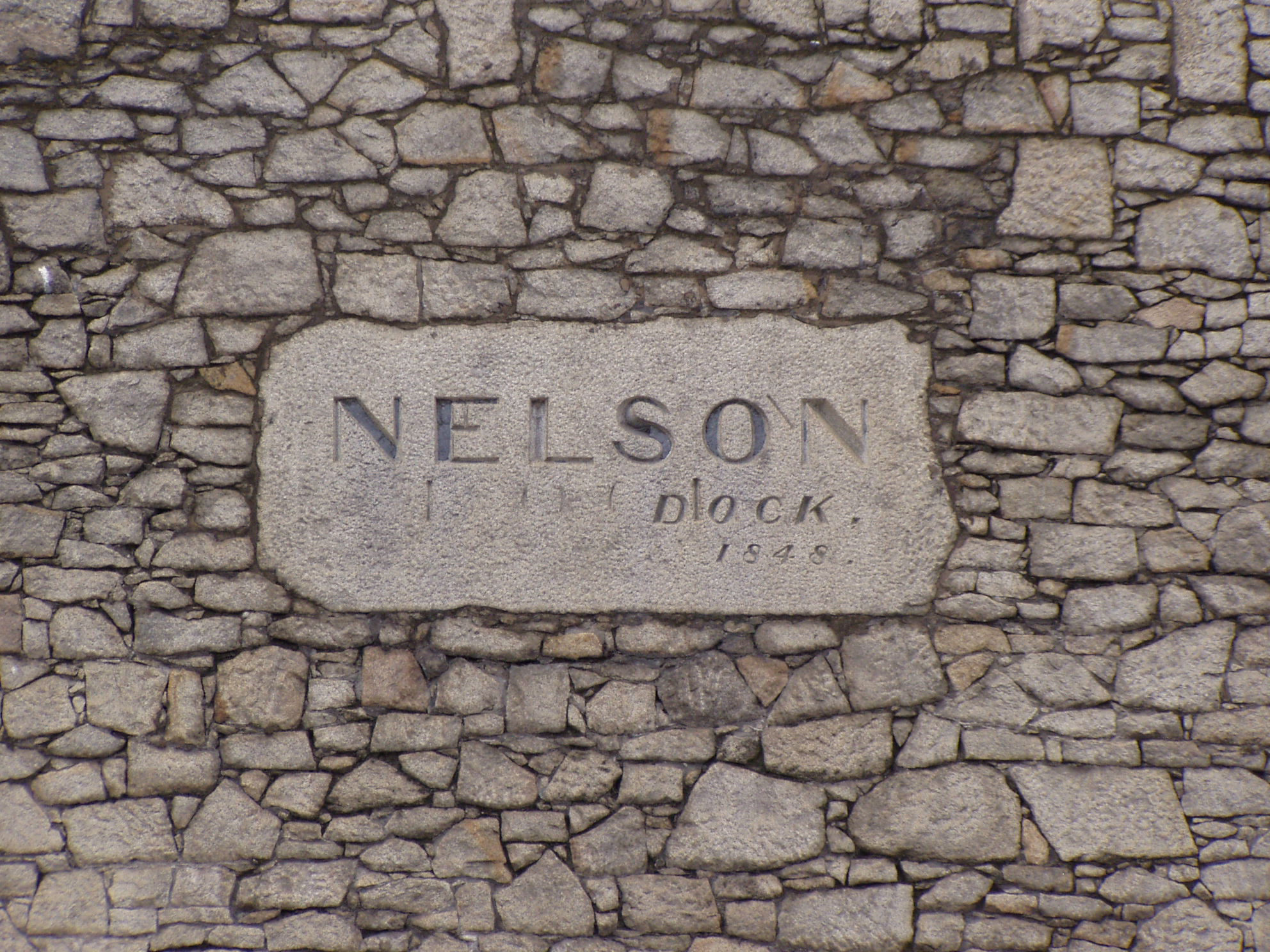

Location
- Location: Liverpool, Liverpool, United Kingdom
- Coordinates: 53.4233°N 3.0032°W
- OS grid: SJ334923

Details
- Owner: The Peel Group
- Operator: Mersey Docks and Harbour Company
- Opened: 1848
- Type: Wet dock
- Joins: Bramley-Moore Dock; Salisbury Dock
- Area: 7 acres (2.8 ha), 4,786 sq yd (4,002 m^{2})
- Width at entrance: 60 ft (18 m)
- Quay length: 803 yd (734 m)

Nelson Dock
- Location within Merseyside

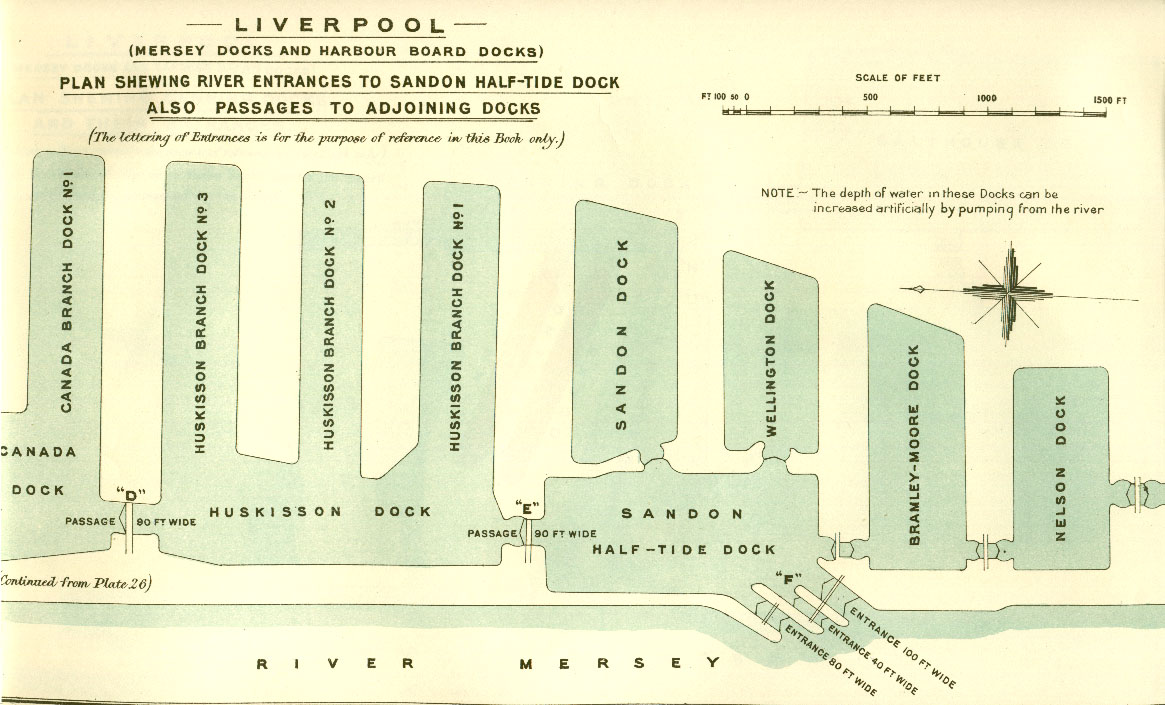
British Empire Dockyards and Ports, 1909

Nelson Dock is a dock on the River Mersey, England, and part of the Port of Liverpool. It is situated in the northern dock system in Vauxhall, connected to Bramley-Moore Dock to the north and Salisbury Dock to the south.

== History ==
The dock was designed by Jesse Hartley and opened in 1848.

In 2007, the Peel Group, owners of the Mersey Docks and Harbour Company, unveiled the £5.5 billion 'Liverpool Waters' regeneration programme. Nelson Dock is encompassed in the 150-acre (61 ha) site.
