= Salisbury Dock =

Dock on the River Mersey in Liverpool, England

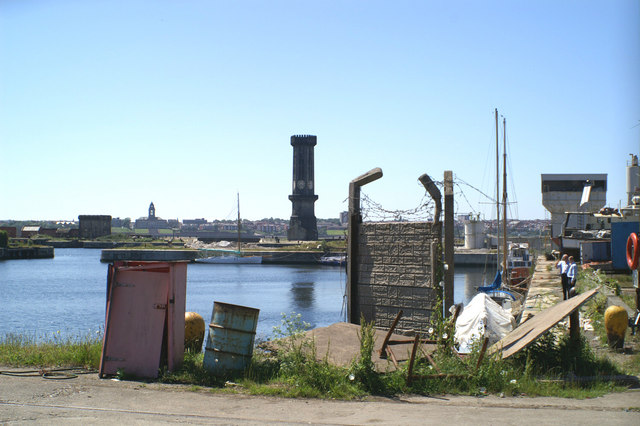
- Victoria Tower, from the landward side, looking across the dock

Location
- Location: Vauxhall, Liverpool, United Kingdom
- Coordinates: 53.4215°N 3.0038°W
- OS grid: SJ333921

Details
- Owner: The Peel Group
- Operator: Mersey Docks and Harbour Company
- Opened: 1848
- Type: Half tide dock (as built); Wet dock (current)
- Joins: Nelson Dock; Trafalgar Dock; Collingwood Dock
- Area: 3 acres (1.2 ha), 2,146 sq yd (1,794 m^{2})
- Width at entrance: 60 ft (18 m)
- Quay length: 460 yd (420 m)

Salisbury Dock is a dock on the River Mersey, England, and part of the Port of Liverpool. It is situated in the northern dock system in Vauxhall and is connected to Nelson Dock to the north, Trafalgar Dock to the south and inland to Collingwood Dock.

== History ==
Designed by Jesse Hartley, the dock opened in 1848. Its purpose was as a half tide dock, connected directly to the river via two lock entrances. These provided access between the Mersey and the Leeds and Liverpool Canal. By the mid twentieth century, the dock was the principal hub for coastal and barge traffic in Liverpool.

=== Victoria Tower ===
The hexagonal Victoria Tower, consisting of six clock faces, is located between the now disused lock entrances. The tower was based on an 1846 design by Philip Hardwick and built by Jesse Hartley in 1847-8 using irregular shaped granite blocks. The tower is inscribed with the date of its construction: '1848'. South of the former river entrance is the former Dock Master's Office, also built by Hartley in 1848 using masonry in the Cyclopean style. The tower's bell provided tidal and weather warnings to shipping. Although Grade II listed, the buildings are now disused and derelict.

== Regeneration ==
Salisbury Dock is part of the Stanley Dock Conservation Area and is on the route of the Leeds and Liverpool Canal extension to the Pier Head. In 2007, the Peel Group, owners of the Mersey Docks and Harbour Company, unveiled the £5.5 billion 'Liverpool Waters' regeneration programme. The project includes the restoration of Victoria Tower and the construction of two skyscrapers near the historic building.
