= Stanley Dock =

Dock on the River Mersey in Liverpool, England

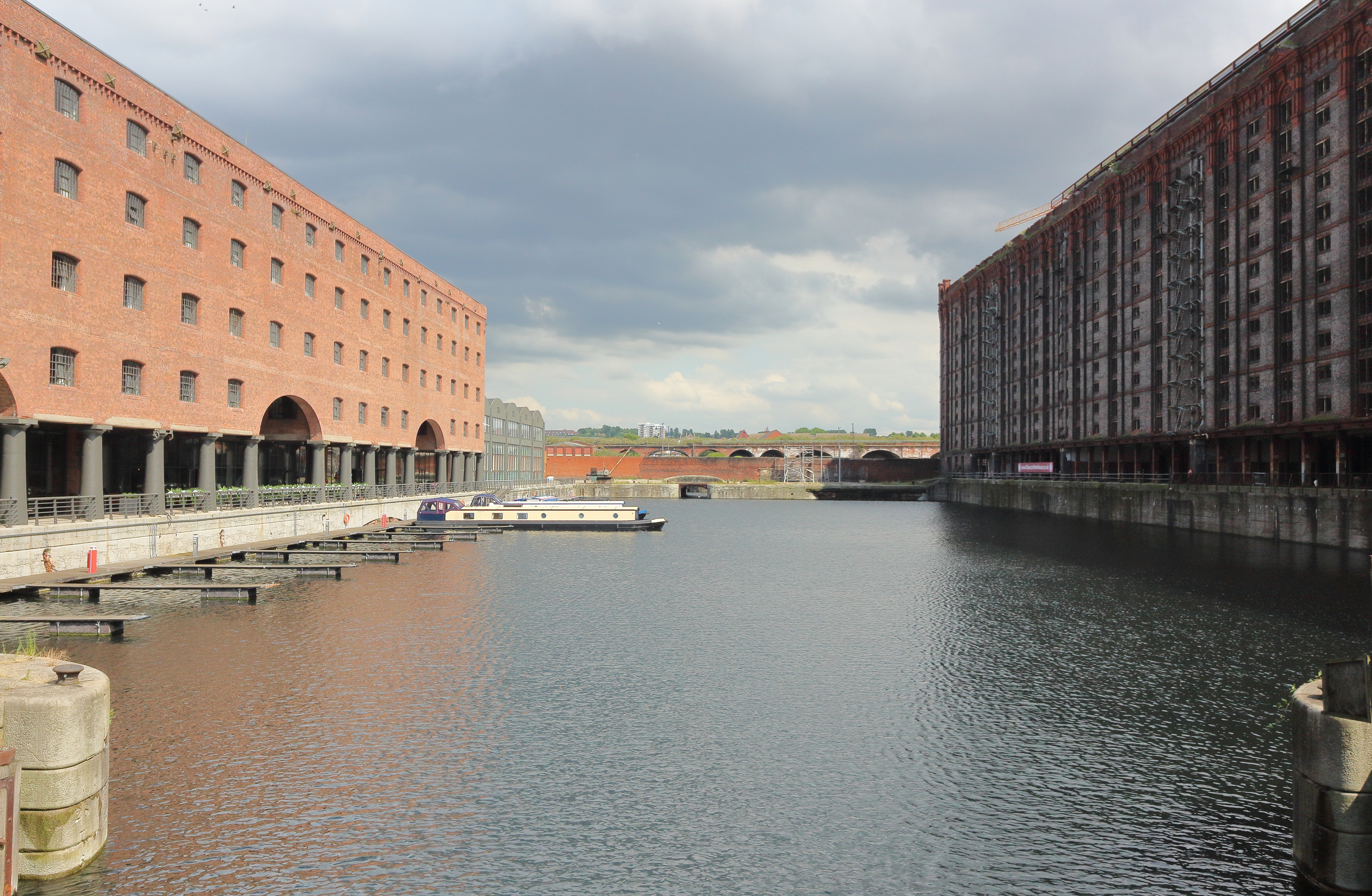
- Looking east over Stanley Dock towards the Leeds and Liverpool Canal

Location
- Location: Vauxhall, Liverpool, Merseyside, United Kingdom
- Coordinates: 53.4436°N 3.0092°W
- OS grid: SJ337921

Details
- Owner: Kitgrove Ltd.
- Opened: 1848
- Type: Wet dock
- Joins: Collingwood Dock; Leeds and Liverpool Canal
- Area: 7 acres (2.8 ha), 120 sq yd (100 m^{2})
- Width at entrance: 51 ft (16 m)
- Quay length: 753 yd (689 m)

Stanley Dock is a dock on the River Mersey, England, and part of the Port of Liverpool. It is situated in the Vauxhall area of Liverpool and is part of the northern dock system. The dock is connected to the Leeds and Liverpool Canal to the east and Collingwood Dock to the west.

== History ==
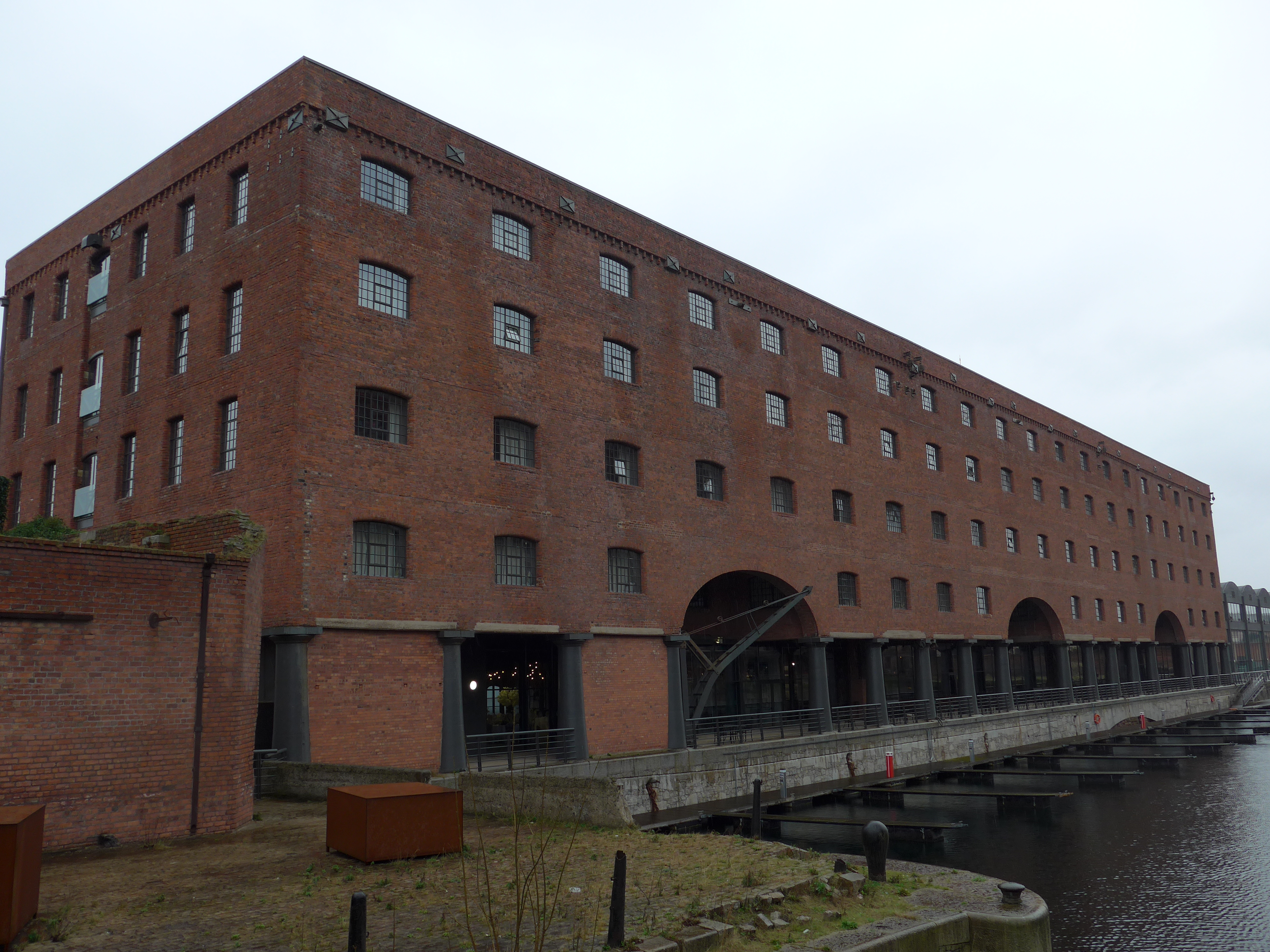
Titanic Hotel, North Warehouse and Rum Warehouse

Designed by Jesse Hartley, it opened on 4 August 1848. The dock is the only one in Liverpool which was built inland, all the others being built out from the foreshore. The original quay warehouses are of a similar design to those at Albert Dock and are grade II* listed buildings. The warehouses were built to five storeys, covering an area of 12,000 sq yd (10,000 m^{2}). Part of the northern quay warehouse was demolished after sustaining damage in an air raid during World War II. The southern quay warehouse remains, however no longer on a quay. Between 1897 and 1901, the southern part of the dock was filled in to build the large Stanley Dock Tobacco Warehouse by Anthony George Lyster. The tobacco warehouse stands between the new quay between and the older southern quay warehouse.

There are two entrances to the Stanley Dock complex at the south end from Regent Road and two at the north from Great Howard Street, via sets of three granite towers. These towers are similar in design to the towers in other Liverpool docks, and originally had sliding gates set into the thickness of the wall. There is also a link to the canal which opened in 1848, via the bridge under Great Howard Street, also designed by Hartley. The adjoining branch canal is 1,400 ft (430 m) in length and was built with a staircase of four locks, each 80 ft (24 m) apart, with a width of 16 1/2 ft (5.0 m). The staircase was built by J. B. Hartley.

== Regeneration ==
The dock is the focal point of the Stanley Dock Conservation Area. In 2006, work commenced on a £20 million extension of the Leeds and Liverpool Canal, providing a further 1.4 miles of navigable waterway towards the Pier Head. As of March 2007, plans have been unveiled for the warehouses to be redeveloped into office space and a total of 930 apartments. The plans involve digging out the centre of the tobacco warehouse to create a garden-filled courtyard.

The site featured as part of the Most Haunted Live! Liverpool investigation in January 2009 and in the 2011 superhero film Captain America: The First Avenger.

The remaining parts of the northern warehouse were in a "poor" condition, and on the Heritage at Risk Register 2011, but were approved for redevelopment. The northern warehouse has since been developed in to a hotel devoted to the White Star Line's RMS Titanic liner, which has strong links to the area's history of docks and shipping.

The complex was listed as one of the key areas of Liverpool City Council's Ten Streets regeneration project in 2017.
