= Collingwood Dock =

Dock on the River Mersey in Liverpool, England

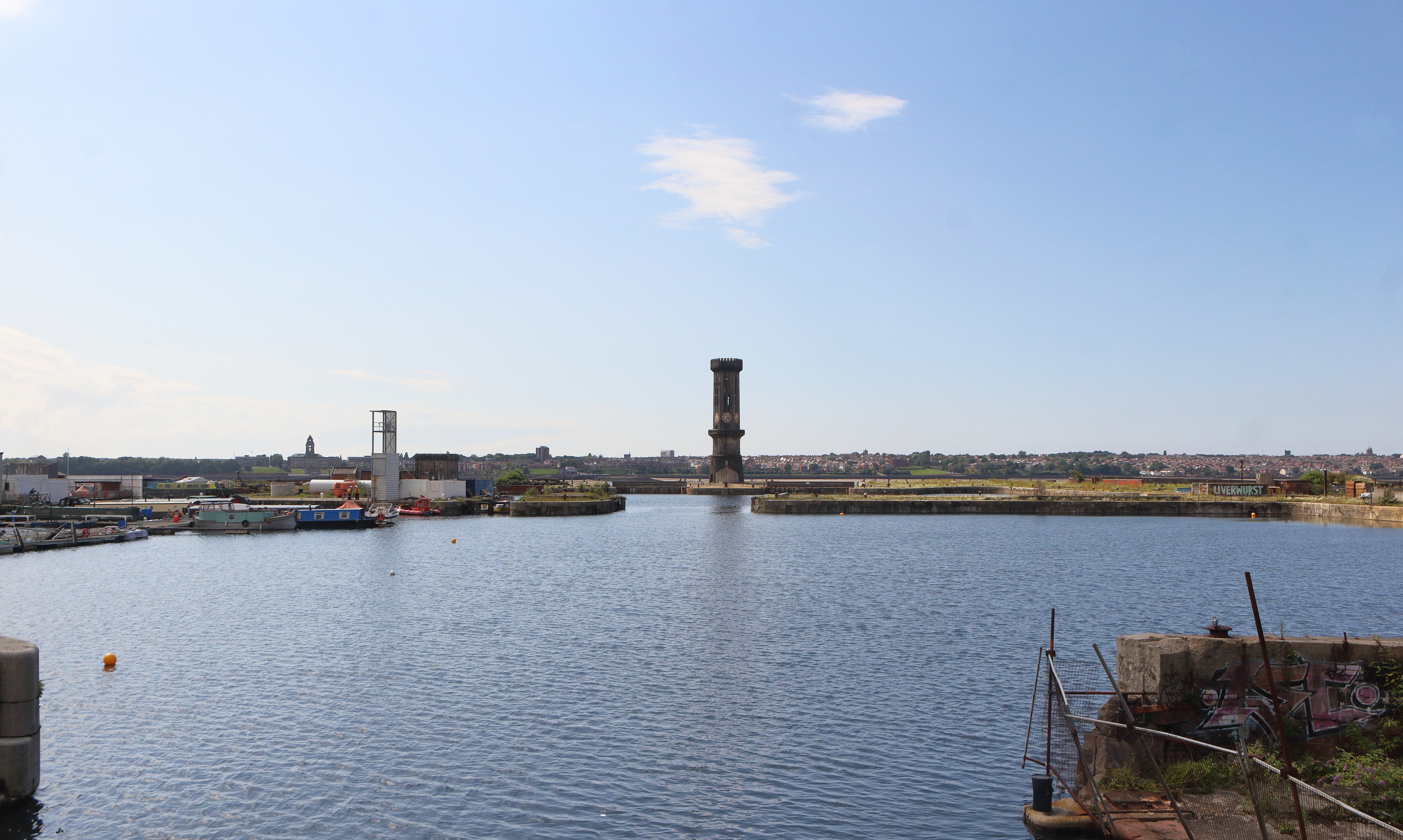
- Collingwood Dock

Location
- Location: Vauxhall, Liverpool, Merseyside, United Kingdom
- Coordinates: 53.4216°N 3.0016°W
- OS grid: SJ335921

Details
- Owner: The Peel Group
- Operator: Mersey Docks and Harbour Company
- Opened: 1848
- Type: Wet dock
- Joins: Stanley Dock; Salisbury Dock
- Area: 5 acres (2.0 ha), 244 sq yd (204 m^{2})
- Width at entrance: 60 ft (18 m)
- Quay length: 553 yd (506 m)

Collingwood Dock is a dock on the River Mersey, in England, and part of the Port of Liverpool. It is situated in the northern dock system in Vauxhall, and is connected to Stanley Dock to the east and Salisbury Dock to the west.

== History ==
The dock was designed by Jesse Hartley, and opened in 1848 along with four other Liverpool docks. The dock was named after Cuthbert Collingwood, 1st Baron Collingwood and was intended to handle relatively small vessels only. The Liverpool Corporation had a berth for its refuse boats in Collingwood Dock for many years. A bascule road bridge spans the passage between Collingwood and Stanley Docks.

== Present ==
Collingwood Dock has been little altered since construction. The dock is part of the Stanley Dock Conservation Area and is on the route of the Leeds and Liverpool Canal extension to the Pier Head.

Collingwood dock is home to the Glaciere Maritime Academy.
