= Trafalgar Dock =

Dock on the River Mersey in England

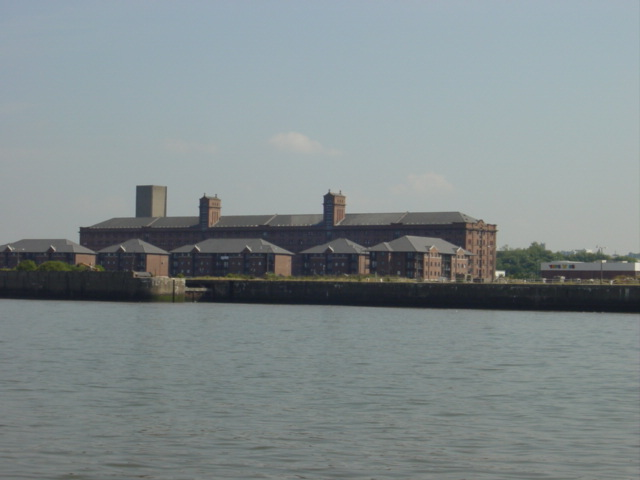
- Trafalgar Dock apartments seen from across the River Mersey

Location
- Location: Vauxhall, Liverpool, Merseyside, United Kingdom
- Coordinates: 53.4183°N 3.0039°W
- OS grid: SJ333919

Details
- Owner: The Peel Group
- Operator: Mersey Docks and Harbour Company
- Opened: 1836
- Type: Wet dock
- Joins: Salisbury Dock; Waterloo Dock
- Area: 5 acres (2.0 ha), 4,546 sq yd (3,801 m^{2}) (in 1859)
- Width at entrance: 45 ft (14 m) (in 1859)
- Quay length: 764 yd (699 m) (in 1859)

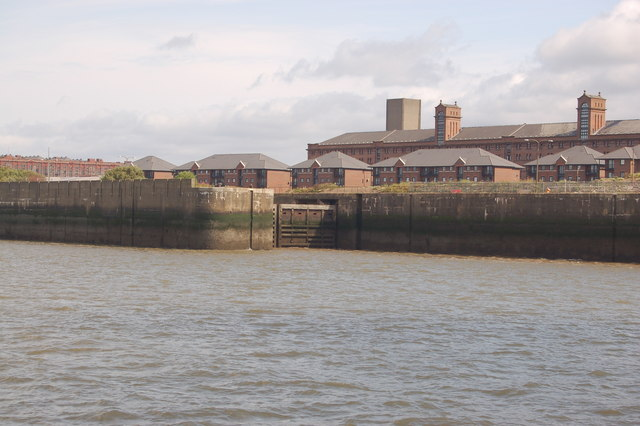
Former entrance to the old Trafalgar Dock from the Mersey.

Trafalgar Dock is a dock on the River Mersey, in England, and part of the Port of Liverpool. It is situated in the northern dock system in Vauxhall and connected to Salisbury Dock to the north. The sites of two former docks are located in the vicinity; Victoria Dock was located to the south and Clarence Dock to the east.

== History ==
Trafalgar Dock was designed by Jesse Hartley, opened in 1836 and named after the Battle of Trafalgar.

During the early 1990s, most of the dock basin was used as a designated landfill site. This has left only a section of the northern part of the dock and a narrow channel along the eastern dock wall. What remains of the dock provides access to Clarence Graving Docks.

In 2007, work began on a £20 million extension of the Leeds and Liverpool Canal, providing a further 1.4 mi (2.3 km) of navigable waterway. A new 6.5 m (21 ft)-wide channel was excavated through Trafalgar Dock to the northern end of West Waterloo Dock as part of the canal route.
