= Clarence Dock, Liverpool =

Dock on the River Mersey, England

Clarence Dock
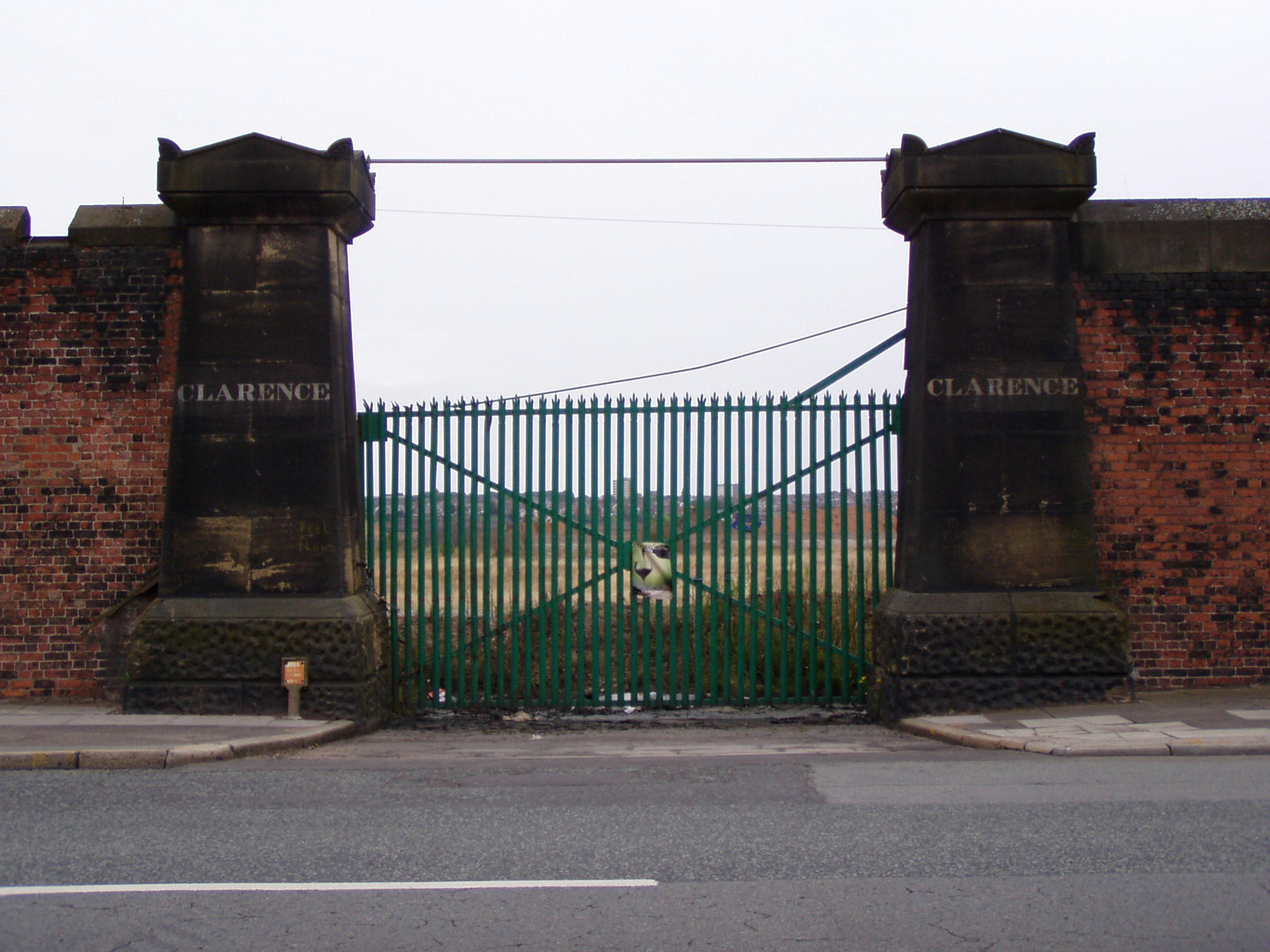
- Clarence Dock entrance

Location
- Location: Vauxhall, Liverpool, United Kingdom
- Coordinates: 53.4191°N 3.0019°W
- OS grid: SJ334918

Details
- Opened: 16 September 1830
- Closed: 1928
- Type: Wet dock
- Area: 6 acres (2.4 ha), 273 sq yd (228 m^{2})
- Width at entrance: 47 ft (14 m)
- Quay length: 914 yd (836 m)

Clarence Dock was a dock on the River Mersey, England, and part of the Port of Liverpool. Situated in the northern dock system in Vauxhall, it was connected to Trafalgar Dock.

== History ==
Designed by Jesse Hartley, the dock opened on 16 September 1830. Clarence Dock was named after William, Duke of Clarence, who became William IV.

It was built as a self-contained steamship dock facility. This was to avoid the risk of fire to wooden-hulled sailing vessels then using the other docks.

The dock was the principal berth for the Irish ferry ships. During the Irish famine in the 1840s over 1.3 million Irish people travelled through the dock. After many weeks or months, many took a ship to America from Waterloo Dock, there being fewer direct sailings to America from Ireland at this time. However many thousands made their home in Liverpool. Others moved to London and other British towns and cities in search of work.

The dock closed in 1928, and in 1929 was filled in when the site was redeveloped as power station.

=== Clarence Dock power station ===
Clarence Dock power station was constructed for Liverpool Corporation in 1931 to be an integral part of the local electricity grid system supplying electricity throughout Liverpool. The station plant comprised a low pressure station (No. 1) and a later high pressure station (No. 2) both based on coal-fired, water tube boilers and steam turbine driven alternators.

The plant in the low pressure station (installed 1931–32) comprised:

Boilers (all coal-fired)

- 4 × 160,000 pounds per hour (20.16 kg/s) of steam at 450 psi and 775 °F (31.0 bar and 413 °C)
- 4 × 200,000 lb/hr (25.20 kg/s) of steam at 450 psi and 775 °F (31.0 bar and 413 °C)

Turbo-alternators

- 2 × 51.25 MW twin cylinder Metropolitan-Vickers, 1,500 rpm, 7,250 kV, 3-phase, 50 Hz.

The plant in the high pressure station (installed 1937–53) comprised:

Boilers (all initially coal-fired, converted to oil-firing in the 1960s)

- 6 × 200,000 lb/hr (25.25 kg/s) of steam at 630 psi and 825 °F (43.45 bar and 441 °C)
- 1 × 250,000 lb/hr (31.5 kg/s) of steam at above conditions
- 5 × 350,000 lb/hr (44.1 kg/s) of steam at above conditions

Turbo-alternators

- 5 × 53.5 MW Metropolitan-Vickers, 1,500 rpm, 33 kV, 3-phase, 50 Hz.

The generating capacity, electricity output and thermal efficiency of the stations were as shown in the tables.

Clarence Dock No. 1 (LP) station
Year	Net capability, MW	Electricity supplied, GWh	Thermal efficiency, %
1954	97	332.131	20.39
1955	97	233.040	19.94
1956	97	193.322	19.46
1957	97	231.844	19.32
1958	97	185.421	19.03

Clarence Dock No. 2 (HP) station
Year	Net capability, MW	Electricity supplied, GWh	Thermal efficiency, %
1954	245	1203.070	24.25
1955	245	1317.984	24.93
1956	245	1361.523	24.68
1957	245	1257.017	23.90
1958	245	1130.607	23.05
1972	267.5	1101.661	23.60
1979	154	3.982	––

Clarence Dock station combined output
Year	Net capability, MW	Electricity supplied, GWh	Thermal efficiency, %
1946		1225.699	23.03
1961	370	843.204	22.12
1962	370	783.635	22.02
1963	370	952.591	22.09
1967	354	1052.1	23.42

By 1972 the No. 1 station had been decommissioned and the No. 2 station converted to oil firing. The No. 2 station was decommissioned in the early 1980s.

The three large chimneys of the Clarence Dock Power Station were a familiar local landmark, known as the Three Sisters, until the power station was demolished in 1994.

== Present ==
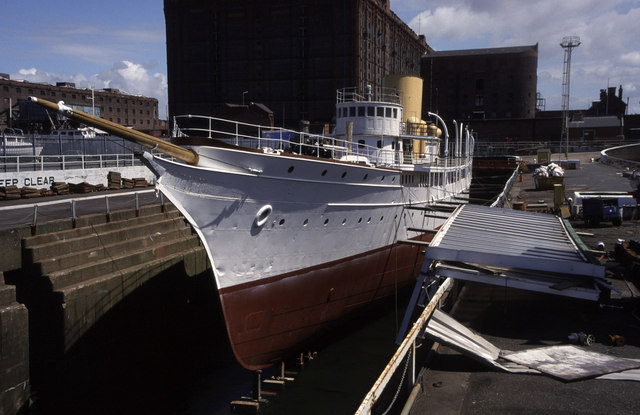
The yacht Nahlin in the graving dock, 2001. The Stanley Dock Tobacco Warehouse is behind

The two Clarence Graving Docks are still extant and accessible via what remains of Trafalgar Dock. On 17 July 2006, Irish vocal pop band Westlife held a concert for their Face to Face Tour supporting their album Face to Face.

As part of the Liverpool Waters development, Clarence Dock will become one of the clusters of tall buildings. It was one of the two clusters of tall high-rise buildings which have been agreed between Peel Holdings and English Heritage.

In 2004 it was proposed that a 60,000 seater stadium for Everton FC be built at Kings Dock by the Mersey Docks & Harbour Company and the NWDA. This would have included a rapid rail service to be financed by the NWDA. Nothing became of this. However, in 2016 Northern docks emerged as one of two possible new locations for a new ground for Everton.
