= Sandon Half Tide Dock =

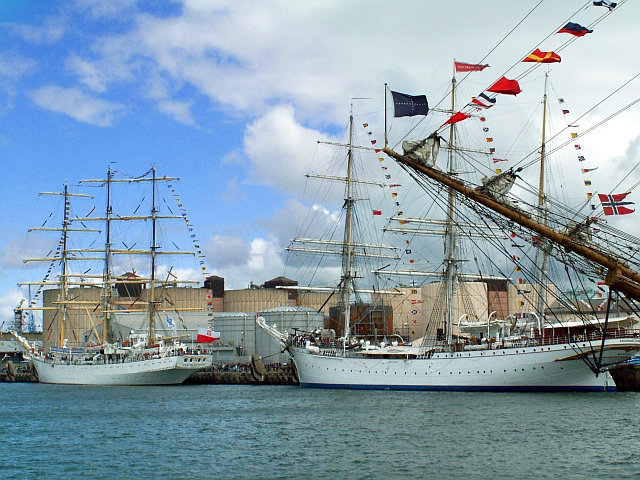
- Tall ships Dar Młodzieży (left) and Statsraad Lehmkuhl (right) in Sandon Half-Tide Dock during 2008

Location
- Location: Kirkdale, Liverpool, Merseyside, United Kingdom
- Coordinates: 53.4277°N 3.0050°W
- OS grid: SJ333927

Details
- Owner: The Peel Group
- Operator: Mersey Docks and Harbour Company
- Opened: 1851
- Type: Half tide dock
- Joins: Huskisson Dock; Wellington Dock; Bramley-Moore Dock

Sandon Half Tide Dock is a half tide dock on the River Mersey, England, and part of the Port of Liverpool. It is situated in the northern dock system in Kirkdale, connected to Huskisson Dock to the north, Wellington Dock to the east and Bramley-Moore Dock to the south. Sandon Dock was situated to the north of Wellington Dock and was accessible via Sandon Half Tide Dock.

== History ==
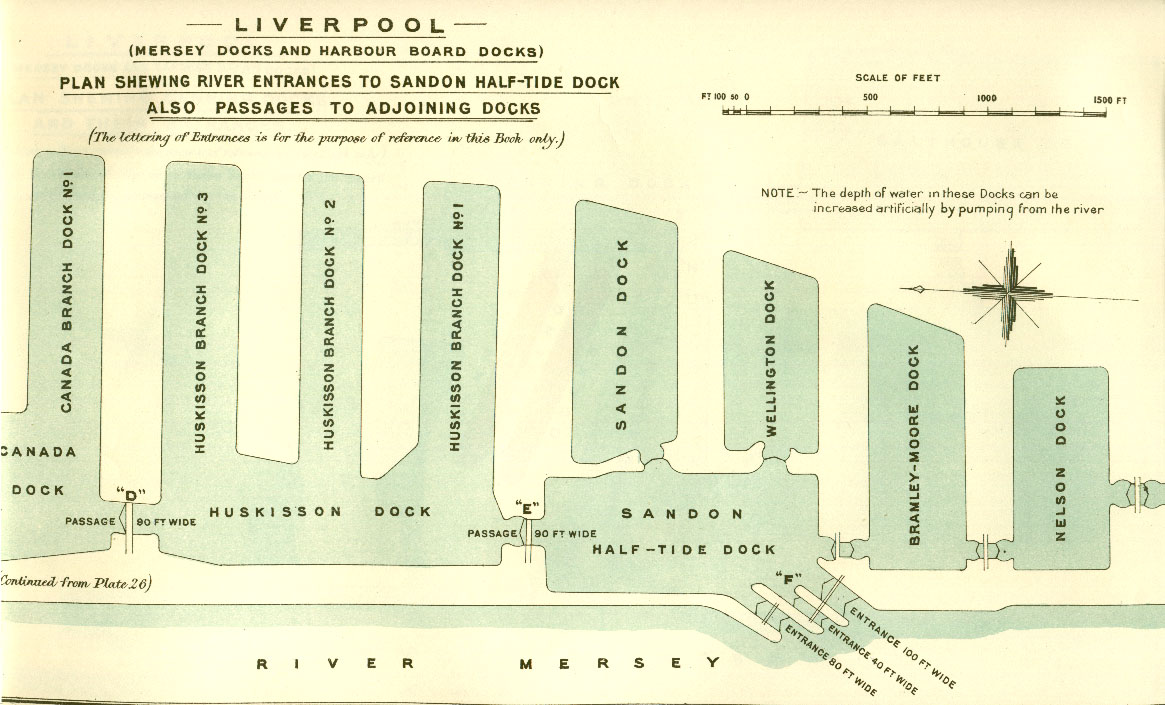
British Empire Dockyards and Ports, 1909

Opened in 1851, the site was originally part of both Sandon Dock and Wellington Half Tide Dock, which connected directly to the Mersey via a narrow lock entrance. At the turn of the 20th century, Sandon Dock was redeveloped and an enlarged half tide dock created, with two larger locks built either side of the original entrance. After these access channels were sealed in March 1977, the water quality in the dock was noted to have improved.

Between 18 and 21 July 2008, larger vessels participating in the 2008 Tall Ships' Race were berthed here and at neighbouring Wellington Dock.

== Present ==
The dock is the most southerly of Liverpool's docks within Liverpool Freeport.
