= North Docks Goods railway station =

Goods station in Liverpool

North Docks

General information
- Coordinates: 53.4235139°N 2.9988500°W

Other information
- Status: Disused

History
- Original company: Lancashire and Yorkshire Railway
- Pre-grouping: Lancashire and Yorkshire Railway
- Post-grouping: London, Midland and Scottish Railway

Key dates
- 26 March 1855: Opened
- 30 June 1963: Low-level depot closed
- 1 October 1966: High-level lines closed

North Docks good railway station was a goods station in Liverpool owned and operated by the Lancashire and Yorkshire Railway (L&YR), it was initially situated between Blackstone Street and Walter Street but gradually expanded beyond these boundaries.

The station was the terminus of the North Docks branch, which ran from a junction just north of Liverpool North Docks station (which later became Sandhills), both opened on 26 March 1855.

The station had connections onto the Mersey Docks and Harbour Board (MDHB) rail network. Associated with the station were two High-level coal branches in Bramley-Moore and Wellington docks, maintaining a higher level of line so that coal could be delivered directly into ships using shutes.

There were two goods sheds on the site, before 1864 one was constructed to the south, adjacent to and accessed from Great Howard Street, between 1864 and 1893 another, similar sized, shed was constructed adjacent to Blackstone Street.

By 1894 the station was reported to have a 20-ton crane.

The goods station dealt with a significant amount of imported Irish livestock, around 250 wagonloads a day for over 50 years until an outbreak of foot and mouth disease caused livestock to be diverted to Birkenhead and quarantined.

The goods station and yard closed on 30 June 1963 and the high-level coal lines closed on 1 October 1966.

== Bibliography ==
- Clinker, C. R. (October 1978). Clinker's Register of Closed Passenger Stations and Goods Depots in England, Scotland and Wales 1830–1977. Bristol: Avon-Anglia Publications & Services. ISBN 0-905466-19-5. OCLC 5726624.
- Marshall, John (1969). The Lancashire & Yorkshire Railway. Vol. 1. Newton Abbot: David & Charles. ISBN 978-0-7153-4352-4.
- Oliver, Henry; Airey, John (1894). Hand-book and Appendix of Stations, Junctions, Sidings, Collieries, &c., on the Railways in United Kingdom.
