= Wellington Dock =

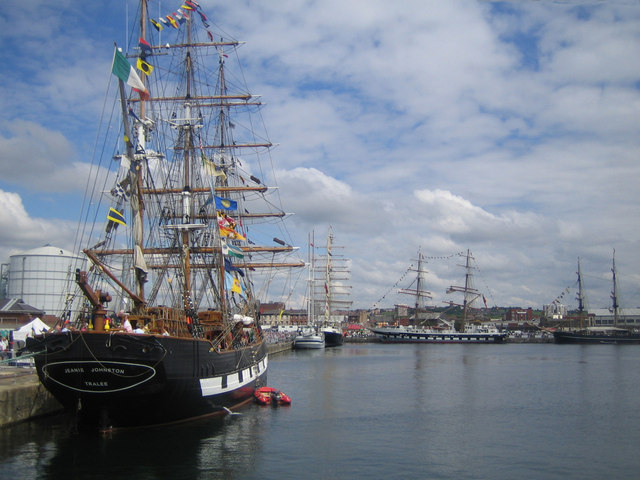
- The tall ship Jeanie Johnston in Wellington Dock during 2007

Location
- Location: Kirkdale, Liverpool, Merseyside, United Kingdom
- Coordinates: 53.4267°N 3.0016°W
- OS grid: SJ335926

Details
- Owner: The Peel Group
- Operator: Mersey Docks and Harbour Company
- Opened: 1851
- Type: Wet dock
- Joins: Sandon Half Tide Dock
- Area: 7 acres (2.8 ha), 4,120 sq yd (3,440 m^{2})
- Width at entrance: 70 ft (21 m)
- Quay length: 820 yd (750 m)

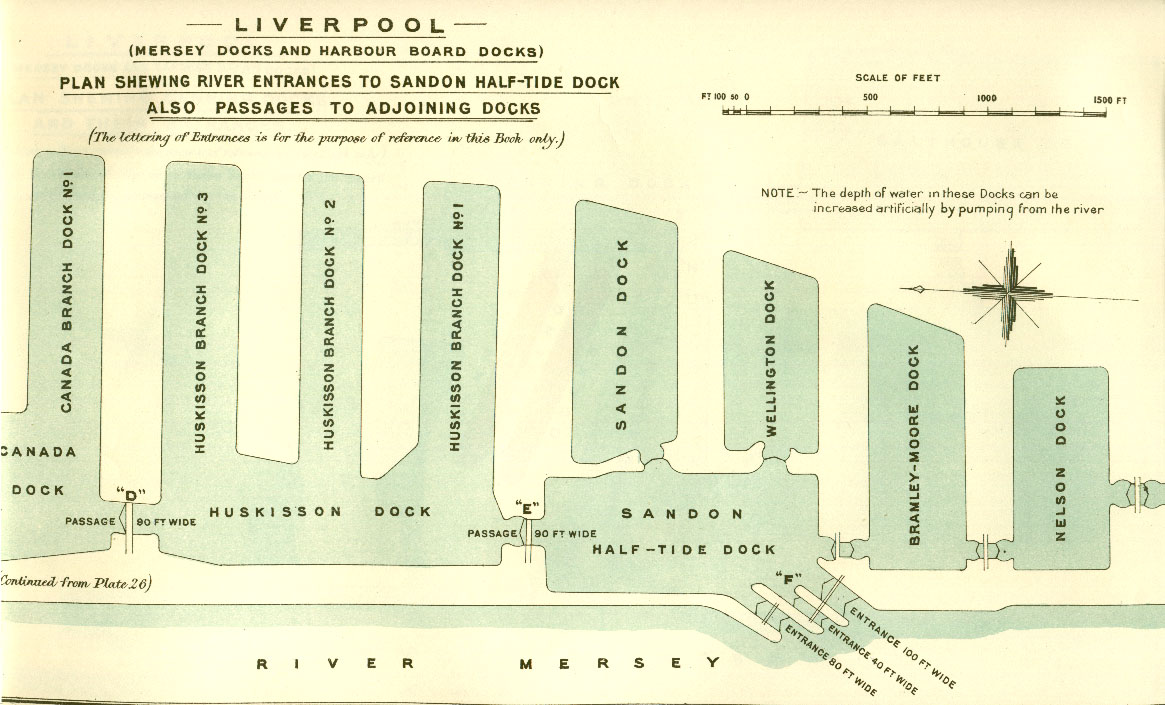
British Empire Dockyards and Ports, 1909

Wellington Dock was a dock on the River Mersey, England, and part of the Port of Liverpool. It was situated in the northern dock system in Kirkdale, connected to the Sandon Half Tide Dock to the west.

== History ==
The dock was designed by Jesse Hartley opening in 1851.

Between 18 and 21 July 2008, larger vessels participating in the 2008 Tall Ships' Race were berthed here and at neighbouring Sandon Half Tide Dock.

In January 2012, Liverpool City Council gave United Utilities permission to expand its sewage treatment plant from the adjacent site of the former Sandon Dock into the site of Wellington Dock. Architectural features would be retained where possible but the dock itself ceased to exist.
