= Port of Liverpool =

Series of docks on the River Mersey, Liverpool, England

Coordinates: 53.406°N 2.996°W

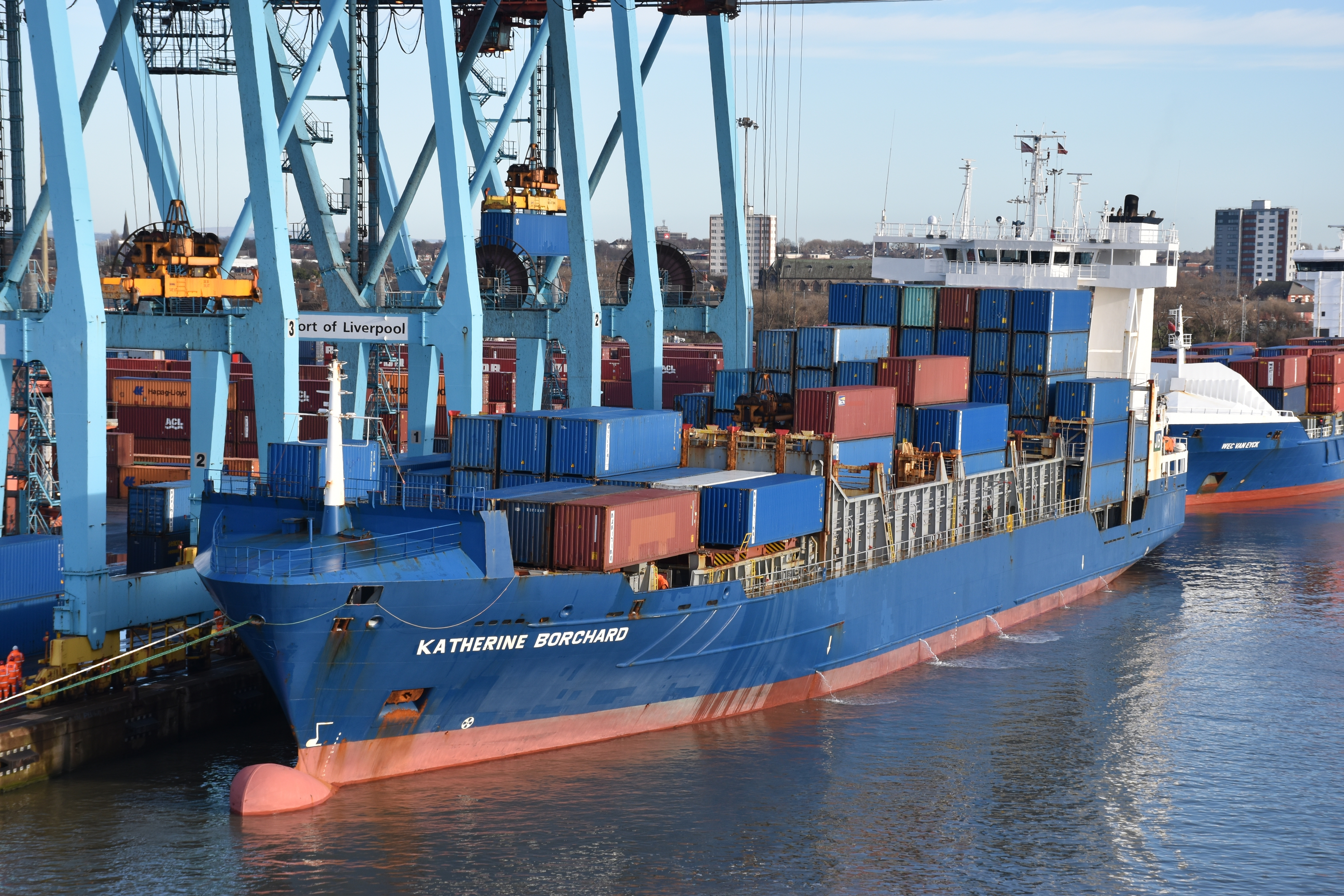
- Interactive map of Port of Liverpool

Location
- Country: United Kingdom
- Location: Liverpool, England

Details
- Operated by: The Peel Group
- Employees: 1000

Statistics
- Website; Port of Liverpool

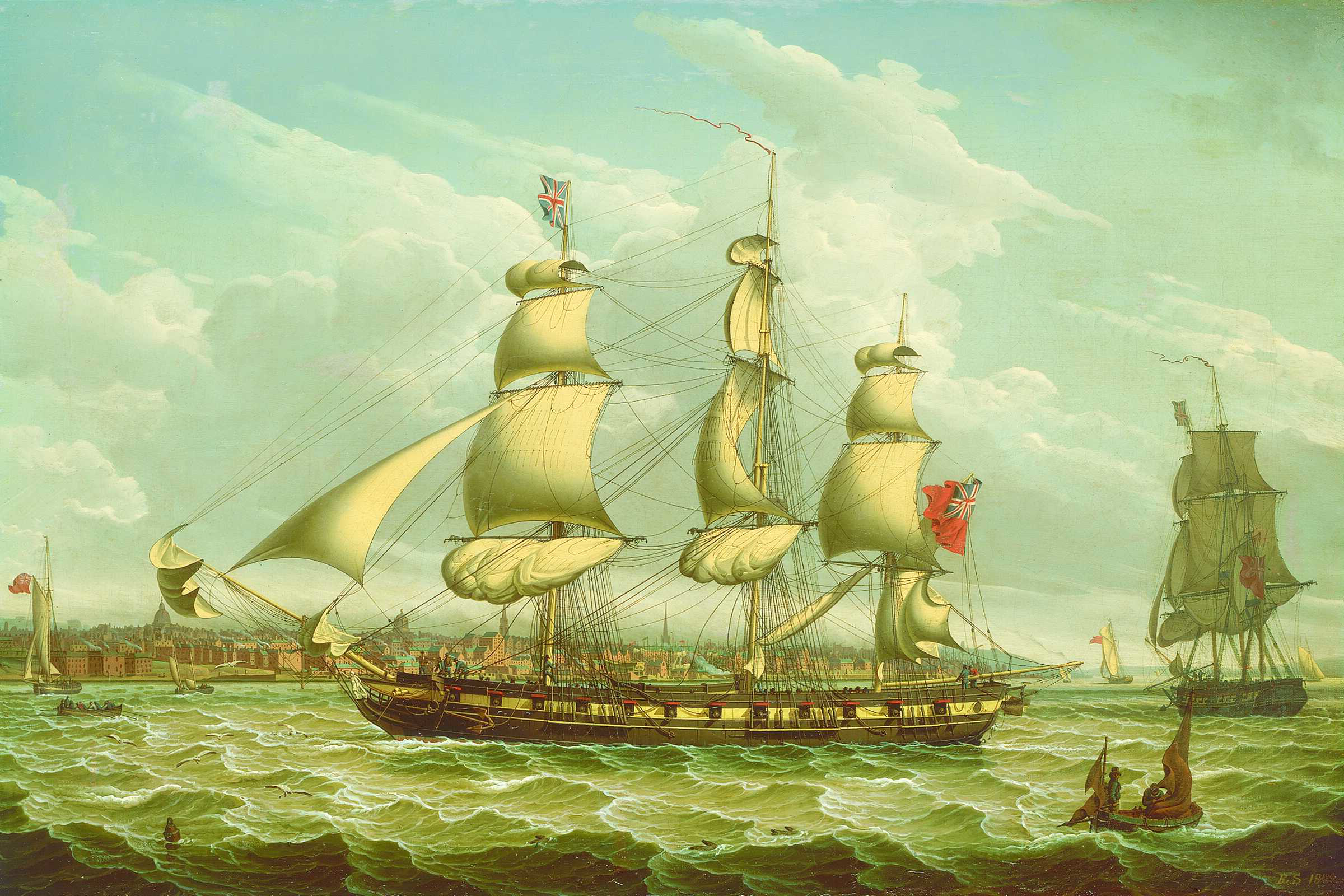
Port of Liverpool in 1809

The Port of Liverpool is a major port on the River Mersey in Liverpool, England, extending from Brunswick Dock in Liverpool to Seaforth Dock in Seaforth, and including the Birkenhead Docks on the western side of the estuary.

Liverpool developed into one of the principal ports of the British Empire during the 18th and 19th centuries and became a major centre of transatlantic trade, migration, and passenger shipping. Liverpool's Old Dock, opened in 1715, was the world's first enclosed commercial dock. By the early 20th century, Liverpool had become one of the world's leading transatlantic passenger ports.

Following the decline of imperial and passenger shipping in the 20th century, the port was redeveloped as a modern freight and container port. It remains one of the United Kingdom's largest ports, handling container, bulk, and cruise traffic. The opening of Liverpool2 in 2016 enabled the port to accommodate Post-Panamax container vessels. Parts of the historic dock system formed the Liverpool Maritime Mercantile City World Heritage Site from 2004 until its delisting by UNESCO in 2021.

== History ==
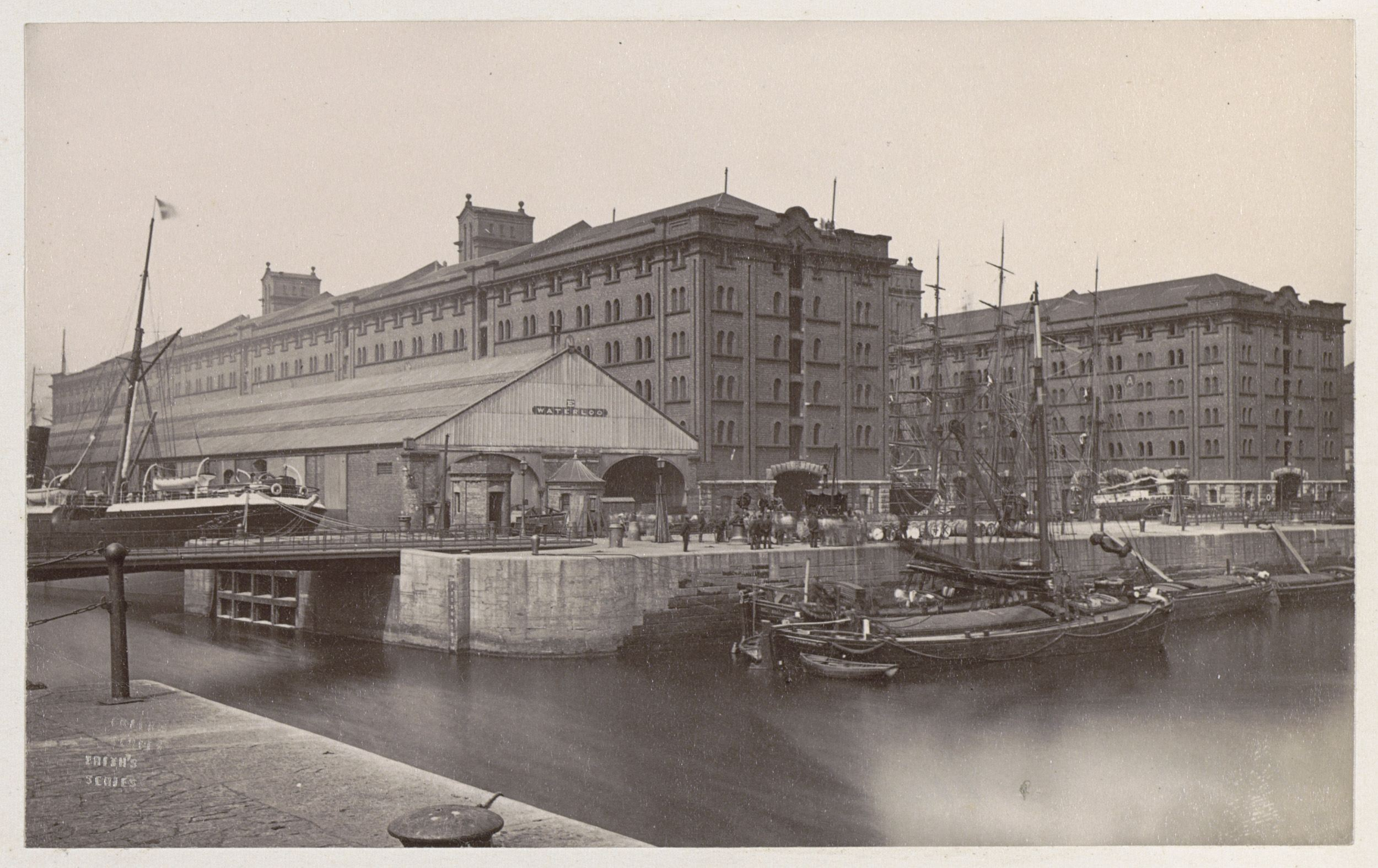
Waterloo Dock in 1890s

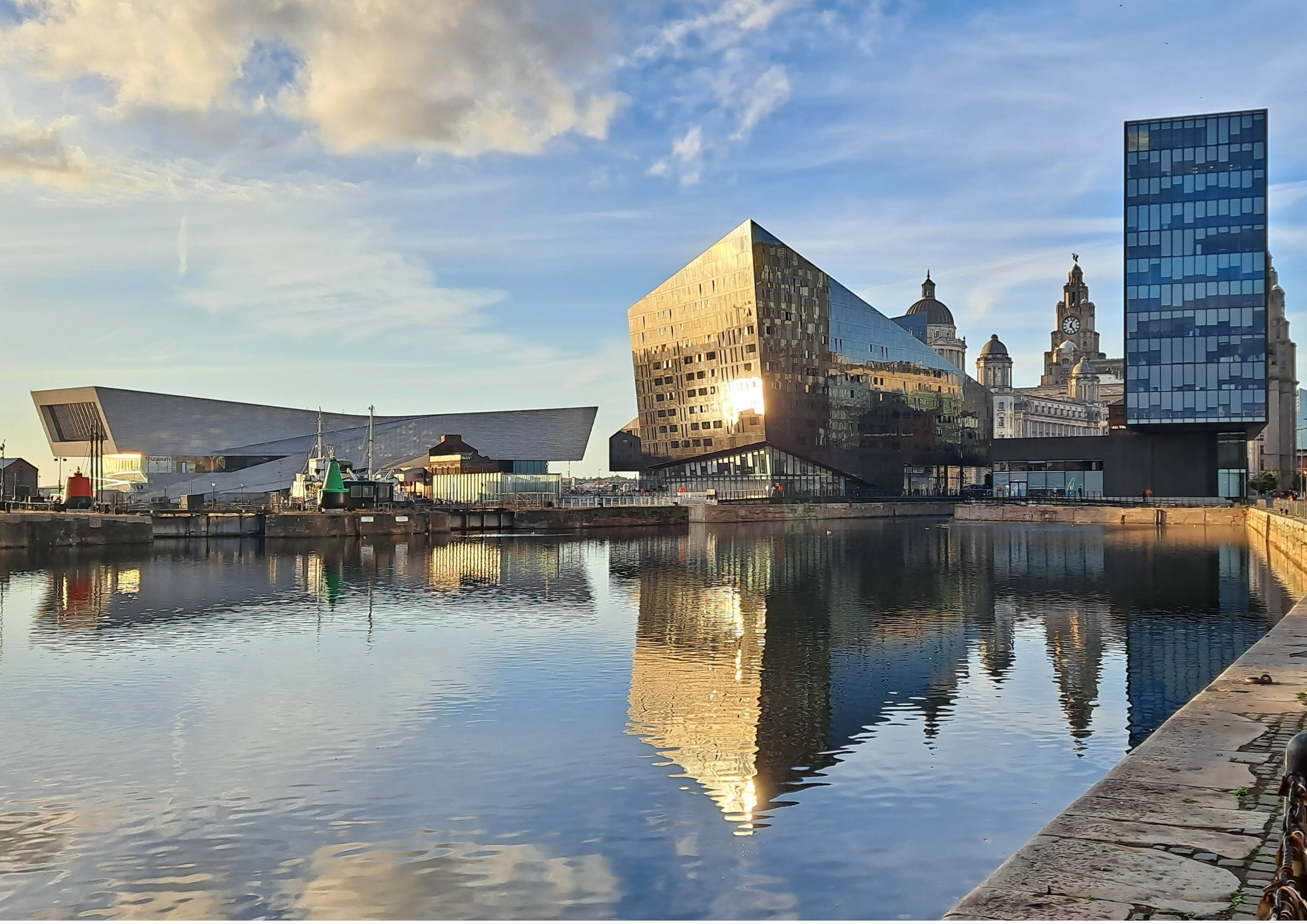
Modern developments at Pier Head and Canning Dock.

=== 1715–1899 ===
Liverpool's first dock was the world's first enclosed commercial dock, the Old Dock, built in 1715. The Lyver Pool, a tidal inlet in the narrows of the estuary, which is now largely under the Liverpool One shopping centre, was converted into the enclosed dock. Further docks were added and eventually all were interconnected by lock gates, extending 7.5 miles (12.1 km) along the Liverpool bank of the River Mersey. From 1830 onwards, most of the building stone was granite from Kirkmabreck near Creetown, Scotland.

The interconnected dock system was the most advanced port system in the world. The docks enabled ship movements within the dock system 24 hours a day, isolated from the high River Mersey tides.

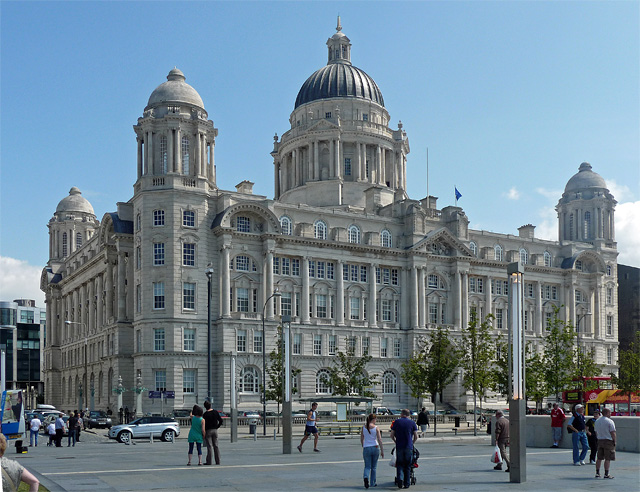
Former Mersey Docks and Harbour Board building

From 1885, the dock system was the hub of a hydraulic power network that stretched beyond the docks. Both White Star Line and Cunard Line were based at the port. It was also the home port of many great ships, including RMS Baltic, RMS Olympic, RMS Mauretania, RMS Aquitania and the ill-starred Tayleur, MV Derbyshire, HMHS Britannic, RMS Lusitania, and the RMS Titanic.

=== 20th century ===
Most of the smaller south end docks were closed in 1971 with Brunswick Dock remaining until closure in 1975.

The largest dock on the dock network, Seaforth Dock, was opened in 1972 and deals with grain and containers, accommodating what were the largest containers ships at that time.

In 1972, Canadian Pacific unit CP Ships was the last transatlantic line to operate from Liverpool.

Many docks have been filled in to create land for buildings: at the Pier Head, an arena at Kings Dock, commercial estates at Toxteth and Harrington Docks and housing at Herculaneum Dock. In the north, some branch docks have been filled in to create land. Sandon and Wellington Docks have been filled in and are now the location of a sewage works. Most of Hornby Dock was filled in to allow Gladstone Dock's coal terminal to expand.

Liverpool Freeport Zone was opened in the North Docks 1984, expanding to include some of the Birkenhead Dock system in 1992. The Euro Rail terminal was established at Seaforth Dock in 1994 and the port expanded five years later, including construction of the Liverpool Intermodal Freeport Terminal.

=== 21st century ===
In 2004, UNESCO announced Liverpool Maritime Mercantile City. Parts of the port were a World Heritage Site from 2004 until 2021.

== Port statistics ==
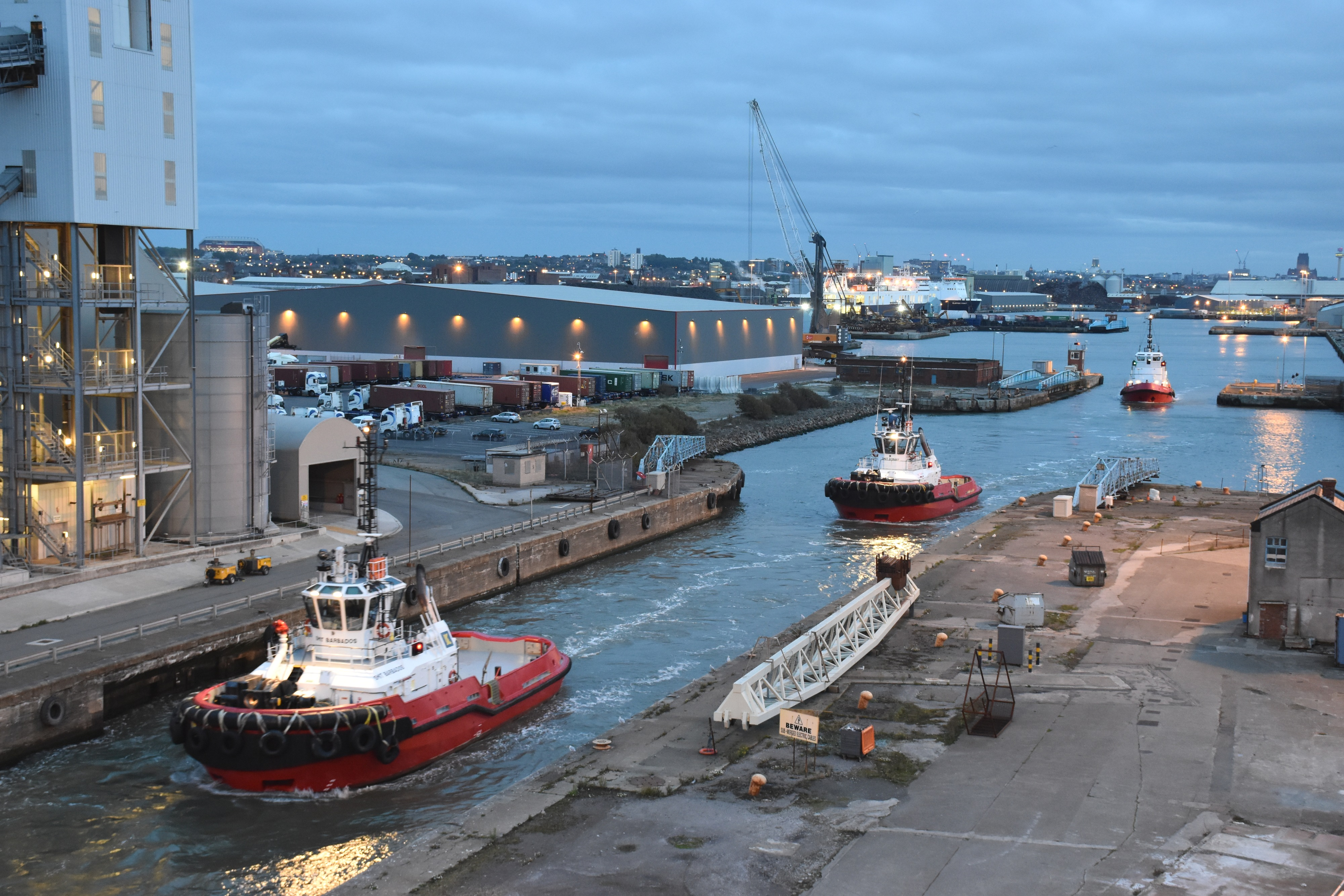
Three tugs transitting the Liverpool dock system, October 2018

In 2020 Liverpool was the United Kingdom's fourth largest port by tonnage of freight, handling 31.1 million tonnes.

Product	2004	2003	2002	2001
Grain	2,289,000 tonnes	2,377,000 tonnes	2,360,000 tonnes	2,455,000 tonnes
Timber	295,000 tonnes	391,000 tonnes	406,000 tonnes	452,000 tonnes
Bulk liquids	774,000 tonnes	727,000 tonnes	788,000 tonnes	707,000 tonnes
Bulk cargo	6,051,000 tonnes	6,296,000 tonnes	5,572,000 tonnes	5,026,000 tonnes
Oil Terminal	11,406,000 tonnes	11,406,000 tonnes	11,604,000 tonnes	11,236,000 tonnes
General cargo	374,000 tonnes	556,000 tonnes	468,000 tonnes	514,000 tonnes
Total	32,171,000 tonnes	31,753,000 tonnes	30,564,000 tonnes	30,501,000 tonnes
Passengers	720,000	734,000	716,000	654,000
Containers	616,000	578,000	535,000	524,000
RoRo (car ferry)	513,000	476,000	502,000	533,000

== Marina ==
Liverpool Marina is in Coburg Dock and has 340 berths.

== Cruise terminal ==
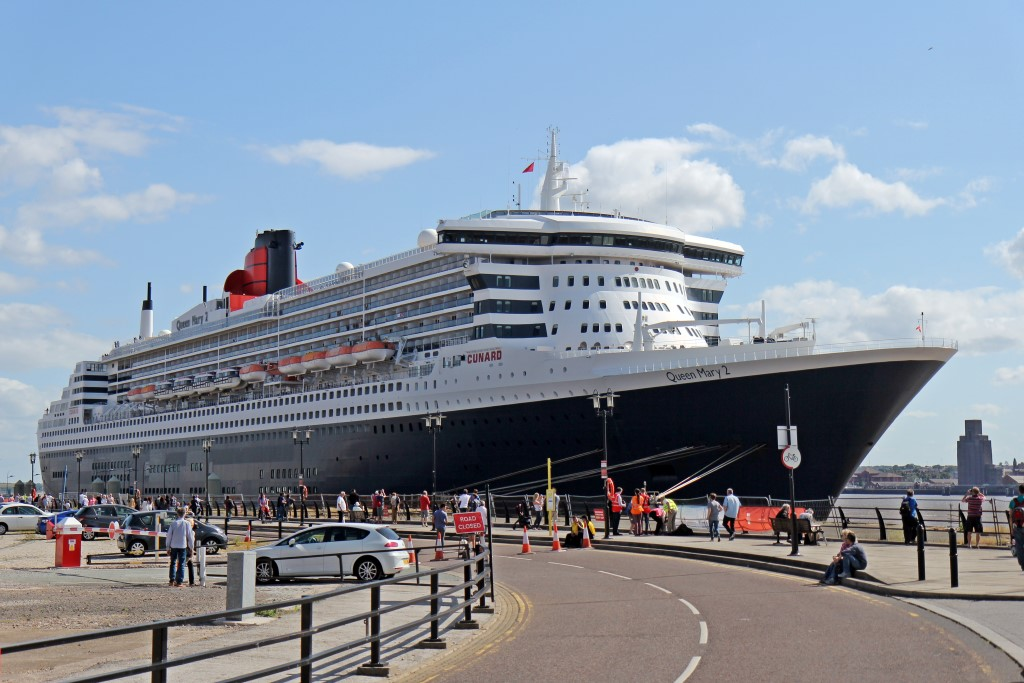
Queen Mary 2 at the Liverpool Cruise Terminal, 2015

Cruise ships once sailed from Langton Dock, part of the enclosed north docks system. Departures and arrivals were subject to tides. Cruise ships returned to Liverpool's Pier Head in 2008, berthing at a newly constructed cruise terminal, enabling departures and arrivals at any time. Until 2012, any cruises beginning in Liverpool still departed from Langton Dock but, since 2012, the terminal has been used as the start and end of voyages, and not merely a stop-off point. This led to a dispute with Southampton due to the large public subsidy provided for the new terminal, which Liverpool City Council has agreed to repay.

Ships which have called at Liverpool Cruise Terminal include Queen Elizabeth 2 (QE2), Grand Princess, Caribbean Princess and RMS Queen Mary 2. A number of large Royal Navy vessels, such as HMS Illustrious and HMS Ark Royal, have also visited the terminal.

== Rail connections ==
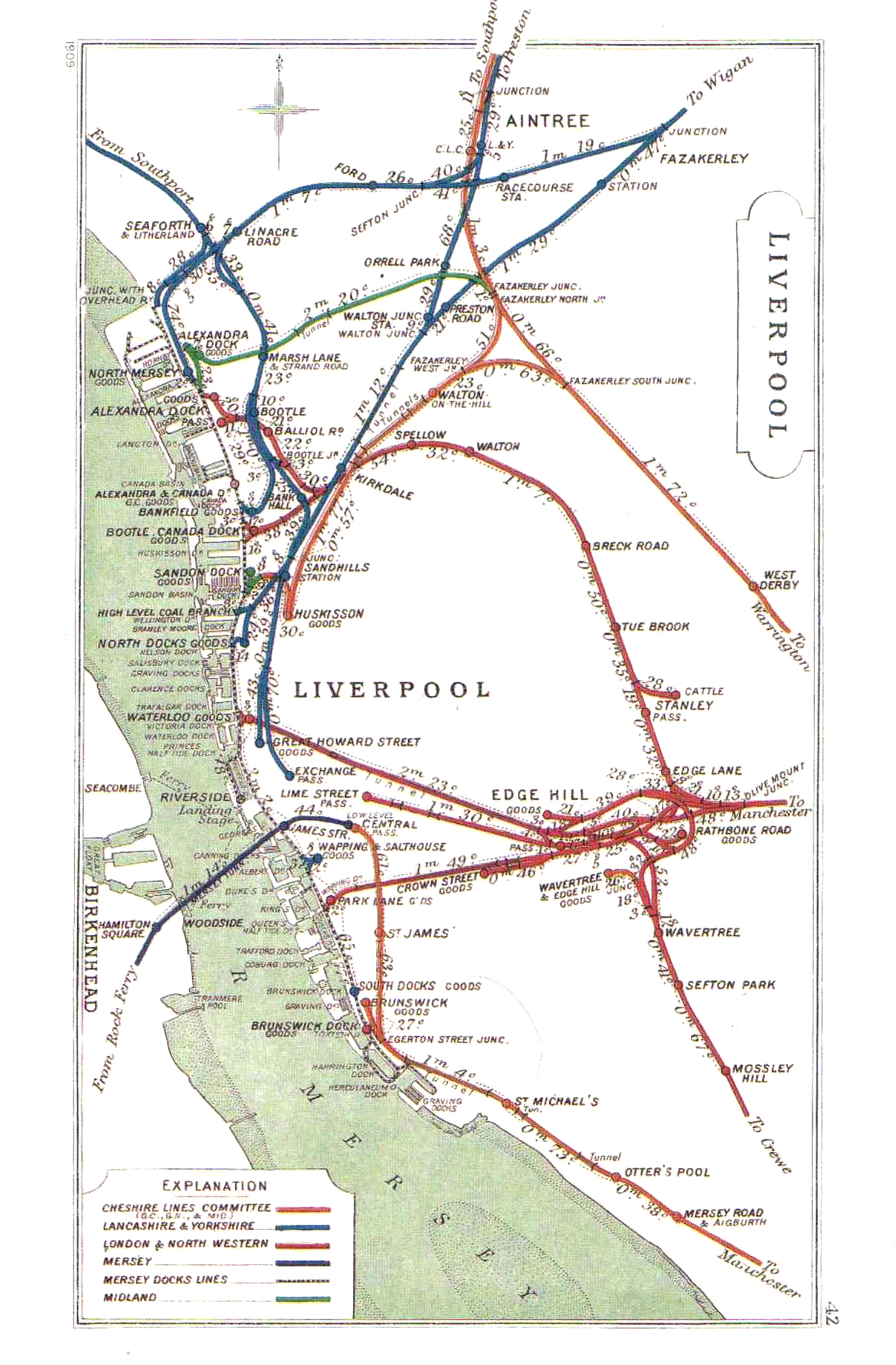
The extent of the Liverpool Docks rail network in 1909

At one point the Mersey Docks and Harbour Company freight railway totalled 104 mi (167 km) of rail track, with connections to many other railways. A section of freight rail line ran under the Liverpool Overhead passenger railway, with trains constantly crossing the Dock Road from the docks into the freight terminals. Today, only the Canada Dock branch line is used to serve the docks, using diesel locomotives.

The first rail link to the docks was the construction of the 1830 Park Lane railway goods station opposite the Queen's Dock in the south of the city. The terminal was accessed via the 1.26 mi (2.03 km) Wapping Tunnel from Edge Hill rail junction in the east of the city. The station was demolished in 1972. The tunnel is still intact.

Until 1971, Liverpool Riverside railway station served the liner terminal at the Pier Head. Today, for passengers disembarking from the new cruise terminal, city centre circular buses call at the terminal directly, while Moorfields and James Street are the nearest Merseyrail stations.

On the opposite side of the river, the Birkenhead Dock Branch served the docks between 1847 and 1993. This route remains intact, albeit disused.

== Quotations ==
"For more than six weeks, the ship Highlander lay in Prince's Dock; and during that time, besides making observations upon things immediately around me, I made sundry excursions to the neighbouring docks, for I never tired of admiring them.

Previous to this, having only seen the miserable wooden wharves, and slip-shod, shambling piers of New York, the sight of these mighty docks filled my young mind with wonder and delight...

In Liverpool, I beheld long China walls of masonry; vast piers of stone; and a succession of granite-rimmed docks, completely inclosed, and many of them communicating, which almost recalled to mind the great American chain of lakes: Ontario, Erie, St. Clair, Huron, Michigan, and Superior. The extent and solidity of these structures, seemed equal to what I had read of the old Pyramids of Egypt...

For miles you may walk along that river-side, passing dock after dock, like a chain of immense fortresses: Prince's, George's, Salt-House, Clarence, Brunswick, Trafalgar, King's, Queen's and many more."

— Herman Melville, Redburn - his first voyage, 1849

"It is a region, this seven-mile sequence of granite-lipped lagoons, which is invested ... with some conspicuous properties of romance; and yet its romance is never of just that quality one might perhaps expect ... Neither of the land nor of the sea, but possessing both the stability of the one and the constant flux of the other—too immense, too filled with the vastness of the outer, to carry any sense of human handicraft—this strange territory of the Docks seems, indeed, to form a kind of fifth element, a place charged with daemonic issues and daemonic silences, where men move like puzzled slaves, fretting under orders they cannot understand, fumbling with great forces that have long passed out of their control ..."

— Walter Dixon Scott, Liverpool, 1907

"...Liverpool is the biggest port ... there was something to see from Dingle up to Bootle, and as far again as Birkenhead on the other side. Yellow water, bellowing steam ferries, white trans-atlantic liners, towers, cranes, stevedores, skiffs, shipyards, trains, smoke, chaos, hooting, ringing, hammering, puffing, the ruptured bellies of the ships, the stench of horses, the sweat, urine and waste from all the continents of the world ... and if I heaped up words for another half an hour, I wouldn't achieve the full number, confusion and expanse which is called Liverpool."

— Karel Čapek, Letters from England, 1924

"...Old photographs and even the print of Liverpool Docks as seen from the overhead railway would fail to convey the powerful reality of the Port of Liverpool in the 1950s. This was at the time when every berth had a ship alongside, vessels were waiting off the Port to enter, and they were waiting off the locks on both sides of the river. There were seemingly endless queues of lorries on the Dock Road stretched as far as the eye could see. Delivering exports right up to closing day."

— Francis Major, Ports of Liverpool, The Memoir Club

== Image gallery ==
1909 maps

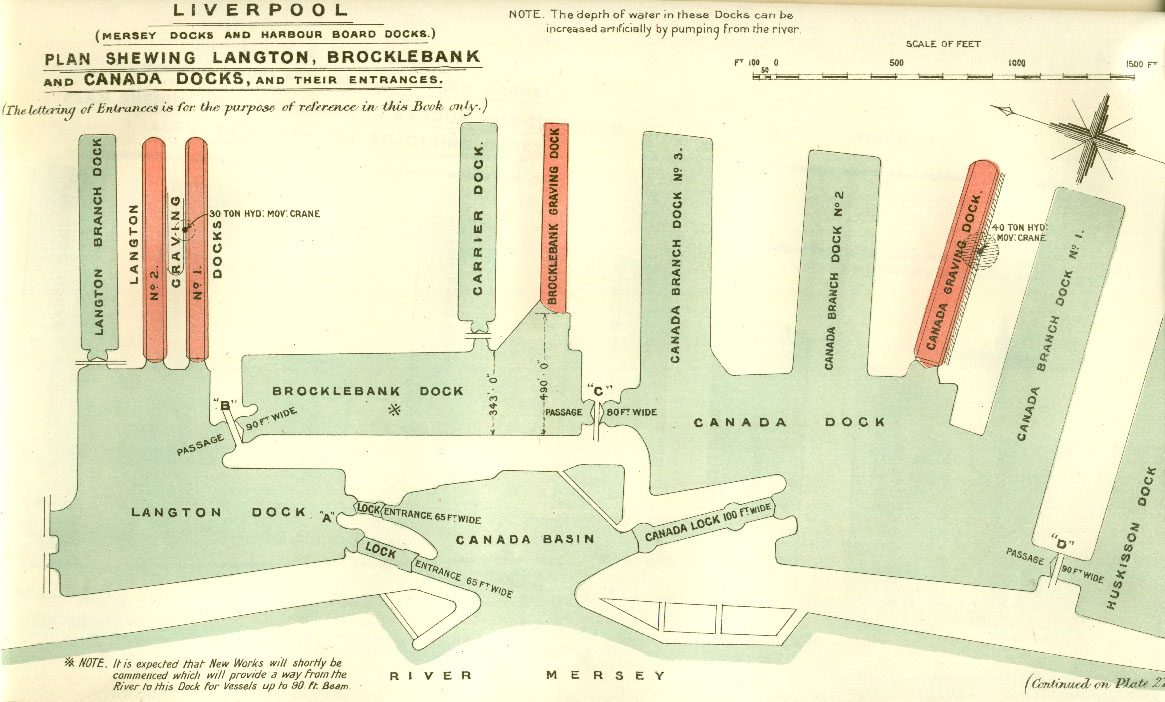

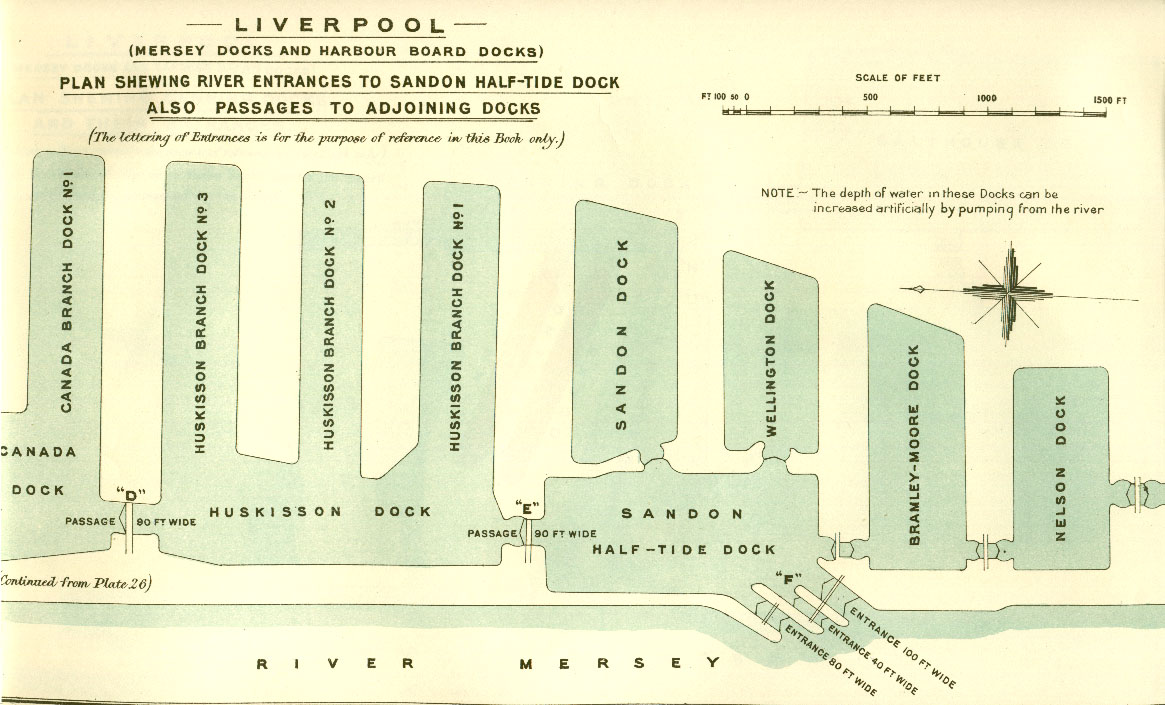

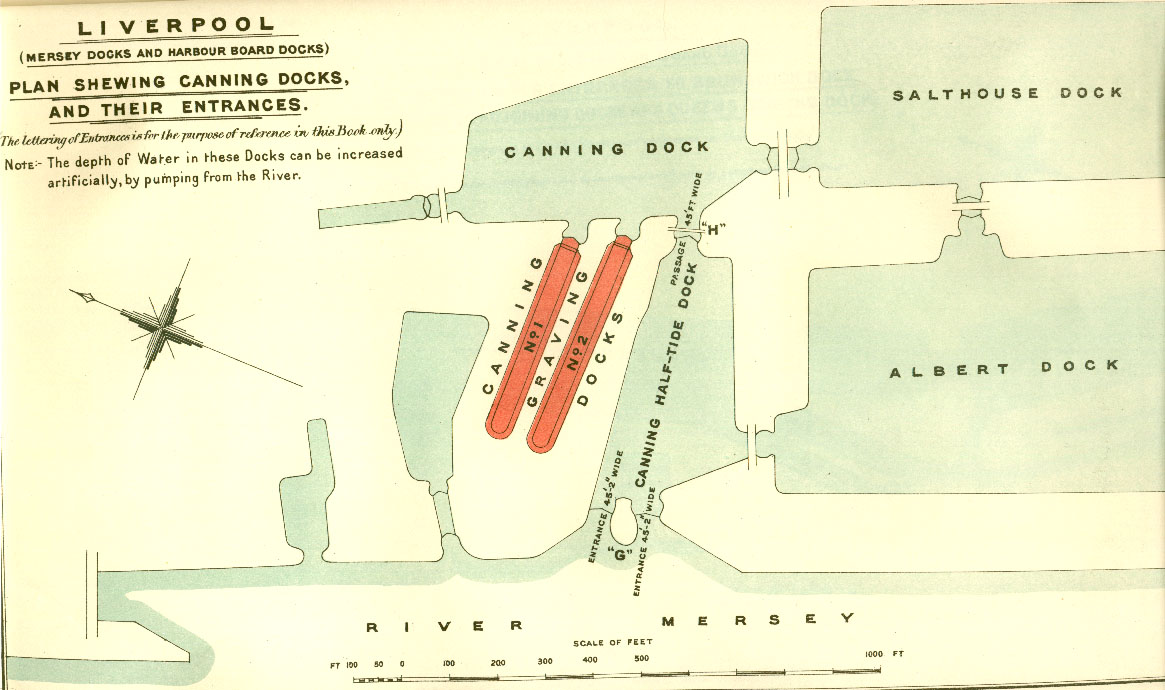

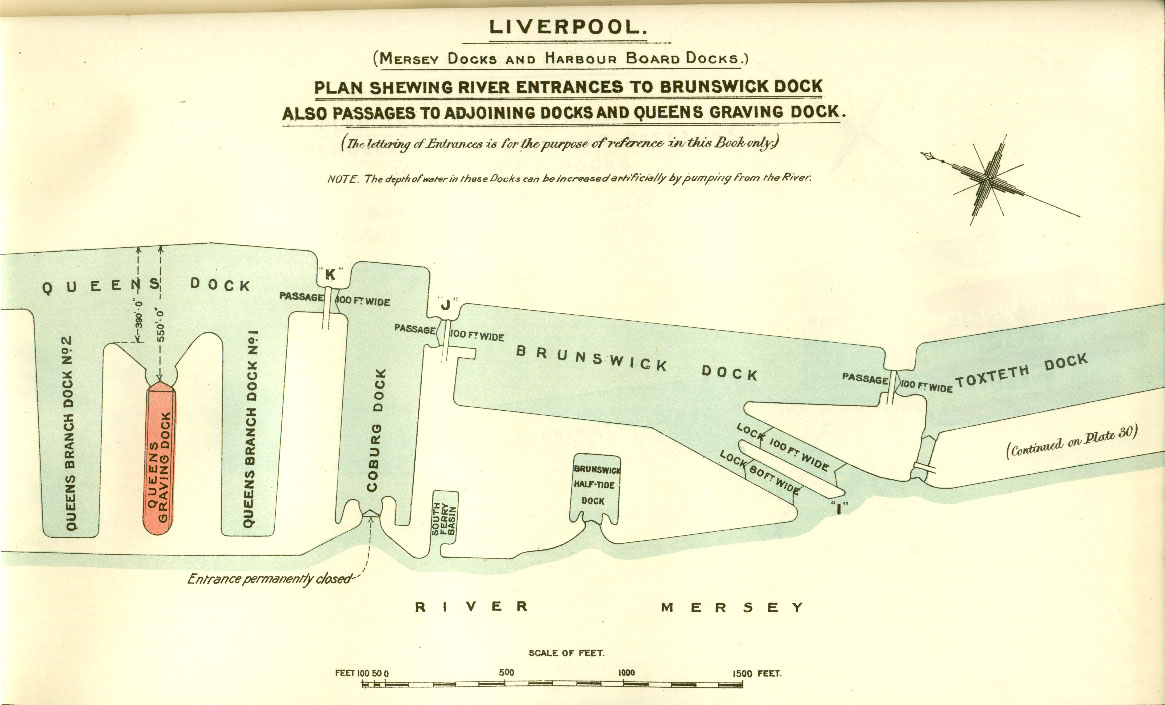

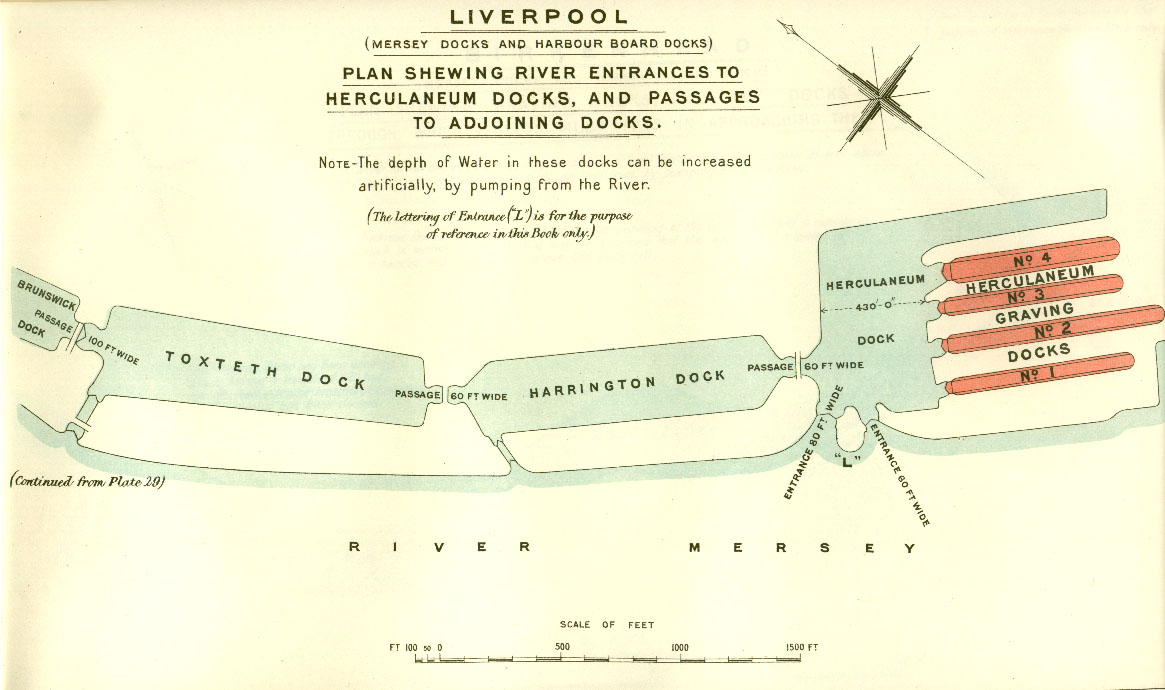
Modern images

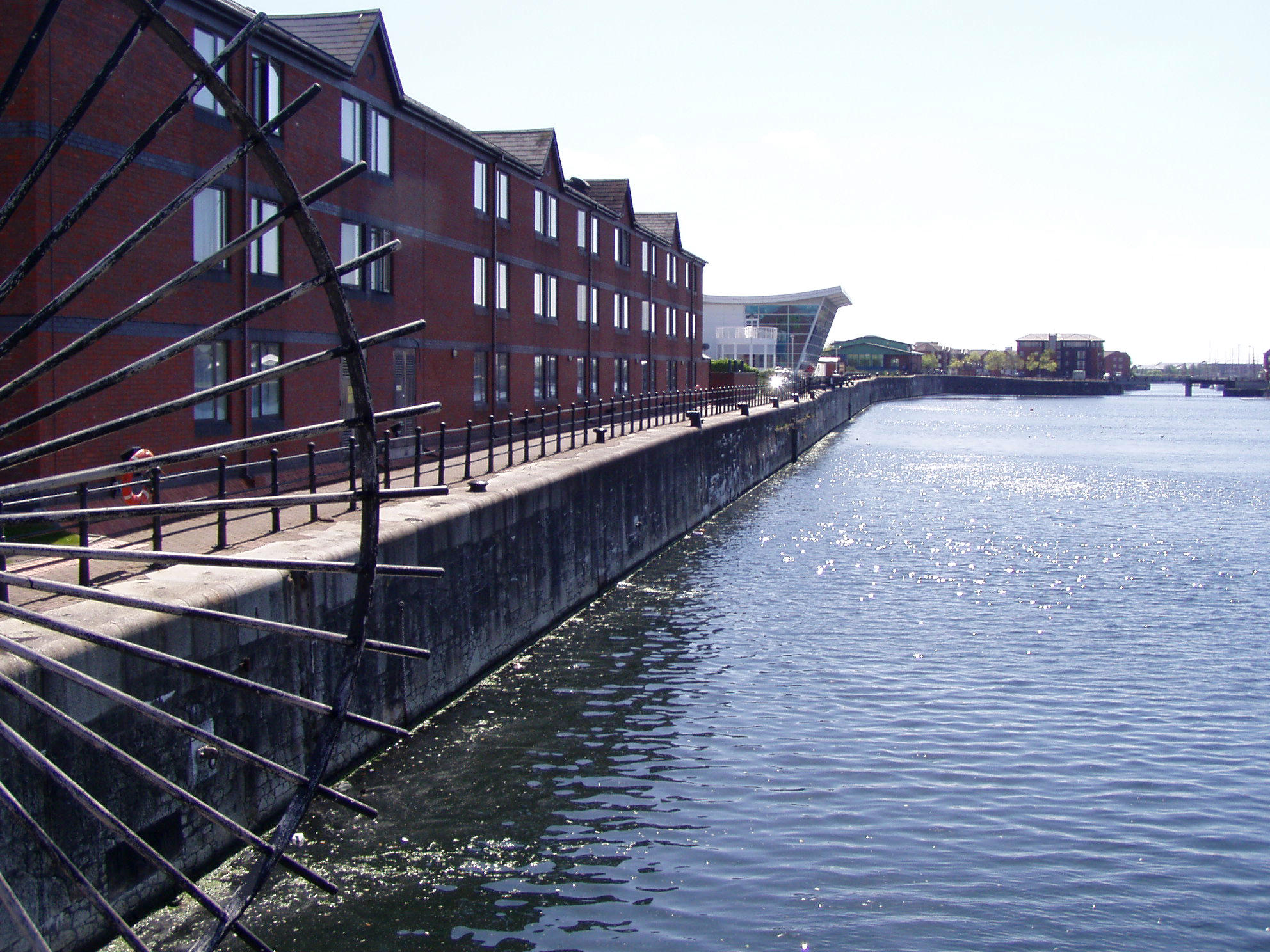

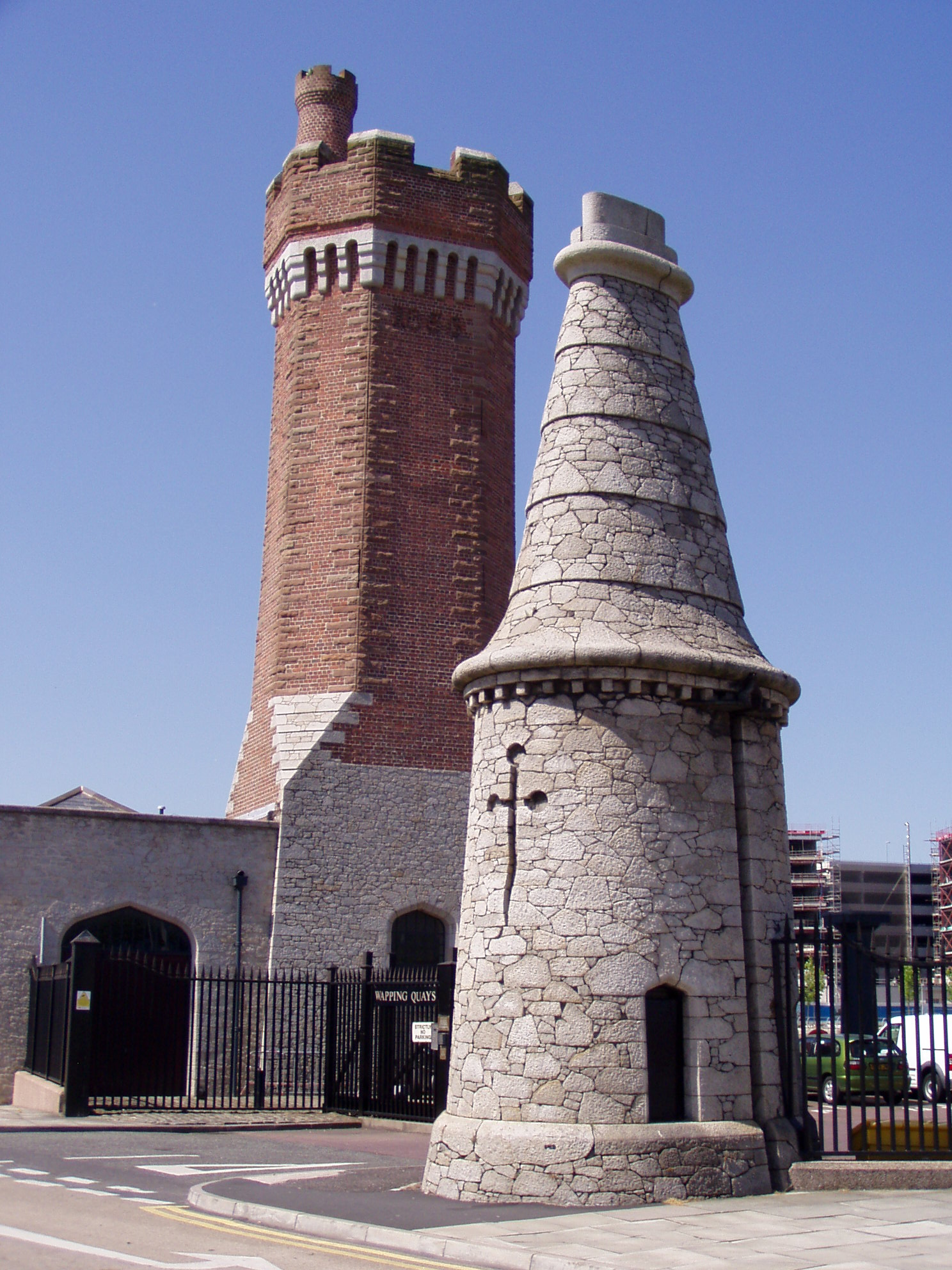

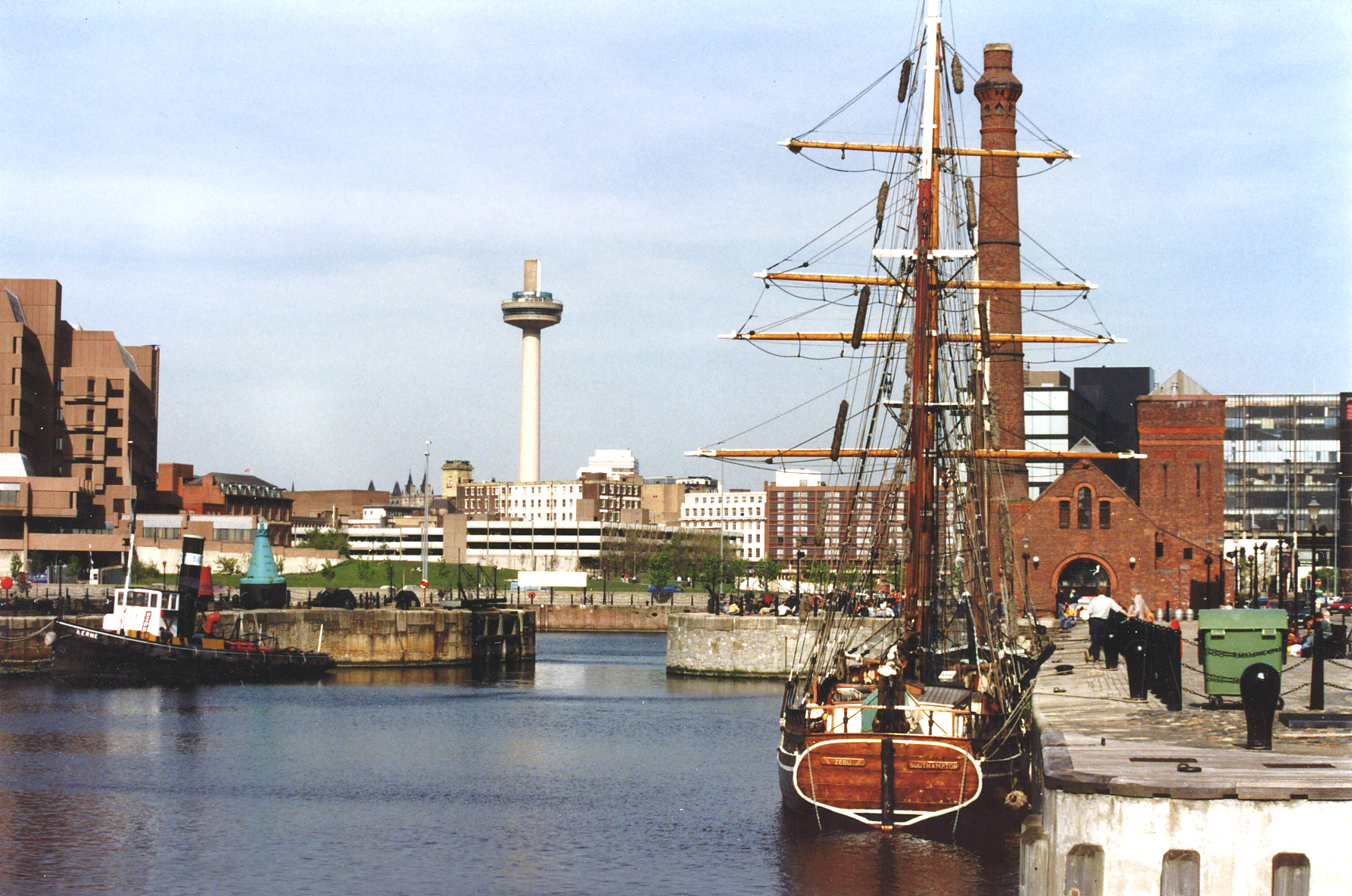

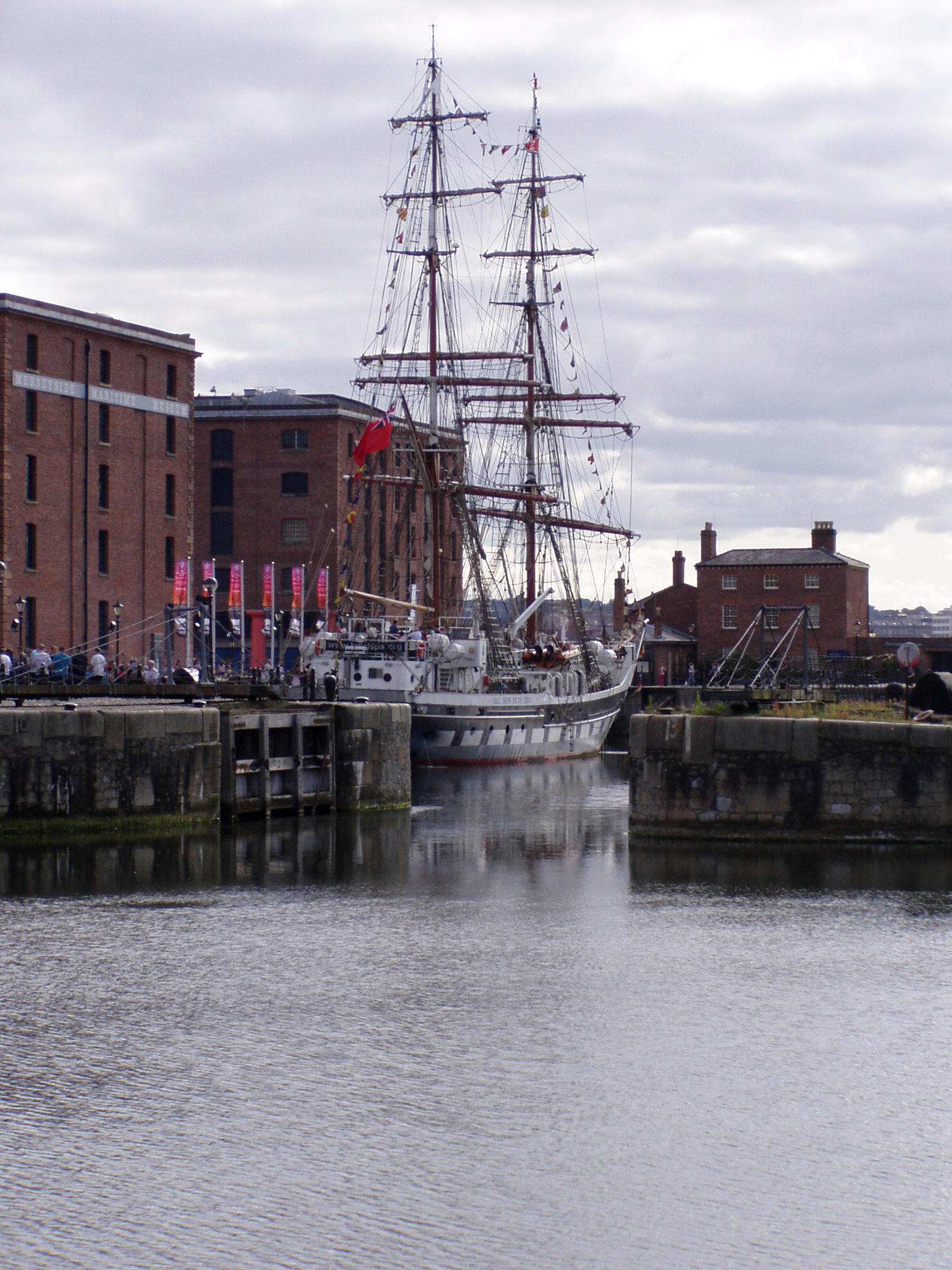

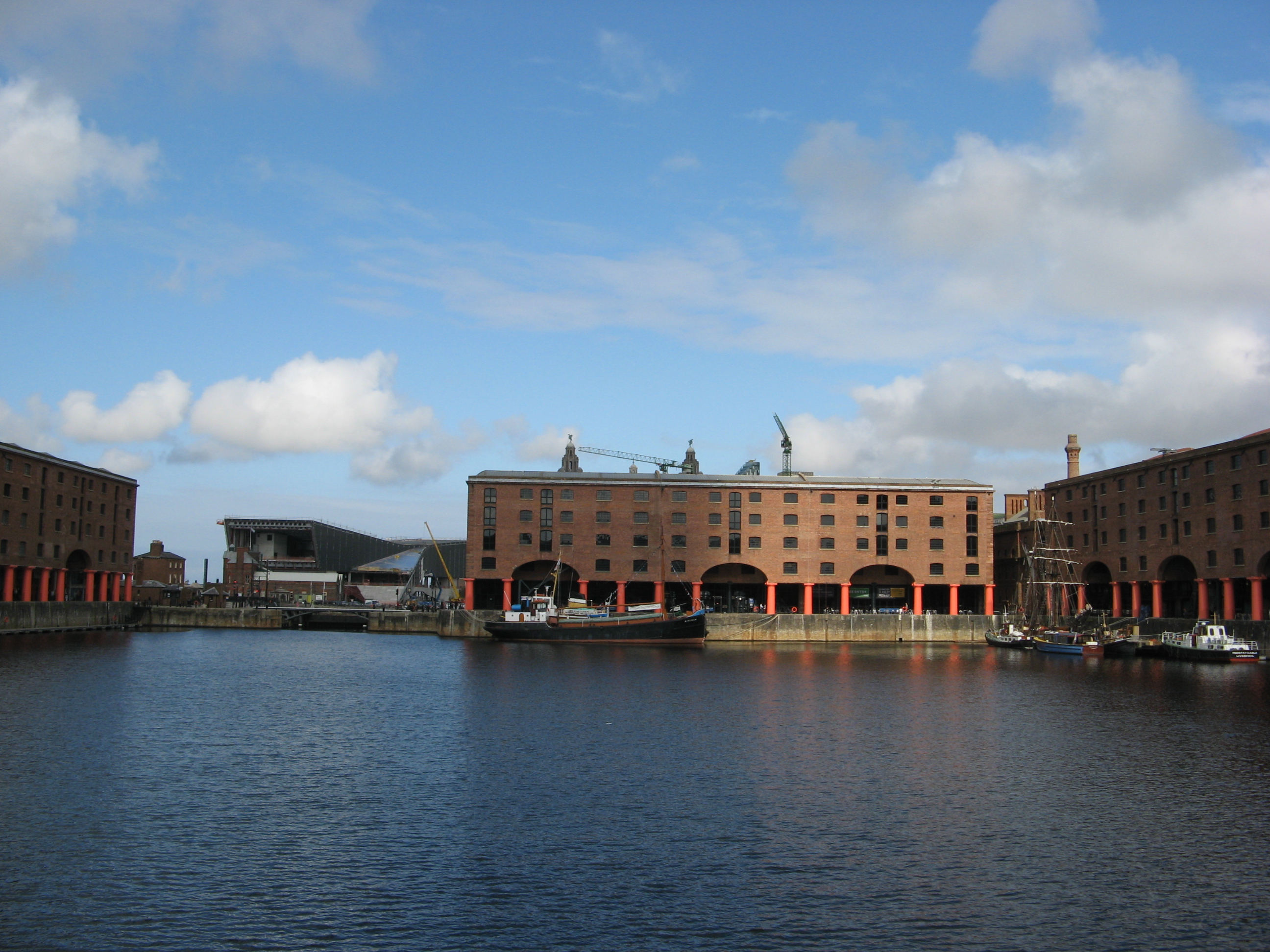

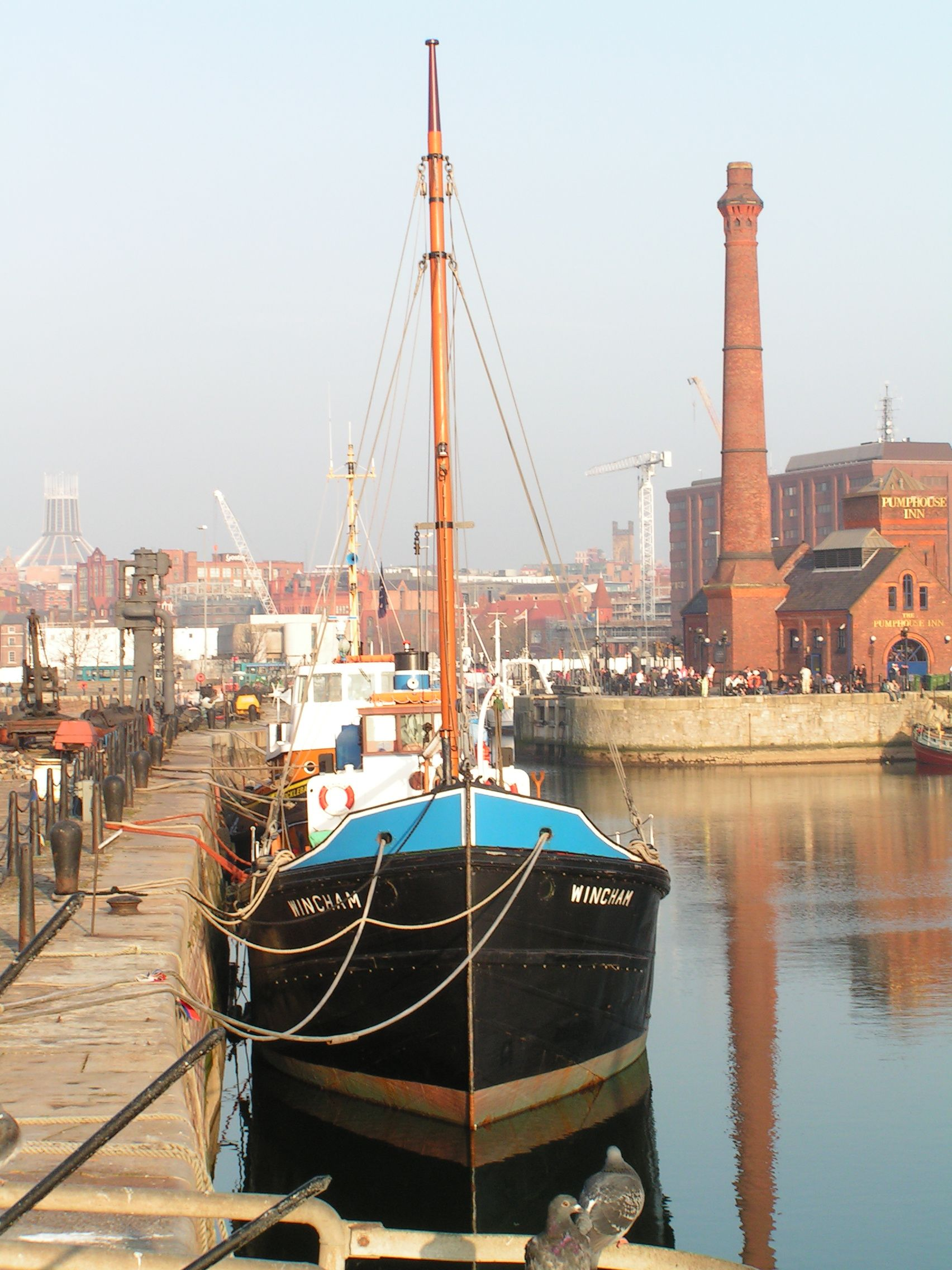

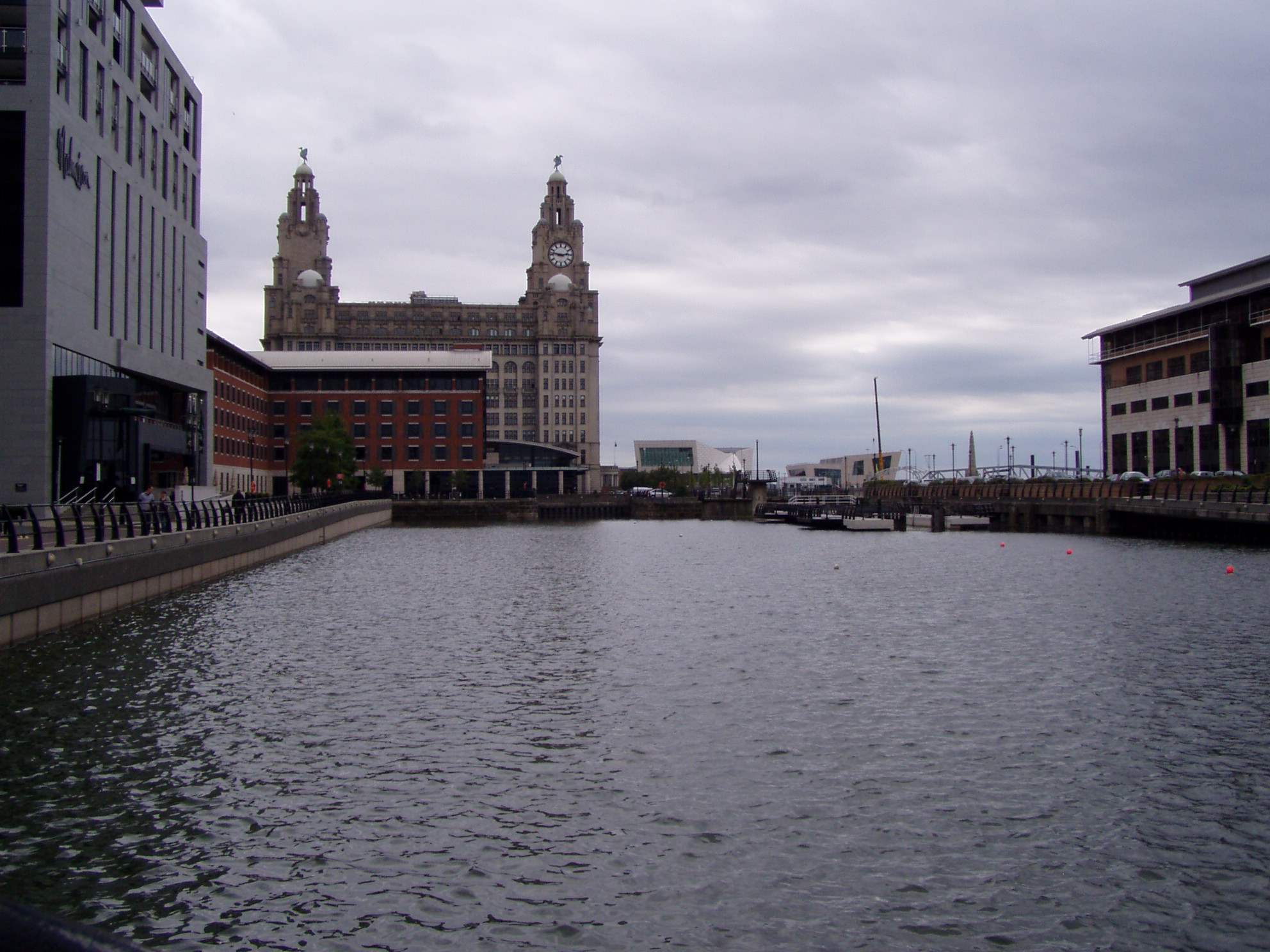

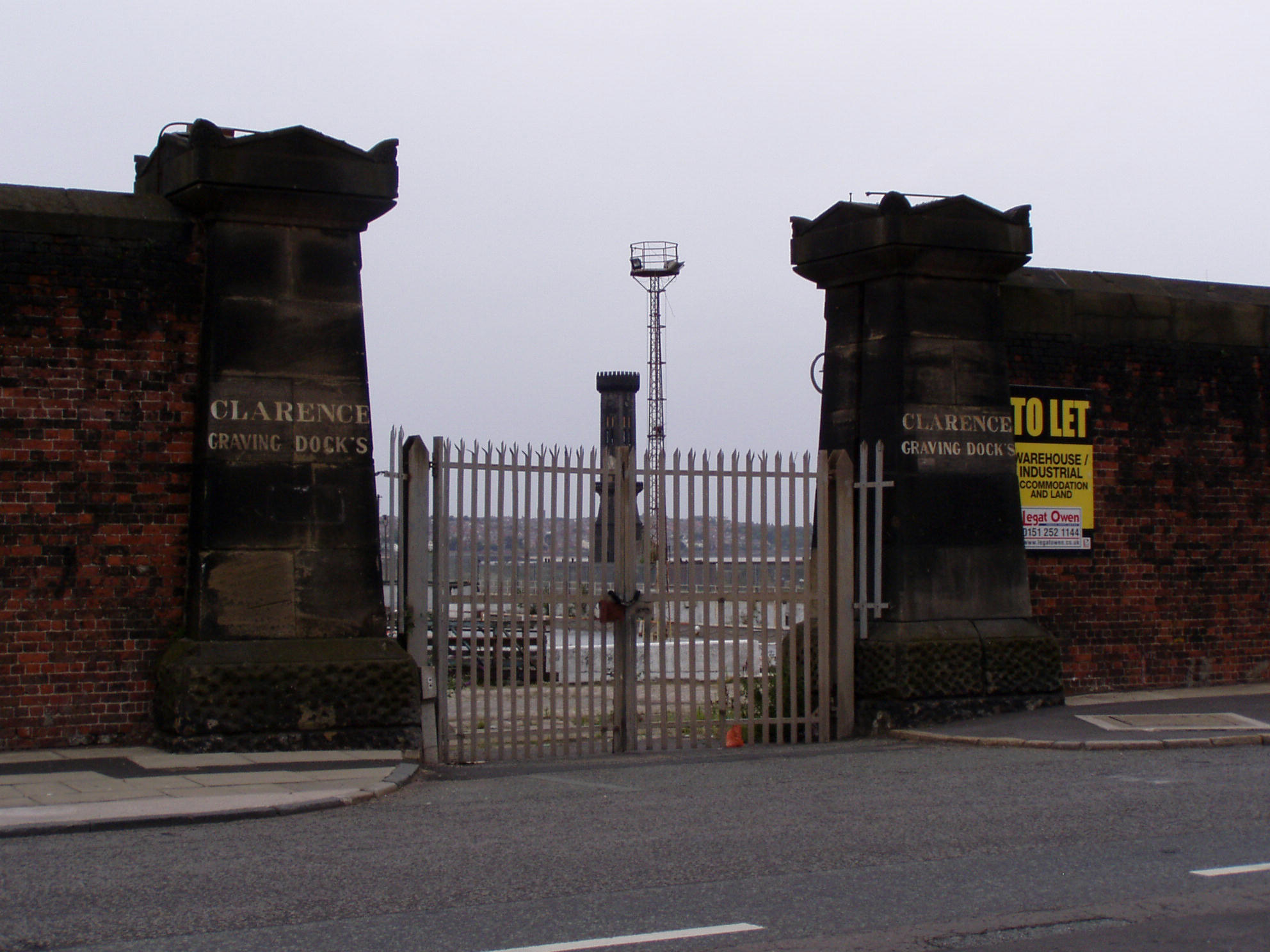

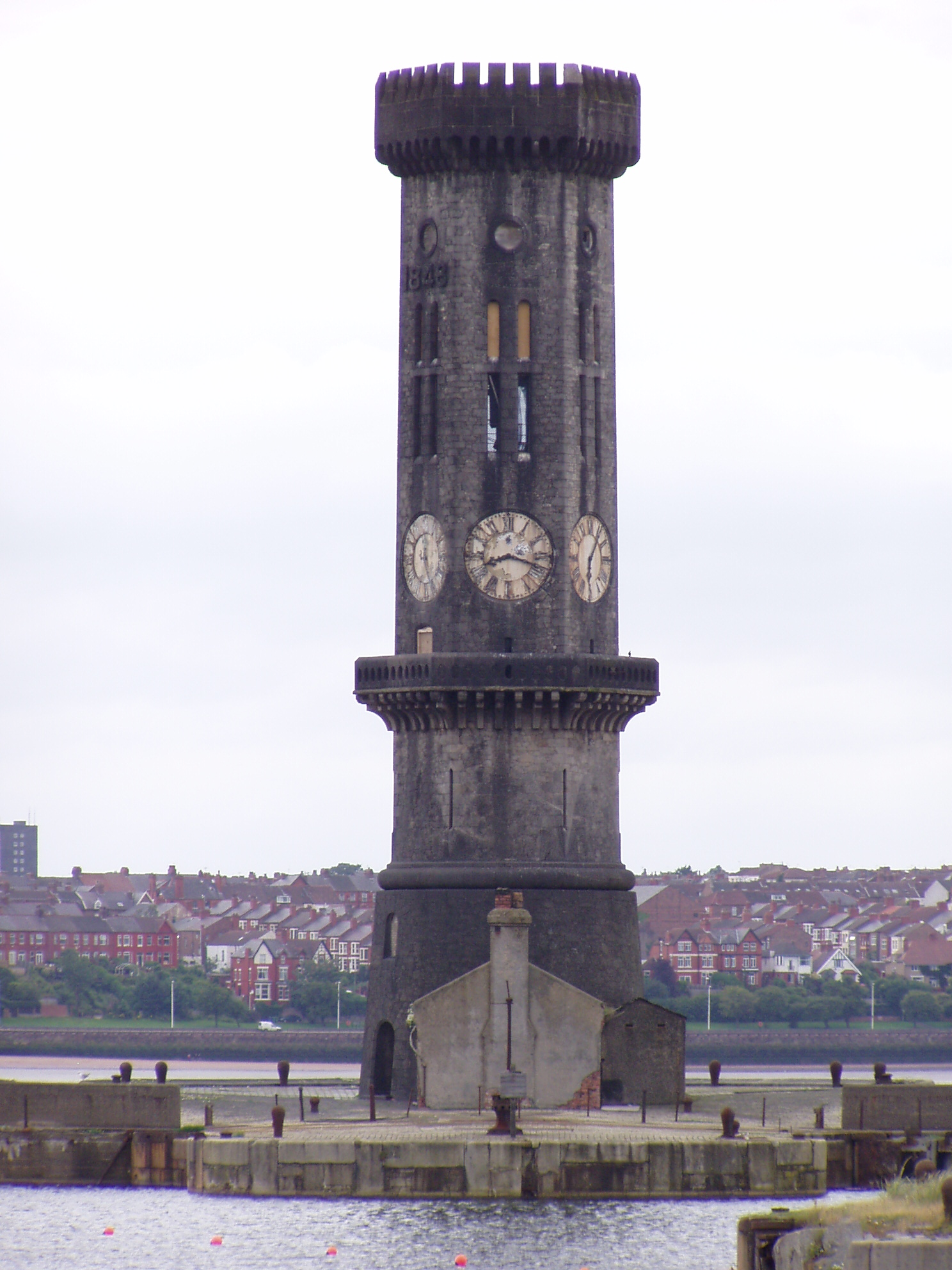

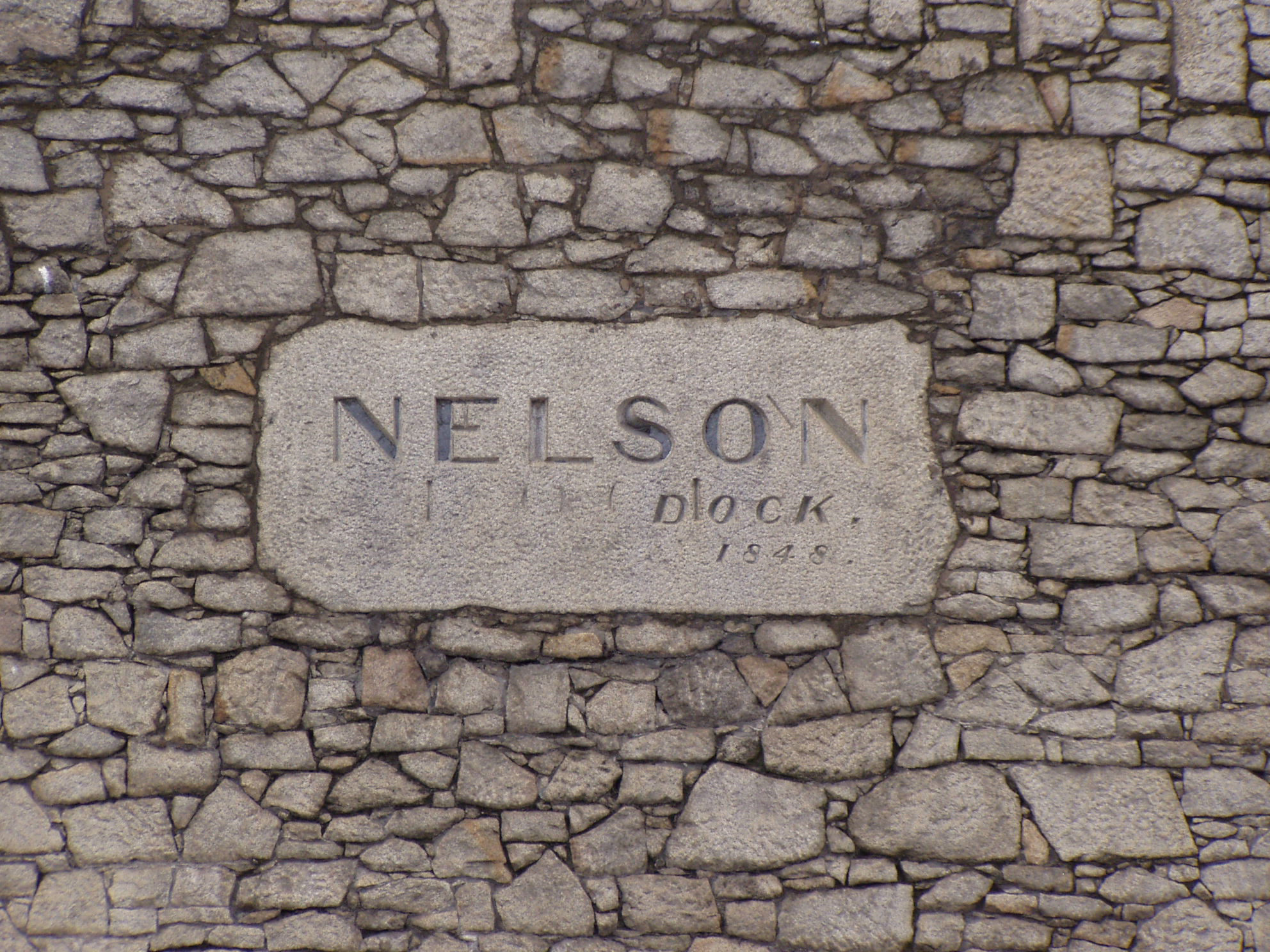

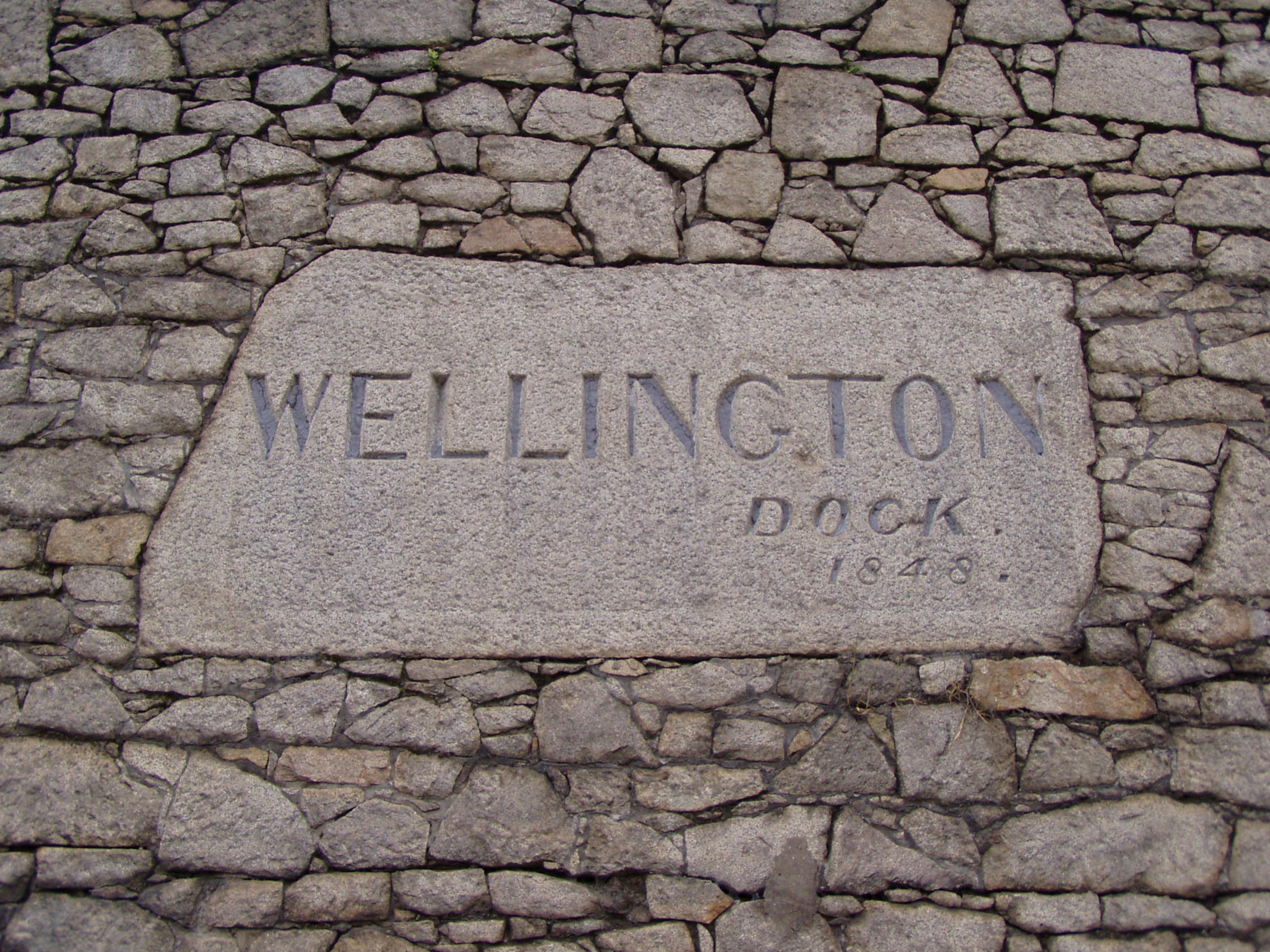

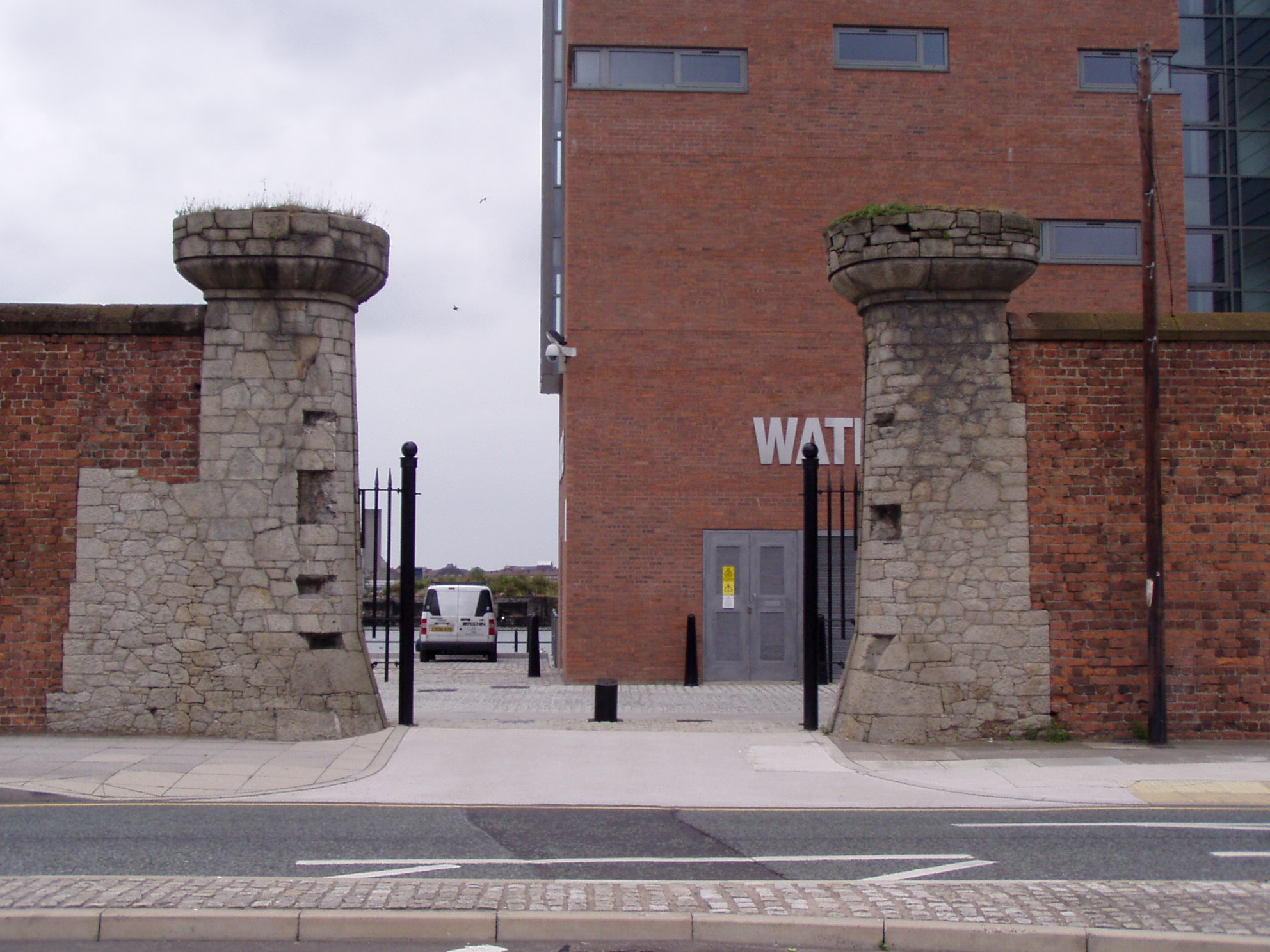

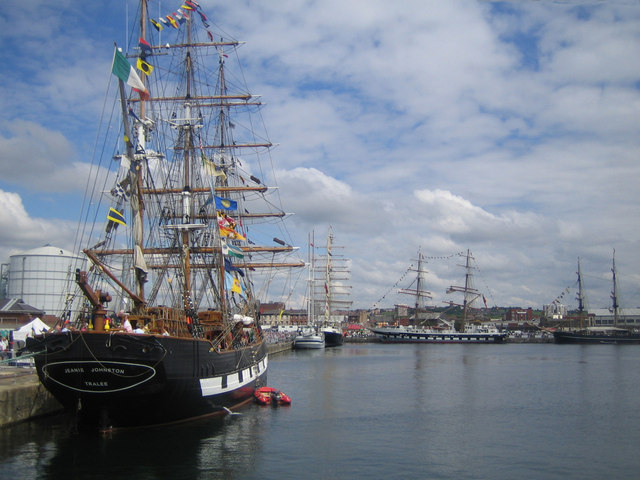

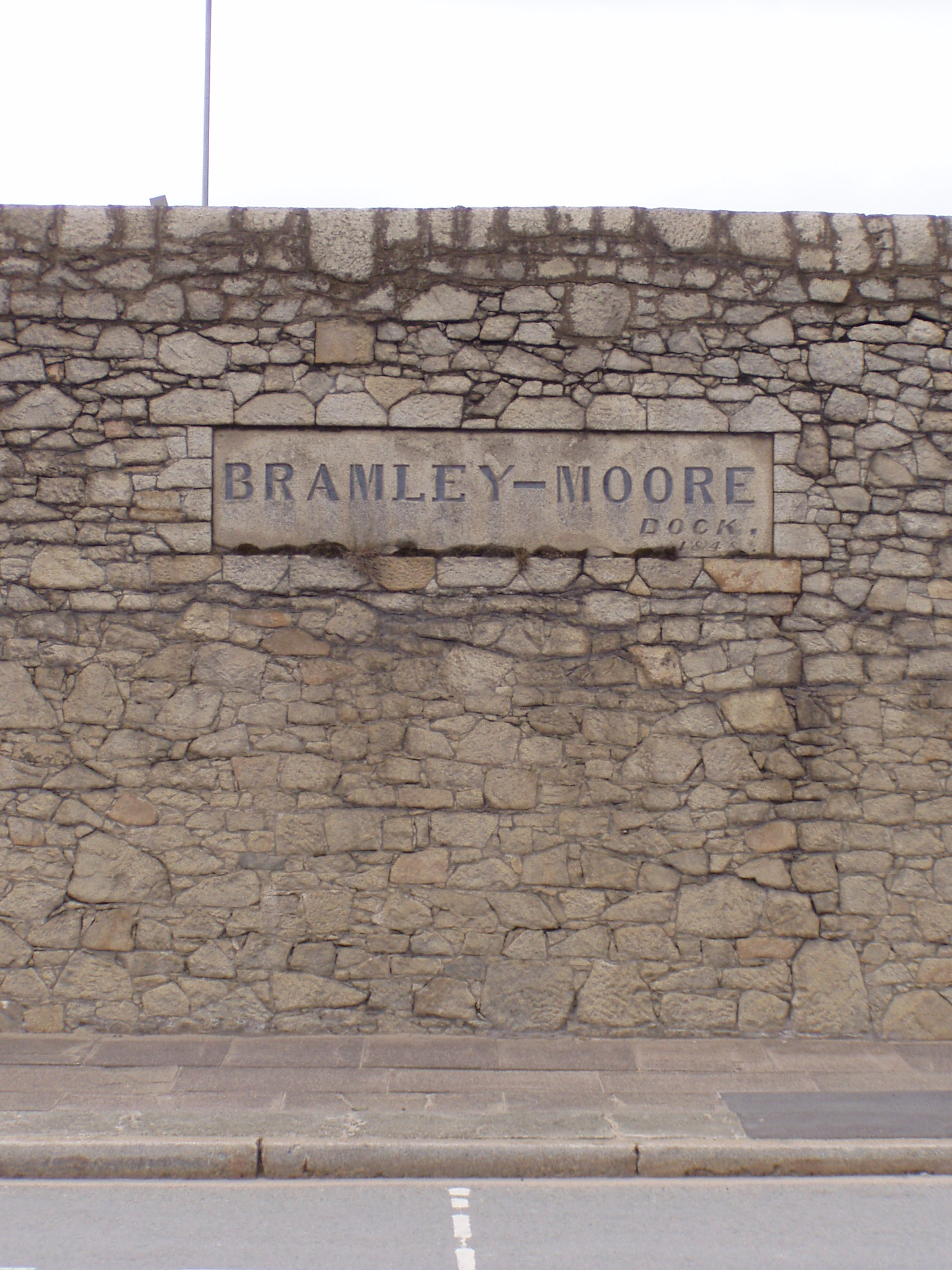

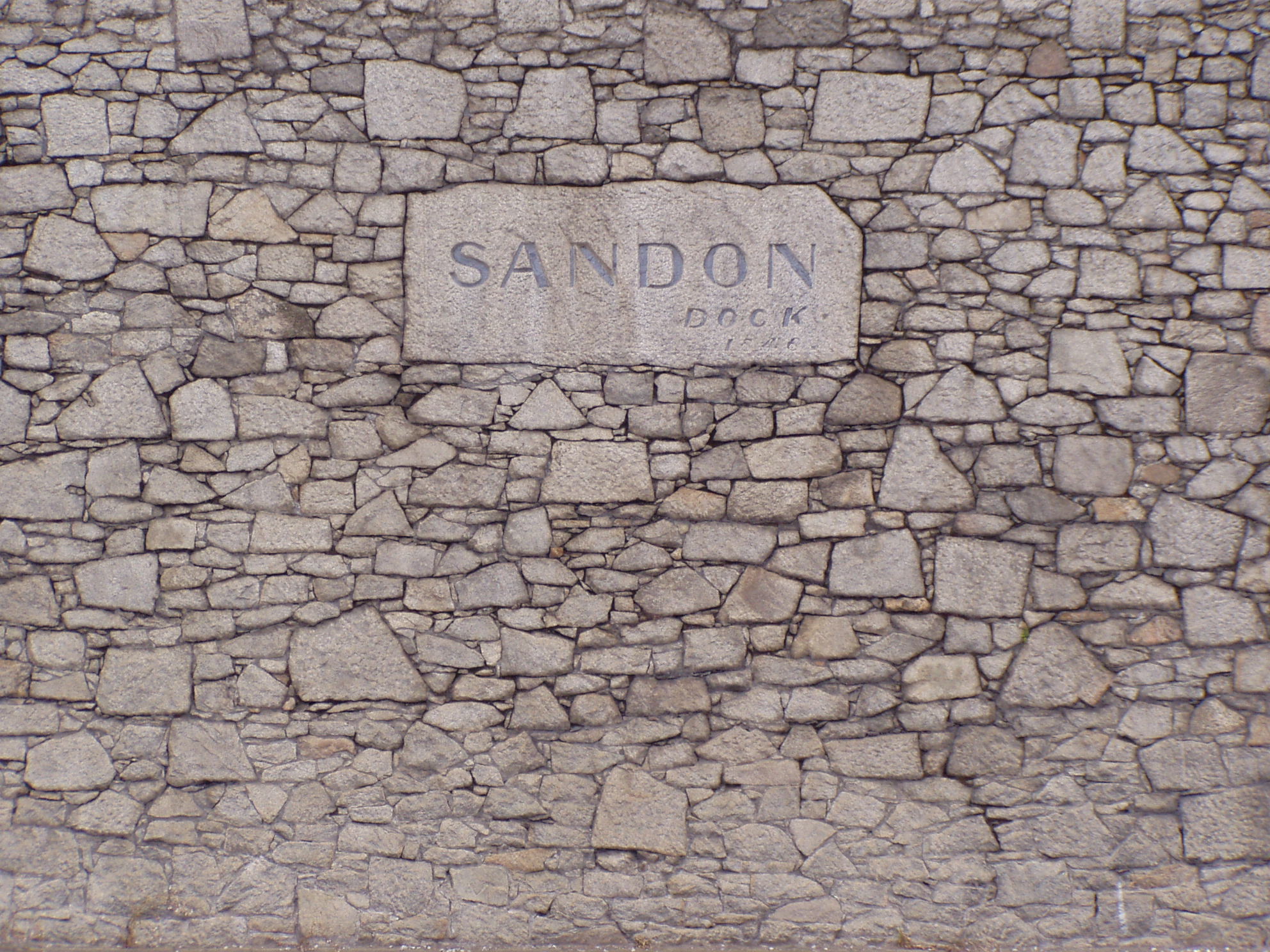

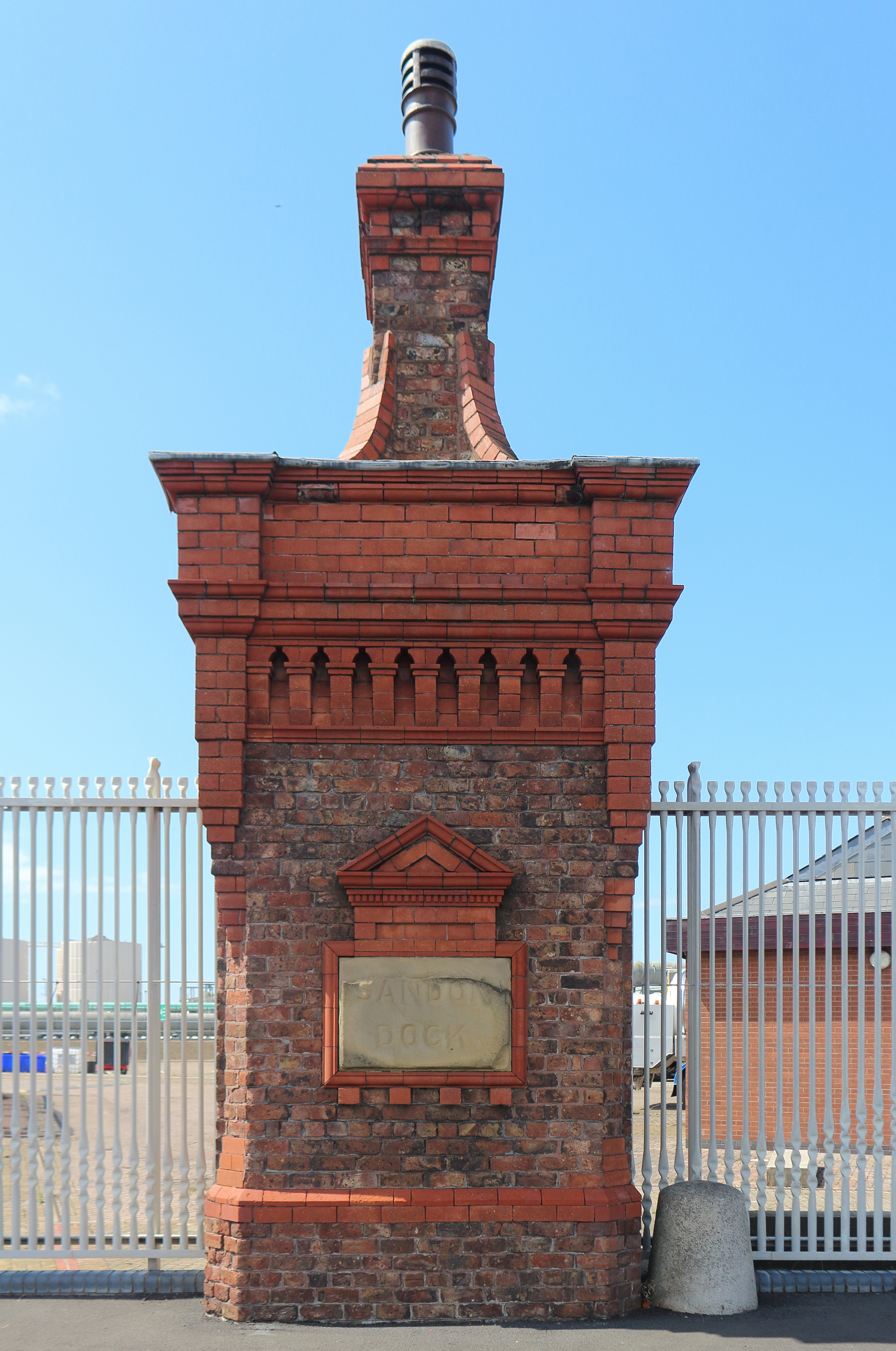

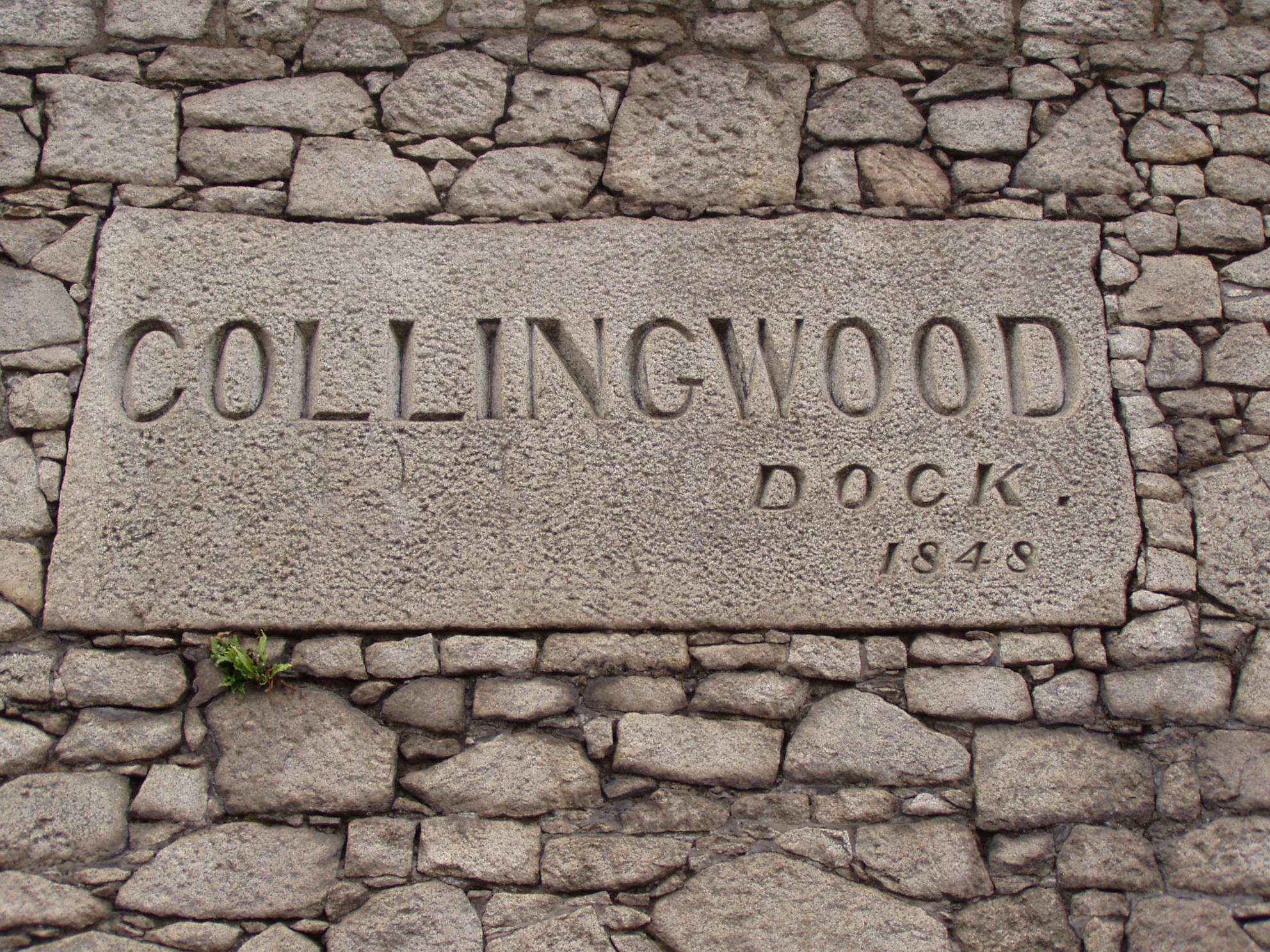

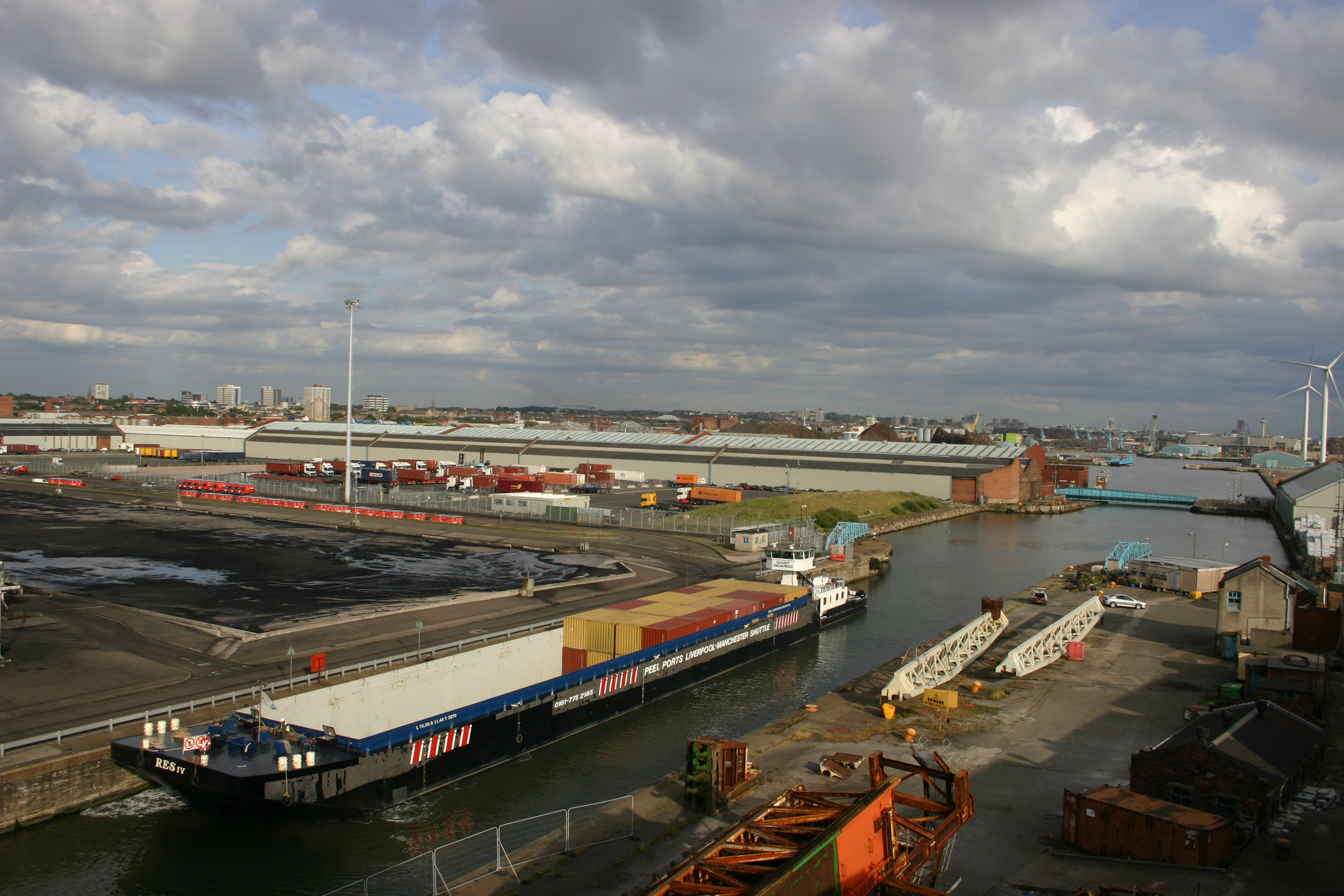

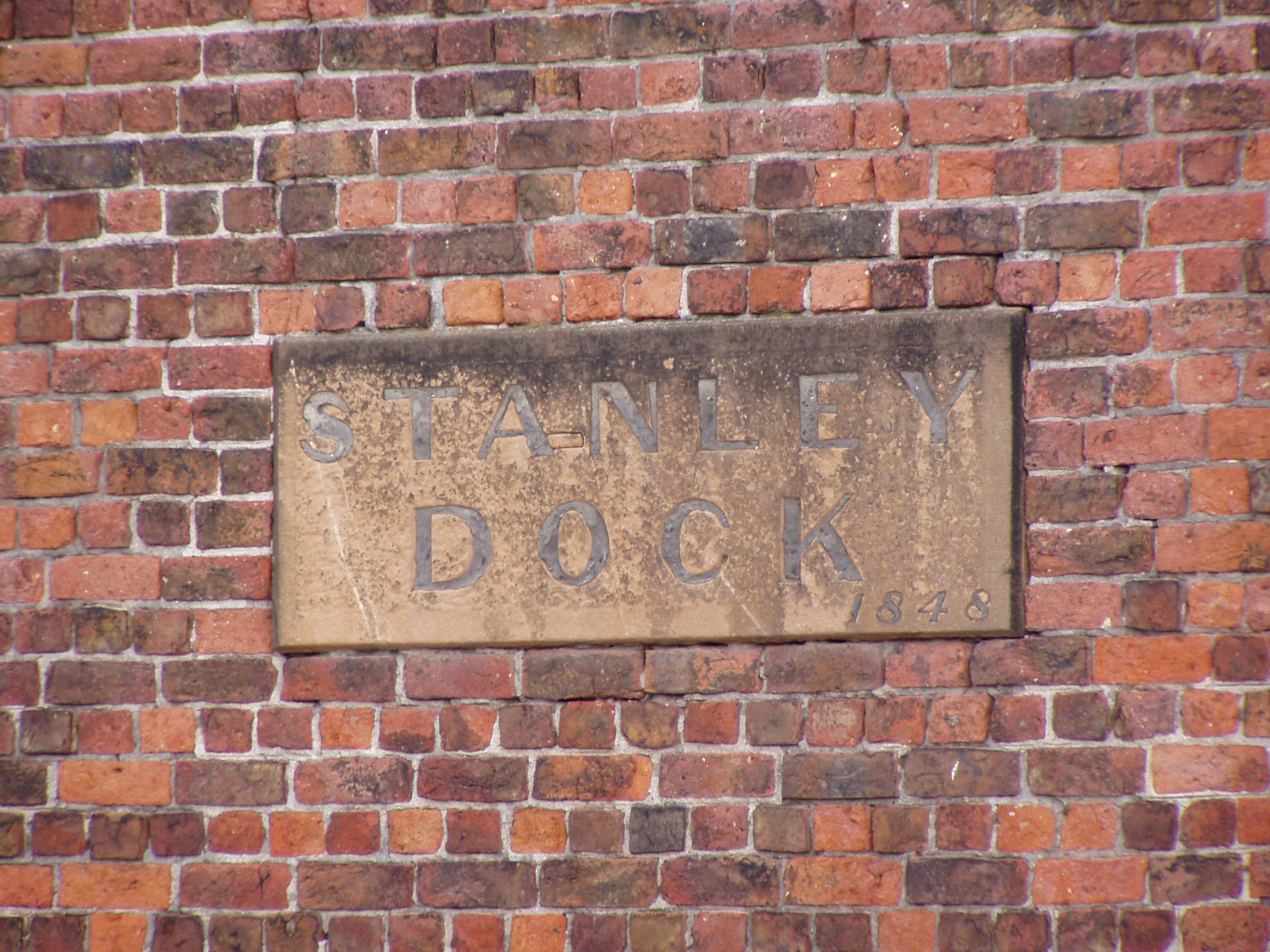

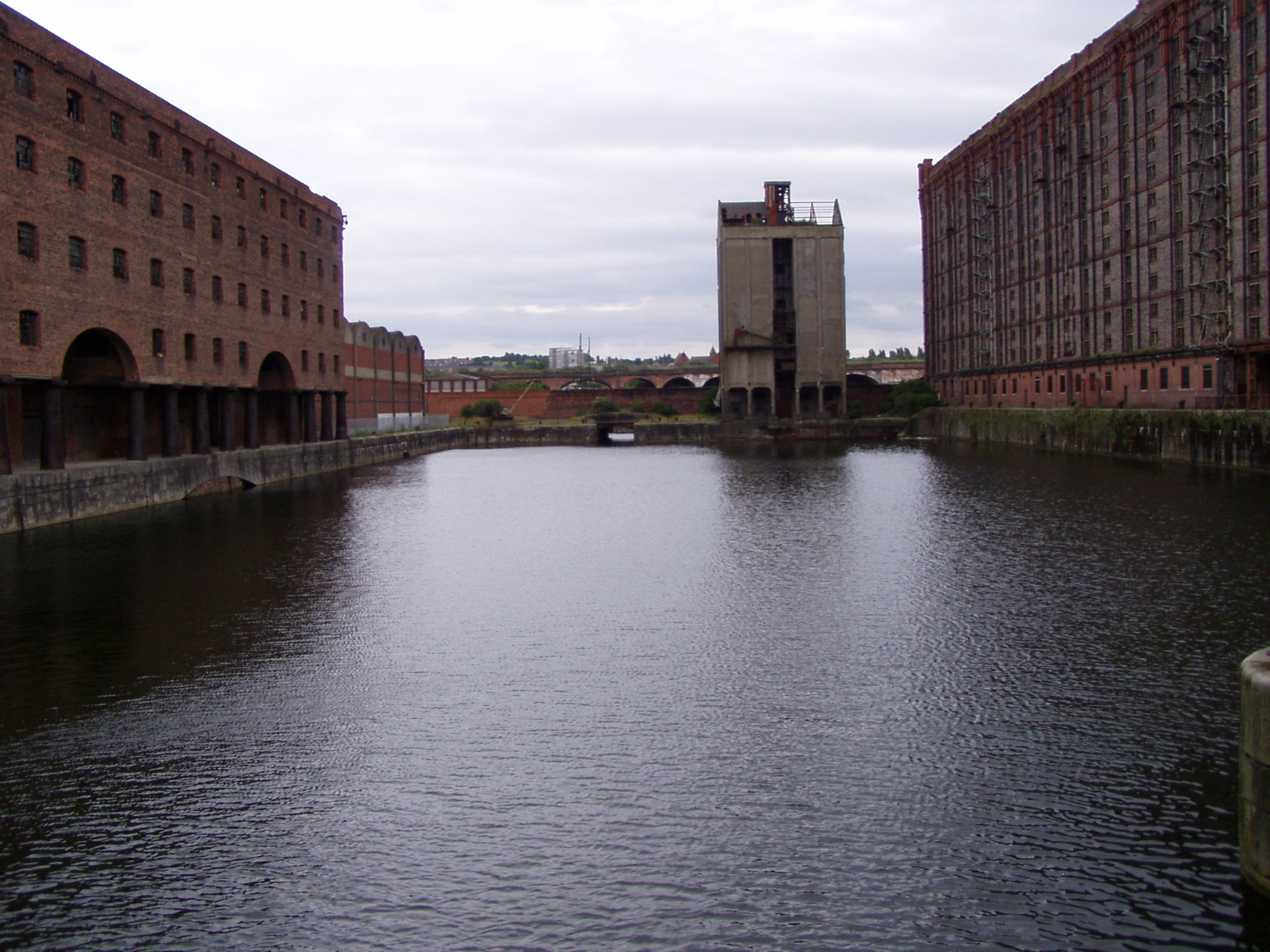

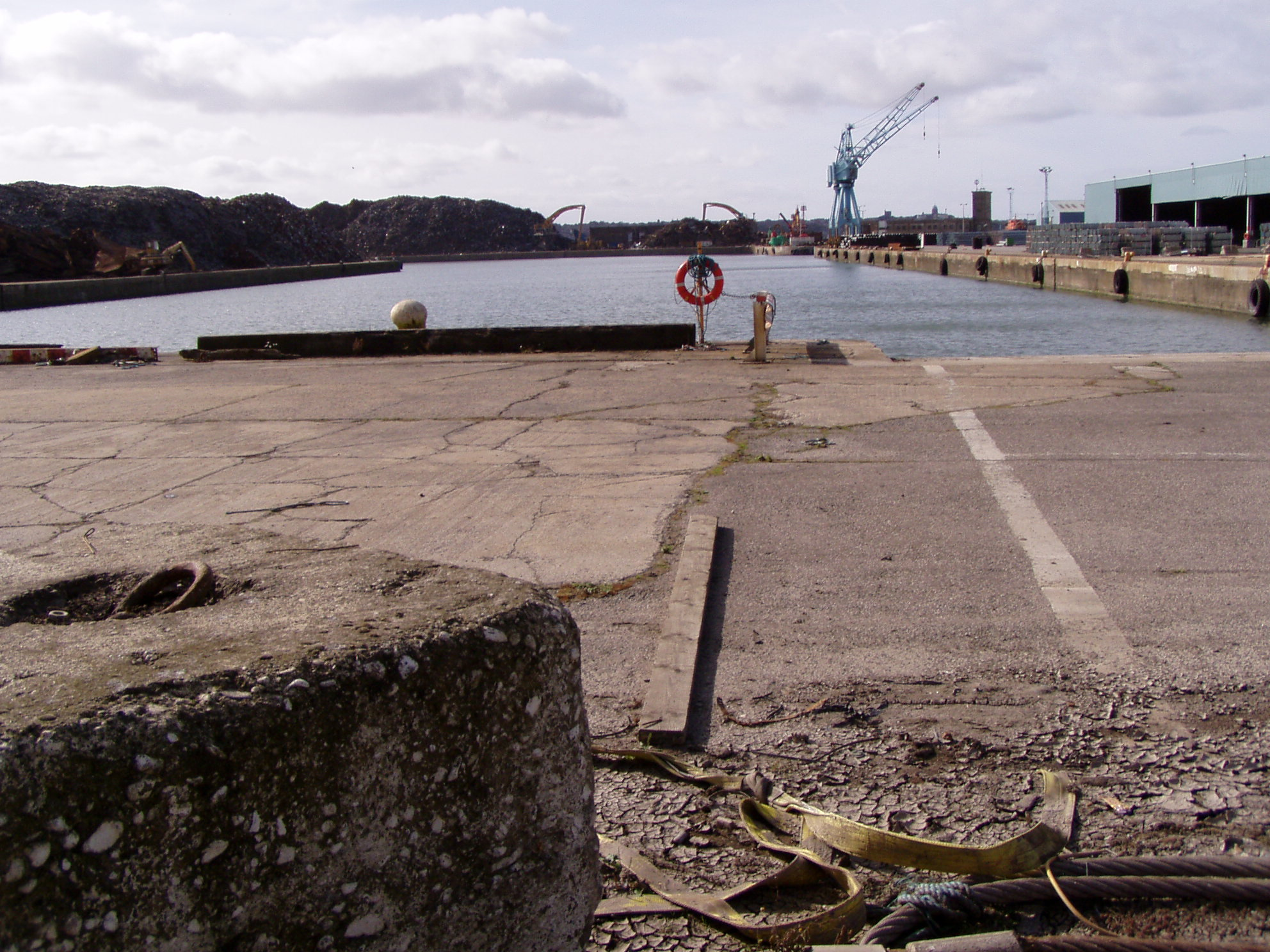

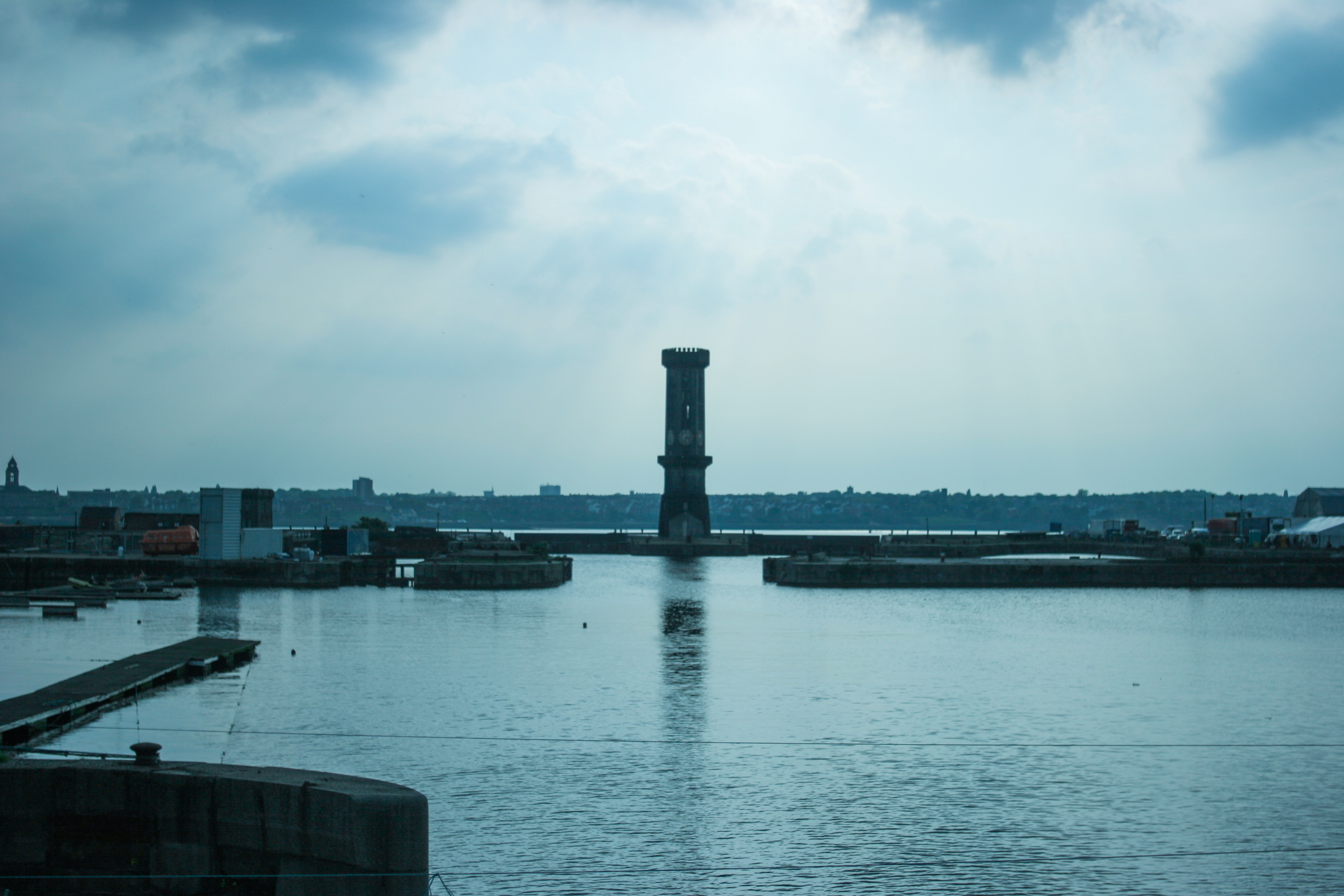

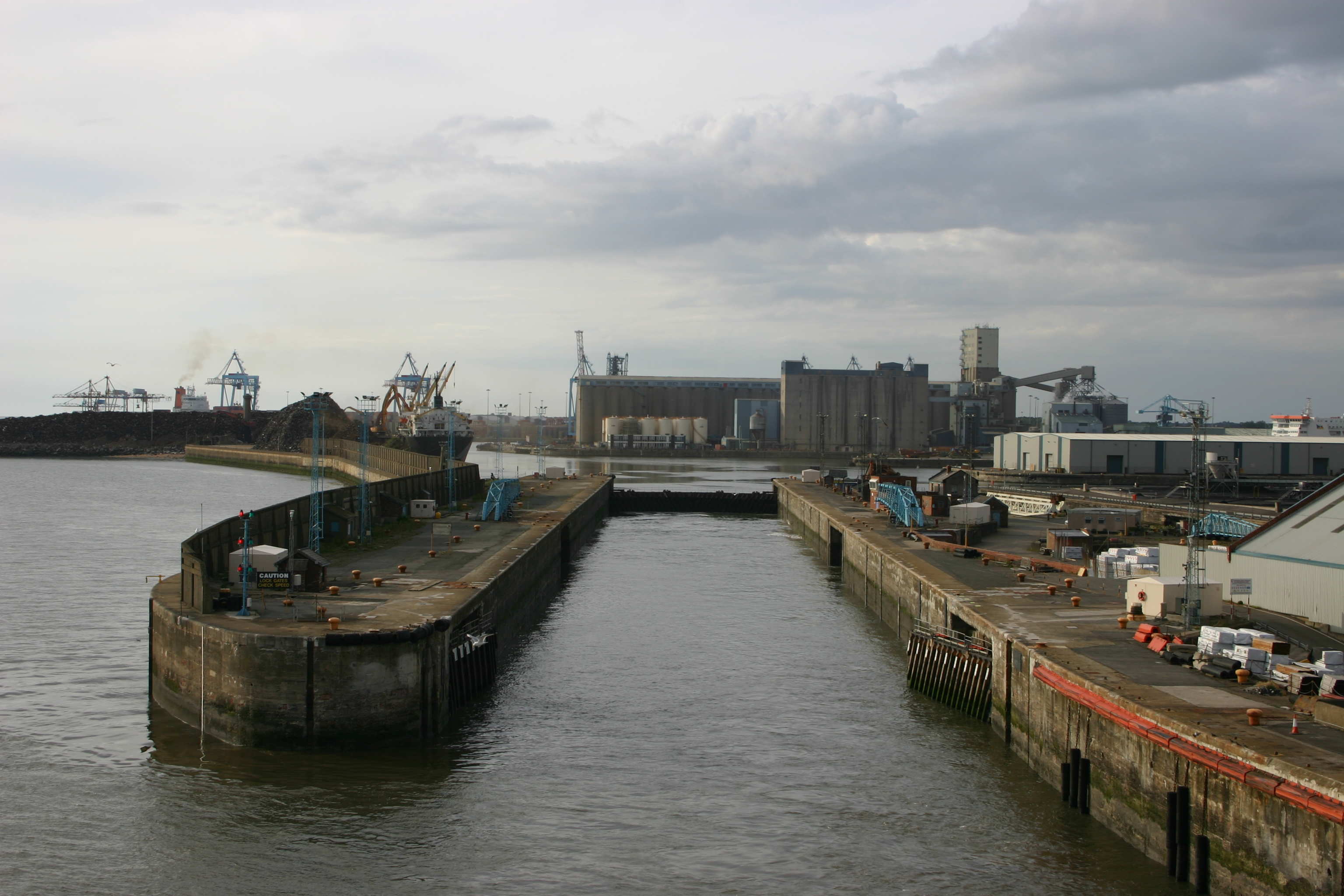

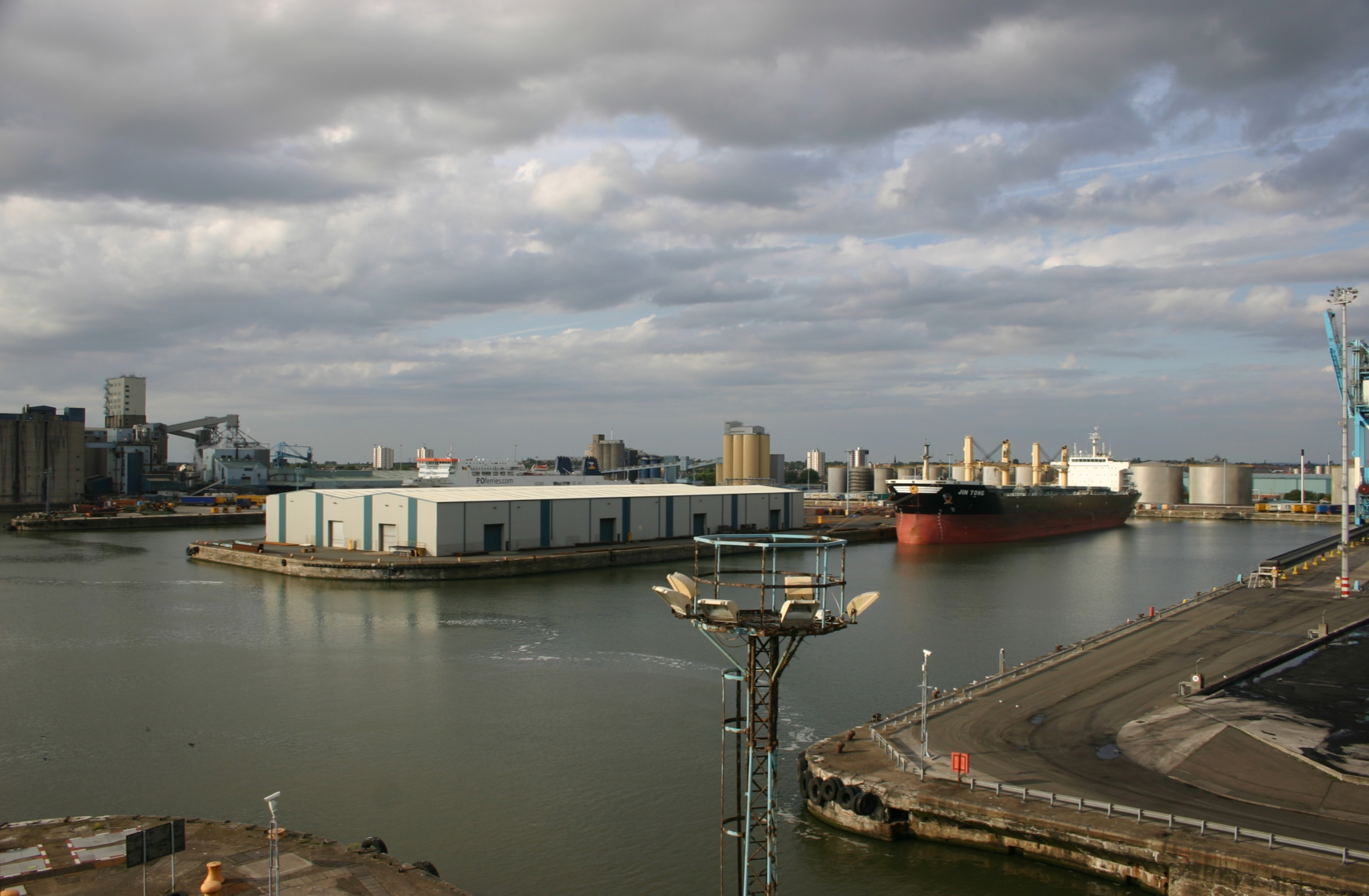

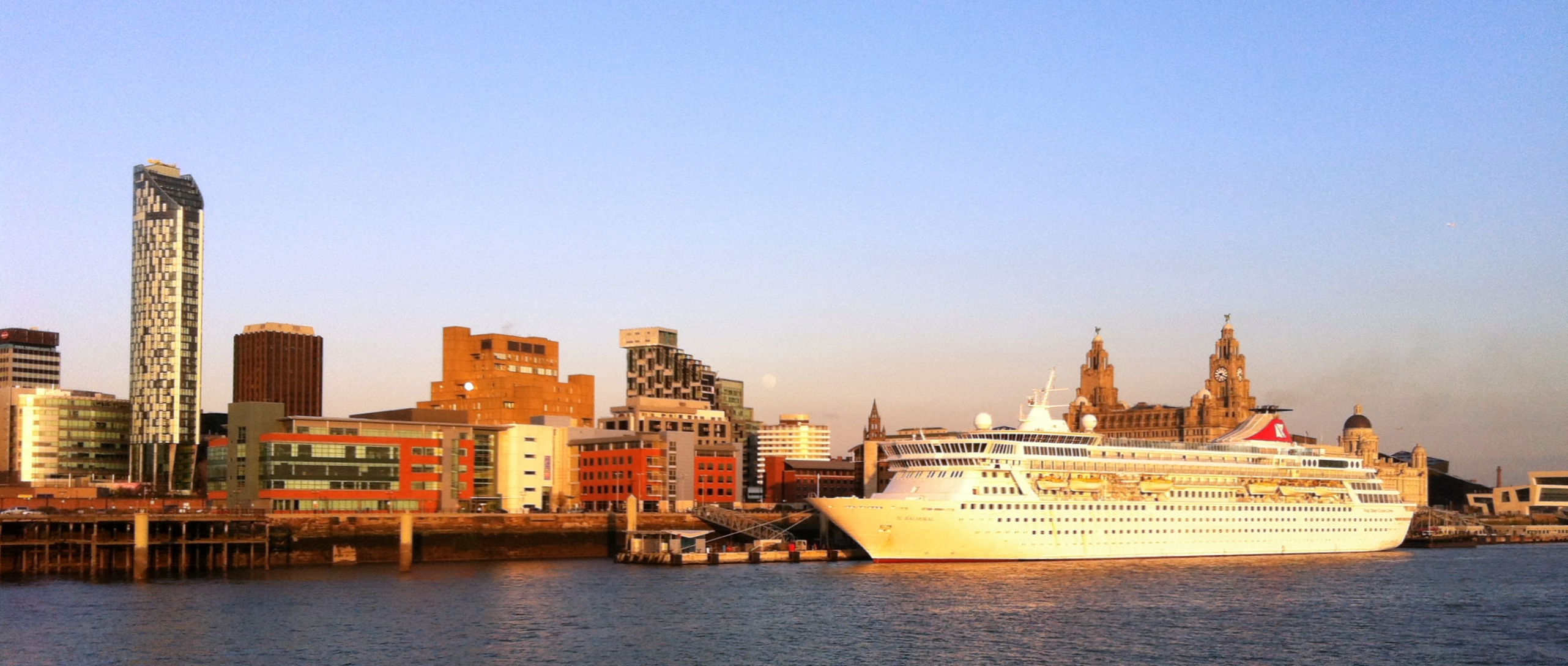

== See also ==
- Isle of Man Steam Packet Company
- List of Liverpool Docks
- Twelve Quays
- Port of Liverpool Building
- Architecture of Liverpool
- Liverpool slave trade
