= Princes Dock (disambiguation) =

Princes Dock may refer to:

- Prince's Dock, Liverpool, England
- Princes Dock railway station
- 1 Princes Dock a residential complex in Liverpool
- Prince's Half-Tide Dock in Liverpool, England

== See also ==
- Prince's Dock (formerly known as Junction Dock) in Kingston upon Hull, England
- Glasgow Science Centre / Pacific Quay, located on the site of Prince's Dock, Glasgow (also the site for the Glasgow Garden Festival)
