= Plot 3a Princes Dock =

General information
- Status: Never built
- Type: Mixed-use
- Location: Prince's Dock, Liverpool, England, United Kingdom

Height
- Height: 105 metres (344 ft)

Technical details
- Floor count: 34

Design and construction
- Architect: RMJM
- Developer: Peel Holdings

Plot 3a Princes Dock was a 34-storey mixed use skyscraper approved for construction alongside Prince's Dock at the waterfront of Liverpool, England. It was to stand alongside the likes of 1 Princes Dock and Alexandra Tower. Planning permission was granted for the building on two occasions (2007 and 2011); despite this, construction never commenced.

== Timeline ==
The initial design proposal for Plot 3a Princes Dock was released to the public in August 2006. The design differed slightly from the final vision; it was slightly taller at 112.5 metres (369 ft) and was to contain 183 apartments alongside a 135 bedroom hotel. Following concerns and criticism in early 2007, Plot 3a Princes Dock was reduced in height. Consultation between the developer, architect, CABE, English Heritage and Liverpool City Council lead to the building being shortened to a proposed height of 105 metres (344 ft). The number of hotel rooms were also decreased to around 150. The reason given for the alterations of the design proposal were that it would look too tall and out of place in comparison to the city's historic Three Graces. Despite this, the building was only reduced by three storeys.

Plot 3a Princes Dock was given approval in mid-2007. Afterwards, developers Peel Holdings concentrated their efforts on other aspects of the Liverpool Waters project instead of Plot 3a Princes Dock, nevertheless planning permission was again approved in February 2011 (since the original planning permission had lapsed in early 2010). Planning permission subsequently expired again in 2014.

In 2018, Peel Holdings submitted new plans for an entirely different building at Plot 3a, an office block to be just 6 storeys tall. In 2019, planning permission was granted for this new development. Meanwhile, a similar 34-storey scheme, The Lexington, ultimately began construction at the neighbouring Plot 4a in 2018.

== See also ==
- List of tallest buildings and structures in Liverpool
