= Liverpool Riverside railway station =

Former railway station in Liverpool, England

Liverpool Riverside
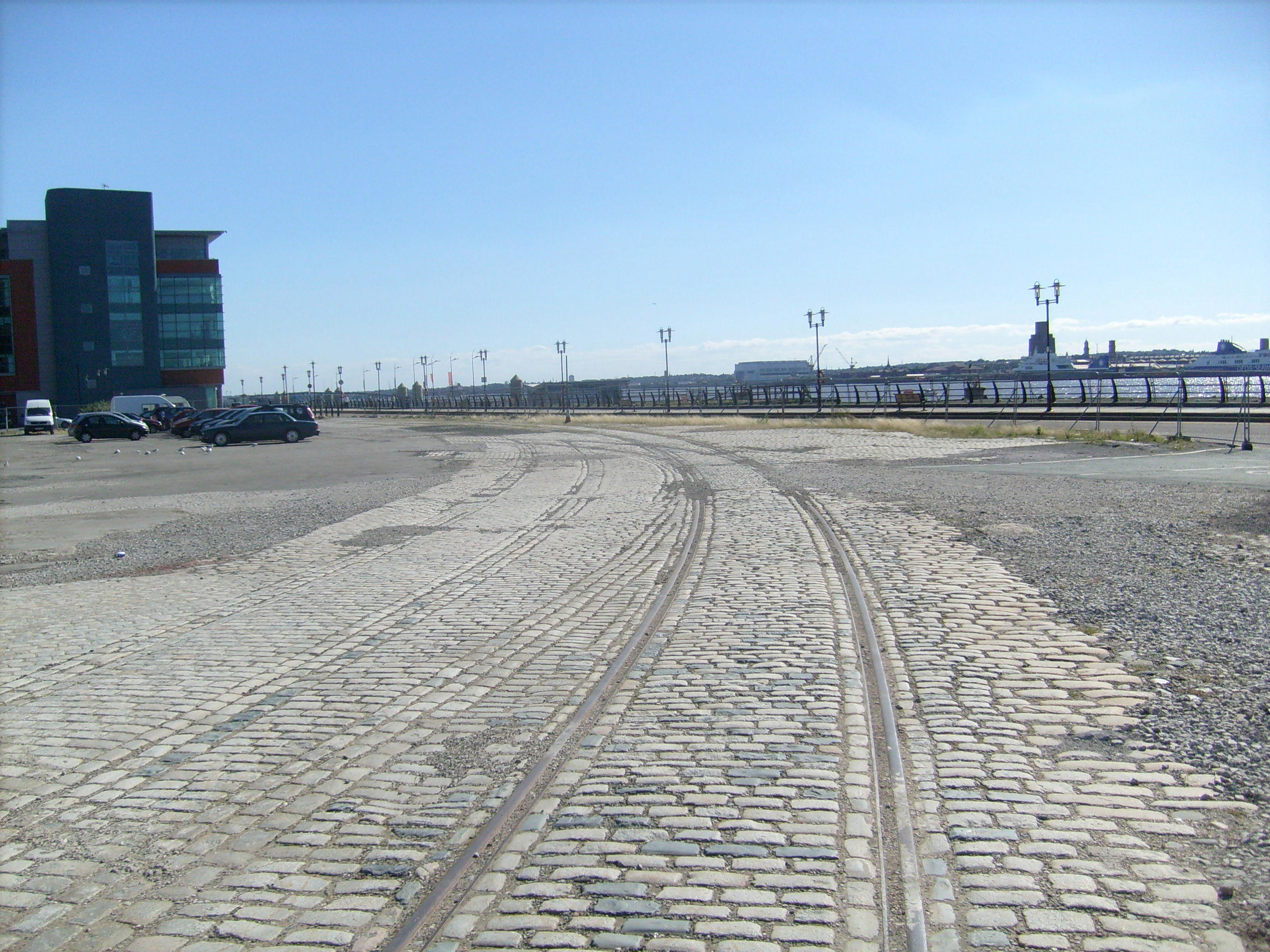
- Site of Liverpool Riverside Station in August 2010

General information
- Location: Liverpool, Liverpool; England
- Coordinates: 53.4075°N 2.9988°W
- Grid reference: SJ336906
- Platforms: 3

Other information
- Status: Disused

History
- Original company: Mersey Docks and Harbour Board
- Pre-grouping: Mersey Docks and Harbour Board
- Post-grouping: Mersey Docks and Harbour Board

Key dates
- 12 June 1895: Opened
- 25 February 1971: Closed
Location

Liverpool Riverside was a railway station owned by the Mersey Docks and Harbour Board and located at Liverpool's Pier Head ocean liner terminal.

== History ==
The station was specifically used for ship liner traffic, opening on 12 June 1895. It was accessed via the Victoria and Waterloo tunnels.

It had two main platforms of 795 feet (242 m) and 698 feet (213 m), with a centre release track between them, and a 560 feet (170 m) bay platform, all covered by a roof. Beyond the buffers were waiting rooms and an inspector's office. It was rebuilt in 1945 after bomb damage. On the opposite side of Princes Parade from the station were the Customs examination rooms and the floating Princes Landing Stage, where the ships berthed.

Due to weight restrictions on the line, it was worked by a pair of LNWR Webb Coal Tank locomotives which took trains from Edge Hill railway station until strengthening of the infrastructure around the docks area in 1950 allowed large mainline locomotives to travel through. To open the line for a train the signalman had to walk about 0.75 miles (1.21 km) fitting six Annett's keys into locks at the swing bridge and points. A pilot with a red flag walked a similar distance in front of each train that arrived and departed.

The station was closed when the Belfast Steamship Company's Ulster Queen hit the swing bridge at the entrance to Prince's Dock on 21 October 1949, reopening on 27 March 1950.

The station was heavily used during both World Wars, receiving troop trains from all over the United Kingdom and troops entering the country, however a decline in Atlantic liner traffic in the 1960s due to the growing popularity of air travel saw its use decline.

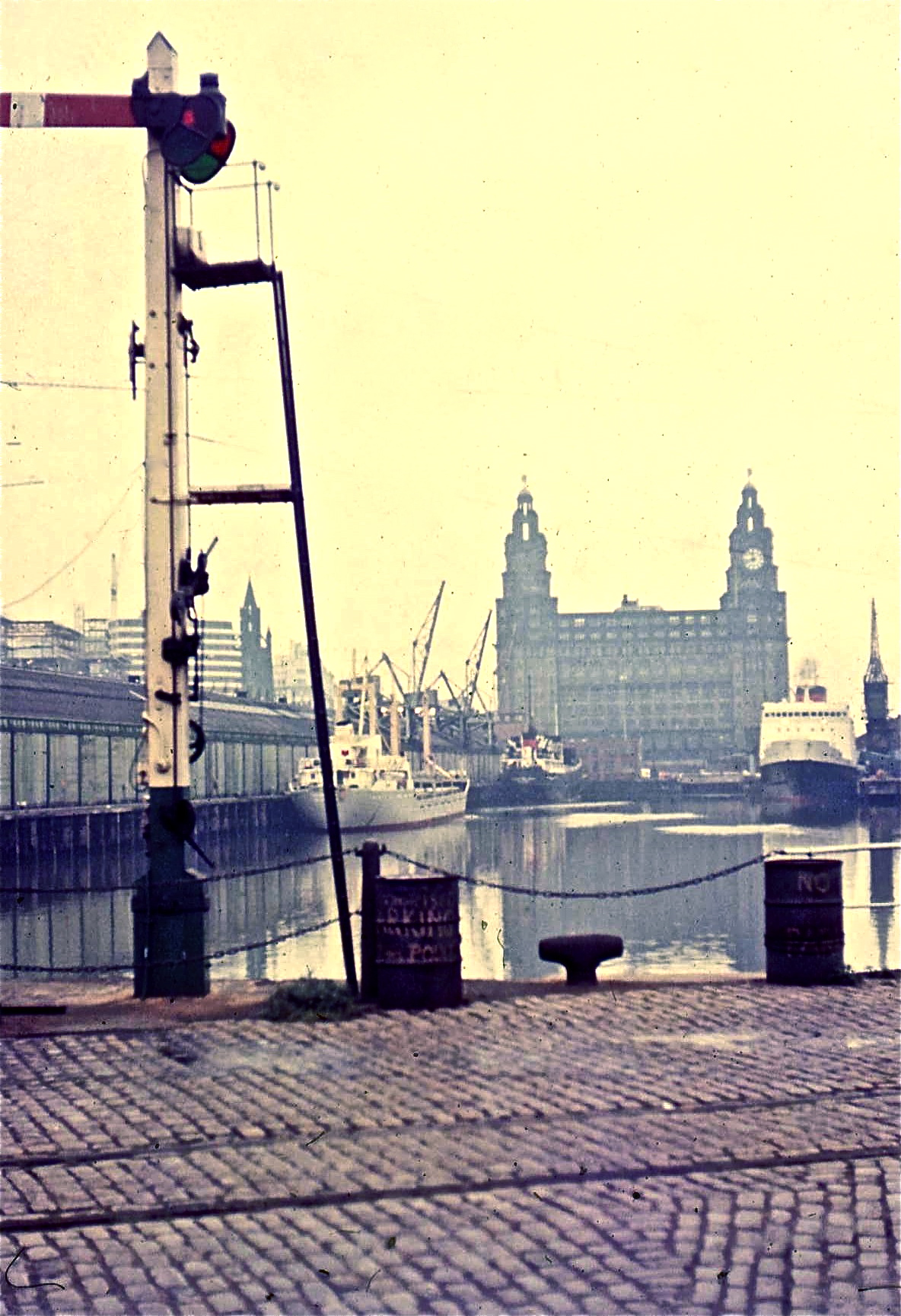
1972 view of branch-line with MV Ulster Queen and the Liver Building in the background.

On 20 September 1960, English Electric type 4 locomotives D211 and D212 were respectively named Mauretania and Aureol at the station.

The last train to use the station was a troop train carrying soldiers bound for Belfast on 25 February 1971. It was demolished in the 1990s.
