= Prince of Wales Dock =

Prince of Wales Dock may refer to:

- Prince of Wales Dock, Edinburgh
- Prince of Wales Dock, Swansea, part of Swansea Docks
- Prince of Wales Dock, Workington, Cumbria
- Prince of Wales Graving Dock (Southampton), now filled in

== See also ==
- Princes Dock (disambiguation)
