= Waterloo Goods railway station =

Former railway station in Liverpool, England

Waterloo Goods
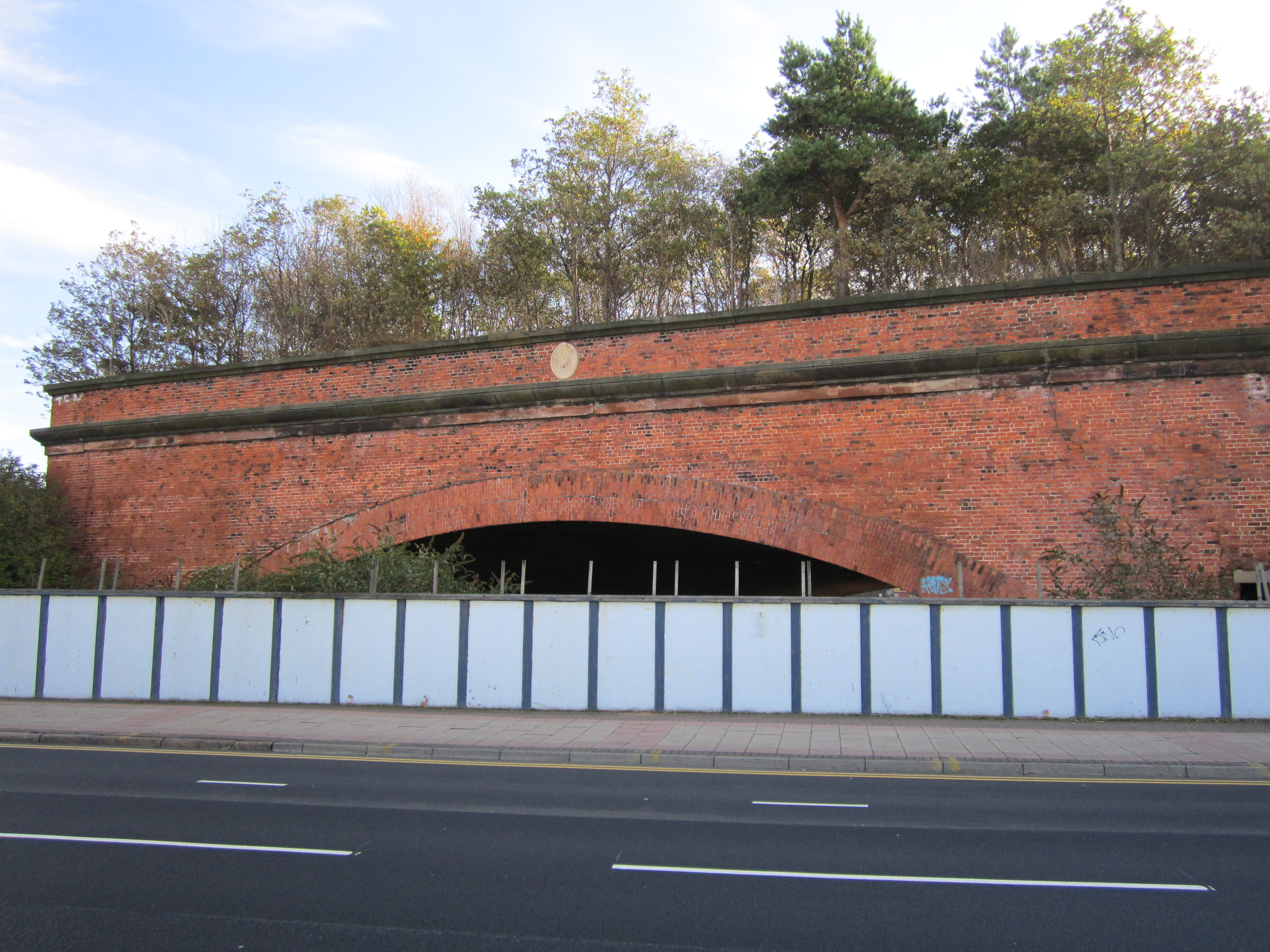

General information
- Location: Vauxhall, Liverpool; England
- Coordinates: 53.4154°N 2.998°W
- Grid reference: SJ337914

Other information
- Status: Disused

History
- Original company: London & North Western Railway

Key dates
- 1 August 1849: Opens
- 30 September 1963: Closed to goods traffic
- 6 September 1970: Station closes
Location

Waterloo Goods railway station was a station located on the Waterloo Branch, Liverpool. It opened in 1849 to serve the docks which were expanding to the north of the city.

== History ==
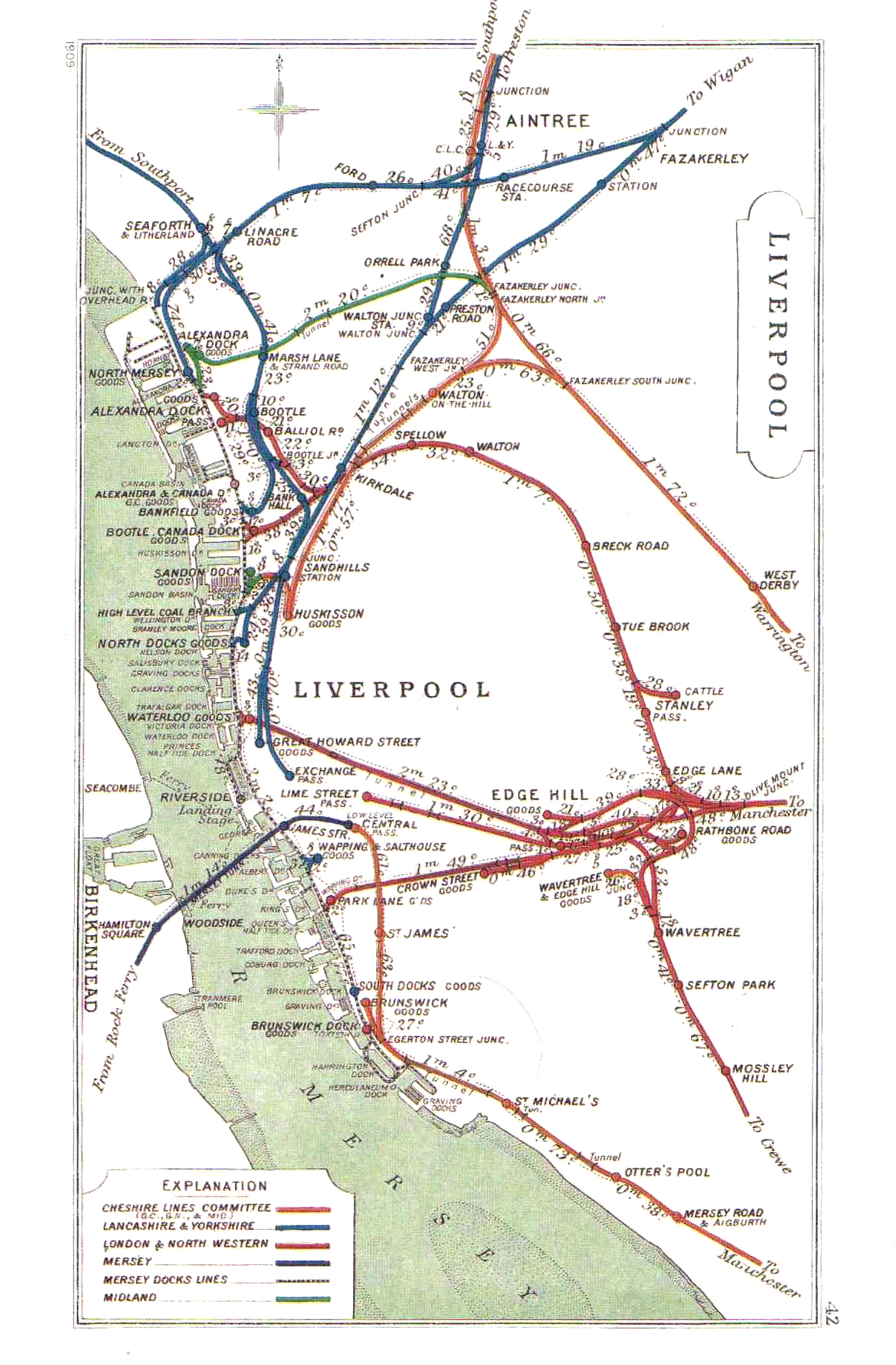
Liverpool RJD 42

To cater for the increased freight traffic from the docks, Liverpool & Manchester Railway succeeded in gaining an Act of Parliament in 1845 to build the Waterloo branch. Work finally began on the line in 1845, by which point the Liverpool & Manchester Railway had been absorbed by the London & North Western Railway. The line was accessed via the Victoria and Waterloo tunnels. The station itself was completed and opened in 1849.

During the Second World War, Liverpool and its docks were extensively targeted by German bombers and the station was hit. Despite being badly damaged, the station remained open though parts of its roofed sheds had to be demolished. By the 1950s the road network was taking more freight and use of the station began to decline leading to the station's eventual closure in 1963. The station was demolished in the early 1970s and is now the site of one of the ventilation shafts for the Kingsway Tunnel. Although the lines have been lifted the tunnels remain. In August 2016, the Great Howard Street bridge that spanned the lines was demolished to be replaced with a new one. This would allow the line to be brought back into use in the future to serve Liverpool Docks.
