= Waterloo Tunnel =

Disused railway tunnel under Liverpool, England

- Interactive map of Waterloo Tunnel

Overview
- Other name: Victoria Tunnel
- Location: Liverpool, Merseyside, England
- Coordinates: 53.4123°N 2.9899°W

Operation
- Constructed: 1849
- Opened: 1849
- Closed: 1972

The Waterloo Tunnel in Liverpool, England, is a former railway tunnel, 852 yd (779 m) long, which opened in 1849. Its western end was at 53.414829, -2.994385, underneath Pall Mall. From here the line continued under Great Howard Street to Waterloo Goods railway station, now the site of the Kingsway Tunnel Ventilation Shaft, after 1895 continuing beyond to the dock railway system and on to Liverpool Riverside at the Pier Head for direct connection to the passenger liners. The eastern end opens into a short (69 yd (63 m)) cutting, four tracks wide between Byrom Street and Fontenoy Street, which connects to the Victoria Tunnel, which emerges at Edge Hill station. It is effectively one long tunnel from Edge Hill to Liverpool Waterloo Dock with two names along its route. The tunnels were given two different names because initially trains in the Victoria Tunnel were cable hauled and in the Waterloo Tunnel locomotive hauled. Both tunnels closed on 19 November 1972.

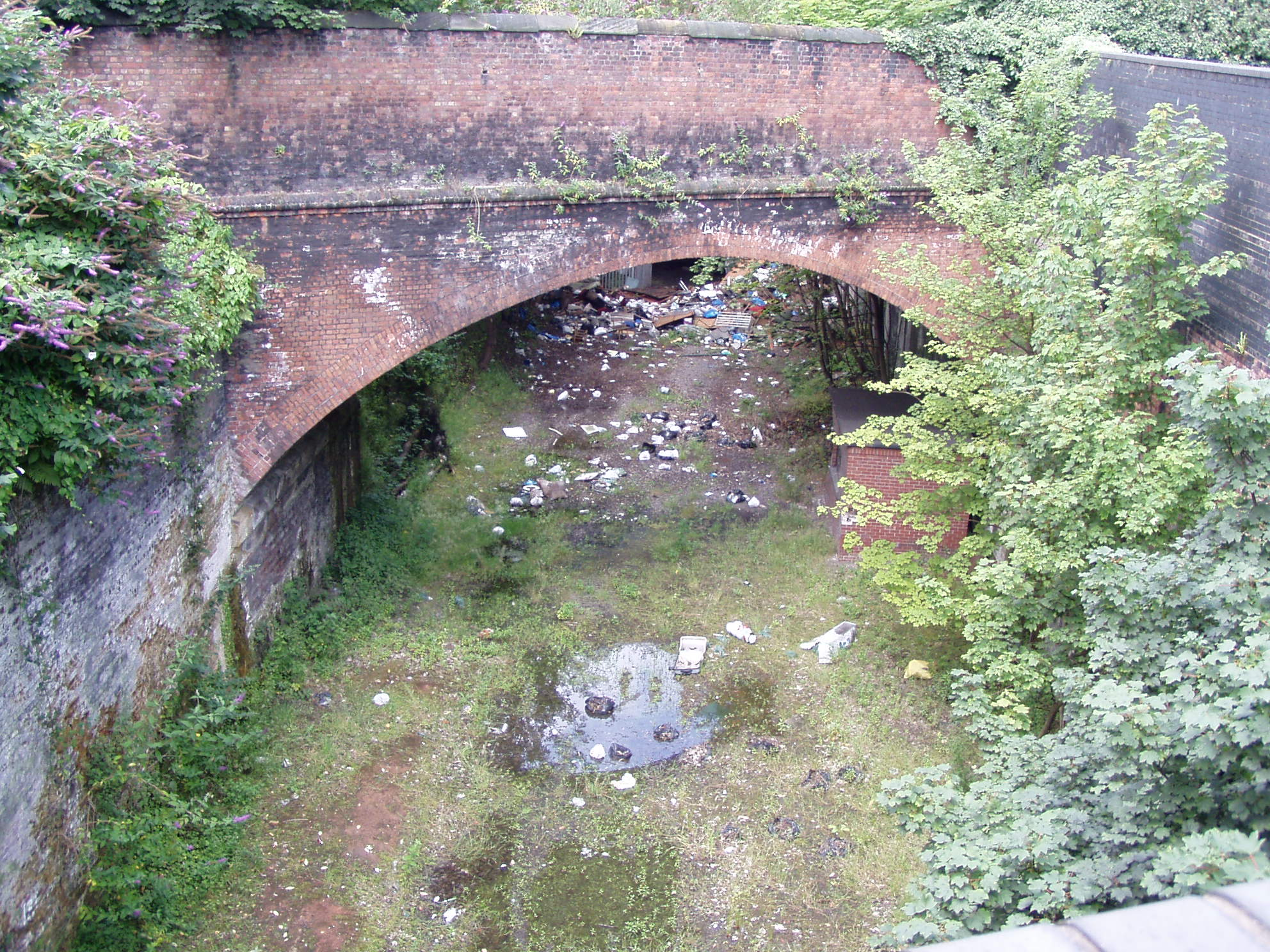
The Byrom Street Cutting at Fontenoy Street, looking toward Waterloo Tunnel

In May 2007 it was reported that chief executive of Merseytravel, Neil Scales, had prepared a report outlining the possibilities for reuse of the Victoria/Waterloo and Wapping tunnels. Merseytravel safeguard the tunnel for future use.

In 2016, work began on replacing the road bridge on Great Howard Street that crosses over the dock entrance to the tunnel. Whilst it would have been cheaper to remove the existing bridge and in fill the resulting gap, the Department for Transport insisted the bridge was replaced at a cost of £9.7 million in order to preserve the tunnel for future use.

== See also ==
- Victoria Tunnel (Liverpool)
