= Victoria Tunnel (Liverpool) =

Disused railway tunnel running under Liverpool, England

Coordinates: 53.402°N 2.946°W

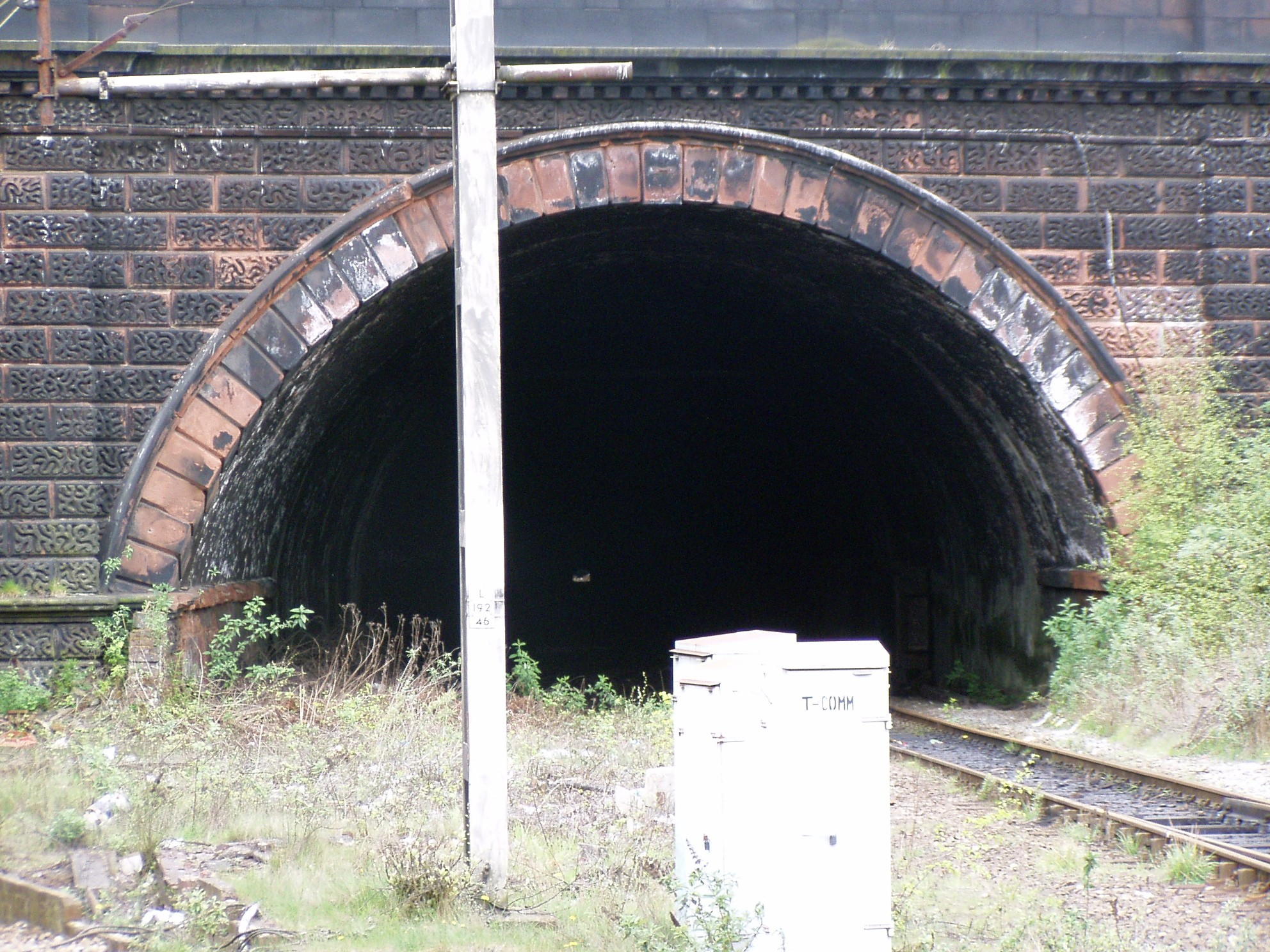
The Grade II listed Victoria Tunnel Portal at Edge Hill Station

The Victoria Tunnel in Liverpool, England is a 1.537 miles (2.474 km) long rail tunnel. Opened in 1849, its eastern portal is adjacent to Edge Hill station. The western portal opens into a short (69 yards or 63 metres) cutting, between Byrom Street and Fontenoy Street, the shorter Waterloo Tunnel exits the cutting terminating at Waterloo Dock. The Victoria and Waterloo tunnels are effectively one long tunnel connected by a ventilation cutting. The whole length is generally known as the Waterloo Tunnel.

== Constructing the tunnel ==
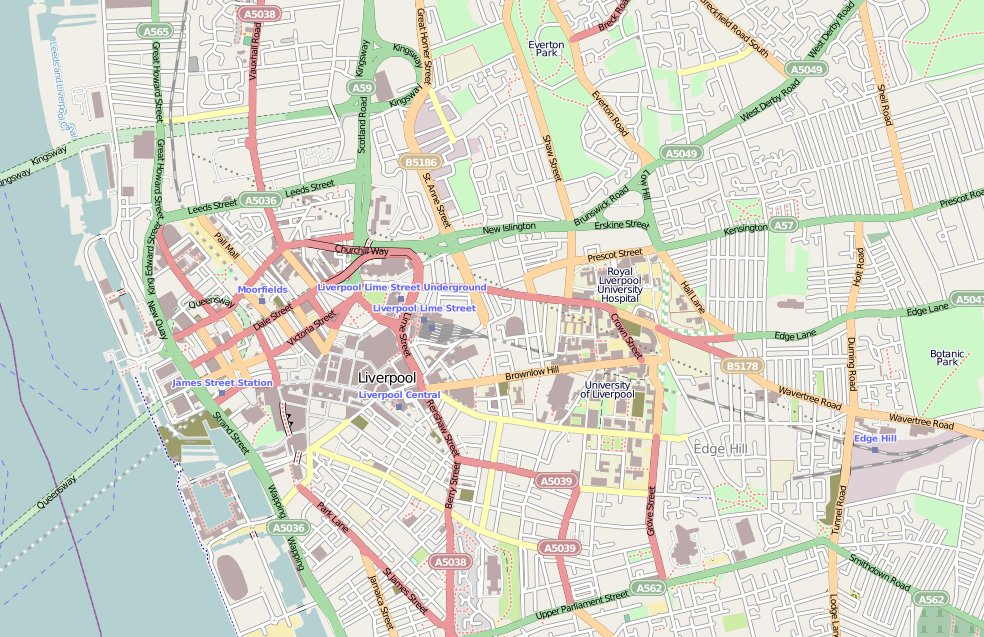
The Victoria Tunnel is the dotted line from Edge Hill in the east running north west to the docks.

The city of Liverpool is built on an escarpment. Edge Hill stands on the ridge to the east of the city. The escarpment falls down to the River Mersey. The Victoria Tunnel followed a western course downwards on a falling gradient of 1:57 to the river. The lowest point is at the Byrom Street cutting. The tunnel continues towards the Waterloo Dock with the much shorter Waterloo Tunnel. The tunnel rises upwards from this point with rising gradients of 1:513 for 251 yd (230 m), 1:139 for 400 yd (370 m) and finally 1:86 for 217 yd (198 m) to the western Waterloo Dock portal.

When cutting the tunnel, from Byrom Street eastwards and upwards to Edge Hill the work was difficult as care was needed not to disturb the buildings above due to the shallow depth of the tunnel. Ventilation is via five air shafts. Refuges were cut into both walls with two small huts cut into the down-side for storage space rest places for rail workers. Demolition of buildings between Byrom Street and Fontenoy Street was needed to open out a box cutting, of 69 yd (63 m) in length at Byrom Street, where two sidings were laid. Locomotive watering tank facilities were installed in the cutting along with gas lighting, allowing 24-hour operation. The work cutting the tunnel from the Byrom Street Cutting to Waterloo Dock good station resulted in houses subsiding forcing the residents to abandon their homes.

In August 1849 the first goods trains ran through the tunnel to Waterloo Goods railway station. Rail wagons were pulled by locomotive from Waterloo Dock down a gradient in the Waterloo Tunnel to the Byrom Street cutting. From the cutting the tunnel rose to Edge Hill. Rail wagons were pulled up the steep gradient from the Byrom Street cutting by a wire rope. The rope was the largest iron wire rope ever manufactured. A brick building housed a large static steam engine that wound the rope pulling the rail wagons up the tunnel.

At 26 ft (7.9 m) in width and 18 ft (5.5 m) in height, the tunnel could accommodate rail wagons 9 ft (2.7 m) wide and 13 ft 3 in (4.04 m) high. Electric wiring was installed through the tunnel operating bells, allowing men at the Byrom Street cutting to communicate with men at Edge Hill.

The Victoria tunnel’s east portal at Edge Hill features a rusticated red sandstone arch. Of architectural merit the portal stonework has been Grade II listed since June 1985.

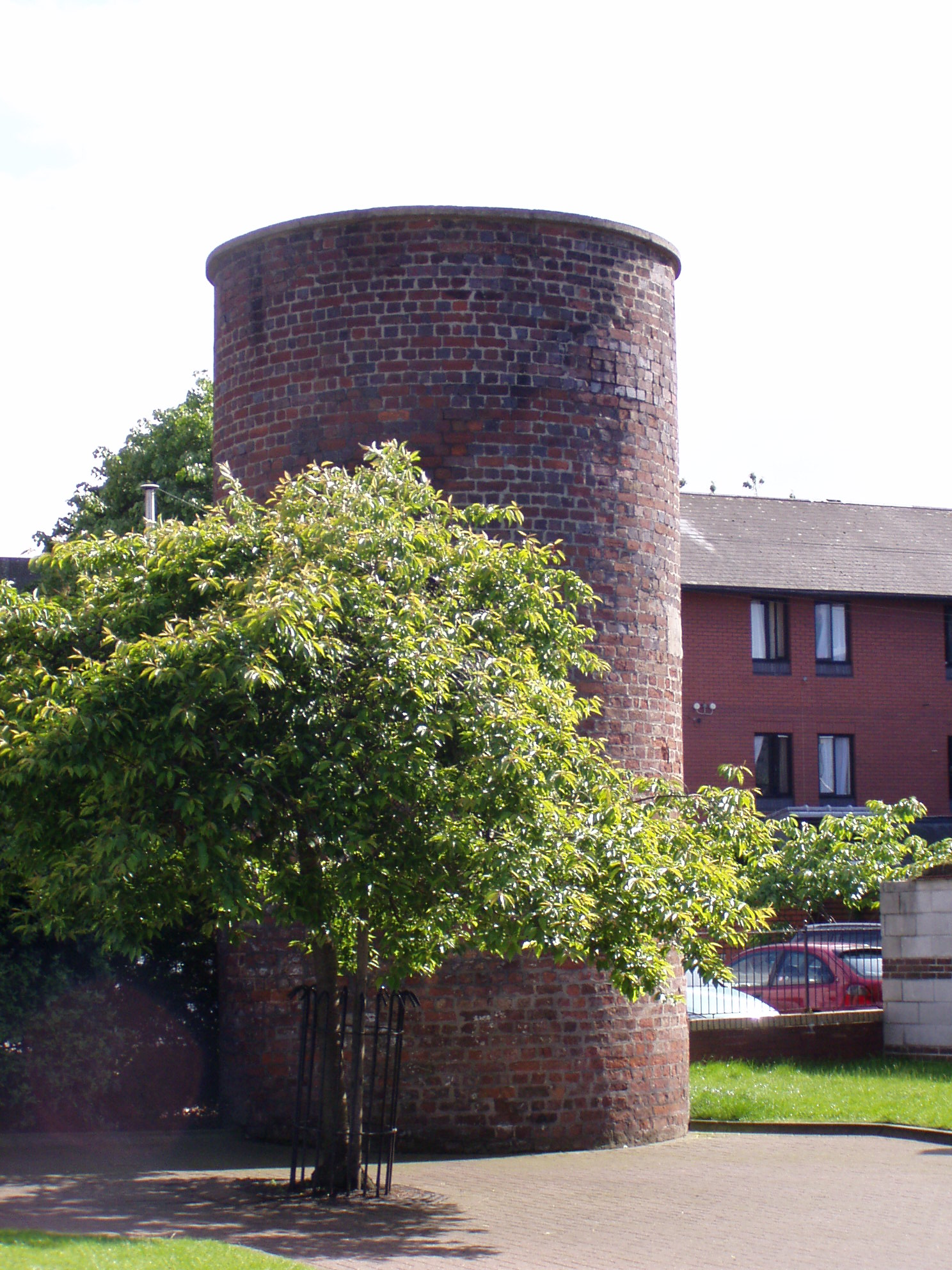
Ventilation shaft near Norton Street, Liverpool

== Use and closure ==
After 46 years of use, the wire rope severed on 16 February 1895. It was decided to abandon the old rope system as locomotives were now much more powerful and able to climb the whole tunnel incline without assistance. On 12 June 1895 passenger trains were introduced into the tunnel serving the now-demolished Riverside passenger liner terminal station at the Pier Head. From the tunnel portal at Waterloo Goods Station trains ran on the Mersey Docks & Harbour Board’s railway to the Riverside station.

Riverside liner terminus suffered a steep decline in trade during the 1960s as trans-Atlantic passenger trade was diverted to airliners. The last passenger service was in February 1971. The tunnel closed on 19 November 1972. A section of the up-line was retained as a 600 yd (550 m) head-shunt at Edge Hill. The structure of the tunnel is currently generally dry and in good condition. The tunnel is in the ownership of Network Rail, who maintain its structure.

== Reuse for Merseyrail ==
The eastern section of the Victoria Tunnel was considered as an addition to Merseyrail in 1975, to link the city centre from Liverpool Central underground station to the east of Liverpool. However, the tunnel was rejected in favour of the Wapping Tunnel. Spur works were built to enable a tunnelled connection to the Wapping Tunnel at Central station. However these short tunnels can be used to create tunnel links to either of the tunnels in the future. Budget cuts prevented further work.

In May 2007 it was reported that Merseytravel Chief Executive Neil Scales had prepared a report outlining the possibilities for reuse of the Wapping tunnel and Victoria tunnel with the latter to aid in redeveloping the north shore area of Liverpool. The western portal emerges near to the site of the proposed Liverpool Waters docklands redevelopment scheme. Merseytravel safeguards the tunnel for future use.

Another use was suggested in September 2015 by the mayor of Liverpool Joe Anderson, this was to provide access to a new station on the former site of Archbishop Blanch School

== See also ==
- Wapping Tunnel
- Waterloo Tunnel
