= Waterloo Dock, Liverpool =

Dock in Liverpool

Waterloo Dock
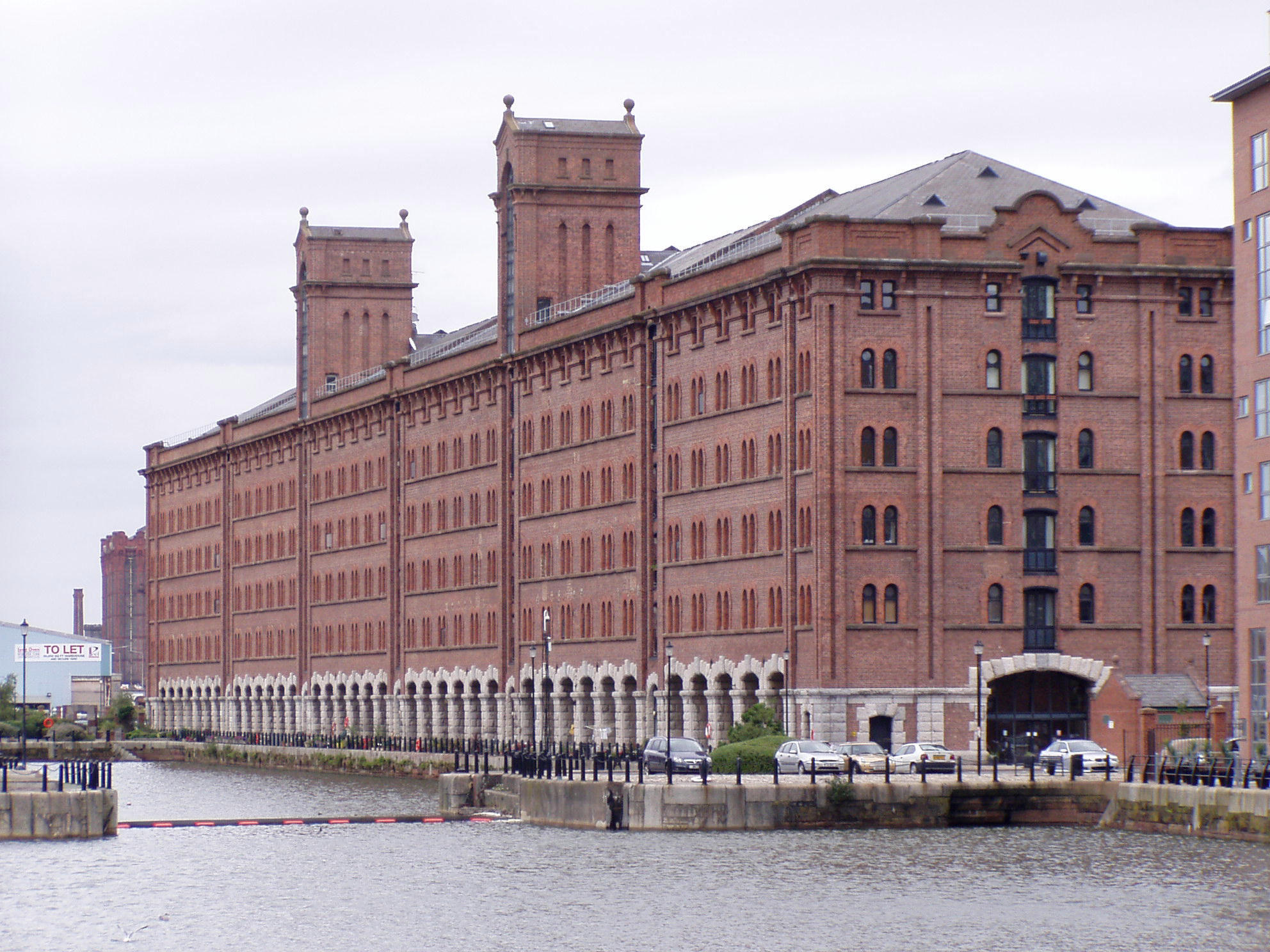
- West Waterloo dock and warehouse

Location
- Location: Vauxhall, Liverpool, Merseyside, United Kingdom
- Coordinates: 53.4140°N 3.0022°W
- OS grid: SJ335912

Details
- Owner: The Peel Group
- Operator: Mersey Docks and Harbour Company
- Opened: 1834
- Type: Wet dock
- Joins: Trafalgar Dock; Prince's Half-Tide Dock
- Area: 5 acres (2.0 ha), 3,056 sq yd (2,555 m^{2})
- Width at entrance: 45 ft (14 m)
- Quay length: 737 yd (674 m)

Waterloo Dock is a dock on the River Mersey, England, and part of the Port of Liverpool. It is situated in the northern dock system in Vauxhall and connected to Princes Half Tide Dock to the south. The site of Victoria Dock is located to the north.

== History ==
The dock was designed by Jesse Hartley and opened in 1834 as Waterloo Dock, named after the Battle of Waterloo.

In 1843 an observatory was built here for astronomical and meteorological observations and to provide accurate time for ships' chronometers.

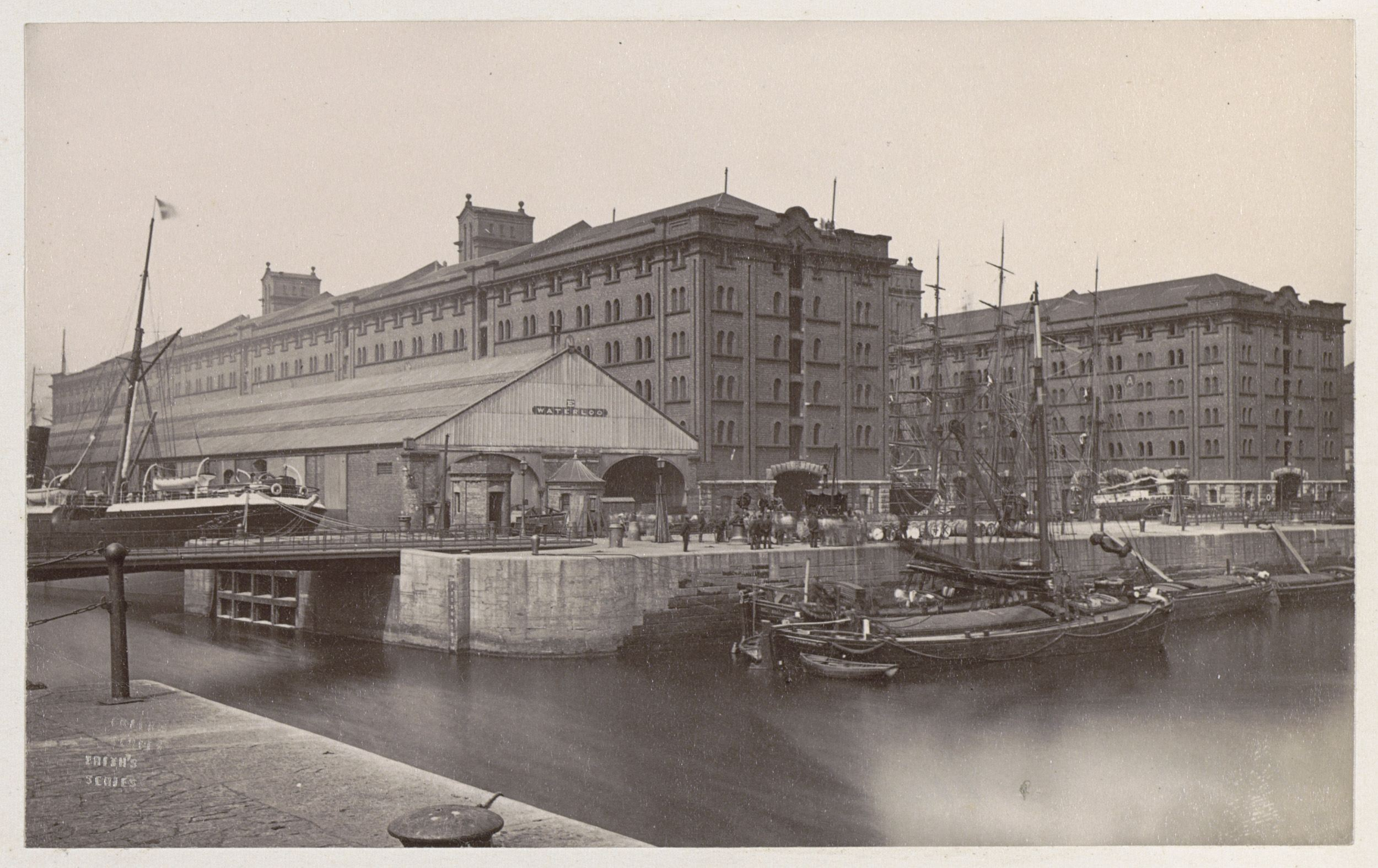
Waterloo warehouses and dock, late 19th century

In 1866, when the dock was redeveloped, the observatory was relocated to Bidston Hill on the Wirral Peninsula.

In 1868, Waterloo Dock was split in two separate basins; East Waterloo Dock and West Waterloo Dock.

Initially planned eleven years earlier, the lock entrance from the Mersey was finally opened in 1949. Construction was delayed due to the Second World War.

The dock closed to shipping in 1988. The entrance channel from the river and part of the dock has since been filled.

In 2007, work began on a £20 million extension of the Leeds and Liverpool Canal, providing a further 1.4 mi (2.3 km) of navigable waterway and encompassing Princes Half Tide Dock. A new 6.5 m (21 ft)-wide channel from Trafalgar Dock to the northern end of West Waterloo Dock will be excavated as part of the canal route.

The extensive Waterloo Warehouse has since been converted into residential apartments.
