= Prince's Dock, Liverpool =

Dock on the River Mersey, England

Prince's Dock
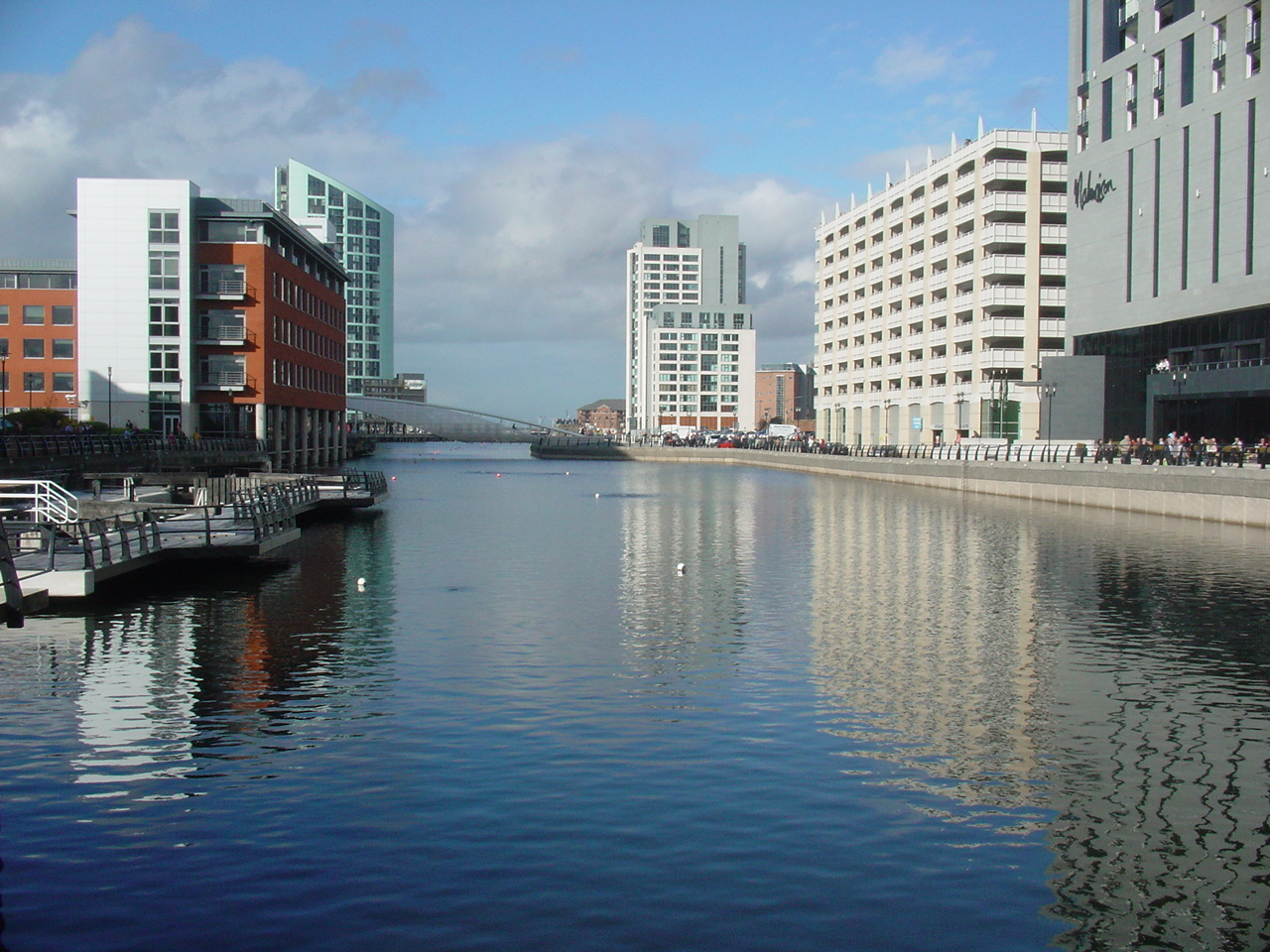
- Prince's Dock, Liverpool Waterfront

Location
- Location: Liverpool, United Kingdom
- Coordinates: 53°24′32″N 2°59′56″W
- OS grid: SJ336908

Details
- Owner: The Peel Group
- Operator: Mersey Docks and Harbour Company
- Opened: 1821
- Type: Wet dock
- Joins: Prince's Half-Tide Dock; Liverpool Canal Link to Canning Dock
- Area: 11 acres (4.5 ha), 3,889 sq yd (3,252 m^{2})
- Width at entrance: 45 ft (14 m)
- Quay length: 1,613 yd (1,475 m)

Prince's Dock (Note: Although many texts give the name without an apostrophe as Princes Dock, this is an incorrect plural form. The dock is named for one prince; the Prince Regent, only.) is a dock on the River Mersey, England, and part of the Port of Liverpool. It is the most southerly of the docks situated in the northern part of the Liverpool dock system, connected to Prince's Half-Tide Dock to the north. The dock is now in the buffer zone to one of Liverpool's World Heritage Sites.

== History ==
Initially, William Jessop and John Rennie were consulted about the plans for the dock. The dock was built by John Foster, with construction starting around 1810. During the construction, Foster ordered many times more stone than was needed. Allegedly, Foster diverted it to his family's building company. He resigned when this was discovered.

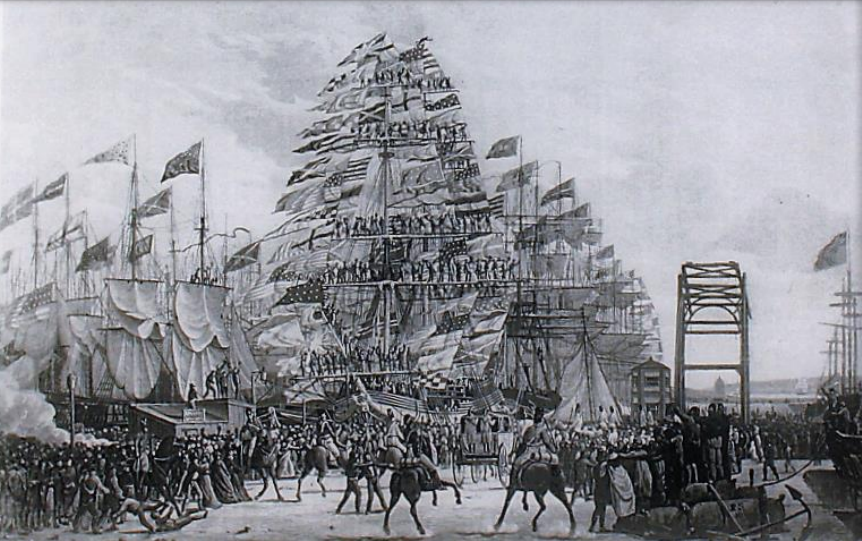
Opening of the Prince's Dock, Liverpool, on Coronation Day, 1821.

The dock was named for the Prince Regent. Still unfinished, it opened on the day of the Prince Regent's coronation as George IV on 19 July 1821. Access to the southern half of the dock system was via George's Basin, George's Dock and into Canning Dock.

In 1865, the Mimosa set sail from Liverpool, containing 153 Welsh settlers destined for Patagonia. It is currently thought that around 50,000 people in Patagonia today have Welsh heritage from the group of 153 settlers. A monument to the settlers was unveiled at Prince's Dock in 2015.

In 1874 George's Basin was filled, and in 1899 George's Dock was filled and the site used to create what is now the Pier Head.

On 12 June 1895 Liverpool Riverside Station was opened, situated between Prince's Dock and the River Mersey.

In 1968 B&I Line (operator of the Liverpool - Dublin service) commenced a new car ferry service from Carriers' Dock further downriver. A passenger only service continued to use Prince's Dock until 1969.

Ferry services from Prince's Dock finally ended in November 1981 when P&O Ferries closed their Liverpool - Belfast overnight service. The dock subsequently closed to shipping and was partly filled.

== Redevelopment ==
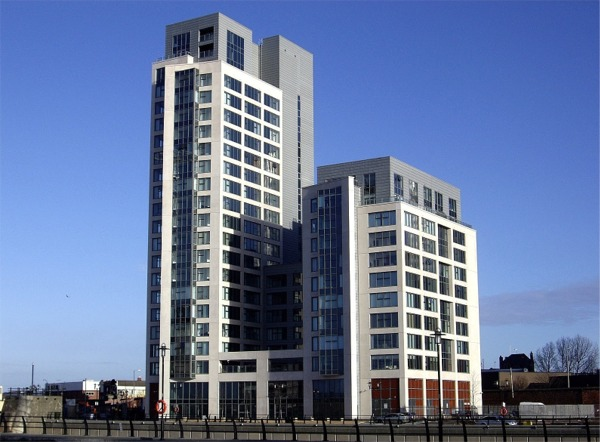
1 Princes Dock, one of the tallest buildings on the dockside

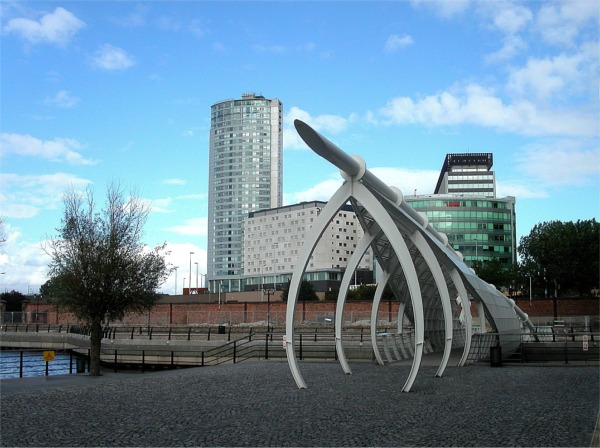
The footbridge of 2001 over Prince's Dock, Liverpool

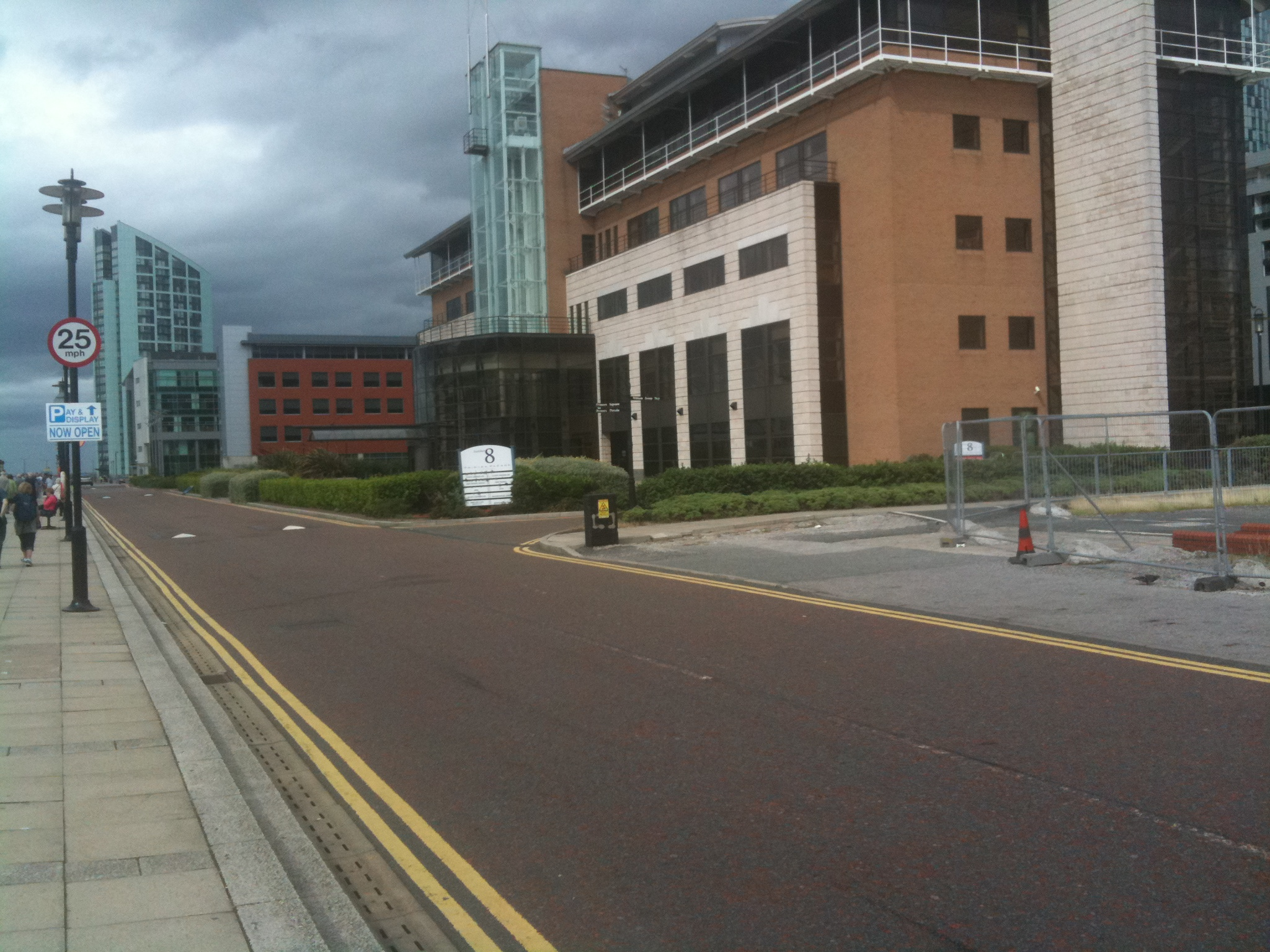
Office blocks on Princes Parade

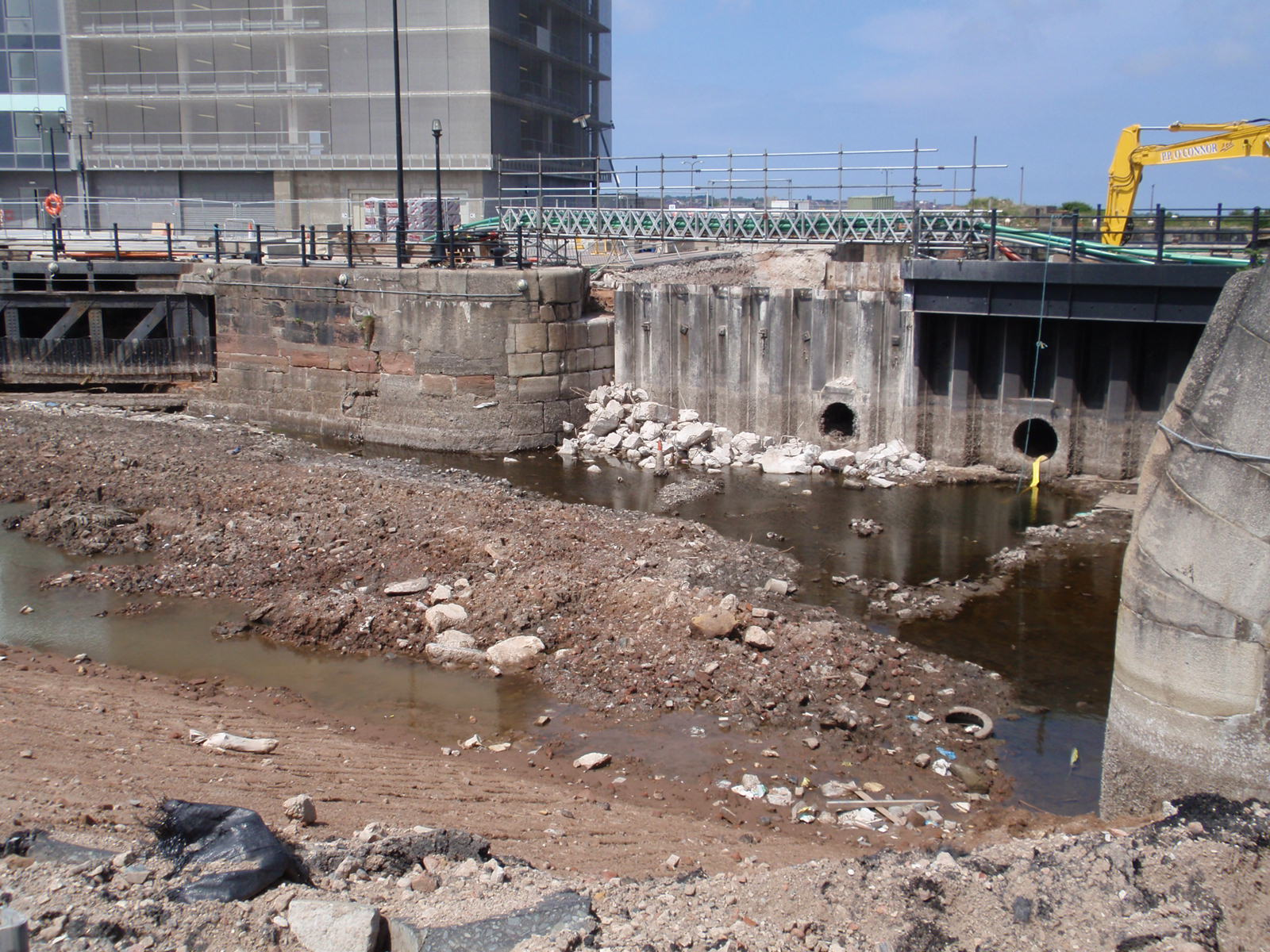
North end of Prince's Dock, 7 June 2008, cut off from the rest of the dock by a new road embankment and being landfilled

Commercial redevelopment began when the dock was passed to the Merseyside Development Corporation in 1988. Much of Prince's Dock's wharfage and warehouse space has been replaced by:

- Three blocks of office accommodation along the river front.
- The £24 million Malmaison 128-room hotel. It opened in 2007 and is its owning company's first ever 'new build'. It stands alongside the existing Crowne Plaza hotel.
- Three blocks of flats.

The dock was partially filled in to inland canal boat depths precluding deep water vessels. The dock has been divided into two sections spanned by a pedestrian bridge that was designed by the Liverpool John Moores University Centre for Architectural Research and Consultancy Unit (CARCU).

By March 2009 work was completed on a £22 million extension of the Leeds and Liverpool Canal, providing a further 1.4 miles of navigable waterway. A new lock and fixed bridge was built at the northern end of Prince's Dock. At the south end of the dock, a new canal tunnel was constructed which leads to the Pier Head. The tunnel is routed beneath St. Nicholas Place and the access road for the new cruise liner facility. From Prince's Dock, the extension passes the Pier Head and terminates at Canning Dock.

In 2007, planning permission was secured for the £130million New World Square. This was to have incorporated an eight-storey, five-star hotel, 385 apartments and space for shops and restaurants. However, planning permission for this development expired in 2010.

In 2016, planning permission was granted for the 34-storey Lexington Liverpool.

== Liverpool Cruise Terminal ==
Liverpool Cruise Terminal opened in 2007. As part of their plans to increase the number of visitors to Liverpool, the city council unveiled plans in September 2017 for a new cruise terminal that would be situated on the banks of the Mersey at Prince's Dock, where the wooden landing currently stage is. The plans would allow ships carrying up to 3,600 passengers to dock in Liverpool with the facilities including dedicated passport control and a cafe. It is hoped that a multi-storey car park and hotel will be built at Prince's Dock as part of the work.

== Cultural references ==
Prince's Dock is mentioned in the novel Redburn, His First Voyage by Herman Melville (1849):

"In magnitude, cost and durability the docks of Liverpool surpass all others in the world... for miles you may walk along that riverside, passing dock after dock, like a chain of immense fortresses. Prince's Dock, of comparatively recent construction, is perhaps the largest of all and is well known to American sailors from the fact that it is mostly frequented by the American shipping."

It is also mentioned in The English at the North Pole, the first part of Jules Verne novel The Adventures of Captain Hatteras (1864).

== See also ==
- Liverpool Canal Link
- Plot 3a Princes Dock
- Alexandra Tower
- 1 Princes Dock
- Princes Dock railway station
