= Prince's Half-Tide Dock =

Dock on the River Mersey in Liverpool, England

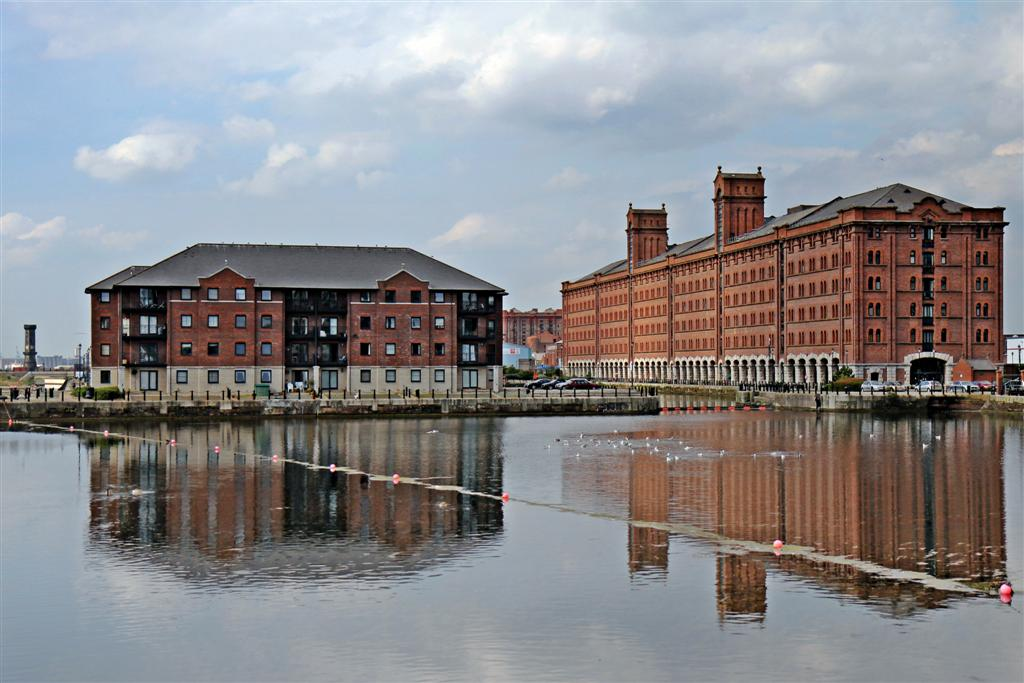
- Prince's Half-Tide Dock and dockside apartments

Location
- Location: Vauxhall, Liverpool, Merseyside, United Kingdom
- Coordinates: 53.4122°N 3.0007°W
- OS grid: SJ335910

Details
- Owner: The Peel Group
- Operator: Mersey Docks and Harbour Company
- Opened: 1810
- Type: Half tide dock (as built); Wet dock (current)
- Joins: Waterloo Dock; Prince's Dock

Prince's Half-Tide Dock on the River Mersey, England, is a half tide dock and part of the Port of Liverpool. It is situated in the northern dock system in Vauxhall, connected to East Waterloo Dock and West Waterloo Dock to the north and Prince's Dock to the south.

== History ==
The dock opened in 1810 and consisted of a lock entrance from the Mersey. This passage has since been closed off. The dock was rebuilt in 1868 by George Fosbery Lyster.

In 2007, work began on a £20 million extension of the Leeds and Liverpool Canal, providing a further 1.4 mi (2.3 km) of navigable waterway and encompassing Prince's Half-Tide Dock. A new lock, and fixed bridge, was built at the entrance to the adjoining Prince's Dock. The dock was partly filled in to reduce its depth.

== Isle of Man ferry terminal ==
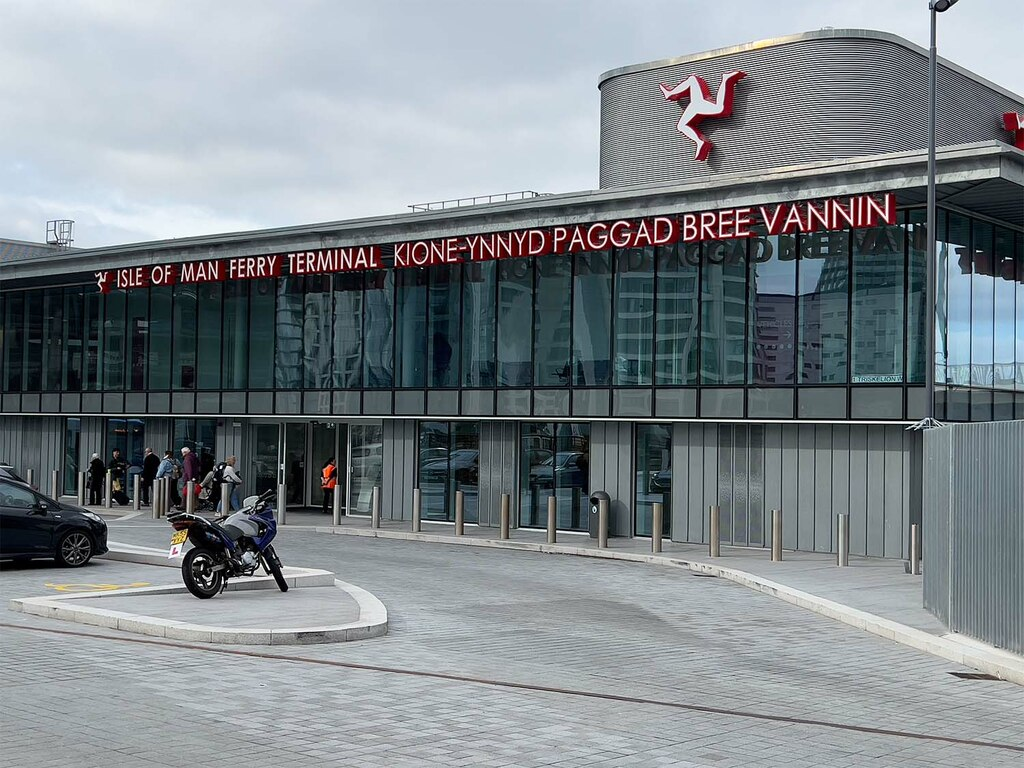
The Isle of Man Ferry Terminal

The Isle of man ferry terminal opened in 2024.

== Future ==
The area surrounding Prince's Half-Tide Dock forms part of the proposed multi-billion pound Liverpool Waters development; a series of towers is planned to be built around the dock.

Prince's Half-Tide Dock is the location of the new £3.5 million Isle of Man Steam Packet Company ferry terminal, which, in 2024, replaced the existing facility at Pier Head, which is "nearing the end of its operational life" according to the report placed before Tynwald (the Isle of Man parliament). The proposals were discussed before Tynwald on 19 July 2016.
