= Liverpool Cruise Terminal =

Passenger facility on the River Mersey

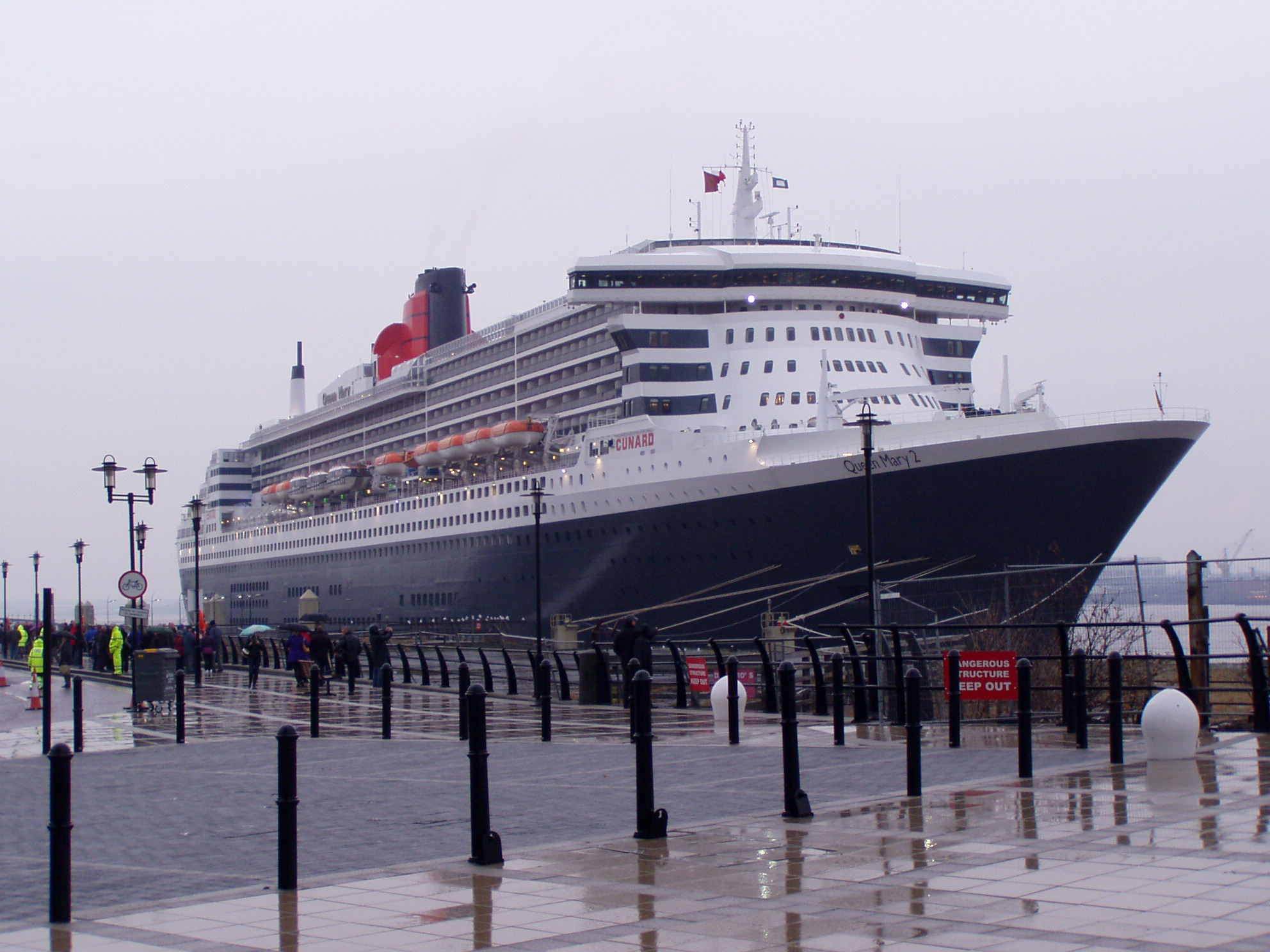
- Queen Mary 2 at Liverpool Cruise Terminal

General information
- Location: Prince's Dock, Liverpool city centre United Kingdom
- Coordinates: 53.4073°N 3.0001°W
- Owner: Peel Ports Group (Mersey Docks and Harbour Company)
- Operator: Global Ports Holding

Construction
- Structure type: Single storey modular building
- Parking: Yes
- Accessible: Yes

Other information
- Website: liverpoolcruiseport.com

History
- Opened: 2007

Passengers
- Annual: Approx 200,000
Location

The Liverpool Cruise Terminal is a 350-metre-long (1,150-foot) floating structure situated on the River Mersey enabling large cruise ships to visit without entering the enclosed dock system or berthing mid-river and tendering passengers ashore. The terminal was officially opened on 21 September 2007 by the Duke of Kent when the Queen Elizabeth 2 berthed at the terminal. The current terminal is composed mainly of a floating landing stage, with a small passenger terminal building, but a larger terminal is planned by the new operators Global Ports Holding.

== History ==
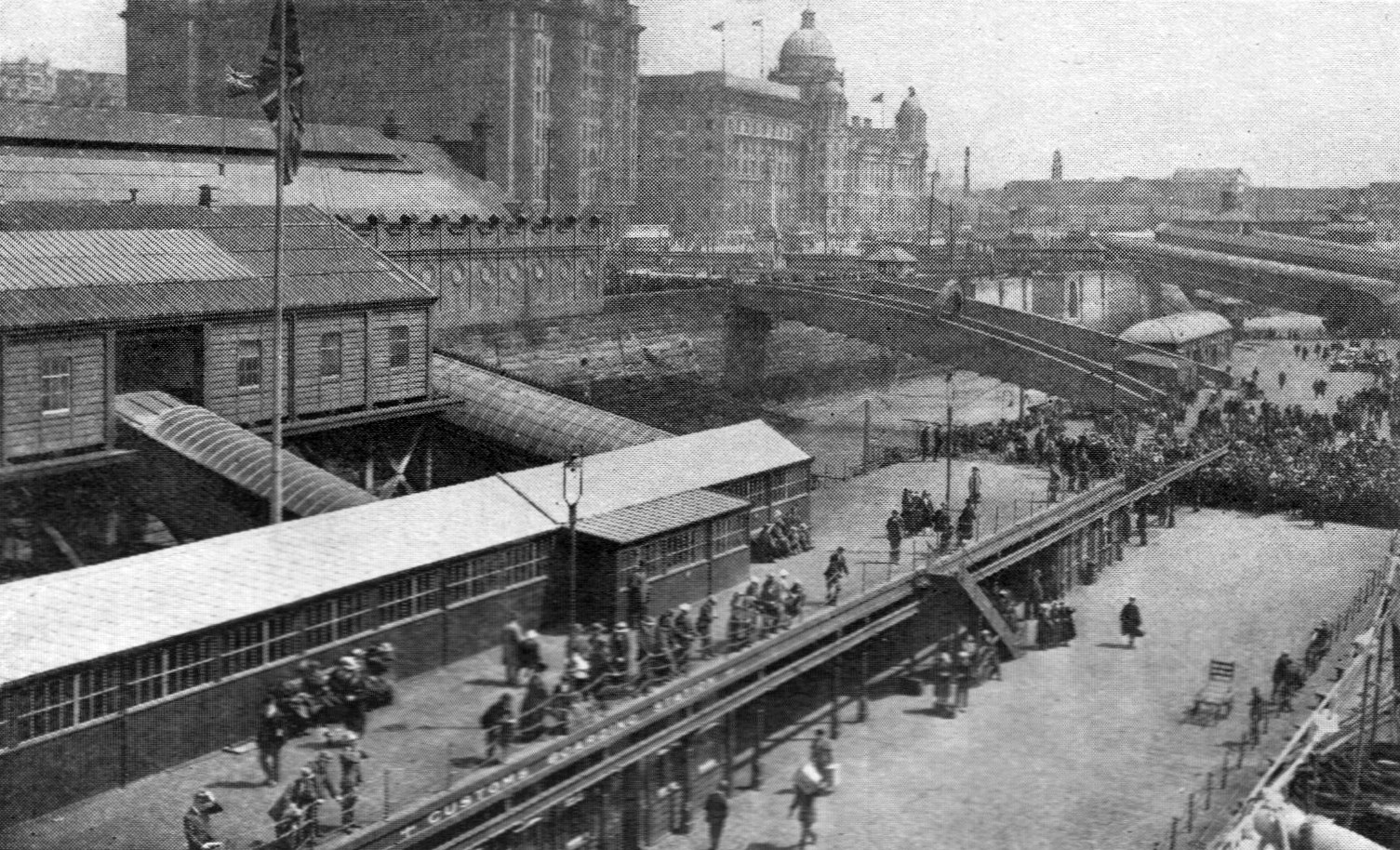
The floating landing stage, Prince's Landing Stage, circa 1930

Liverpool's relationship with cruise liners dates back to the 19th century. Long distance scheduled commercial passenger travel by ship began in Liverpool in 1819 when the SS Savannah became the first steamship to conduct a trans-Atlantic crossing. Regular transatlantic crossing services followed in 1840 with the Britannia-class steamship. This coincided with the opening of Cunard Line's offices on Water Street in the city centre. Cunard went on to open its headquarters in the Cunard Building in 1916.

Princes' Landing Stage at Prince's Dock, next to Pier Head opened in the 1870s and was designed for liners to berth alongside. By 1895, efforts were made to improve the facilities for the embarkation and disembarkation of passengers with the opening of a railway station. Towards the end of the nineteenth century, Liverpool was definitively the second most important port in the British Empire, after London. It had been the main port for the trans-Atlantic passenger trade for over fifty years and one of the most important emigration ports in Europe.

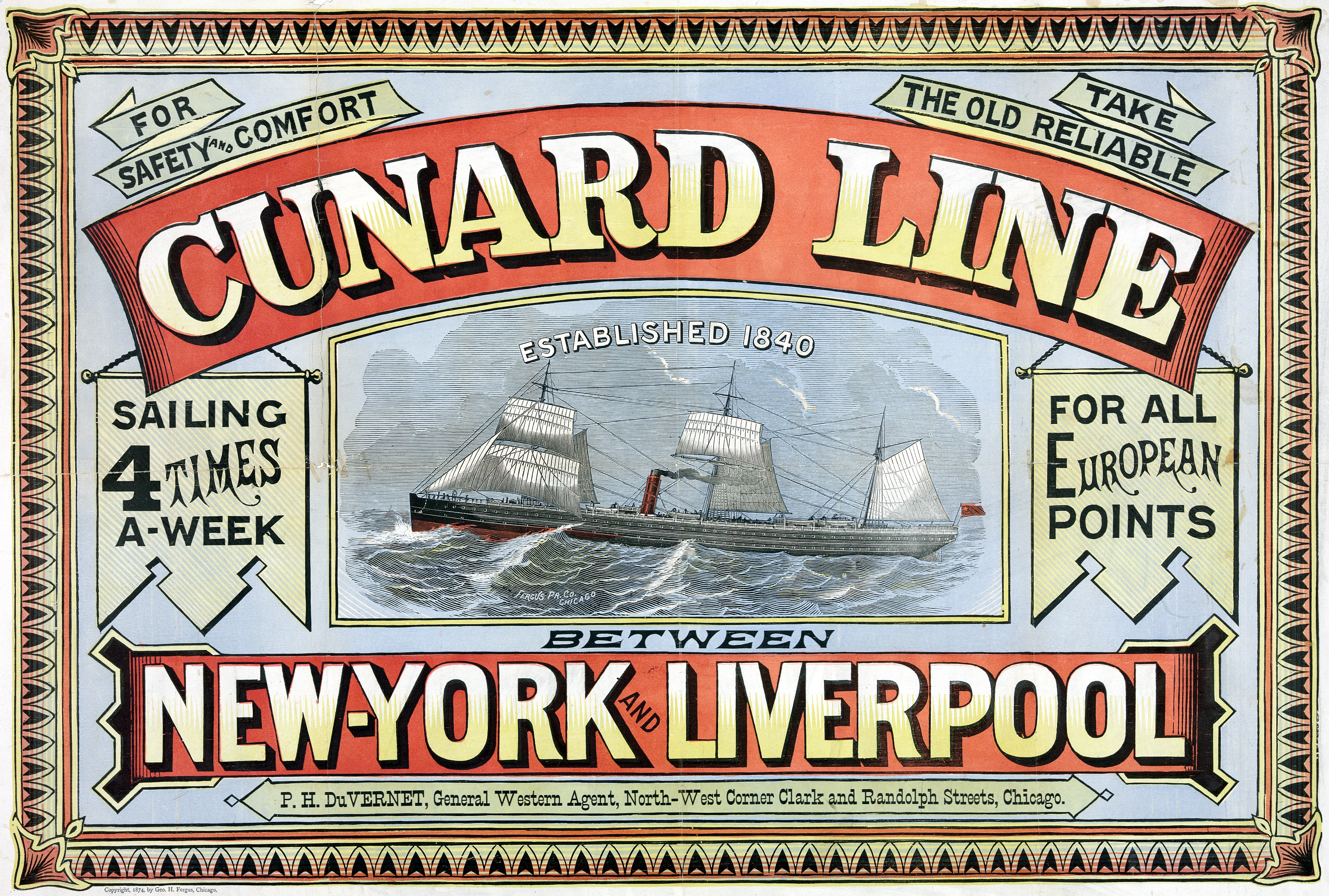
Cunard Line poster (1875) advertising 4 times a week Liverpool-New York passenger service

However, by the early 1960s, Prince's Dock began to decline with the advent of shipping containers. The passenger trade also continued to diminish and both Cunard's and Canadian Pacific's Liverpool cruise services ended in 1967 and 1971 respectively. In 1973, the landing stage was demolished and the dock remained largely redundant and derelict throughout the 1980s. Regeneration of Prince's Dock for commercial, residential and leisure uses began in the 1990s and the new Liverpool Cruise Terminal opened in 2007.

Until 2024, the terminal was run and operated by Culture Liverpool, a department within Liverpool City Council. In 2024, Liverpool City Council ended its control over the terminal and handed the facility to the Peel Ports Group. A 50-year partnership deal was then signed between Peel and Global Ports Holding who became operators of the terminal.

== Opening ==
Annual number of cruise ships, passengers and crew at Liverpool Cruise Terminal
Cruise season	Total vessels	Total passengers and crew	Sources
2007	6	8,274	
2008	11	27,066	
2009	14	31,500	
2010	15	34,120	
2011	15	38,175	
2012	31	54,117	
2013	34	60,342	
2014	47	83,160	
2015	54	117,635	
2016	63	115,000	
2017	62	110,000	
2018	58	102,000	
2019	89	178,906	
2020 (COVID-19 pandemic)	1		
2021	>90		
2022	107	>200,000	
2023	102	>186,000	

The Liverpool Cruise Terminal was opened in 2007 at a total cost of £19 million and is capable of accommodating vessels of 345 metres (1,132 ft) in length and 10 metres (33 ft) draft. The terminal was mostly funded by grants of £9 million from the UK government and £8.6 million from the European Regional Development Fund.

The £9.2 million grant from the UK government came with the condition that the terminal could only be used for cruise port-of-calls, which meant cruises would not be allowed to begin or end at the terminal. "Turnaround" visits generate more revenue for the port and city than port-of-calls. The reason for the restriction was that it was to minimize unfair competition with other ports that had been built with private funding, particularly Southampton. Liverpool City Council tried unsuccessfully to have this restriction removed in 2009. In July 2011, the council offered to pay back part of the UK government funding in exchange for being allowed turnaround visits, which led Associated British Ports, the owner of Southampton Docks, to take legal advice. The Southampton Chamber of Commerce collected 12,000 signatures on a petition against the change. Liverpool city council did cite that £70 million of public money was spent in upgrading the rail link from Southampton Docks to the Midlands container terminals competing directly with the Port of Liverpool. This fell on deaf ears. However, in March 2012, the government agreed a repayment offer from Liverpool Council and construction of a temporary terminal building began on the shore and floating terminal landing stage.

Full turnaround services commenced at the terminal on Tuesday 29 May 2012 when Ocean Countess departed on its journey to the Norwegian fjords. Therefore, passengers were once again enabled to start and finish their cruise journeys from Prince's Dock for the first time in 40 years.

== Facilities ==
The existing terminal was designed and built to be temporary and the present passenger facilities have an internal floor area of 800m². During its lifespan, the terminal is designed to handle approximately 900 passengers on daily 'turnaround' operations. However, it has been recognised by both Liverpool City Council (previous operators) and Global Ports Holding (current operators), that the facilities need to be expanded to meet passenger growth and the associated increase in throughput from larger cruise ships. The Mersey Docks and Harbour Company has previously argued that existing facilities will need to be upgraded to improve the passenger experience, particularly surrounding waiting times, check in and baggage collection, security, border control and the local road network. The current operators, Global Ports Holding, plan to expand the port's infrastructure to provide for future potential, more ships and passengers.

The cruise terminal was developed in conjunction with improvements to the Isle of Man ferry terminal, operated by the Isle of Man Steam Packet Company. The Royal Navy also berths ships at the terminal several times a year, often allowing the public to visit the ships.

The terminal has seen strong growth since it was established and by 2024, it had welcomed over 800 vessels and more than 1 million passengers to the city of Liverpool.

== Cruise lines and services ==
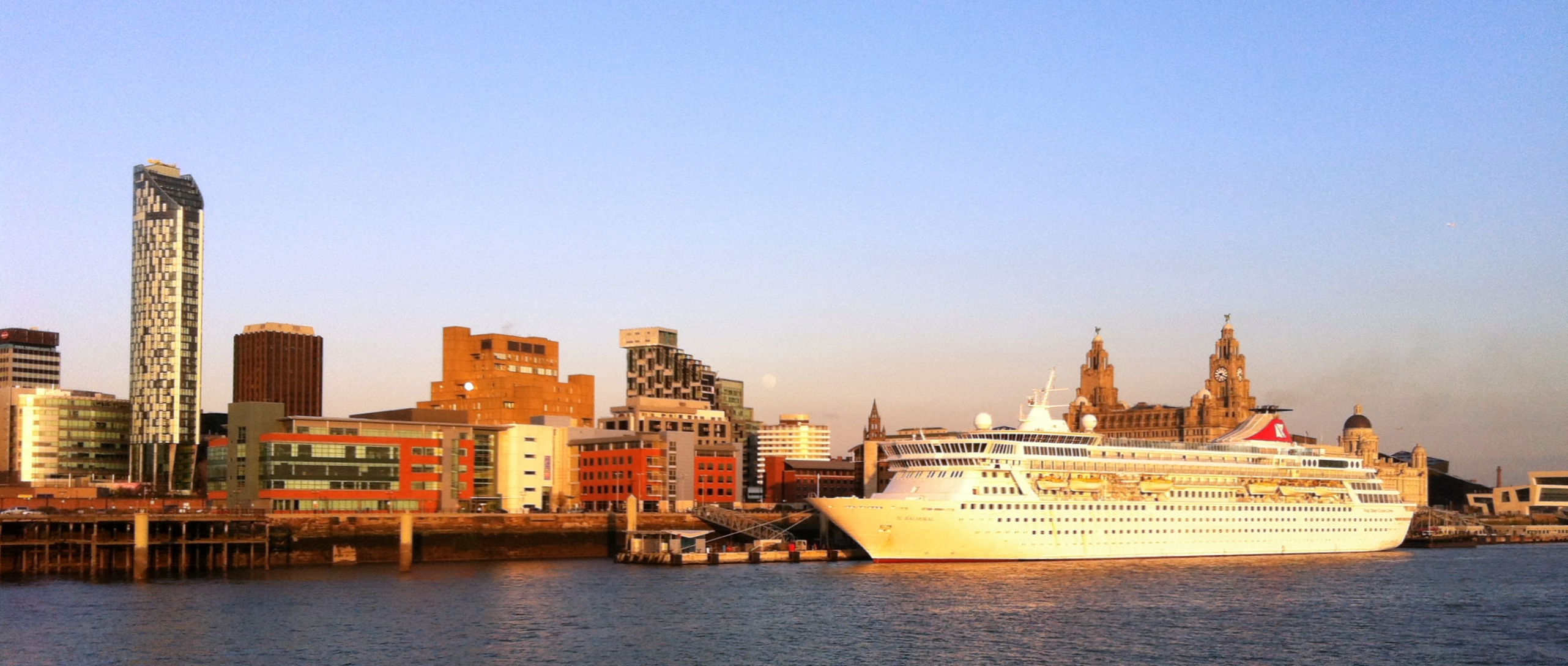
MV Balmoral at the Liverpool Cruise Terminal. The terminal is used both for visiting cruise ships and for full 'turnaround' facilities. Ocean liners can, therefore, start and finish their voyages here. Liners berth on Liverpool's waterfront close to the Royal Liver Building.

The current cruise schedule for operations into and out of the Cruise Terminal can be found on the Cruise Liverpool website. The schedule is updated regularly.

Many cruise lines have served the Liverpool Cruise Terminal. Ports in Australia, Faroe Islands, France, Iceland, Ireland, North America, Norway, Outer Hebrides, Portugal, Spain and the Caribbean are served by the facility. The cruise lines that have served the terminal include the following:

- AIDA Cruises
- Ambassador
- Atlas Ocean Voyages
- Azamara
- Carnival Cruise Line
- Celebrity Cruises
- Costa Cruises
- Cruise & Maritime Voyages
- Crystal Cruises
- Cunard Line
- Disney Cruise Line
- Fred Olsen
- Hapag-Lloyd cruises
- Holland America Line
- MSC Cruises
- Mystic Cruises
- Noble Caledonia
- Norwegian
- Oceania Cruises
- Phoenix Reisen
- P&O Cruises
- Princess Cruises
- Pullmantur Cruises
- Regent Seven Seas
- Royal Caribbean
- Saga Cruises
- Seabourn Cruise Line
- Silversea Cruises
- TUI Cruises
- Viking

== Future expansion ==
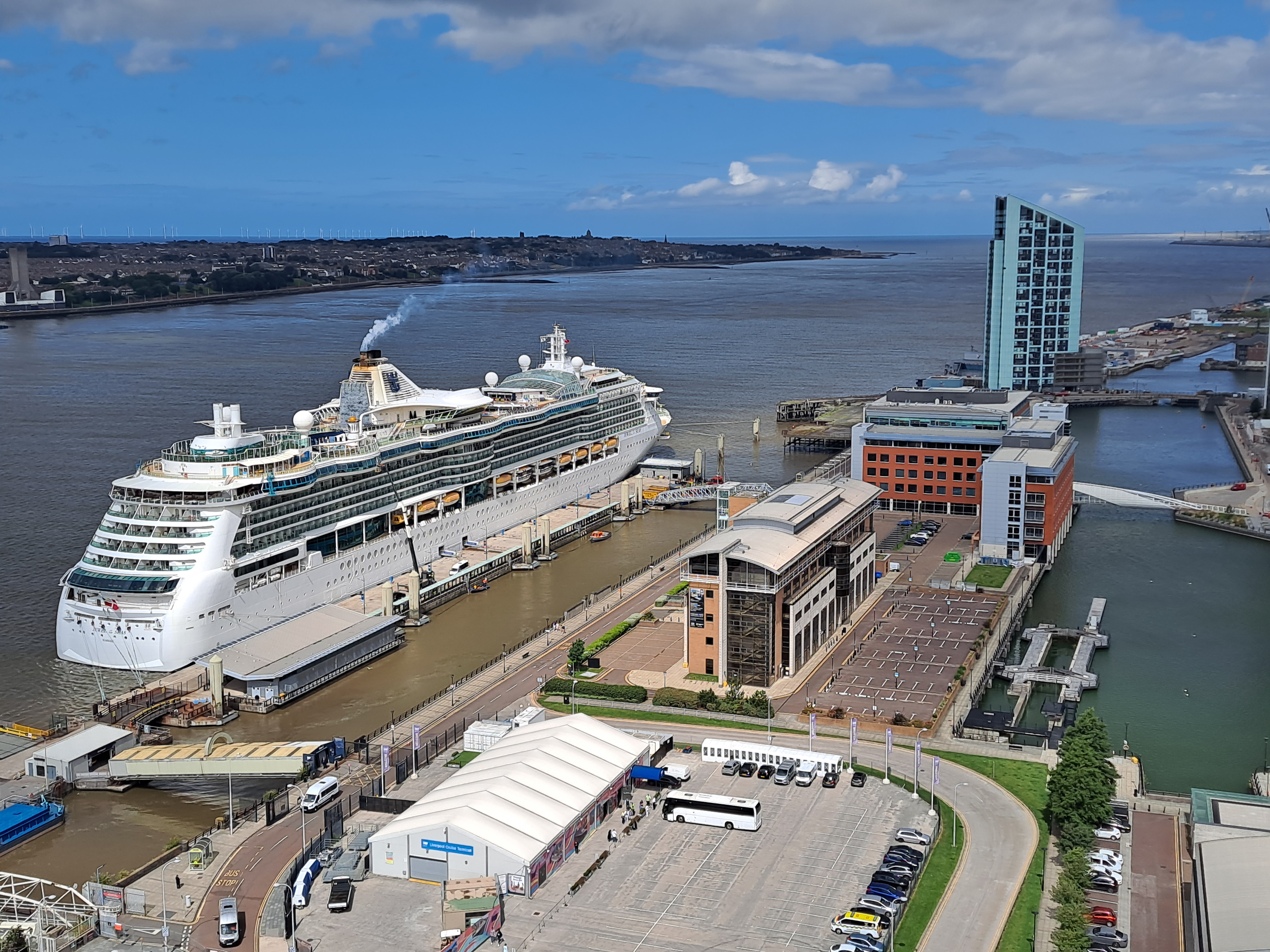
The current Liverpool Cruise Terminal from above showing the white single-storey passenger facilities in the foreground

The cruise terminal is part of the £5.5 billion Liverpool Waters scheme to regenerate 60 hectares of dockland in Liverpool.

=== Global Ports Holding plans ===
On 3 April 2024, it was reported that Global Ports Holding (GPH) would take over Liverpool Cruise Terminal, pledging a £25m upgrade. As a result, earlier plans by Liverpool City Council for a new £88m terminal and hotel were abandoned. The GPH upgrade includes a new floating pontoon to increase capacity and a terminal building for retail and hospitality, marking a shift from the city council's previous ambitions for a larger development.

=== Liverpool City Council plans ===
Liverpool City Council, when they operated the facility, planned a second terminal scheme which they approved in March 2012. The project then received UK Government approval in March 2013.

Liverpool City Council unveiled preliminary plans for a £50 million development for the proposed new cruise stage in September 2017. The new facility was to be built slightly further down the Mersey at Princes Dock where the old wooden landing stage currently lies. The new terminal would have handled ships with up to 3,600 passengers and included dedicated passport control as well as a cafe. Plans were submitted for planning permission by the council in November 2017. Work on the new facility did not proceed.

Belfast building and civil engineering firm McLaughlin & Harvey were awarded a contract in March 2018 to support the council during the first of the two phases of development. The first phase of the project would have involved finalising the design and construction of the new facility and the removal of the existing derelict Princess Jetty. Planning permission for the new facility and the removal of the old jetty was granted in April 2018. £20 million of funding was granted from Liverpool City Region Combined Authority in August 2018 towards financing the next phase of the project, which was due to start in October of that year. Issues around increased costs and COVID-19 saw the development of the second terminal grind to a halt with no new terminal constructed. In November 2023, Liverpool City Council revealed that Global Ports Holding would be taking over the running of the facility, with the hope that they would choose to develop a new terminal as part of the deal.

== Gallery ==
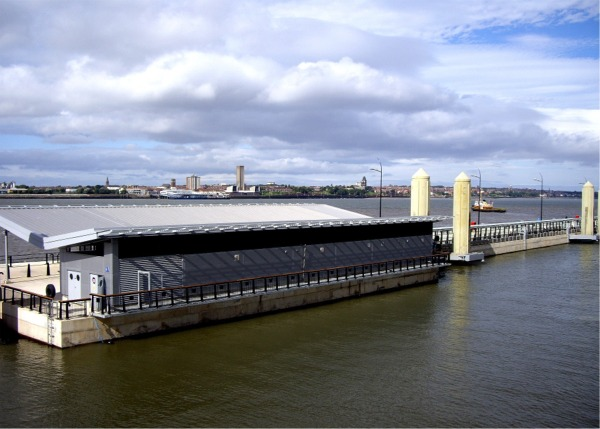
Liverpool Cruise Terminal

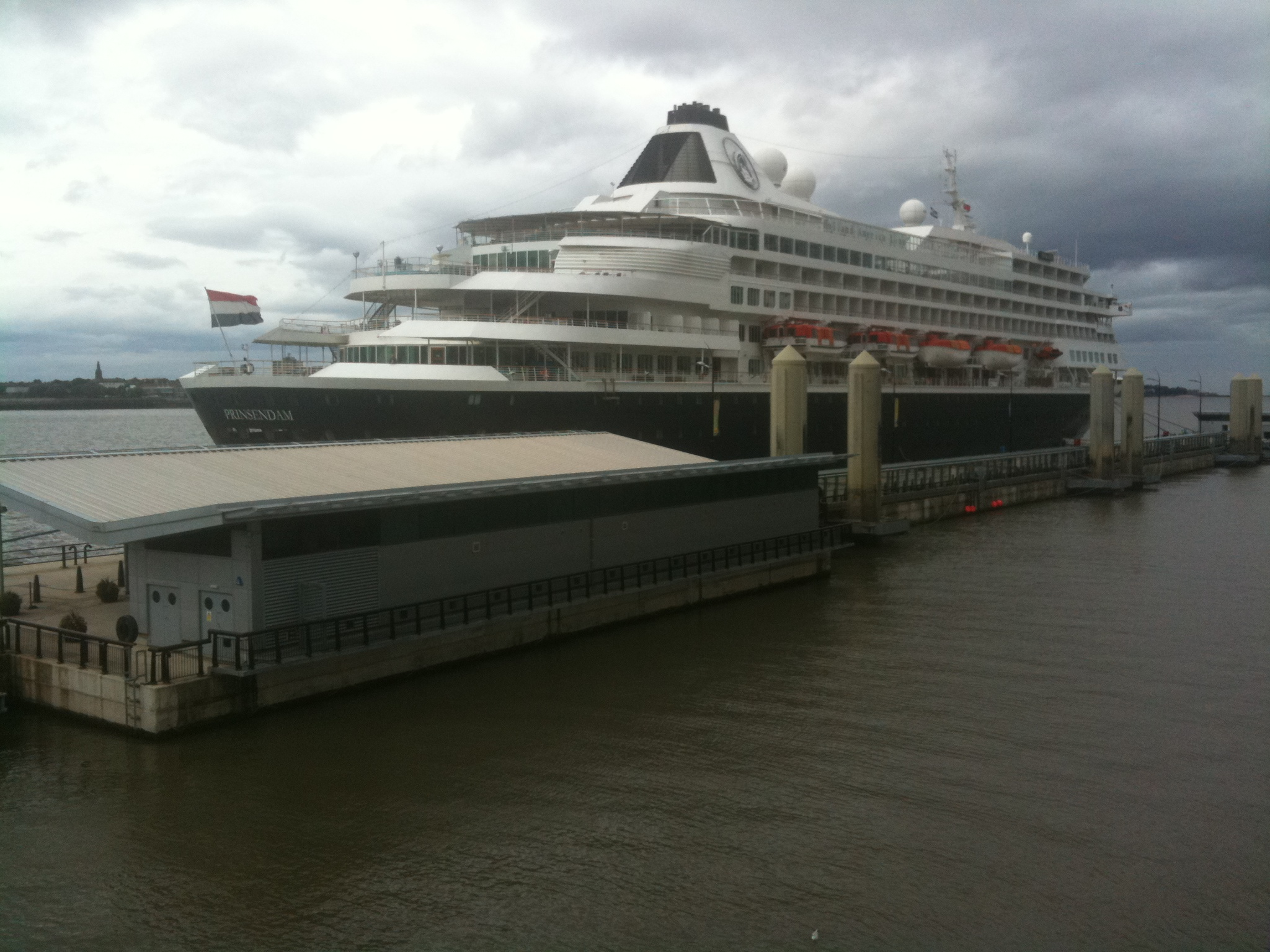
Prinsendam

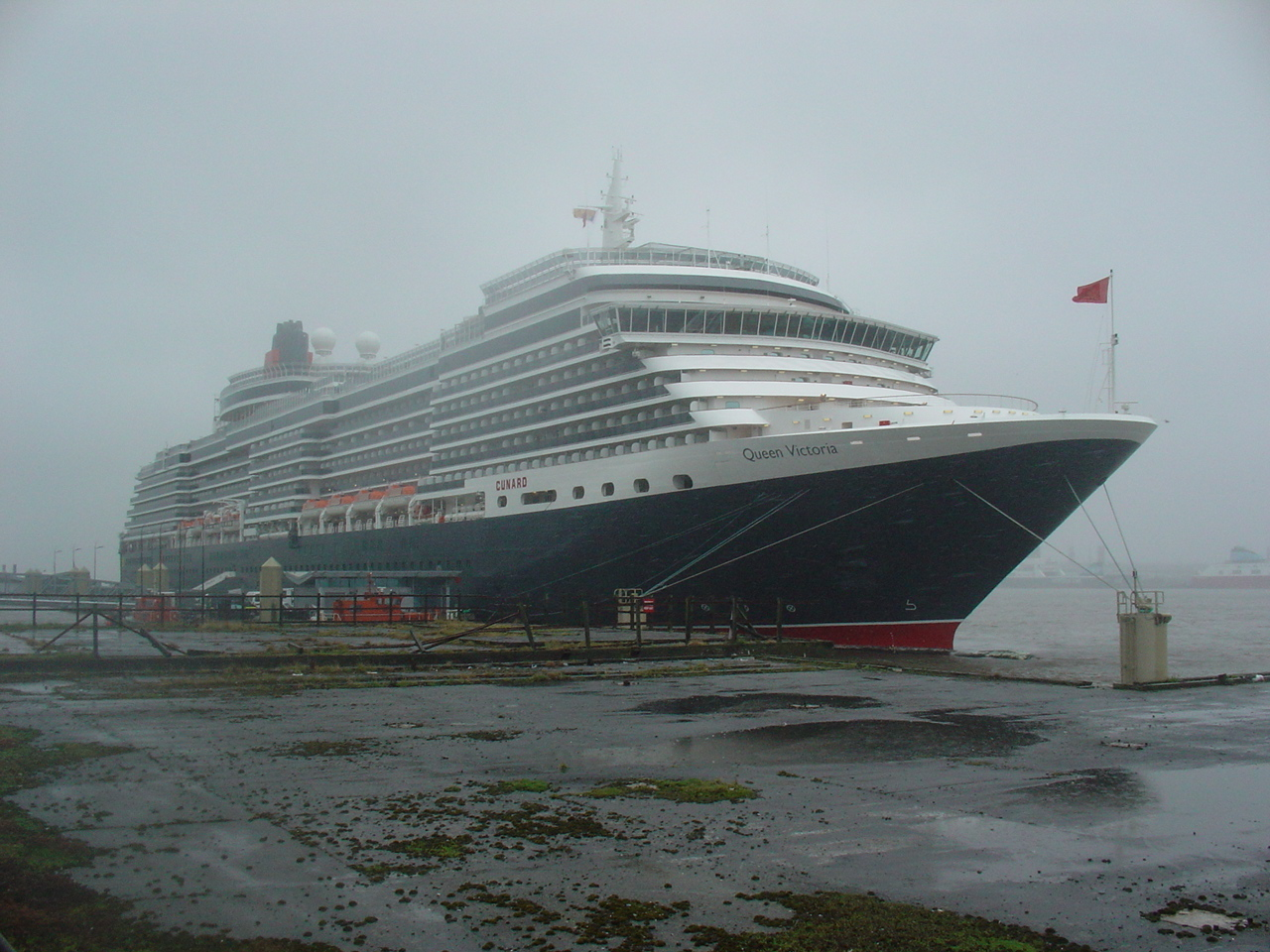
Queen Victoria

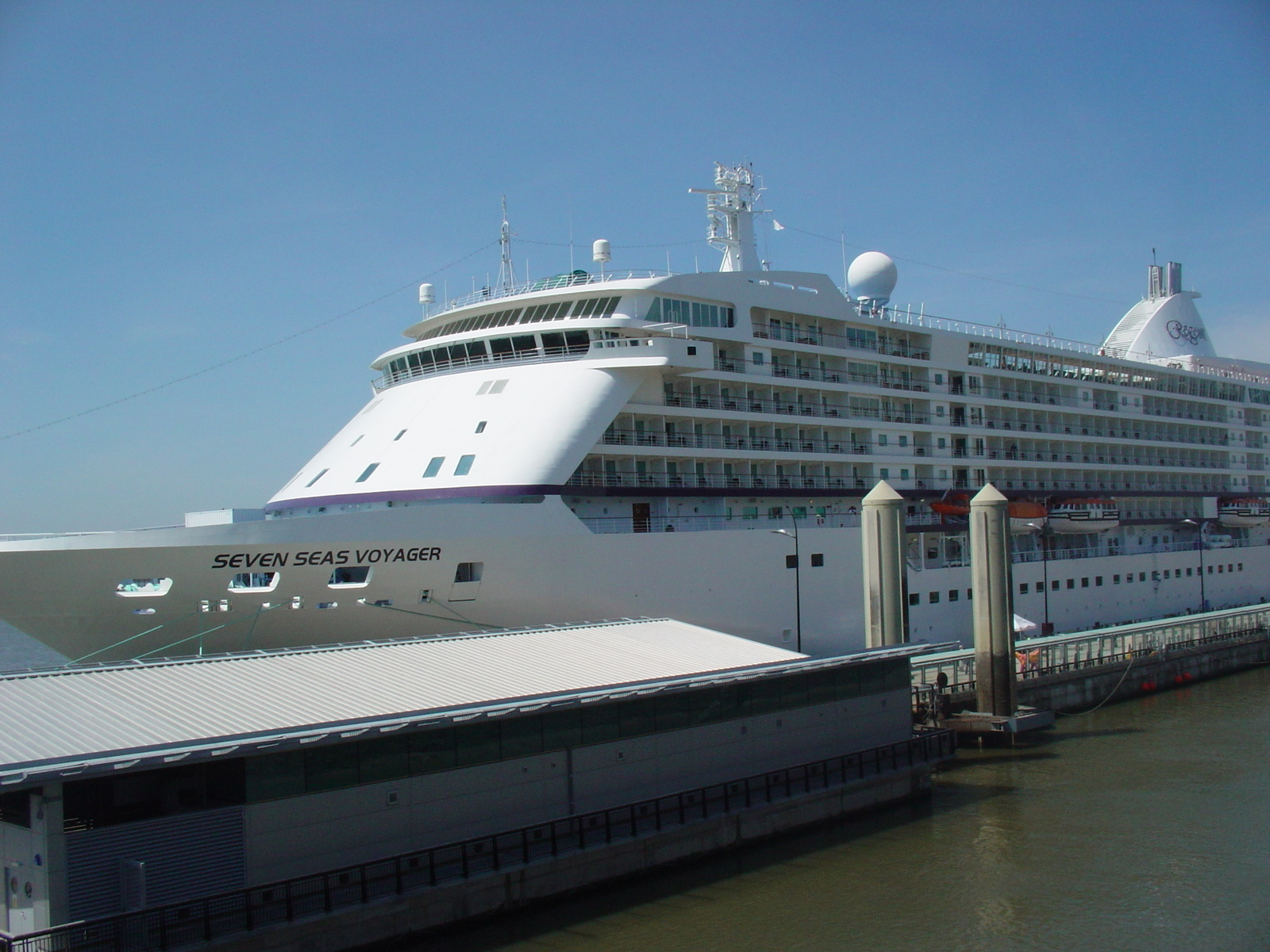
Seven Seas Voyager

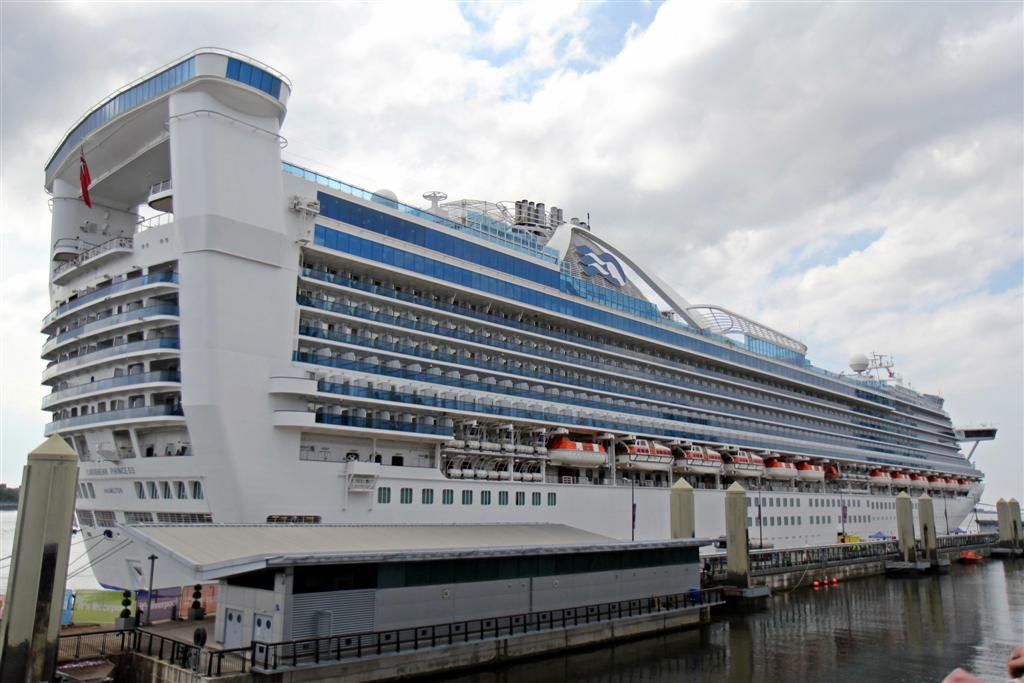
Caribbean Princess 2012

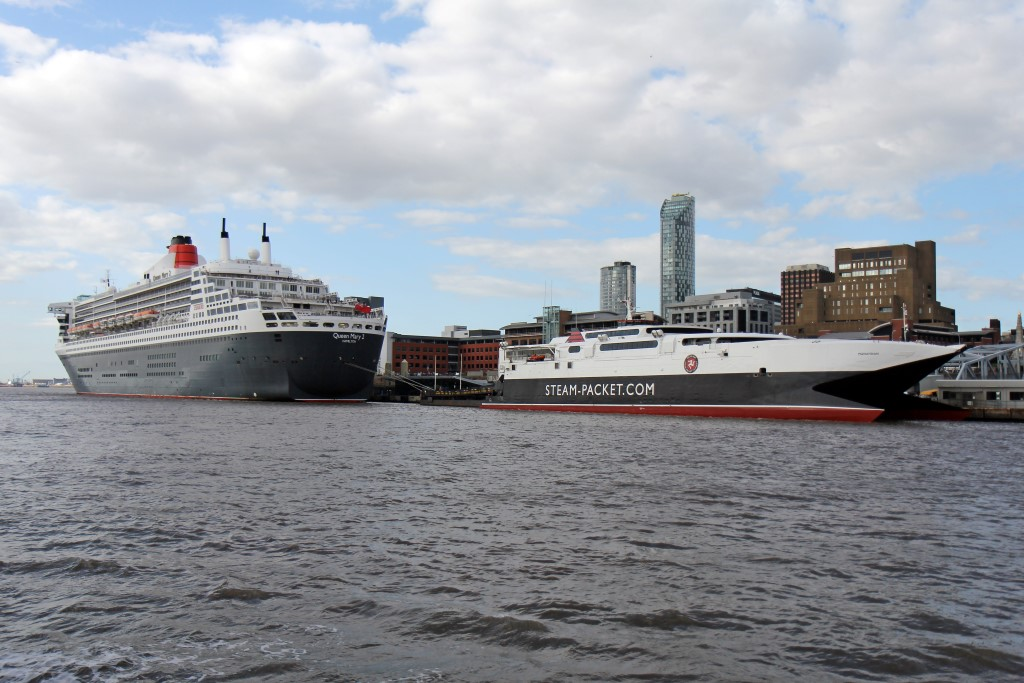
Queen Mary 2 with Manannan

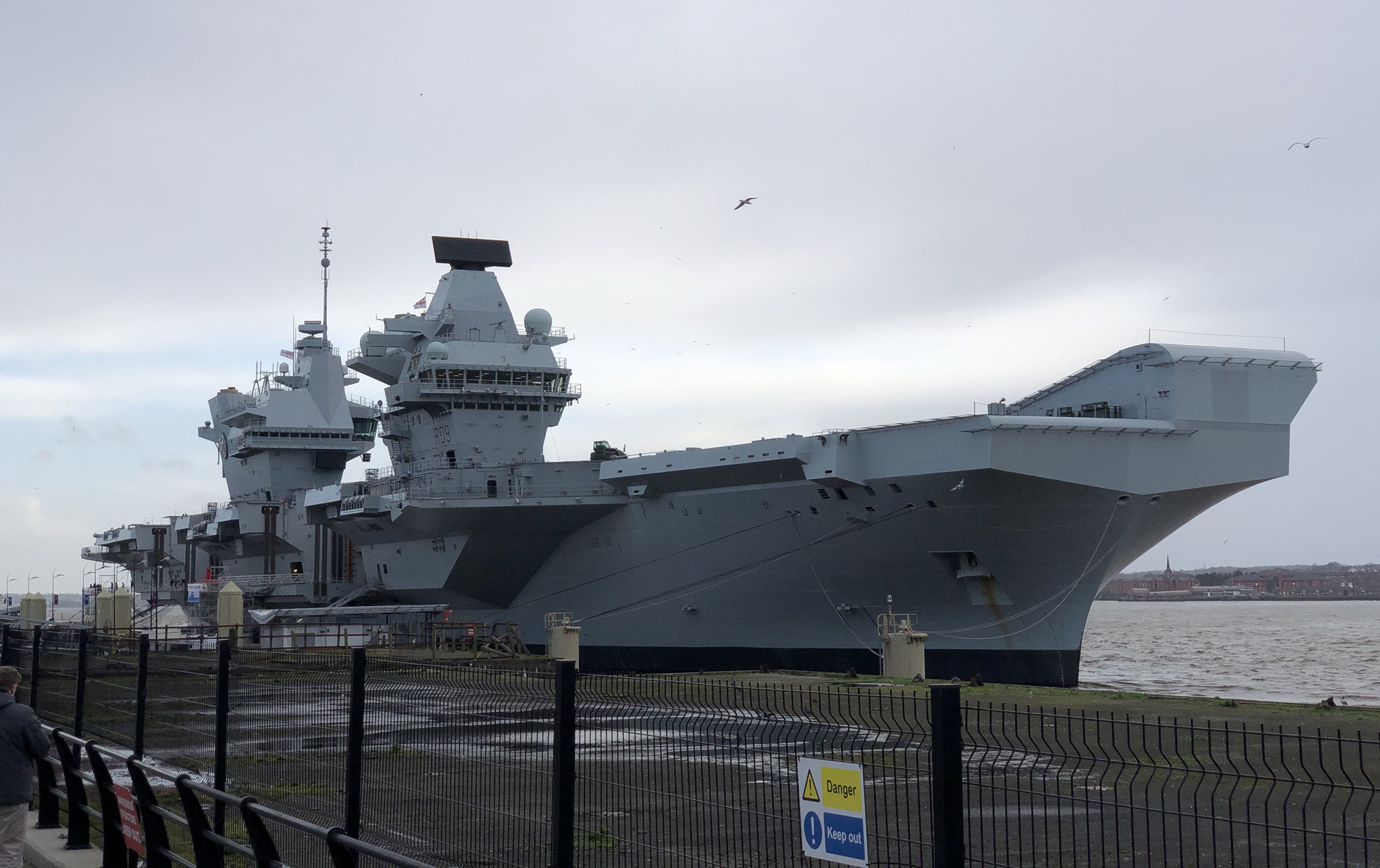
HMS Prince of Wales
