= Alexandra Tower, Liverpool =

Coordinates: 53.4112°N 3.0014°W

Alexandra Tower
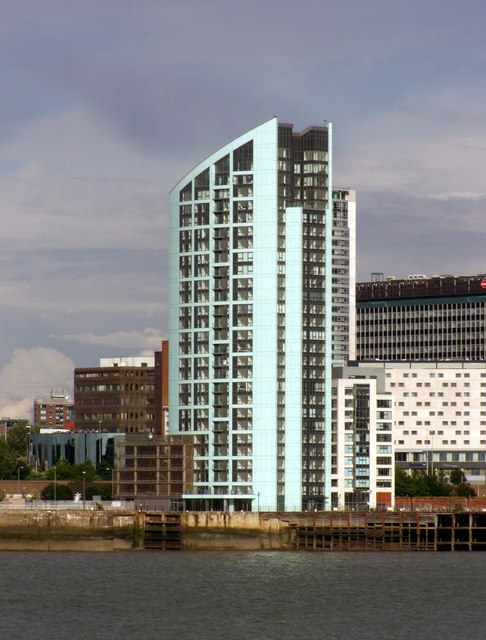
- Interactive map of the Alexandra Tower area

General information
- Type: Residential Apartment
- Location: Prince's Dock, Liverpool, England, United Kingdom
- Coordinates: SJ338904
- Construction started: 2005
- Completed: 2008
- Opening: 2007

Height
- Roof: 88 m (289 ft)

Technical details
- Floor count: 27

Design and construction
- Architect: AFL Architects
- Developer: Millennium Estates

Alexandra Tower is a residential tower located in the Prince's Dock area of Liverpool, England. It was constructed between 2005 and 2008 and upon completion became the sixth tallest building in Liverpool. The tower has a total 27 floors, with 201 apartments, reaching a height of 88 metres (290 ft).

In March 2010, a 100 kilograms (220 lb) decorative glass panel shattered and fell from the building onto the ground below. The cause is not known, although it is thought that temperature fluctuations caused by overnight freezing and subsequent heating during the day may have been responsible. To date only some safety scaffolding remains in place to catch any falling debris.

Following the issues with the glazing, the developer Millenium Estates Ltd went into administration and was taken over by Zolfo Cooper (Alix Partners). The building was deemed unsafe and was applied with a Section 77 (dangerous buildings act) due to the issues with nickel sulphide inclusions in some of the glass.

In 2015, the building was acquired by Colin Wright in a company called Mersey Investments ltd. (IOM). Colin who is a Dubai-based developer (of Macintyre Asset Management / Macintyre Group) acquired the building and proceeded to resolve the glazing issues, removed the Section 77 and completed the unfinished works inside the building.

== Gallery ==
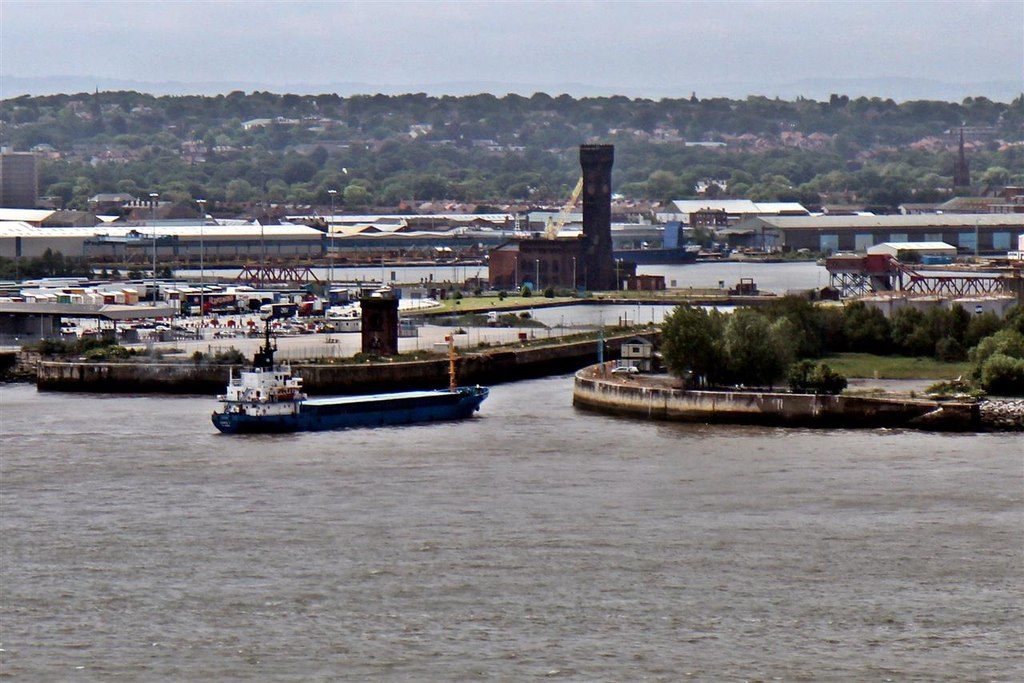
A view towards the entrance to the Great Float, from one of the upper floors of Alexandra Tower.

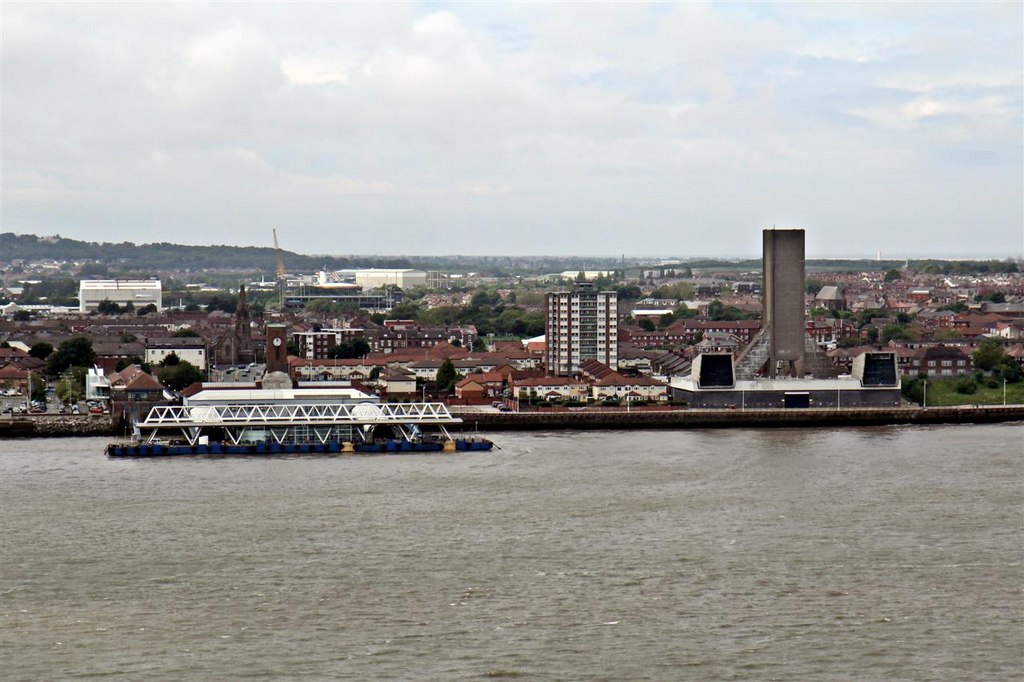
A view of Seacombe Ferry Terminal, as seen from one of the upper floors.

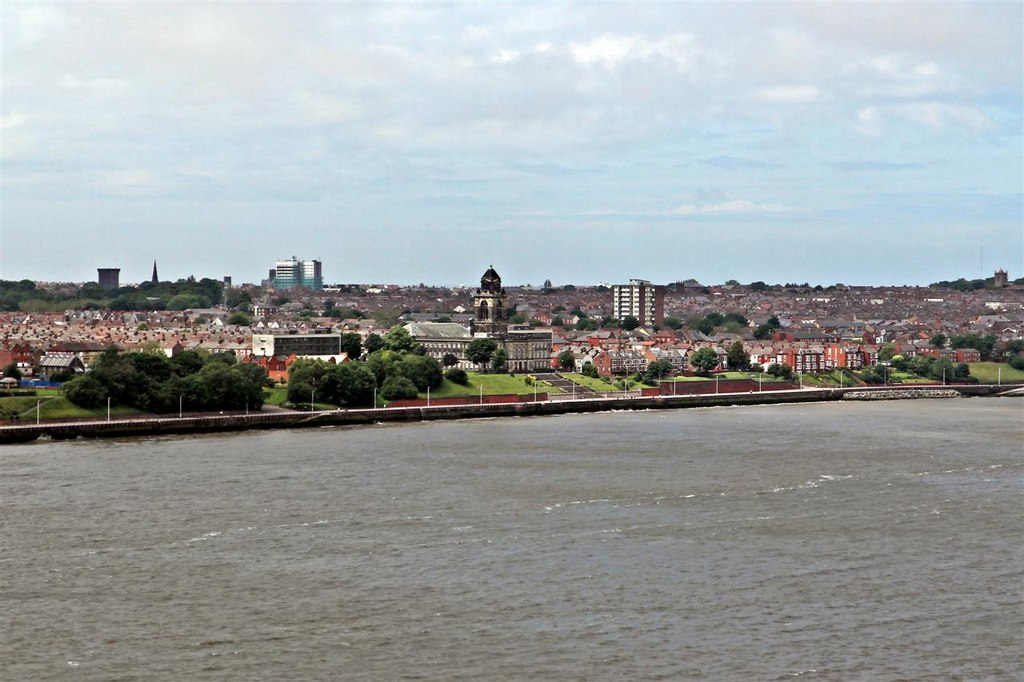
Wallasey Town Hall and Seacombe Promenade, viewed from an upper floor.

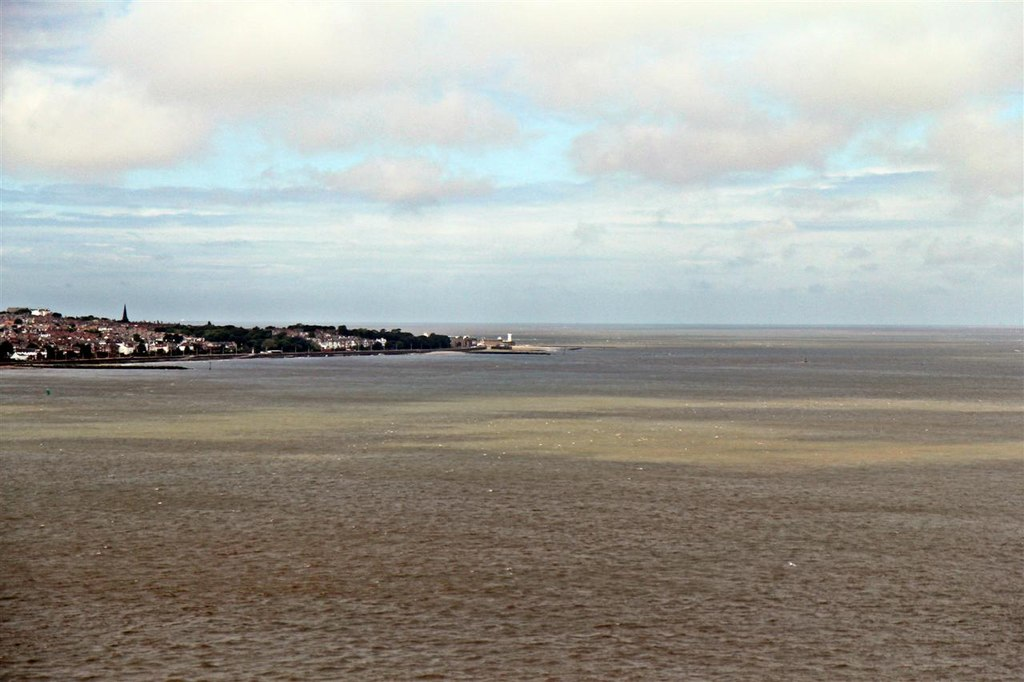
Looking towards New Brighton and Liverpool Bay, viewed from an upper floor.
