= 1 Princes Dock =

22-storey residential complex in Liverpool, England

Coordinates: 53.4111°N 2.9995°W

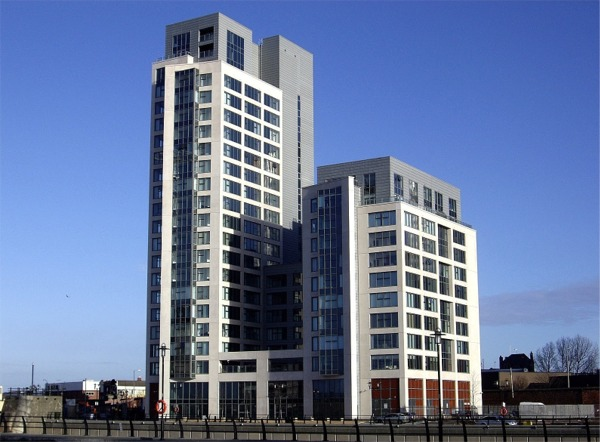
- Interactive map of the 1 Princes Dock area

General information
- Type: Residential
- Location: Prince's Dock, Liverpool, England, United Kingdom
- Construction started: 2004
- Completed: 2006

Height
- Roof: 73 metres (240 ft)

Technical details
- Floor count: 22

Design and construction
- Architect: AFL Architects

1 Princes Dock (also known as Liverpool City Lofts) is a 22-storey residential complex located alongside Prince's Dock, in Liverpool, England. It was completed in 2006 and at 73 metres (240 ft) is the city's joint-tenth-tallest building. The building is home to 162 flats and 99 parking spaces. 1 Princes Dock was first proposed in 2003 and was quickly approved with construction commencing in the next year; the building was designed by AFL Architects and developed by City Lofts Group PLC. The main contractor was Carillion Construction.

== Gallery ==
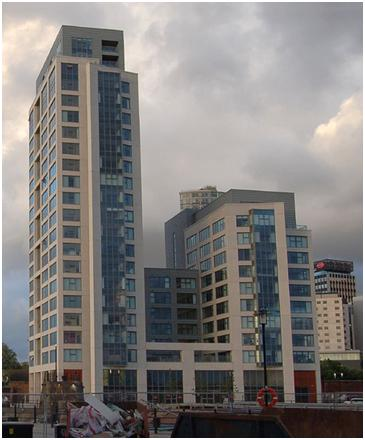

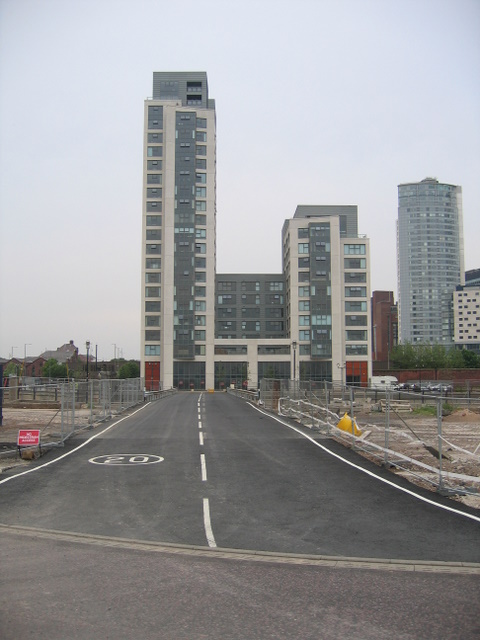
