= Brocklebank Dock =

Dock on the River Mersey, England

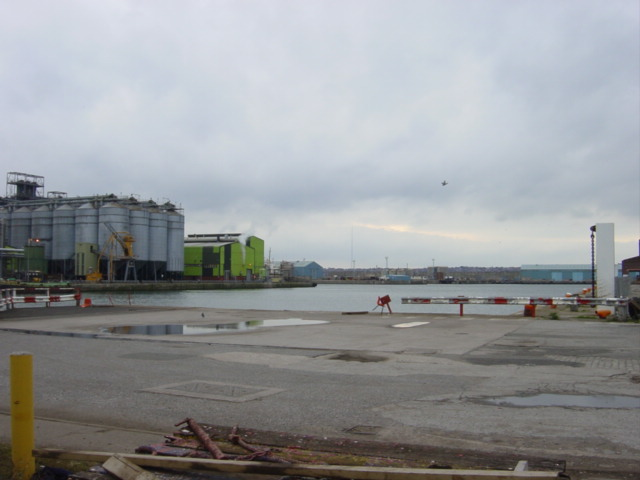
- Brocklebank Dock, Bootle

Location
- Location: Bootle, Merseyside, United Kingdom
- Coordinates: 53.4412°N 3.0065°W
- OS grid: SJ332942

Details
- Owner: The Peel Group
- Operator: Mersey Docks and Harbour Company
- Opened: 1862
- Type: Wet dock
- Joins: Langton Dock; Canada Dock

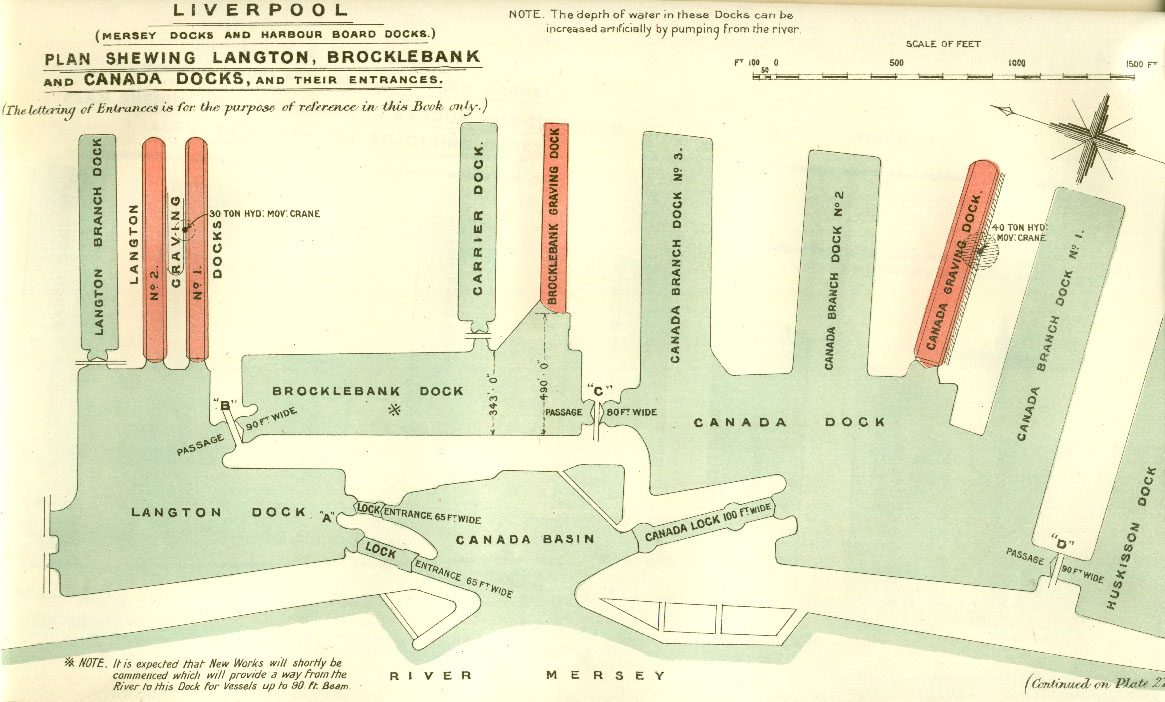
British Empire Dockyards and Ports, 1909

Brocklebank Dock is a dock on the River Mersey, England, and part of the Port of Liverpool. It is situated in the northern dock system in Bootle, connected to Langton Dock to the north and Canada Dock to the south. Carriers' Dock was originally sited to the east.

== History ==
Known as Canada Half Tide Dock when opened in 1862, it had two branch docks to the east which were known as North and South Carriers' Docks. Timber was initially the principal cargo, with fire a consequent safety concern. The original river entrance presented navigational difficulties, with the area affected by silting. The dock was renamed in 1879 in honour of Ralph Brocklebank, Chairman of the Mersey Docks and Harbour Board between 1863 and 1869.

By the 1920s, the dock was home to the Houlder Brothers shipping company which operated to South America, and to the Commonwealth Line which operated to Australia.

Subsequent modifications were made to Brocklebank Dock and the surrounding basins during the twentieth century, including the new Langton River Entrance in 1958.

Brocklebank Dock provided facilities for transporting passengers and freight between Liverpool and Belfast, in Northern Ireland, until it was superseded by the Twelve Quays ferry terminal at Birkenhead.
