= Canada Dock =

Dock on the River Mersey, Liverpool, England

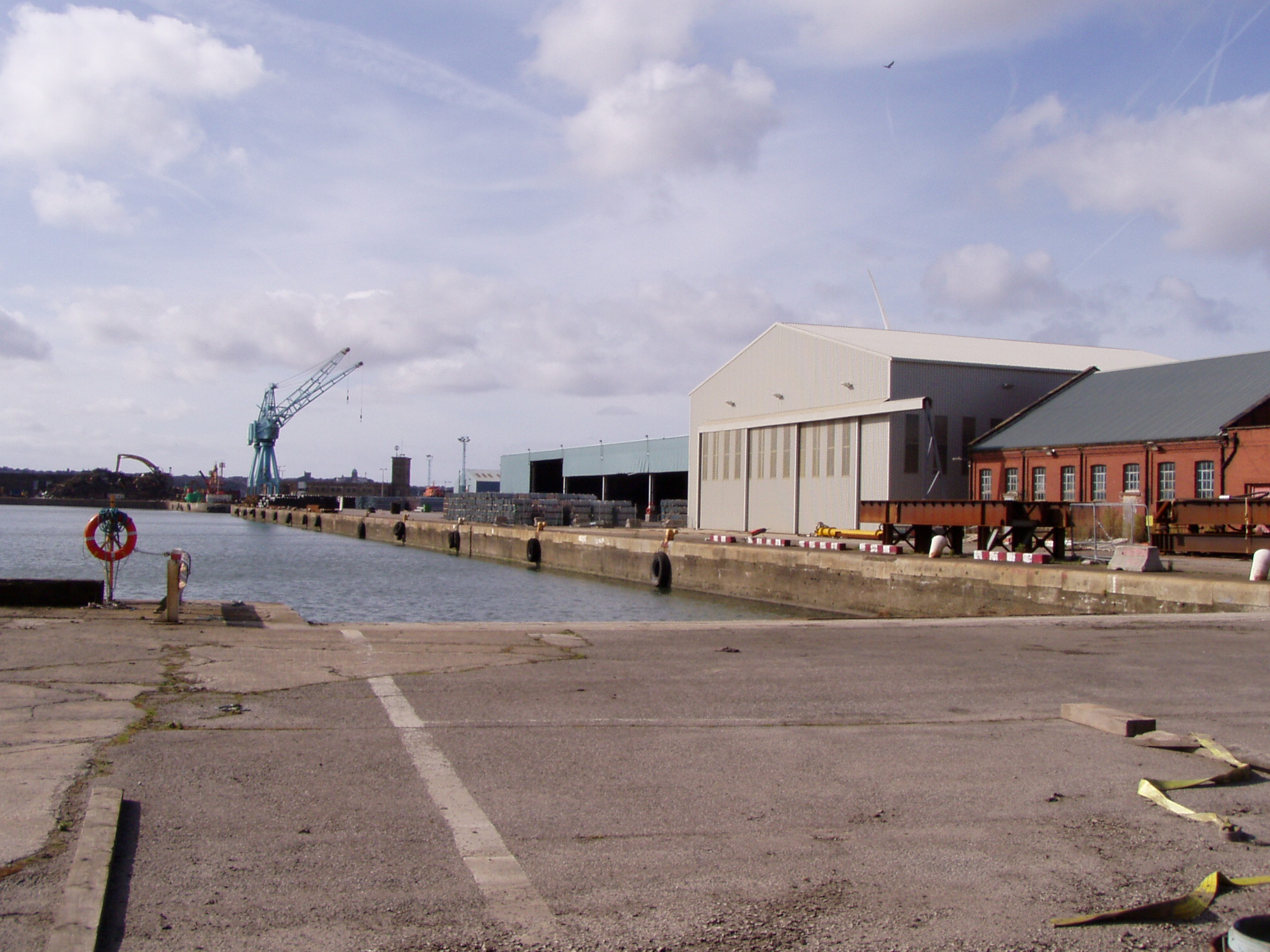
- Canada Branch Dock No. 3, in 2009

Location
- Location: Kirkdale, Liverpool, Merseyside, United Kingdom
- Coordinates: 53.4365°N 3.0050°W
- OS grid: SJ333938

Details
- Owner: The Peel Group
- Operator: Mersey Docks and Harbour Company
- Opened: 1859
- Type: Wet dock
- Joins: Brocklebank Dock; Huskisson Dock
- Area: 17 acres (6.9 ha), 4,043 sq yd (3,380 m^{2})
- Width at entrance: 100 ft (30 m)
- Quay length: 1,272 yd (1,163 m)

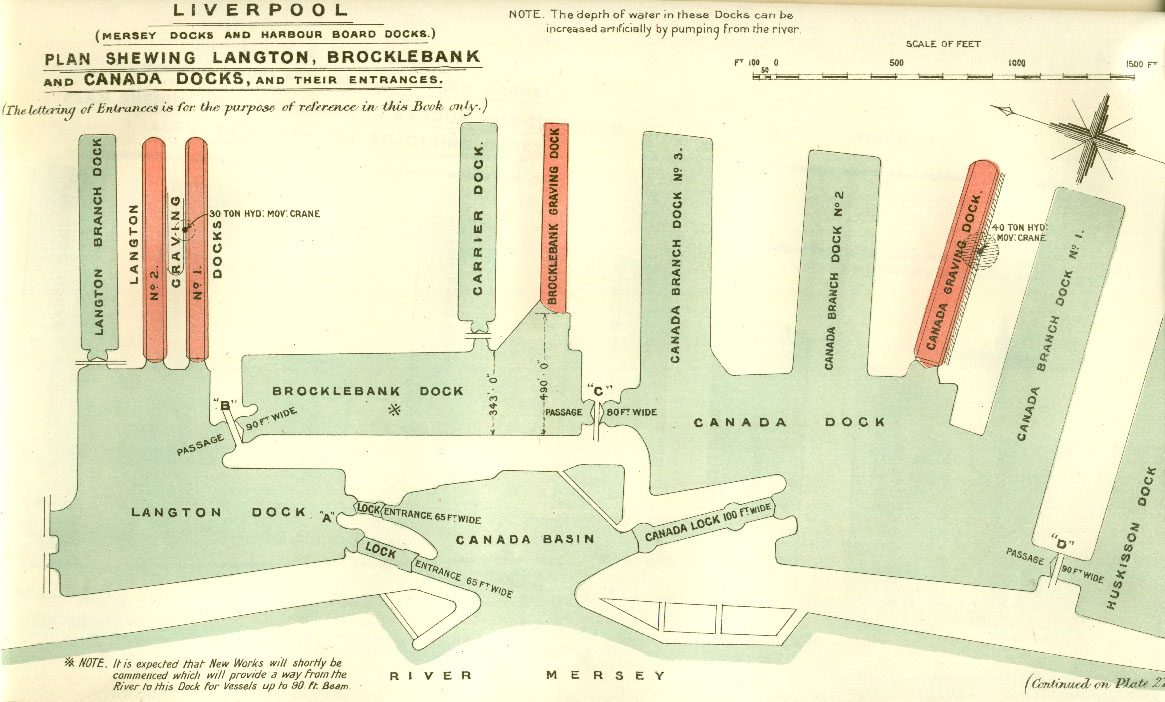
British Empire Dockyards and Ports, 1909

Canada Dock is a dock on the River Mersey, England, and part of the Port of Liverpool. It is situated in the northern dock system in Kirkdale. Canada Dock consists of a main basin nearest the river wall with three branch docks and a graving dock to the east. It is connected to Brocklebank Dock to the north and Huskisson Dock to the south.

== History ==
The dock was the last and biggest designed by Jesse Hartley, opening in 1859. In 1862, the Canada half-tide basin, which became Brocklebank Dock, was added by George Fosbery Lyster. Canada Dock dealt in timber being named after the main source of the trade, Canada. Fire was the greatest concern and the dock was initially kept isolated from the rest of the dock system for safety reasons. However, a fire did occur in 1893 causing £50,000 of damage. The original river entrance also presented navigational difficulties, with the area affected by silting. Modifications to the basin took place in the late nineteenth and early twentieth centuries, creating the branch docks and graving dock.

The removal of the problematic tidal basin took place only after World War II, following a complete rebuild. Further improvements took place during the 1950s and 1960s as the dock became a base for cargo liner companies such as Harrison Line.

The dock was used as a ro-ro berth during the early 1990s.

=== Railway connections ===
The dock was connected to the national rail network by the Canada Dock Branch Line. The short branch line from Atlantic Junction, just west of Kirkdale railway station, into the dock was closed on 12 September 1982. The terminus was Canada Dock railway station. Although the branch line closed to passengers in 1941, it remained in use for goods. The Route Utilisation Strategy states that there should be no building on the short path of the old track in case it requires reinstating.

From 1893, passenger services were also provided by the Liverpool Overhead Railway via Canada Dock (LOR) station until 1956.

== Present ==
Canada Dock remains in use, handling general bulk cargoes and as a site for scrap metal processing and storage.

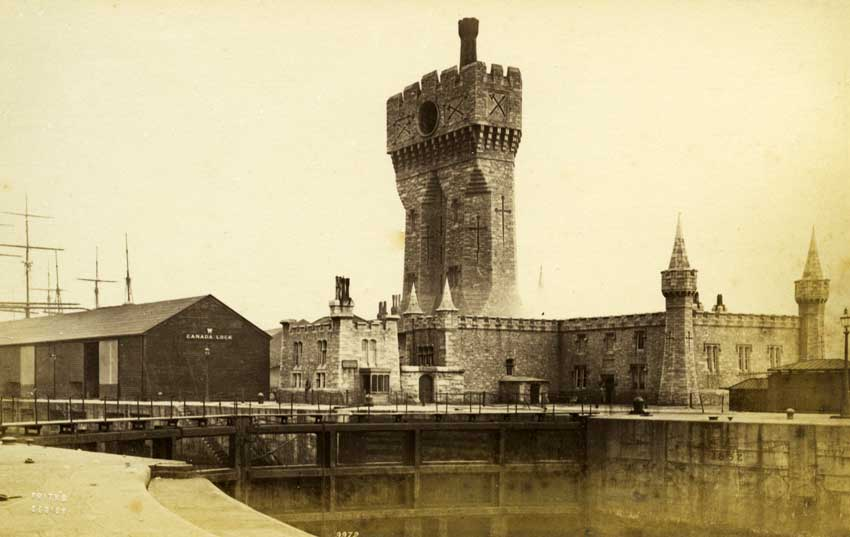
Canada Dock hydraulic tower (photographed 1875)
