= Langton Dock =

Dock in Bootle, Merseyside, England

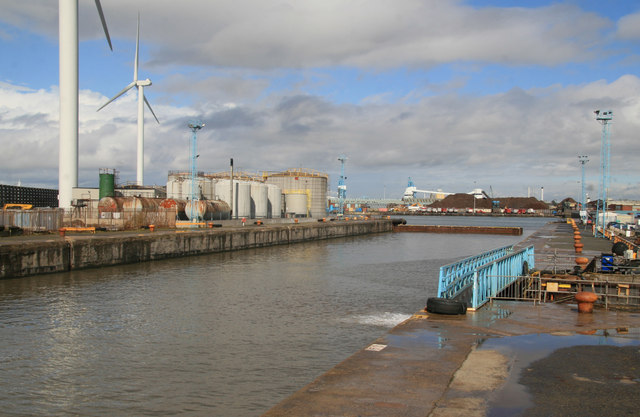
- The lock of the Langton River Entrance

Location
- Location: Bootle, Merseyside, United Kingdom
- Coordinates: 53.4436°N 3.0092°W
- OS grid: SJ330945

Details
- Owner: The Peel Group
- Operator: Mersey Docks and Harbour Company
- Opened: 1881
- Type: Wet dock
- Joins: River Mersey; Alexandra Dock; Brocklebank Dock

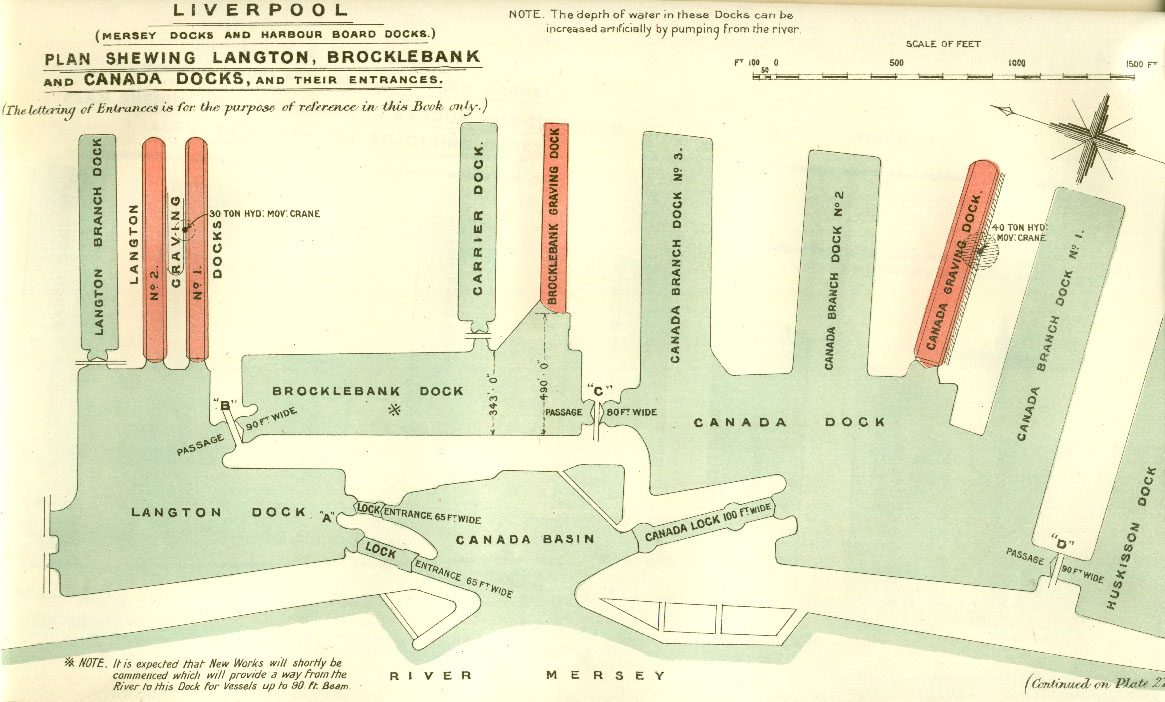
British Empire Dockyards and Ports, 1909

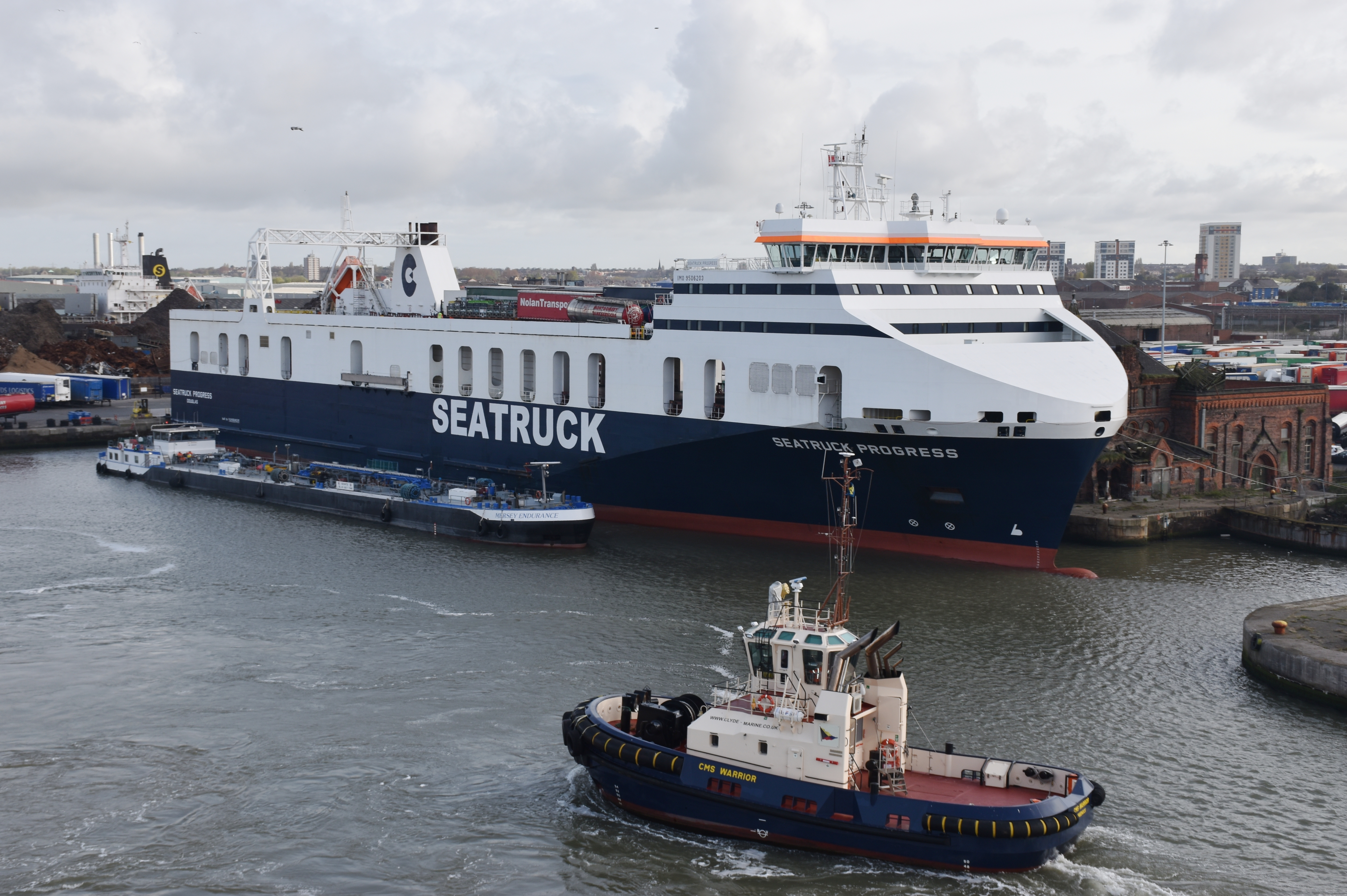
Langton Dock, 2017

Langton Dock is a dock on the River Mersey, England, and part of the Port of Liverpool. It is situated in the northern dock system in Bootle, connected to Alexandra Dock to the north and Brocklebank Dock to the south. Langton Dock locks provide a working connection to the river; one of the two remaining operational river entrances in the northern dock system.

== History ==
The dock was built by George Fosbery Lyster, and officially opened along with Alexandra Dock in 1881. The dock had been partially in use since 1879. It was named after William Langton, a member of the dock committee, and a former chairman of the Bank of Liverpool. As originally built, Langton Dock consisted of a basin adjoining the river wall, with a branch dock and two graving docks to the east. Access from the river was initially via Canada Basin.

The dock was intended for very large vessels of the time and was used for trading in the Mediterranean. Shipping companies, which used the dock, included Ellerman Lines and John Glynn.

Subsequent modifications were made to Langton Dock and the surrounding basins during the twentieth century to improve access. Between 1949 and 1962, this included the construction of the Langton River Entrance, which was eventually opened by Queen Elizabeth II on 14 December 1962, after being delayed by a series of problems.

The branch dock and graving docks were filled in, providing parking spaces for vehicles using the former Brocklebank Dock ferry terminal to Belfast, Northern Ireland. On the closure of the Pier Head's Princes Landing Stage, the remaining dock basin was occasionally used as terminal for the start of cruises, accommodating cruise ships. However, since the opening of the Liverpool cruise liner terminal in 2013, Langton Dock has ceased to berth cruise liners.

The Langton Dock Pump House is grade II listed and is on the Victorian Society's list of endangered buildings. The Pump House provided hydraulic power for the dock complex, and maintained water levels within the docks.

In common with some other Liverpool docks, Langton provided dockside accommodation for employees. An octagonal compound, containing seven separate houses built around a central courtyard, was built close to the narrower lock from Canada Basin into Langton Dock. Named Langton Buildings, it enabled key staff to be on hand at any time. There was also a staff flat upstairs in the Pump House.
