= Carriers' Dock =

Dock on the River Mersey in England

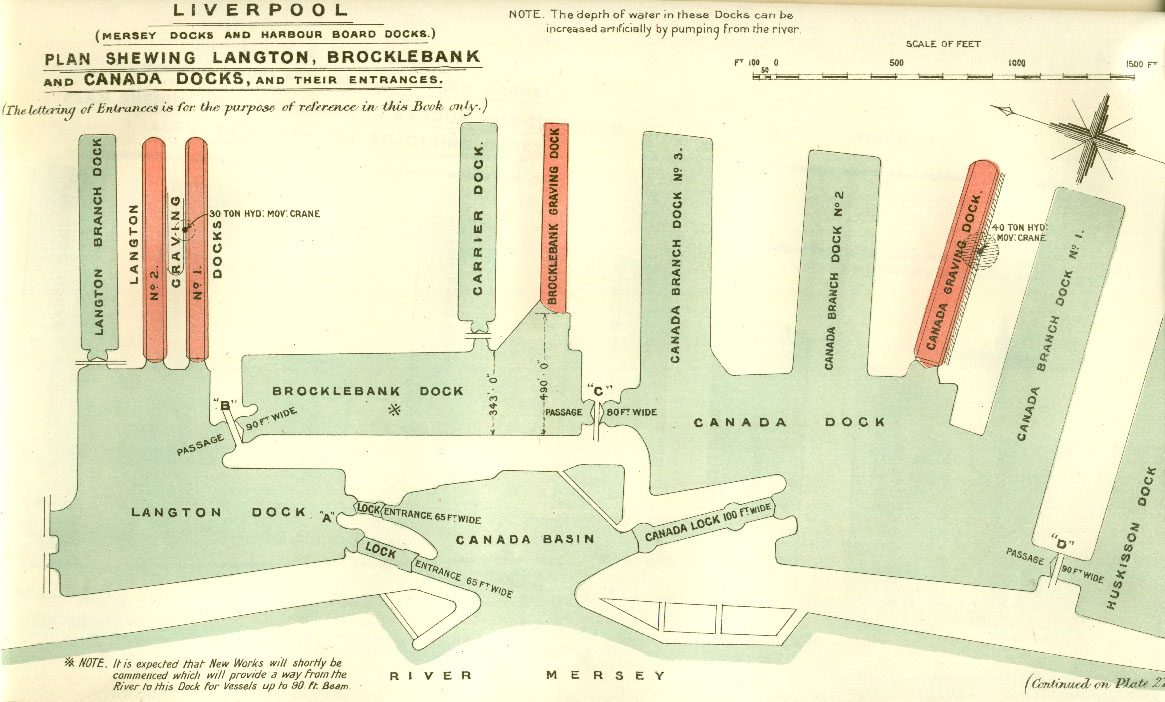
- British Empire Dockyards and Ports map of 1909, showing North Carriers' Dock as Carrier Dock. By 1909, South Carriers' Dock had been replaced by Brocklebank Graving Dock.

Location
- Location: Bootle, Merseyside, United Kingdom
- Coordinates: 53.4412°N 3.0031°W
- OS grid: SJ333943

Details
- Opened: 1862
- Closed: After September 1972
- Type: Wet dock
- Joins: Brocklebank Dock (former)
- Area: 2 acres (0.81 ha), 3,423 sq yd (2,862 m^{2})
- Width at entrance: 40 ft (12 m)
- Quay length: 641 yd (586 m)

Carriers' Dock (or North Carriers' Dock) was a dock on the River Mersey, England, and part of the Port of Liverpool. The dock was situated in the northern dock system and connected to Brocklebank Dock to the west.

== History ==
The dock was originally the northern of a pair of docks joining Brocklebank Dock, known as North Carriers' Dock and South Carriers' Dock. The docks were each 40 ft (12 m) wide at the entrance, and were intended for use by river goods carriers.

North Carriers' Dock was opened in 1862, with a basin covering 2 acres (0.81 ha), 3,423 sq yd (2,862 m^{2}) and with a total quayside of 641 yd (586 m). South Carriers' Dock had a basin covering 1 acre (0.40 ha), 4,515 sq yd (3,775 m^{2}) and with a total quayside of 615 yd (562 m).

The site of South Carriers' Dock was used for a graving dock in 1898.

From 15 May 1968 until 30 September 1972, the northern quayside of Carriers' Dock was used as a temporary terminal for the B&I Line, prior to the company using Trafalgar Dock, and for MD&HB cargo handling around the same time. The southern quayside of Carriers' Dock was a rough cargo berth.

North Carriers' Dock was filled in the late 20th century, and the site has been redeveloped.
