= Huskisson Dock =

British dock

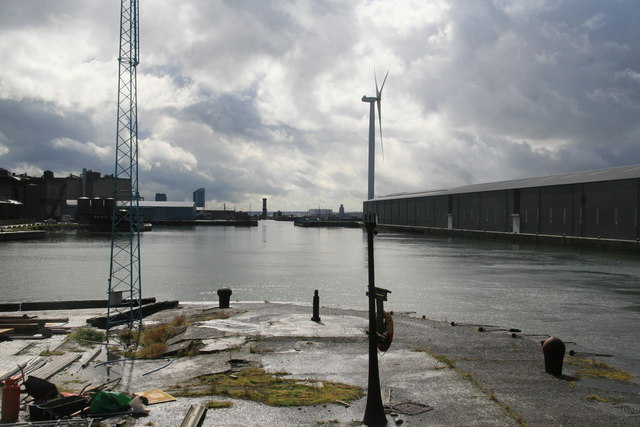
- Huskisson Dock seen from the north side

Location
- Location: Kirkdale, Liverpool, Merseyside, United Kingdom
- Coordinates: 53.4316°N 3.0052°W
- OS grid: SJ333932

Details
- Owner: The Peel Group
- Operator: Mersey Docks and Harbour Company
- Opened: 1852
- Type: Wet dock
- Joins: Canada Dock; Sandon Half Tide Dock
- Area: 15 acres (6.1 ha), 993 sq yd (830 m^{2})
- Width at entrance: 90 ft (27 m)
- Quay length: 1,122 yd (1,026 m)

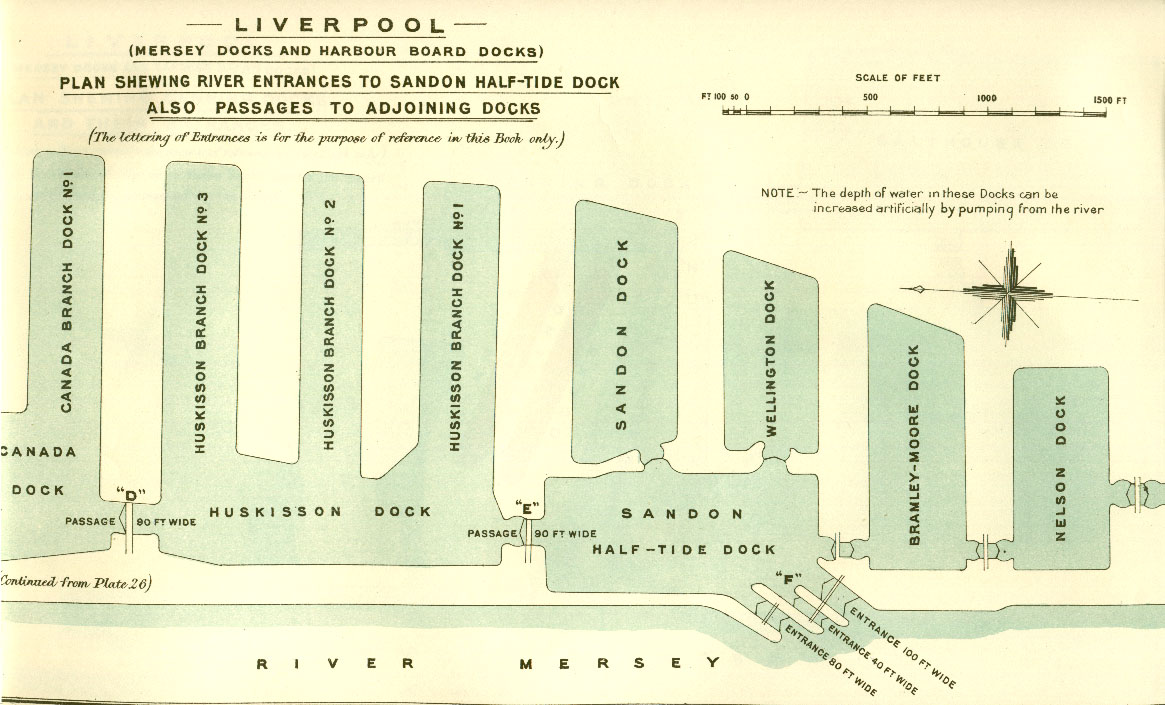
British Empire Dockyards and Ports, 1909

Huskisson Dock is a dock on the River Mersey, England, which forms part of the Port of Liverpool. It is situated in the northern dock system in Kirkdale. Huskisson Dock consists of a main basin nearest the river wall and two branch docks to the east. It is connected to Canada Dock to the north and Sandon Half Tide Dock to the south.

== History ==
The dock was designed by Jesse Hartley and opened in 1852. It is named after a former MP and Treasurer of the Navy, William Huskisson. Initially dealing in timber, it later traded in grain and provided berthing facilities for passenger ships on North American routes. The main basin was enlarged and a branch dock created in the 1860s to accommodate larger ships. The dock was expanded again at the turn of the twentieth century when two further branch docks were added by Anthony George Lyster.

=== RMS Lucania ===
After her last voyage was on 7 July 1909, the RMS Lucania, holder of the Blue Riband between 1894 and 1898, was laid up at the Huskisson Dock in Liverpool. On the evening of 14 August 1909, she was badly damaged by a fire. She was sunk at her berth in order to save her.

=== World War II ===
On 3 May 1941 Huskisson Branch Dock Number 2 was the site of the SS Malakand explosion during Liverpool's May Blitz, when 1,000 tons of explosives on board the ship were ignited during an air raid. Four people were killed and debris from the ship was strewn up to 2.5 miles away. The two ton anchor stock from the ship landed outside Bootle General Hospital, Derby Road, 1.5 miles from the scene.

=== Late 20th century ===
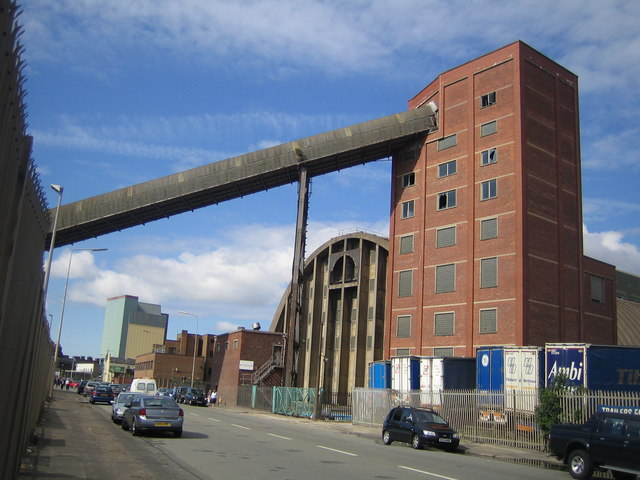
The conveyor to the sugar silo, and the silo beyond

Largely destroyed by the Malakand explosion, Huskisson Dock was rebuilt after the War. The Tate & Lyle Sugar Silo was built nearby, but on the opposite side of the Dock Road, and so was linked by an overhead conveyor.

Huskisson Branch Dock Number 2 was subsequently filled in and is now the site of a timber yard. Huskisson Dock remains in use, handling general bulk cargoes.

Up to the 1960s Cunard liners would berth mainly in Huskisson Dock.

Throughout the late 1970s the Nigerian 'river' ships (named after Nigerian rivers) were regular visitors to Huskisson Dock. The Nigerian sailors were veritable traders, loading locally purchased, second hand household appliances onto ships for sale in ports of call in Africa, en route to Nigeria.

== Impounding station ==
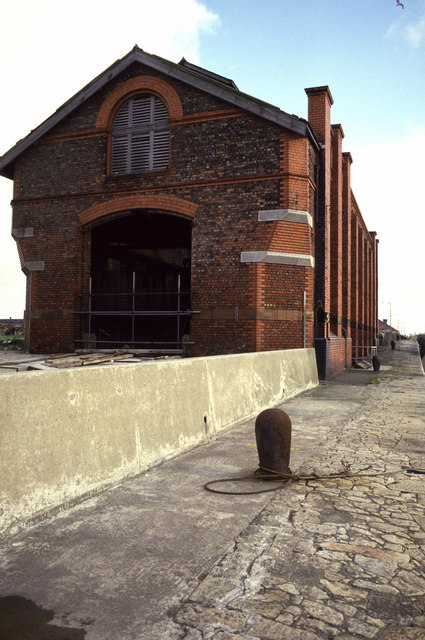
Huskisson Dock impounding station

The impounding station alongside Huskisson Dock was a pumping station used to maintain water levels in these 'floating' docks.
