= Custom House, Liverpool =

Building in Liverpool, England

Custom House
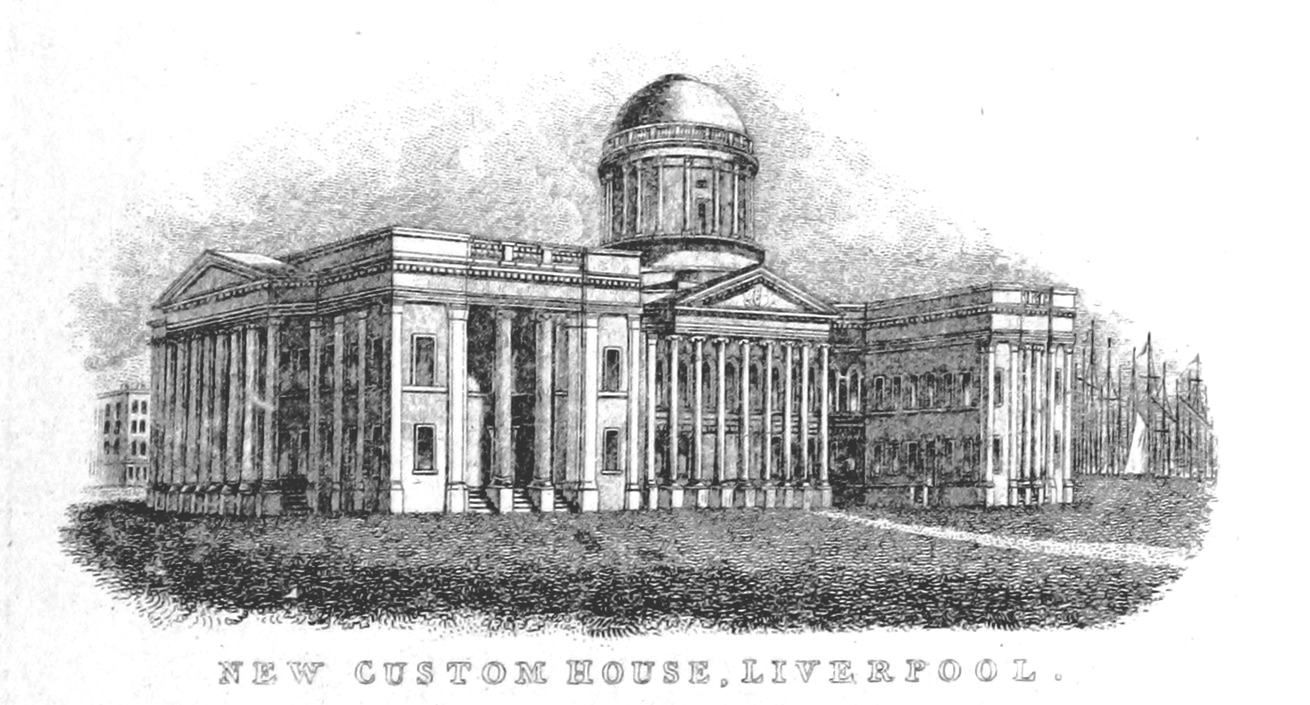
- Interactive map of the Custom House area

General information
- Status: Demolished
- Location: Liverpool, England
- Coordinates: 53.4024068°N 2.9885602°W
- Construction started: 1828
- Completed: 1839; 187 years ago
- Demolished: 1948; 78 years ago
- Cost: £230,000

Height
- Height: 127 ft (39 m)

Dimensions
- Diameter: 467 ft (142 m) x 253 ft (77 m)

The Custom House was a 19th-century Neo-classical building located in Liverpool, England. It housed a post office, dock office, and offices for Customs and Excise. It was built on the site of the historic Old Dock in 1839 and operated up to World War II when it was partly destroyed during the Liverpool Blitz, then finally demolished in 1948. Today the area which formed the base of the building makes up part of the Liverpool One shopping complex. It is considered amongst Liverpool's most regrettable losses when it comes to landmark buildings.

== History ==
Following the closure of the Old Dock on 31 August 1826, plans were made for the construction of what was to be Liverpool's fifth Custom house on the site which was filled in with concrete prior to construction. The town's surveyor, John Foster, who would later go on to design The Oratory and St James Cemetery, was charged with designing the H-shaped building located parallel to the shoreline. On 12 August 1828, the first stone was laid by Liverpool's mayor, Thomas Colley Porter, to mark the start of construction; this took 11 years, with the building opening in 1839.

In 1941, during World War II, the Custom House was hit with a bomb, partly destroying the building but ultimately leaving its structure intact. After the war had ended, the government (who owned the building) refused to repair the building despite protests, and it was subsequently demolished in 1948. Notably the building was a subject of a painting by John Atkinson Grimshaw.
