= Half tide dock =

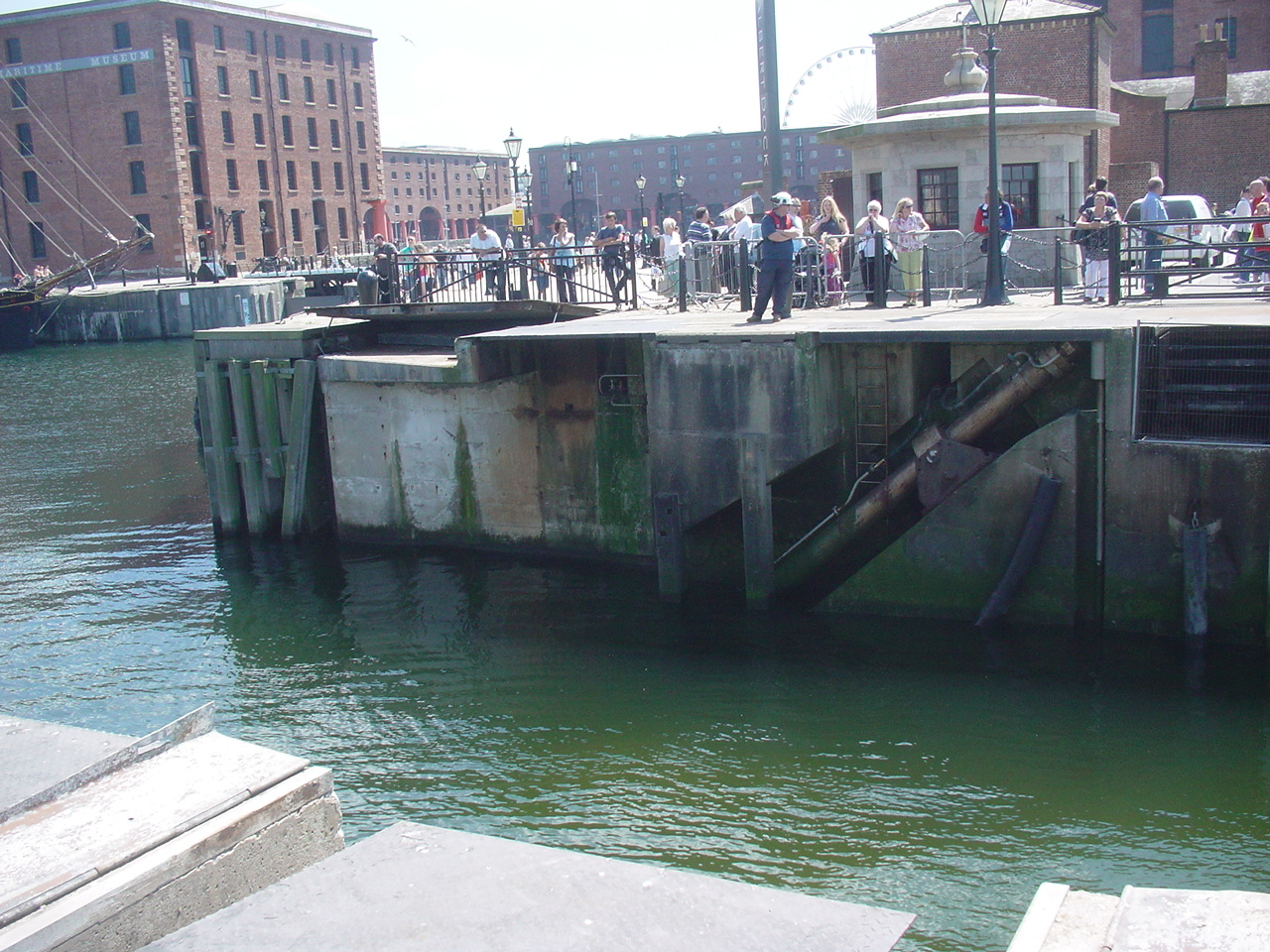
Canning Half Tide Dock, open to allow a ship to pass through

A half tide dock is a partially tidal dock. Typically the dock is entered at high tide. As the tide ebbs a sill or weir prevents the level dropping below a certain point, meaning that the ships in the dock remain afloat, although they still rise and fall with the tides above this. Half tide docks are particularly useful in areas with a large tidal range.

The sill of a half tide dock must be set sufficiently far below the daily high tide mark to allow ships to pass over it. Obviously this was easier to achieve with small ships of shallow draught, or in areas with a large tidal range. Inside the dock, the depth of water beneath the sill's level depends only on the depth to which the dock was excavated, although this obviously increases construction costs.

The importance of the sill, and the tide's height above it, is reflected by these dock sills becoming an important local datum level and for tide tables being calculated for heights above it (i.e. clear draught in and out of the dock). This importance has often continued for many years after the original sill had been replaced, as at Sharpness on the Severn Estuary, or where the dock had disappeared entirely, such as Old Dock Sill in Liverpool.

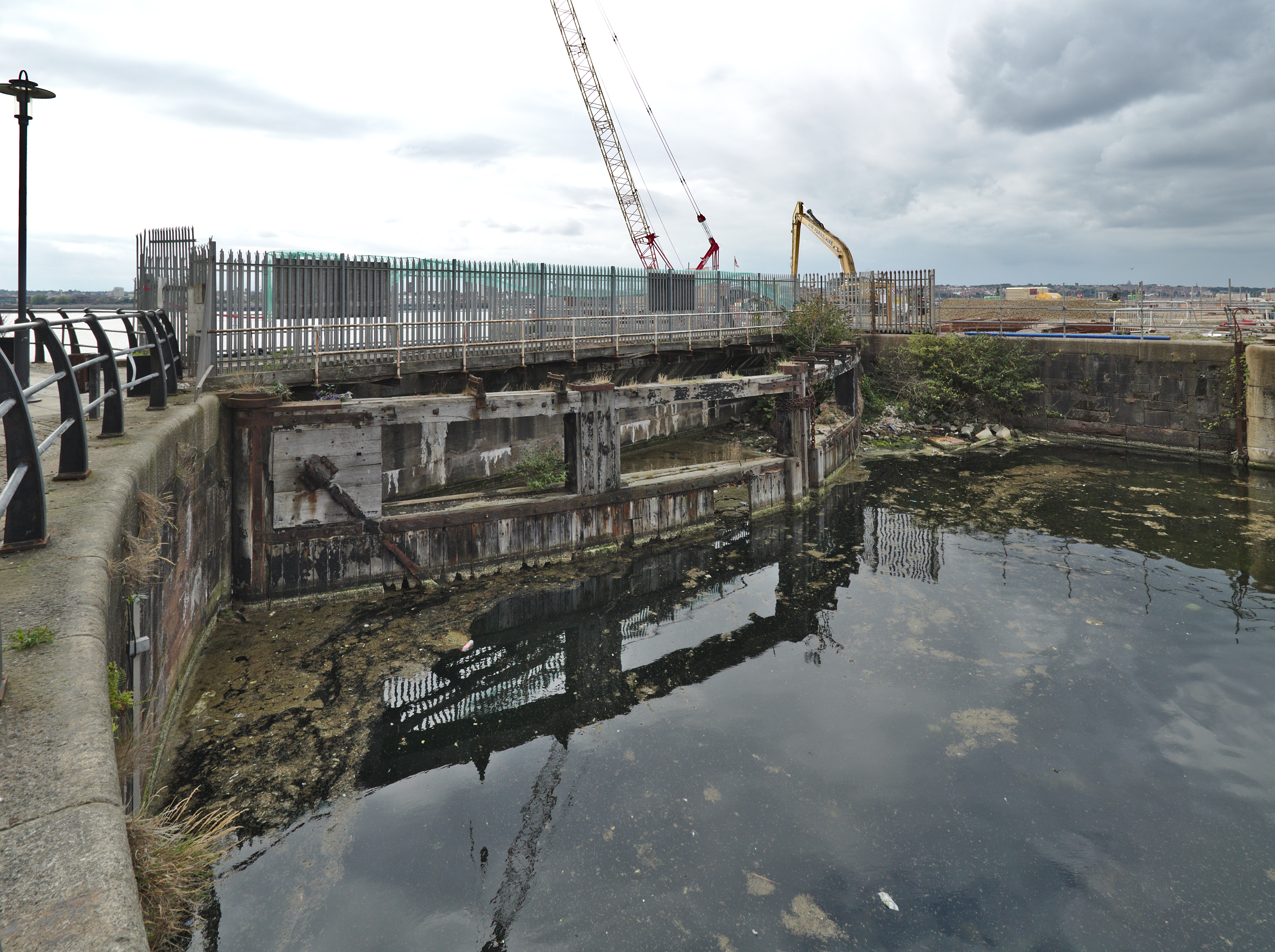
Princes Half Tide Dock gate (now permanently closed)

The River Mersey has a large tidal range, and many of the docks in Liverpool and Birkenhead are half-tide docks. One of these, Canning Dock, is undergoing significant development of its half-tide locks.

== A "gate-flap" half-tide dock ==
A modern refinement of the half-tide dock uses a "gate-flap", which replaces a fixed sill with a hinged flap that opens as the tide rises, and closes as the tide ebbs. When open, the gate-flap rests horizontally at the seabed level. Operation is usually hydraulic, with automatic control; and warning lights or alarms will indicate when the gate-flap is about to be lowered or raised. The advantage over the older fixed sill is that, when the gate-flap is down, there is greater draught available to boats as there is no sill providing an obstacle.

Such gate-flap systems are in place in Swansea, Padstow, Douglas, and Peel (the latter two in the Isle of Man).

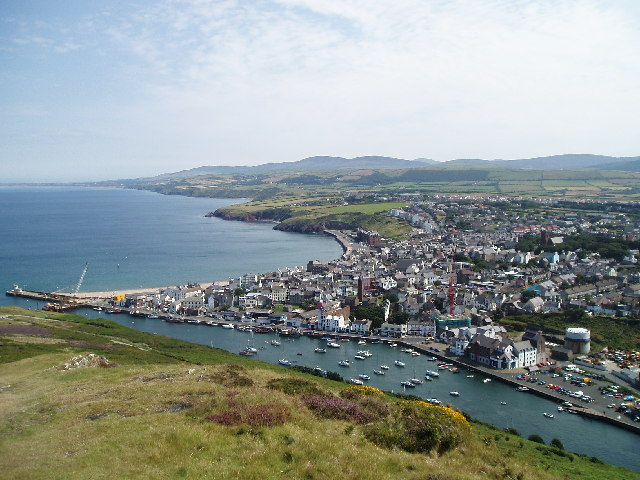
Peel inner harbour at high water (the gate-flap is at the extreme left).

== See also ==
- Floating dock, a dock where pumps, or incoming river flow, are used to maintain the docks at a high level.
