= Tate & Lyle Sugar Silo =

Listed building in Liverpool, England

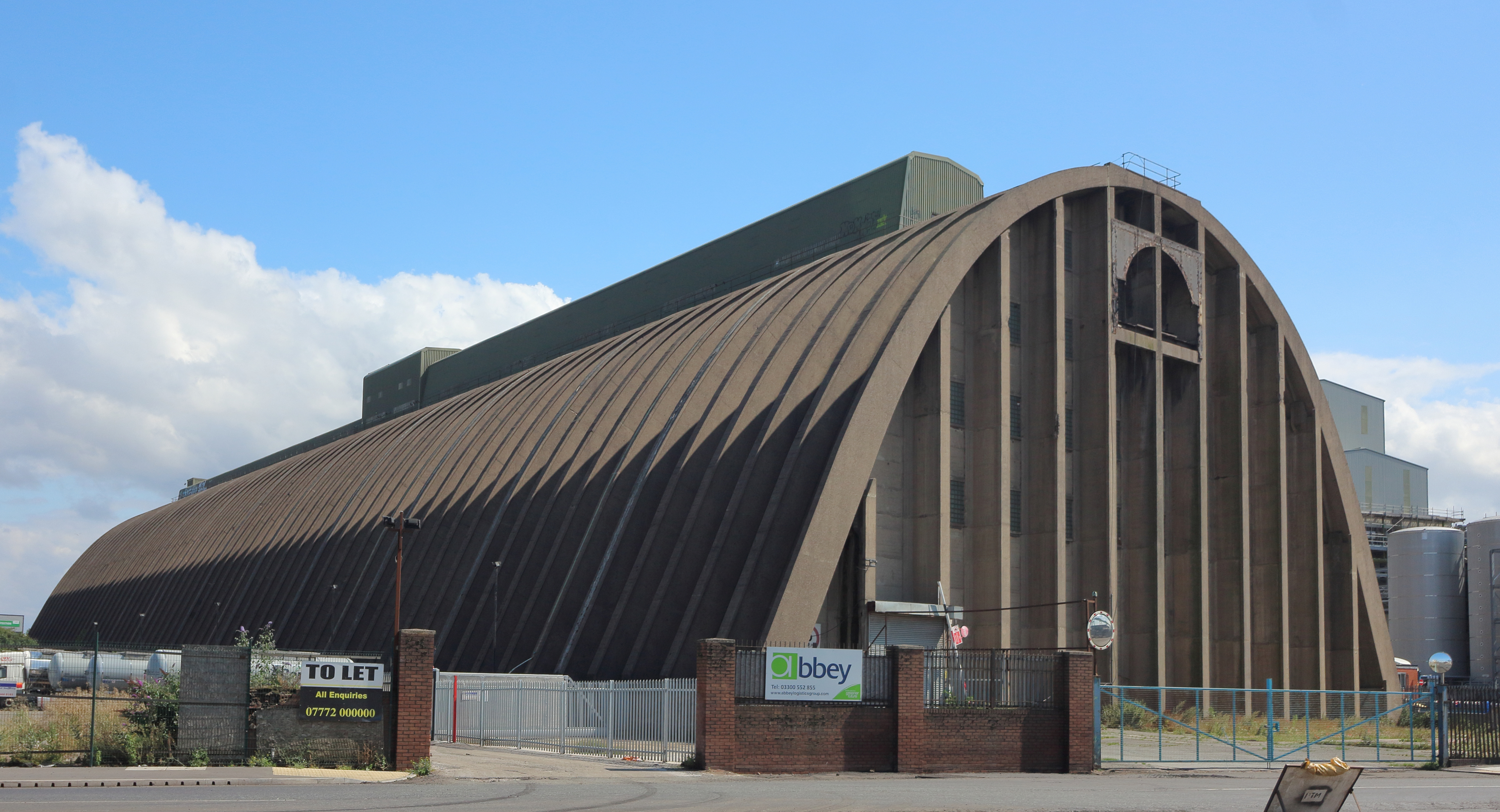
- The silo in 2019
- Interactive map of the Tate & Lyle Sugar Silo area

General information
- Location: Huskisson Dock, Kirkdale, Liverpool, England
- Coordinates: 53°26′02″N 2°59′47″W
- Year built: 1955–57

Design and construction
- Designations

Listed Building – Grade II*
- Official name: Sugar Silo
- Designated: 23 September 1992
- Reference no.: 1252955

The Tate & Lyle Sugar Silo is a Grade II* listed building on Regent Road at Huskisson Dock in Kirkdale, north Liverpool, England.

Henry Tate established his Liverpool refinery in 1872, and Tate & Lyle built their huge concrete sugar silo in the 1950s, close to the Liverpool docks with floor space of 85,000 square feet (7,900 m^{2}). A huge conveyor tower was constructed next to it, and this was used to bring sugar up from ships in Huskisson Dock. The sugar was then transported via several other conveyors into the top of the silo.

Once in the silo, an overhead railway system was used to distribute the sugar along the length of the silo. The hopper ran along on a track, depositing the sugar through large grilles positioned between the rails. In 2009, the silo tower was in a state of disrepair, and was on the Buildings at Risk Register, although as of 2022, it no longer features there. The silo itself is still used.

== See also ==
- Grade II* listed buildings in Liverpool – Suburbs
