= Old Dock =

World's first wet dock, in Liverpool, England

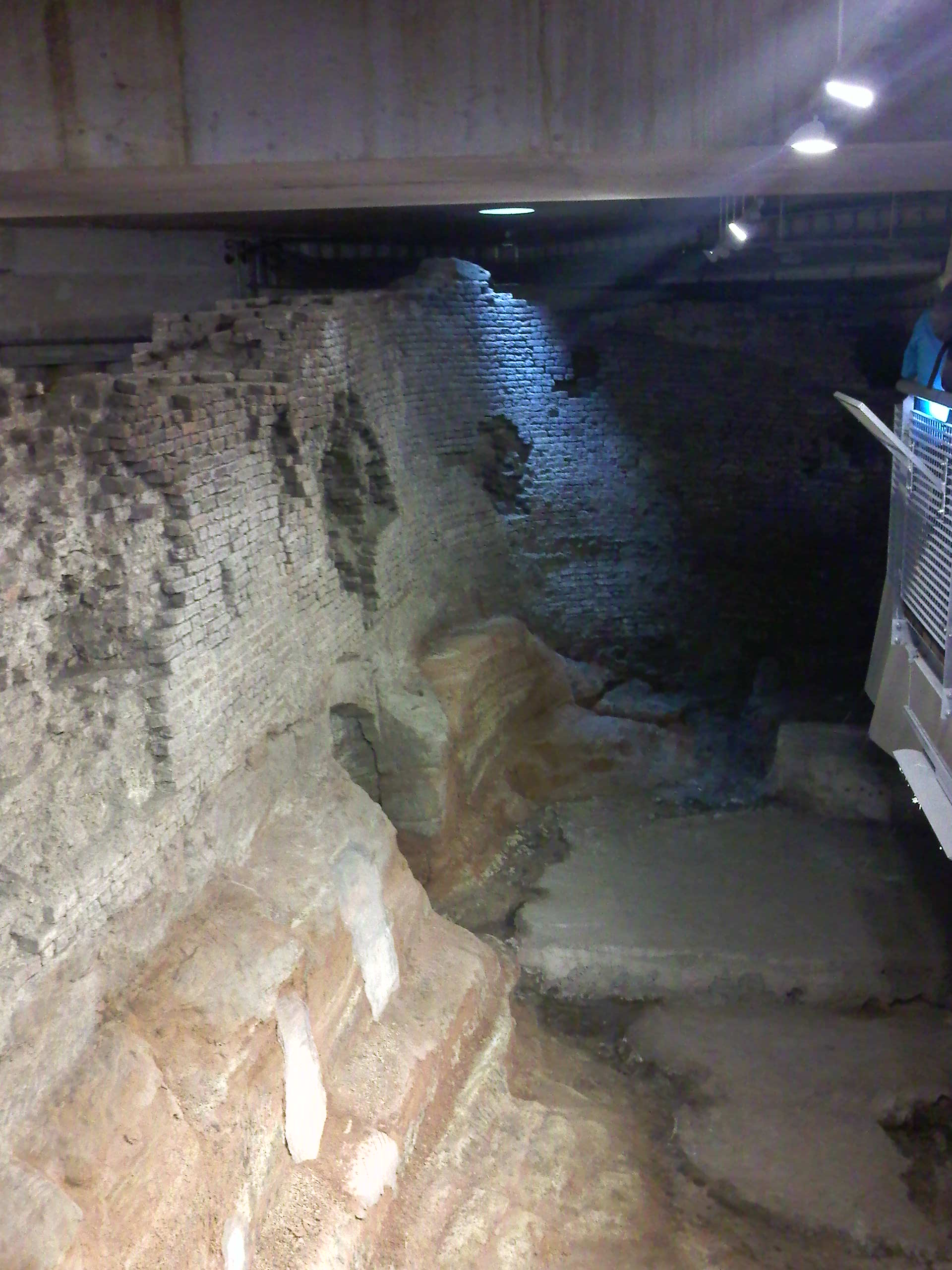
- Old Dock wall in 2012

Location
- Location: Liverpool, United Kingdom
- Coordinates: 53.4025°N 2.9886°W
- OS grid: SJ342900

Details
- Owner: Grosvenor Group (site)
- Opened: 31 August 1715
- Closed: 31 August 1826
- Type: Wet dock
- Area: 3 1/2 acres (1.4 ha)

The Old Dock, originally known as Thomas Steers' dock, was the world's first commercial wet dock. The 3 1/2 acres (1.4 ha) dock was built on the River Mersey in Liverpool, England, starting in 1710 and completed in 1716. It was built on the site of the Pool, a natural tidal pool off the River Mersey, by partially filling and locking it in from the river with quay walls erected.

== History ==
The Old Dock was built at a cost of £12,000 and opened on 31 August 1715. Thomas Steers was the engineer responsible; and additional advice was obtained from George Sorocold. Originally a tidal basin was accessed directly from the river, and from 1737 access was via Canning Dock. The dock was built with one graving dock; a second and third graving dock were added in 1746 and the 1750s. The dock walls were constructed from brick laid directly on to sandstone bedrock. The dock gates would have allowed as much as 10% of the water out between high tides, resulting in a water level drop of several feet. This may have been offset by water entering the dock from a stream. It accommodated up to 100 ships.

Although Liverpool vessels were involved in the slave trade before the dock opened, the Liverpool Merchant sailing for Africa on the 16 Oct 1699, and selling 220 slaves in Barbados in 1700, a second 30 tonne vessel being recorded as sailing for Africa in 1709, it would have served ships involved in the Africa-America trade, propelling Liverpool to world leader of this trade.

The dock led to Liverpool's establishment as the leading European port and subsequent world trading port.

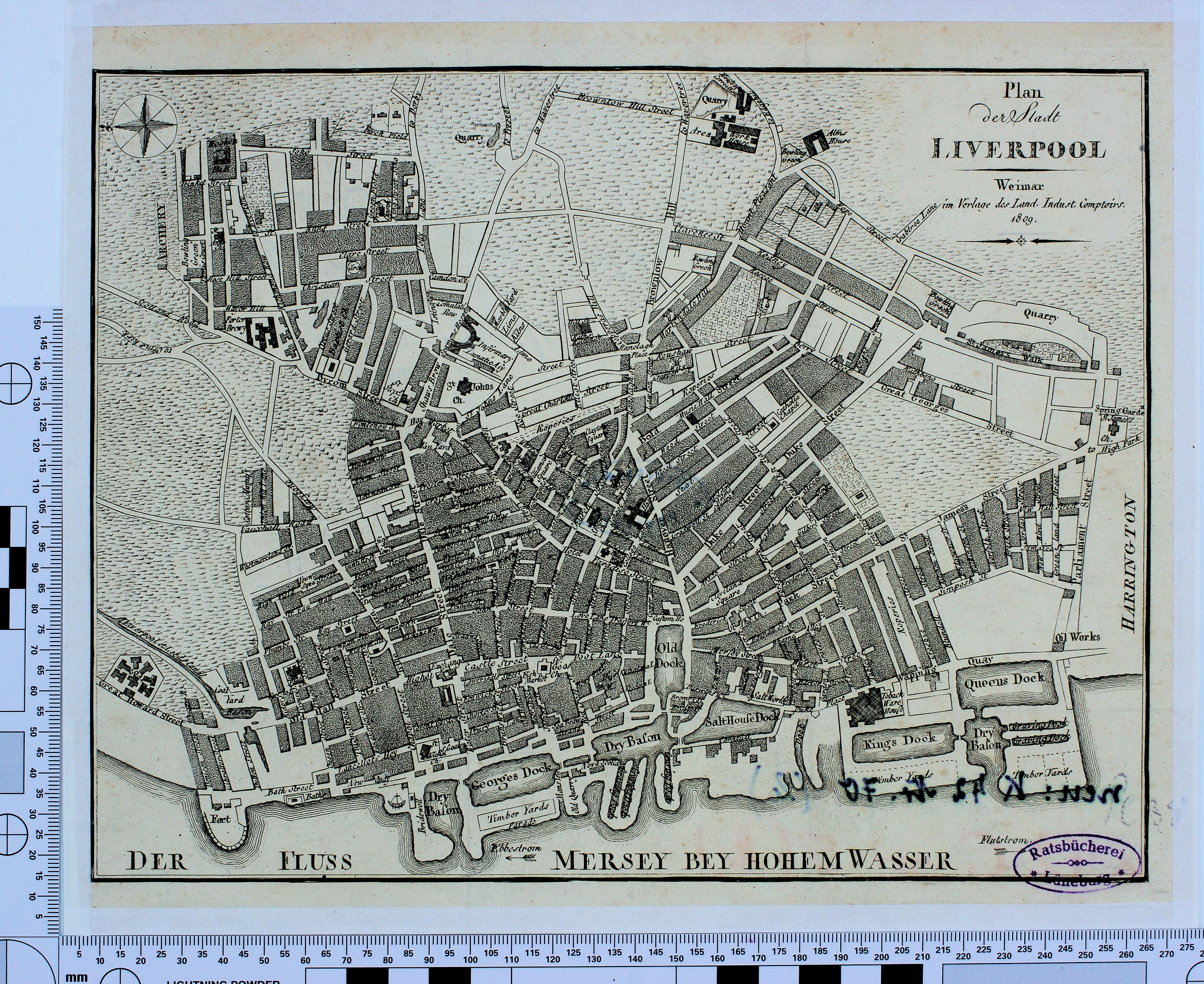
Map of Liverpool in 1809 showing the Old Dock

== Redevelopment ==
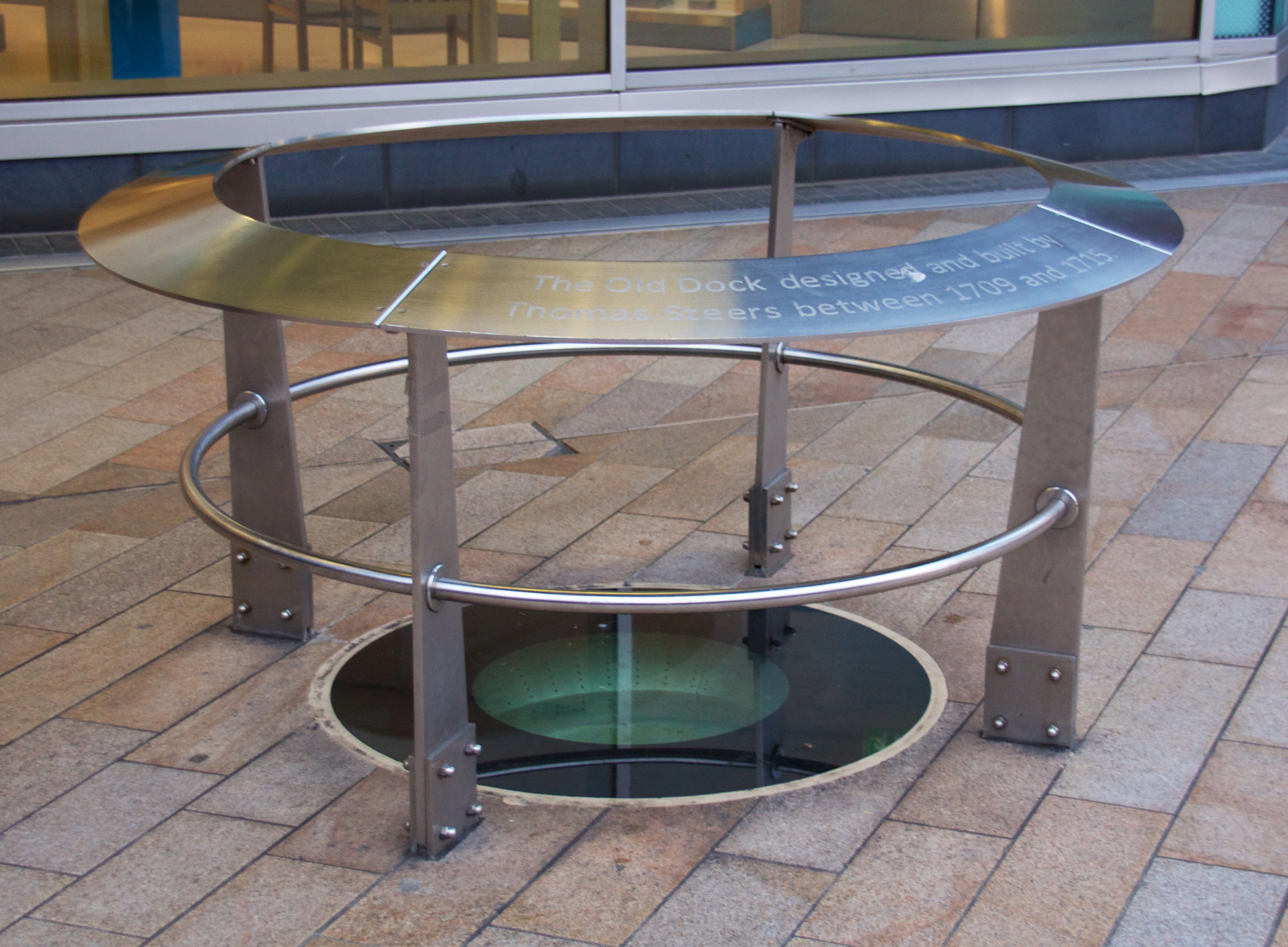
Viewing window to the Old Dock

In the early 19th century, the dock was considered too small for the growing size of shipping using the port; the quays were too narrow; the city's sewage polluted the dock's water; and the narrow wooden drawbridge across its entrance channel caused traffic jams. Sentiment saved the Old Dock for 20 years, but the Old Dock closed on 31 August 1826 and was filled in. Liverpool’s fourth Custom House, designed by John Foster, was built on the site between 1828 and 1837, and was demolished after severe bomb damage during the Battle of Britain (World War II).

In 1999 an office block on the site, Steers House, was demolished, and the resulting waste ground was used as an NCP car park until 2004, when the site was incorporated into the Liverpool One shopping development. A water feature has been built on the site of Old Dock to commemorate its history. A portion of the dock wall is exposed in the basement of the new development, and can be viewed from the pavement above through a viewing window in the ground. The excavated site was opened to the public in May 2010. Tours of the Old Dock are currently operated by National Museums Liverpool on a weekly basis.

== Media ==
The excavation of the dock featured in a Time Team Special episode, first broadcast on Channel 4 on Monday 21 April 2008.

== Old Dock Sill ==
The level of the sill of its entrance is used in and around Liverpool as a height datum called Old Dock Sill or ODS.
