= Branch dock =

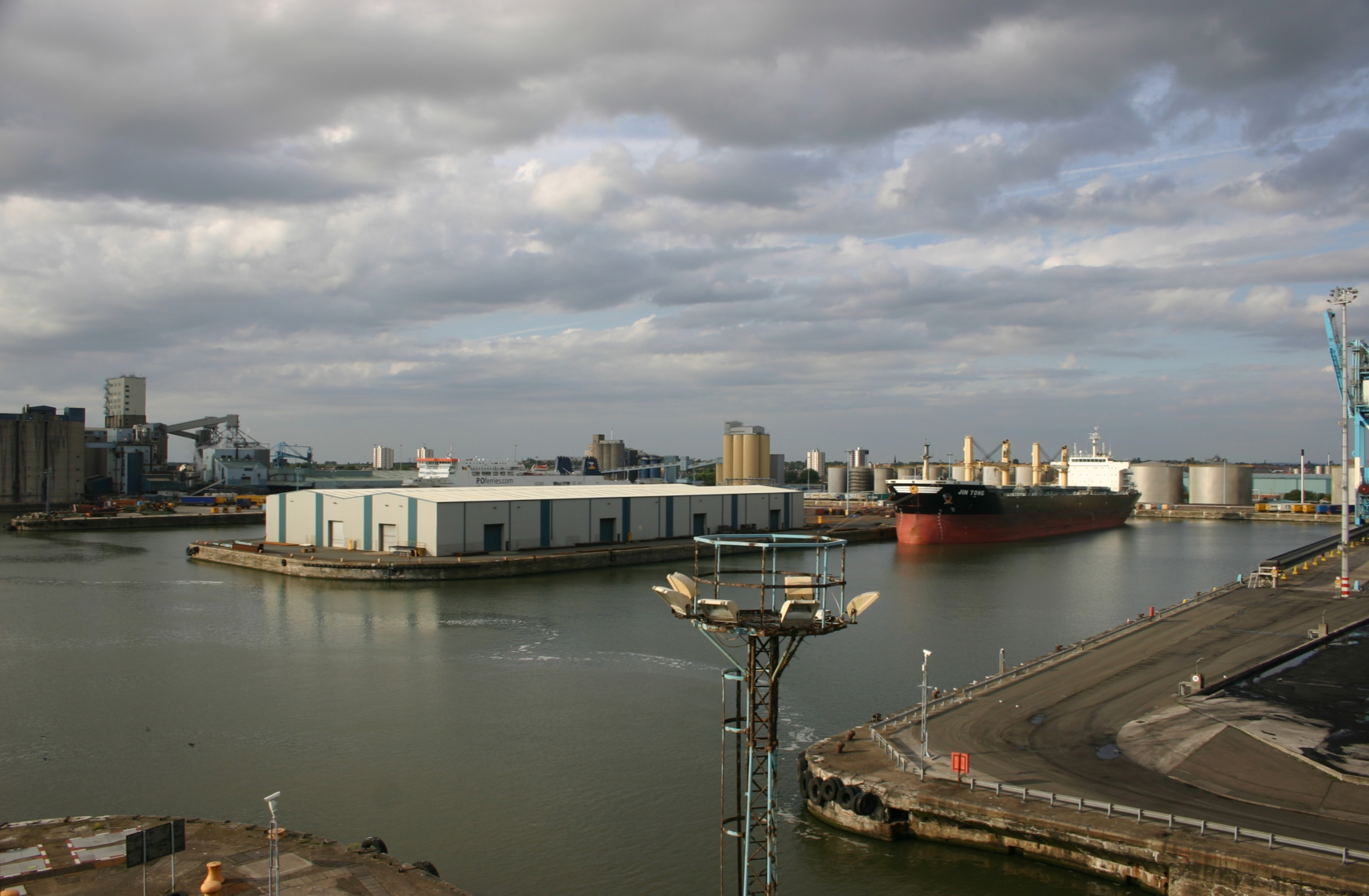
Gladstone Dock, Liverpool. Gladstone Dock in the foreground, with branch docks 1,2 & 3 (a former graving dock) from right to left.

A branch dock is a dock that forms part of a large harbour system of interlinked docks.

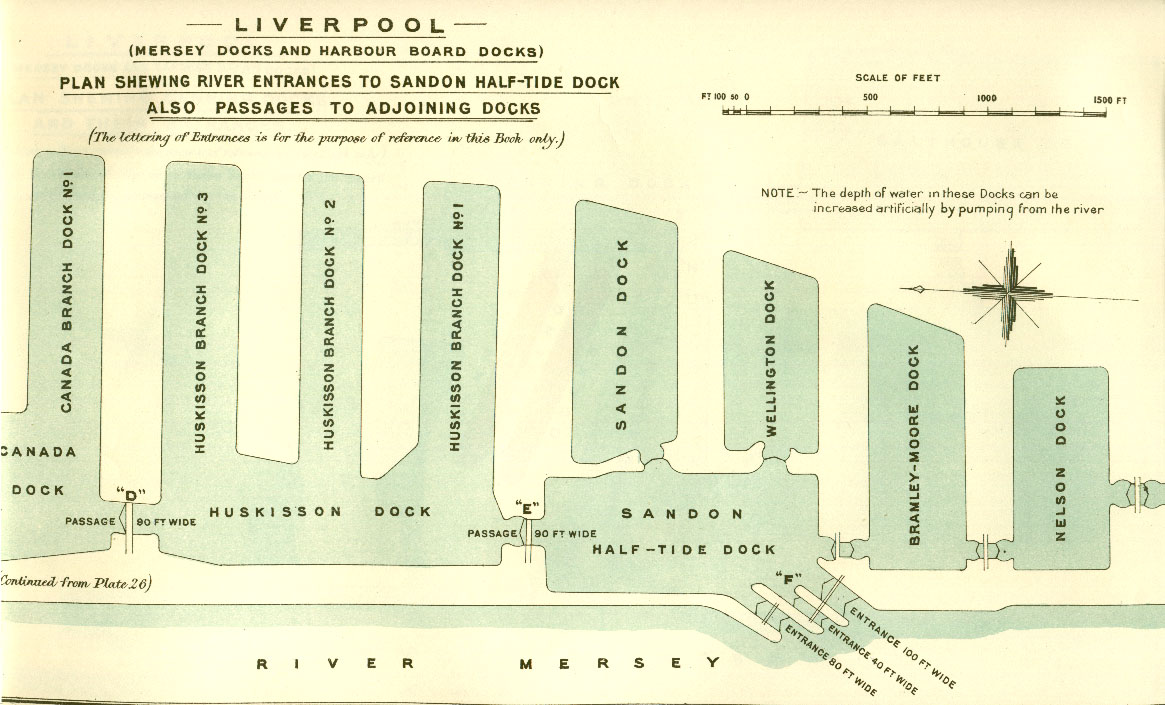
Part of Liverpool's docks, showing Huskisson Dock and its three branches to the left, with Sandon Dock and its isolated basins at centre-right

Branch docks are terminal branches of a main floating dock. They are not isolated from the main dock by gates or locks and they share the same water level. Where docks join other docks or basins through gates, these are usually given a distinct name rather than being termed a 'branch'. Floating docks that are separated from tidal waters by a half tide dock commonly have related names such as Sandon Dock and Sandon Half Tide Dock. Branch docks are usually numbered, following the name of their main dock, i.e. 'Gladstone Number Three Branch Dock', rather than individually named.

The purpose of a branch dock is to increase the quayside frontage and space for warehouses, for a given volume of water, (Note: The cost of excavation for a dock is roughly proportional to its volume.) and without requiring the cost and complexity of more locks.

Branch docks first appeared in the 18th century, but their heyday was in the middle of the 19th century when major Victorian port cities such as Liverpool were constructing their dock systems. Complex floating harbours were being built that allowed more ships to enter or leave on each tide. The increased number of ships required more space for loading than a simple rectangular dock

When ships began to increase in size after World War II and cargo began to be handled by either bulk carriers or containers, the need for warehouses at docks was reduced. Many older docks became obsolete and were closed in the 1970s and 1980s. These branch docks were often infilled to create more land within the dock complex; either to provide parking and marshalling space for container trucks, or to build new dock features such as specialist bulk loading facilities or other ancillaries. (Note: The infilled Sandon Dock now contains a sewage plant.)
