= Floating dock (impounded) =

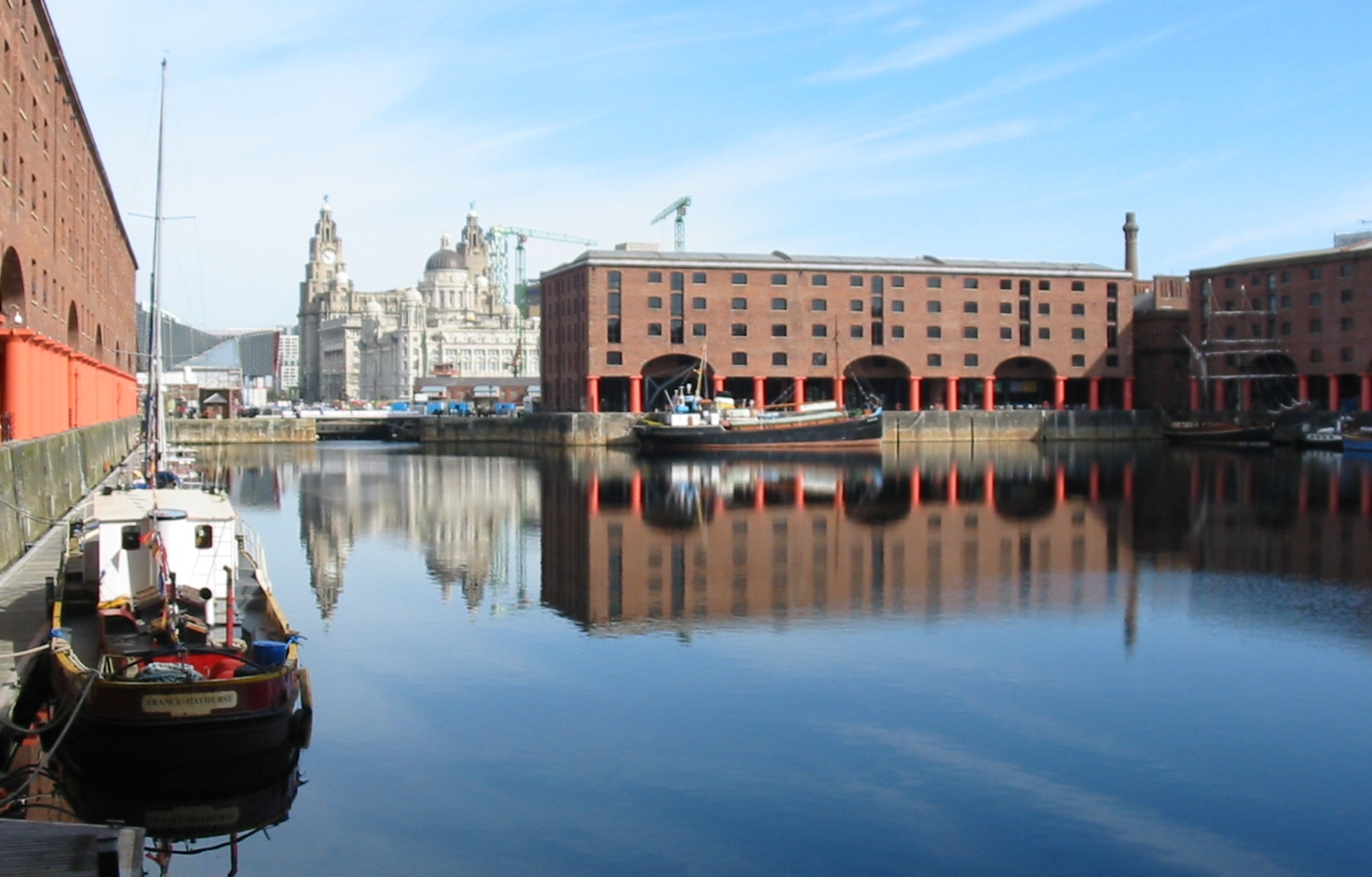
Albert Dock in Liverpool, one of the most developed Victorian dock and warehouse complexes

A floating dock, floating harbour or wet dock is a dock alongside a tidal waterway which maintains a 'constant' level, despite the changing tides.

== Operation ==
At the most basic level, a floating dock is isolated from tidal water by a lock gate, at least, although in many dock systems the entrance is more complex than this.

== Development and early docks ==
=== London ===
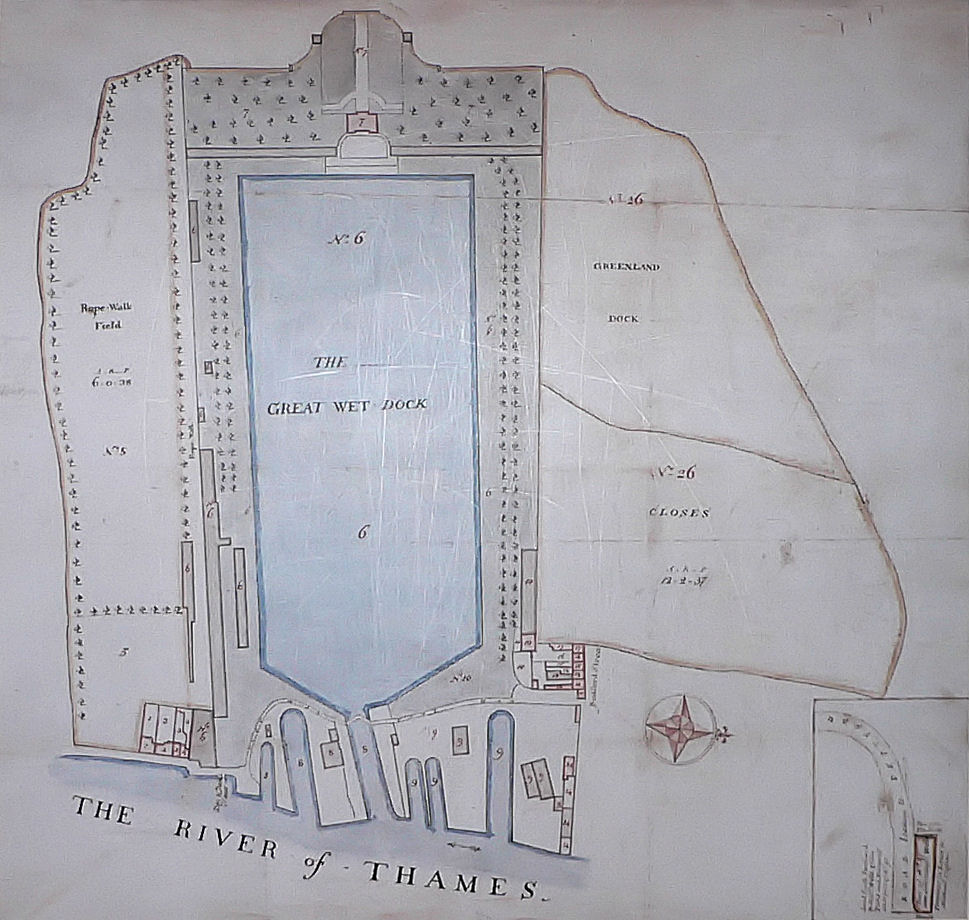
Howland's Wet Dock

The first wet dock was Howland Great Wet Dock or Greenland Dock, built in London at the end of the 17th century. This was not a commercial dock and had no warehouses, but was intended solely for ship replenishment and refitting.

=== Liverpool (Old Dock) ===
In 1715 the first commercial wet dock, Liverpool's Old Dock, opened. Early docks were of simple construction: a single lock gate isolating them from the tidal water. The gates were opened during the last hour [or two] of the rising tide, giving a short window of opportunity to let ships in on the rise and releasing outgoing ships while the tide was on the turn. The gates were closed at top of tide to maintain levels within the dock. Although this short opening period may have seemed disruptive, any attempt at longer opening might allow dock water-level to fall with the ebbing tide thus interfering with the wharf-side level of every ship in the basin.

A half tide dock is a partially tidal dock. They need have no gate, but as the tide ebbs a raised sill or weir on the floor of the dock prevents the level dropping below a certain point, meaning that the ships in the dock remain afloat, although they still fall with the first ebb of the tide. Half tide docks were only useful for ships of shallow draught, in areas with a large tidal range. The tide must rise sufficiently to give them a clear passage over the raised sill.

=== Hull ===
In 1775 Hull's Old Dock was opened. This was the first commercial floating dock, isolated by a lock rather than a single lock gate. This allowed the dock's water level to be maintained and, more importantly, it increased the time for which tidal access was possible. However the lock was only 121 ft long and this limited the number of ships passing through it.

=== Bristol ===
One of the first large fully floating docks was that of Bristol's Floating Harbour, built in 1809 to a plan by William Jessop. This involved the diversion of the River Avon (Bristol) away from its previous route through the harbour and into a new channel at the New Cut. Entrance to the harbour was now gained through an entrance basin, at what is now Cumberland Basin. Although linked by locks to the harbour and the river, the intention was that the basin would itself be used as an entrance lock: rather than locking each ship through one-by-one, ships could wait for the tide inside the basin and then the outer lock gates could both be opened allowing all to leave and arrive together. For a port with such a convoluted and tide-dependent approach as Bristol's, any easing of access was valuable.

As the harbour now need never be connected directly to the tidal waters, its water level could be held constant, without even the small variation of the hours around high tide. At Bristol, Jessop controlled the height of the harbour water by a broad weir, built as a dam across the previous route of the river. Levels were maintained by the flow of the small River Frome which still flowed into the harbour.

=== Liverpool ===
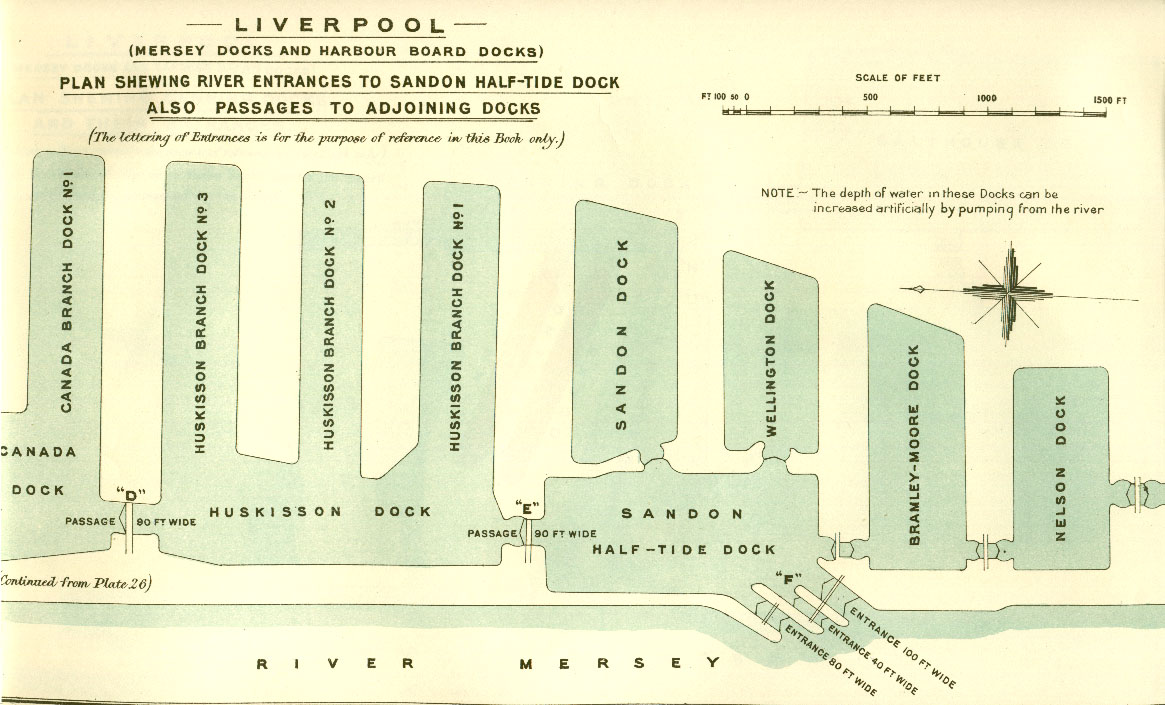
Liverpool's floating Huskisson Dock, fronted by the Sandon Half Tide Dock

As one of the first industrialised ports, Liverpool was at the forefront of dock development from the early 18th century. A network of inter-linked docks developed along the length of the River Mersey shoreline. These were floating docks, with access through a number of tidal basins and half tide docks. Ships could move through the interlinked docks 24 hours a day without moving into the tidal River Mersey, which would necessitate a pilot.

== Impounding ==
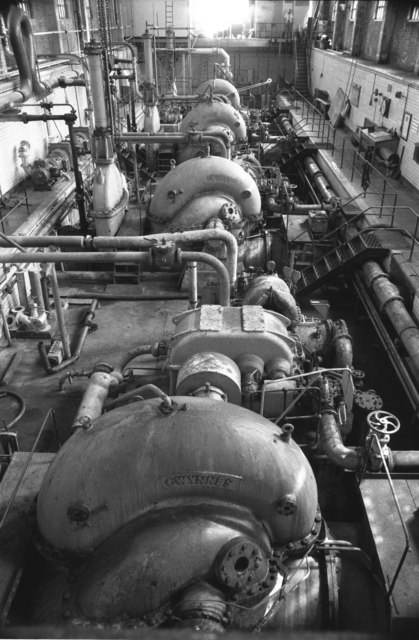
Pumps within Wallasey Dock impounding station

Floating docks are generally maintained at a level at least as high as the highest tide. Apart from any considerations of navigation, lock gates are usually arranged as a chevron. (Note: Where the dock is lower than the tide, other forms of lock gate must be used, such as caissons.) and can only hold back higher water in one direction, which must always be from within the dock. A small but significant example of this is the locking system on the River Darent in Dartford, now in restoration and which were fully operational between 1899 and 1983.

Maintaining this higher level requires a supply of water. In some cases this is available from a river flowing into the harbour. This was the case for Bristol, at least initially, with the River Frome. Where there was no such river source, a mechanical pumping, or impounding, station was constructed. Liverpool's northern docks were served by one at Huskisson Dock and one on the opposite side of the Mersey for Wallasey Dock.

Bow Locks in East London has used a bi-directional system since the year 2000 permitting boats to transfer between the tidal Bow Creek and Limehouse Cut. Bow Locks permits transfer near top of tide whether it be neap or spring. Generally inbounds enter on the rise and outbounds on the fall. In practical use, the operation of Bow Locks is tightly controlled by the duty lock-keeper as every tide is different.

== See also ==
- Branch dock, a continuous basin within a dock, provided greater wharf frontage.
- Half tide dock, a simpler version, where a fixed sill retains some water within the dock to allow ships to float, but at varying height.
- Jesse Hartley, civil engineer who made many innovations in floating docks
