= Dock =

Human-made structure involved in the handling of boats or ships

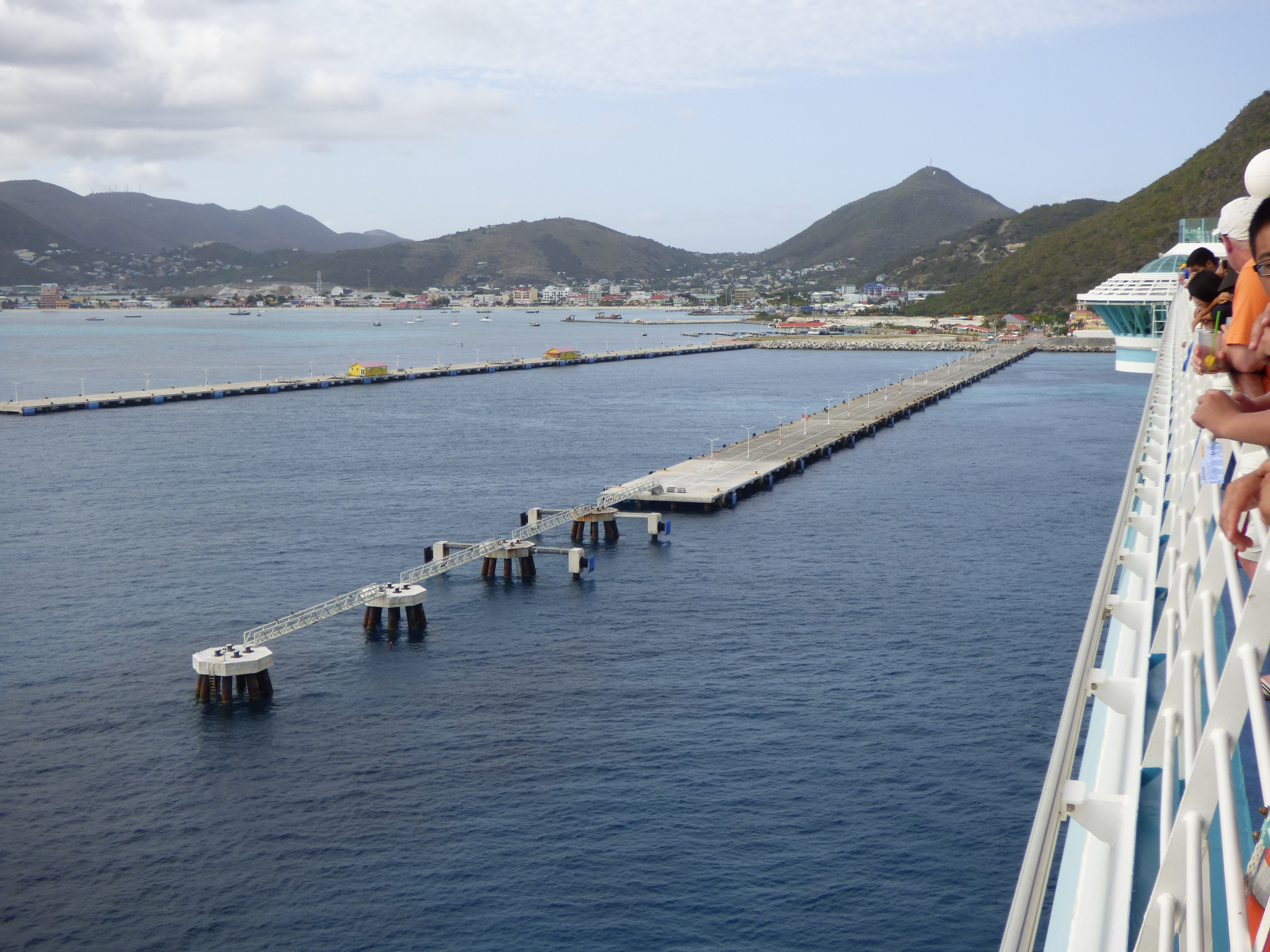
Dock for cruise ships in Sint Maarten in the Caribbean

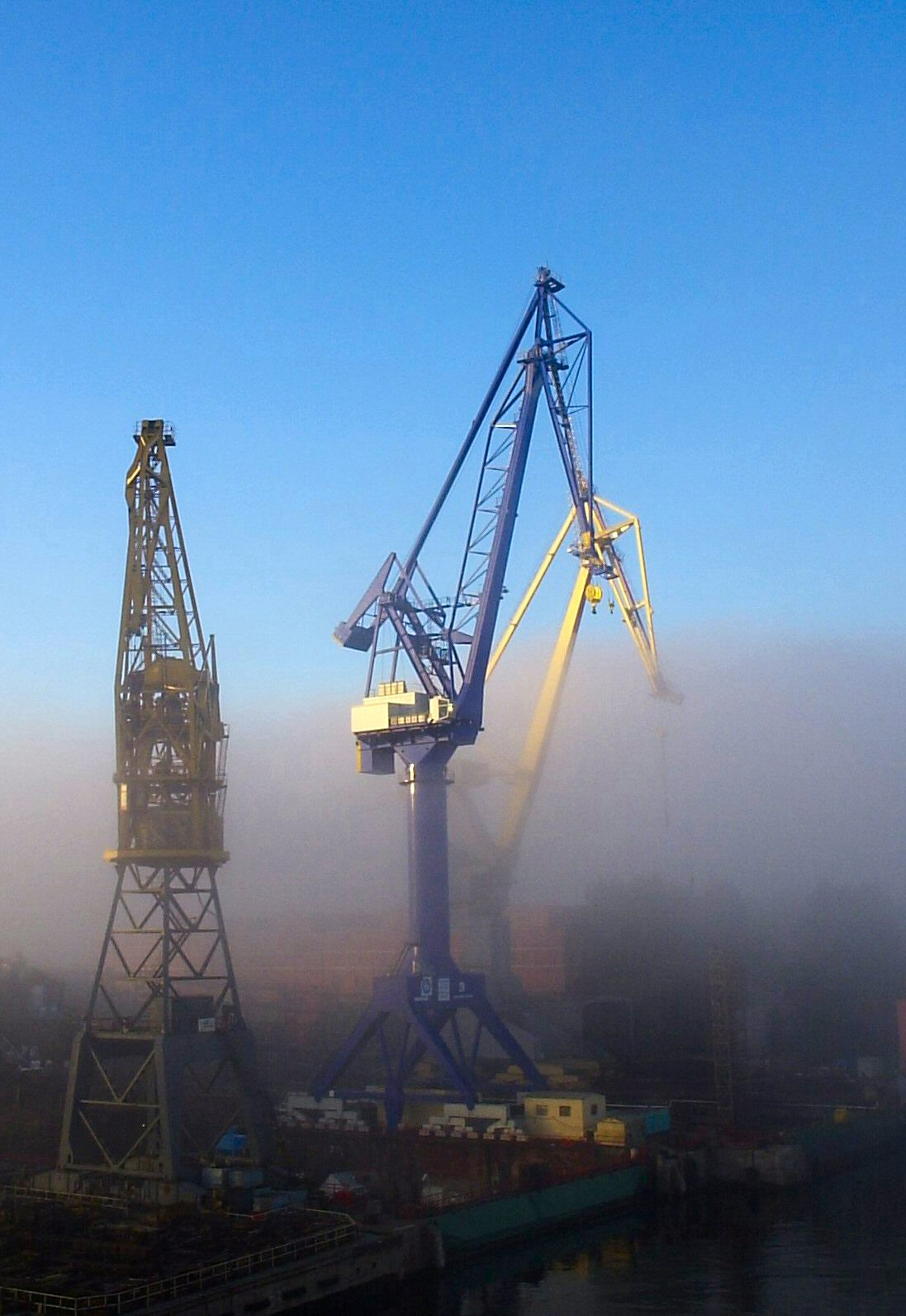
Docks in St. Petersburg, Russia

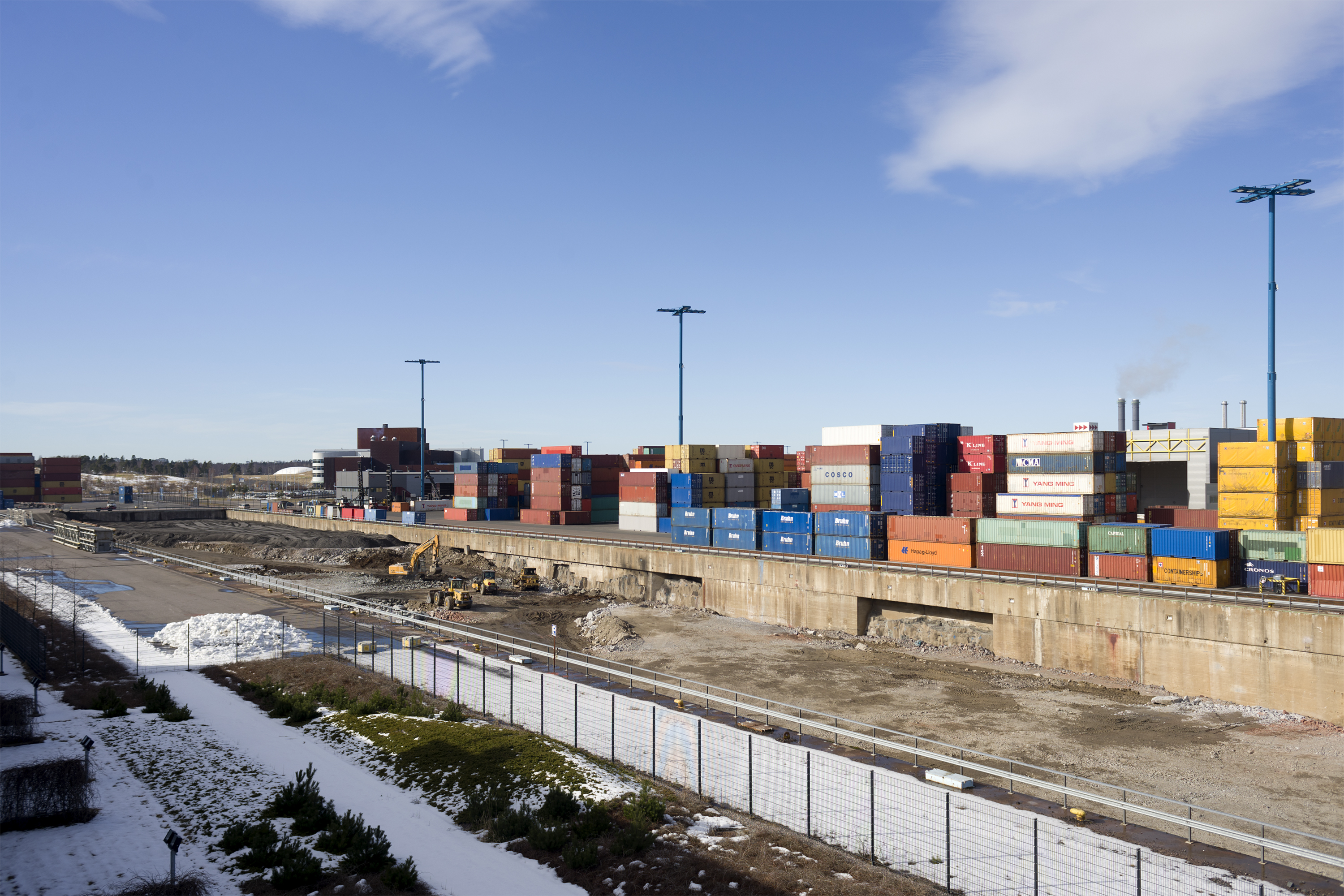
Partially backfilled dry dock of the former Valmet Vuosaari Shipyard in Vuosaari, Helsinki, Finland

The word dock (from Dutch dok) in American English refers to one or a group of human-made structures that are involved in the handling of boats or ships (usually on or near a shore). In British English, the term is not used the same way as in American English; it is used to mean the area of water that is next to or around a wharf or quay. The exact meaning varies among different variants of the English language.

"Dock" may also refer to a dockyard (also known as a shipyard) where the loading, unloading, building, or repairing of ships occurs.

== History ==
The earliest known docks were those discovered in Wadi al-Jarf, an ancient Egyptian harbor, of Pharaoh Khufu, dating from c. 2500 BC located on the Red Sea coast. Archaeologists also discovered anchors and storage jars near the site.

A dock from Lothal in India dates from 2400 BC and was located away from the main current to avoid deposition of silt. Modern oceanographers have observed that the ancient Harappans must have possessed great knowledge relating to tides in order to build such a dock on the ever-shifting course of the Sabarmati, as well as exemplary hydrography and maritime engineering. This is the earliest known dock found in the world equipped to berth and service ships.

It is speculated that Lothal engineers studied tidal movements and their effects on brick-built structures, since the walls are of kiln-burnt bricks. This knowledge also enabled them to select Lothal's location in the first place, as the Gulf of Khambhat has the highest tidal amplitude and ships can be sluiced through flow tides in the river estuary. The engineers built a trapezoidal structure, with north–south arms of average 21.8 metres (71.5 ft), and east–west arms of 37 metres (121 ft).

== British English ==
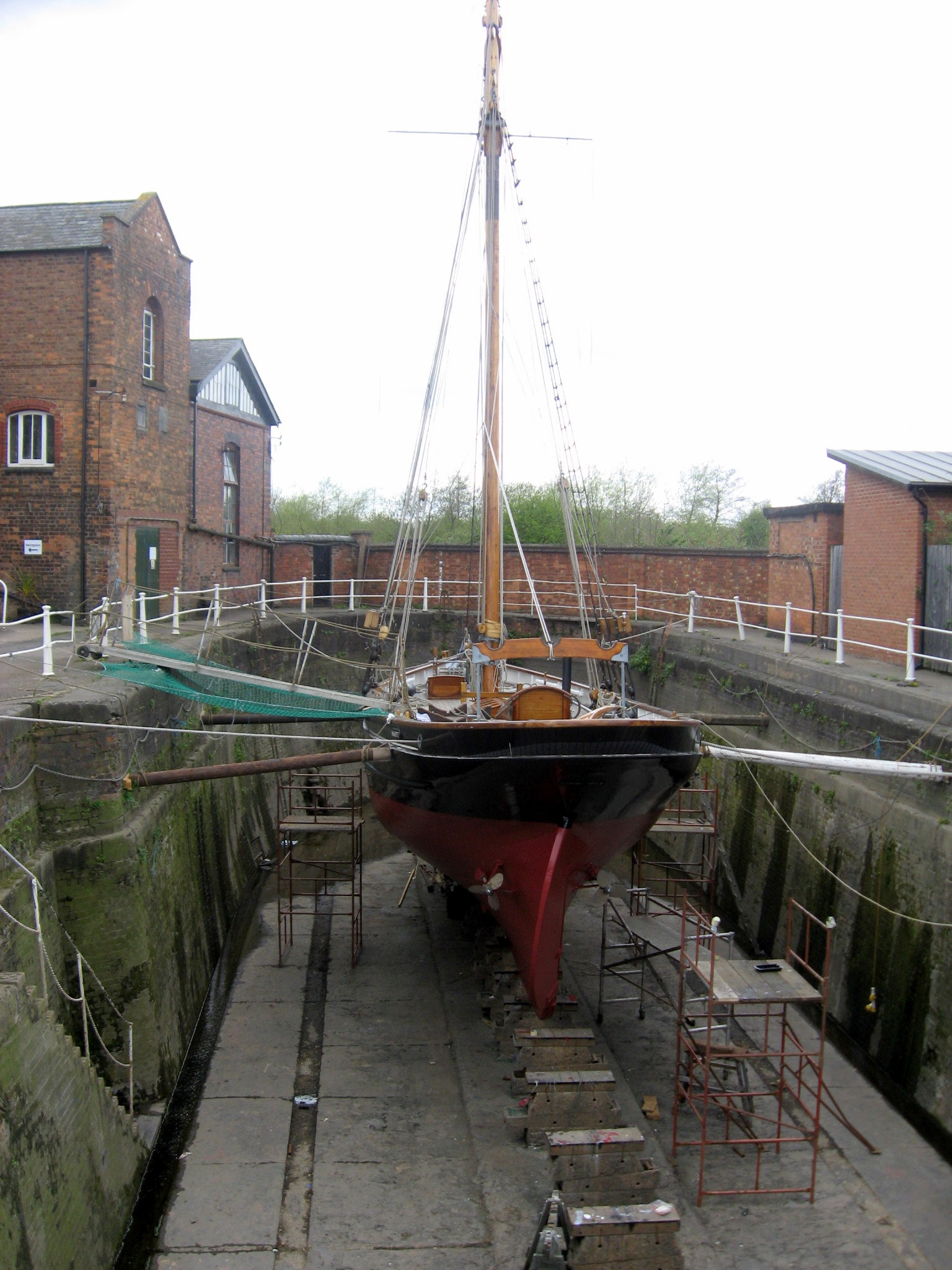
A small dry dock in Gloucester, England

In British English, a dock is an enclosed area of water used for loading, unloading, building or repairing ships. Such a dock may be created by building enclosing harbour walls into an existing natural water space, or by excavation within what would otherwise be dry land.

There are specific types of dock structures where the water level is controlled:

- A wet dock or impounded dock is a variant in which the water is impounded either by dock gates or by a lock, thus allowing ships to remain afloat at low tide in places with high tidal ranges. The level of water in the dock is maintained despite the rising and falling of the tide. This makes transfer of cargo easier. It works like a lock which controls the water level and allows passage of ships. The world's first enclosed wet dock with lock gates to maintain a constant water level irrespective of tidal conditions was the Howland Great Dock on the River Thames, built in 1703. The dock was merely a haven surrounded by trees, with no unloading facilities. The world's first commercial enclosed wet dock, with quays and unloading warehouses, was the Old Dock at Liverpool, built in 1715 and held up to 100 ships. The dock reduced ship waiting giving quick turnarounds, greatly improving the throughput of cargo.
- A drydock is another variant, also with dock gates, which can be emptied of water to allow investigation and maintenance of the underwater parts of ships.
- A floating dry dock (sometimes just floating dock) is a submersible structure which lifts ships out of the water to allow dry docking where no land-based facilities are available.

Where the water level is not controlled, berths may be:

- Floating, where there is always sufficient water to float the ship.
- NAABSA (Not Always Afloat But Safely Aground) where ships settle on the bottom at low tide. Ships using NAABSA facilities have to be designed for them.

A dockyard (or shipyard) consists of one or more docks, usually with other structures.

== American English ==
In American English, dock is technically synonymous with pier or wharf—any human-made structure in the water intended for people to be on. However, in modern use, pier is generally used to refer to structures originally intended for industrial use, such as seafood processing or shipping, and more recently for cruise ships, and dock is used for almost everything else, often with a qualifier, such as ferry dock, swimming dock, ore dock and others. However, pier is also commonly used to refer to wooden or metal structures that extend into the ocean from beaches and are used, for the most part, to accommodate fishing in the ocean without using a boat.

In American English, the term for the water area between piers is slip.

=== In parts of both the US and Canada ===
In the cottage country of Canada and the United States, a dock is a wooden platform built over water, with one end secured to the shore. The platform is used for the boarding and offloading of small boats.

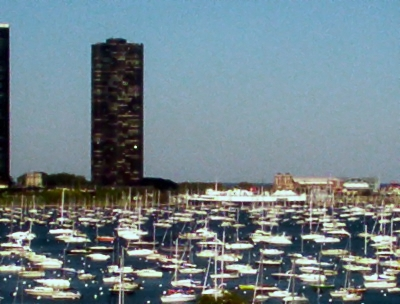
A boat dock on Lake Michigan in Chicago.

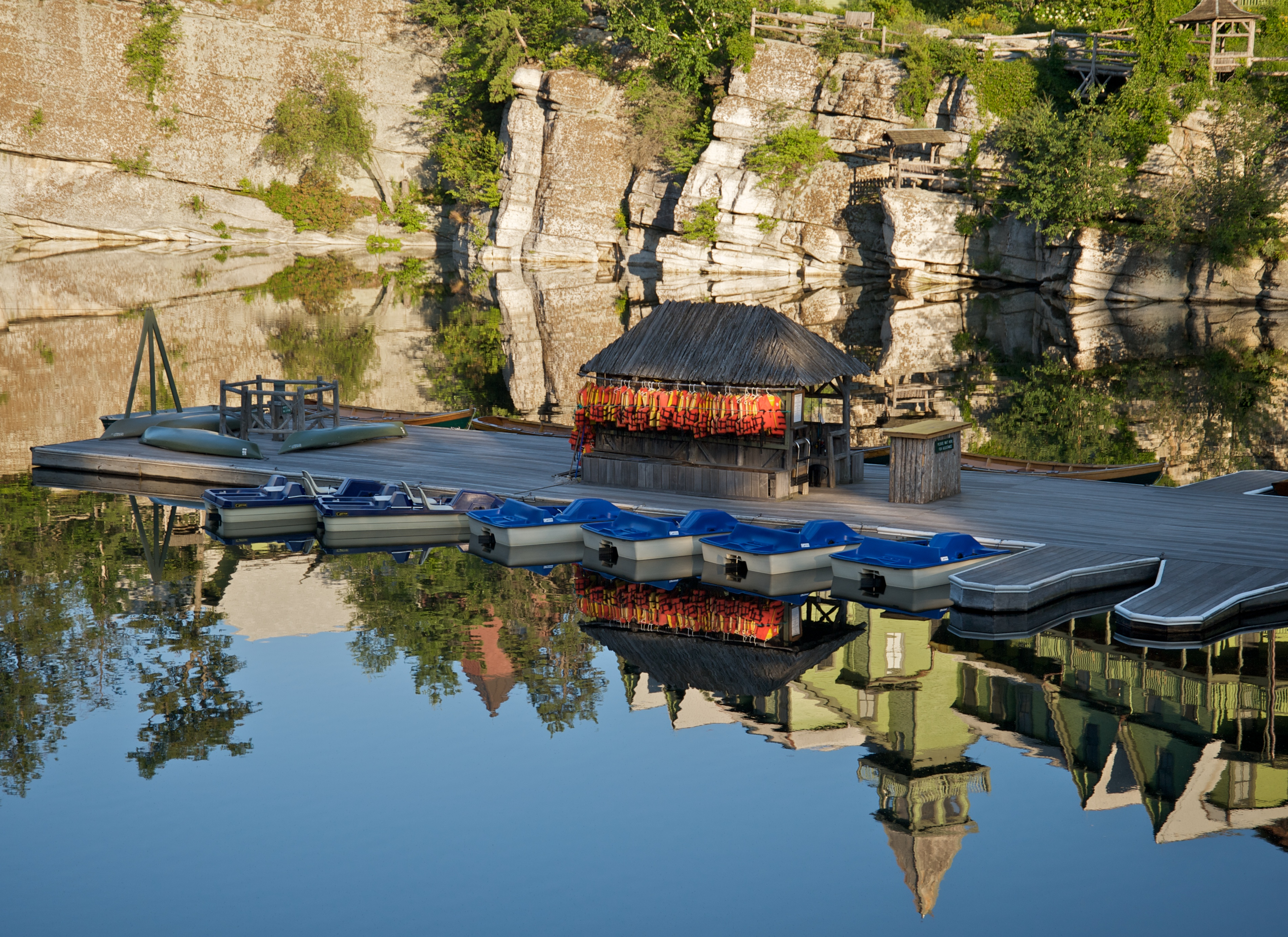
Floating dock at Mohonk Mountain House

== See also ==
- Dry dock: a narrow basin that can be flooded and drained to allow a load to come to rest on a dry platform
- Ferry slip: a specialized docking facility that receives a ferryboat
- Floating dock (impounded)
- Floating dock (jetty): a walkway over water, made buoyant with pontoons
- Harbor
- Jetty: a landing stage or small pier at which boats can dock or be moored.
- Marina: a boat basin offering dockage and other service for small craft
- Mole (architecture)
- Ore dock
- Pier: a raised walkway over water, supported by widely spread pilings or pillars
- Pontoon (boat): a buoyant device, used to support docks or floating bridges
- Quay: a concrete, stone, or metal platform lying alongside or projecting into water for loading and unloading ships.
- Slipway: a ramp on the shore by which ships or boats can be moved to and from the water
- Wharf: a fixed platform, commonly on pilings, where ships are loaded and unloaded

== Bibliography ==
- Rao, S. R. (1985). Lothal, a Harappan Port Town (1955–62). New Delhi: Archaeological Survey of India. OCLC 60370124.
