= Grade II listed buildings in Liverpool-L2 =

Liverpool is a city and port in Merseyside, England, which contains many listed buildings. A listed building is a structure designated by English Heritage of being of architectural and/or of historical importance and, as such, is included in the National Heritage List for England. There are three grades of listing, according to the degree of importance of the structure. Grade I includes those buildings that are of "exceptional interest, sometimes considered to be internationally important"; the buildings in Grade II* are "particularly important buildings of more than special interest"; and those in Grade II are "nationally important and of special interest". Very few buildings are included in Grade I — only 2.5% of the total. Grade II* buildings represent 5.5% of the total, while the great majority, 92%, are included in Grade II.

Liverpool contains more than 1,550 listed buildings, of which 28 are in Grade I, 109 in Grade II*, and the rest in Grade II. (Note: These figures are taken from a search in the National Heritage List for England in May 2013, and are subject to variation as further buildings are listed, grades are revised, or buildings are delisted.) This list contains the Grade II listed buildings in the L2 postal district of Liverpool. This area of the city formed the major commercial hub of the city during the 19th and early 20th centuries, and the great majority of the buildings in this list result from that historical period, being office buildings or warehouses. Most of these are located in the major commercial streets; Dale Street, Castle Street, Victoria Street, and North John Street. The other structures in the list include a church and associated structures, public houses, a monument, a fountain, ventilation stations for one of the Mersey Road Tunnels, a former fruit exchange, a war memorial, and two telephone kiosks.

Grade II listed buildings from other areas in the city can be found through the box on the right, along with the lists of the Grade I and Grade II* buildings in the city.

== Buildings ==
Name	Location	Photograph	Built	Notes
Barclays Bank	5 Brunswick Street; 53.4058°N 2.9914°W		1798–1800	Built as a private bank for Arthur Heywood and Sons, it is a stone building in three storeys and five bays. The ground floor is rusticated and the windows are round-arched. The entrance has a doorcase flanked by pilasters.
Halifax House	6 Brunswick Street; 53.4061°N 2.9917°W		c. 1870	This was built as the head office of the Union Bank, and later extended by G. E. Grayson. It is a stone building, in three storeys, with five bays on Brunswick Street and four bays on Fenwick Street. The main front has a central round-headed entrance and four windows, above which is a Doric pilastrade. The first floor windows are framed by Corinthian aedicules. All the windows are sashes. Inside is a large banking hall with polished granite columns, a glazed dome, and rich plasterwork.
Midland Bank	1 Castle Street; 53.4069°N 2.9910°W		1877	Initially built for the art dealers Agnew's, later used as a bank. It was designed by Salomons, Wornum and Ely, in Queen Anne style. The building is in brick, with stone and granite in the ground floor. It is in three storeys, with one bay on Castle Street, five bays on Dale Street, and a canted bay on the corner. The features include Tuscan and Composite pilasters, friezes, and a balustraded parapet.
Midshires Building Society	2 and 4 Castle Street, 1 Water Street; 53.4067°N 2.9916°W		1882	Originally built for the jewellers Robert Jones and Sons, later used as offices. It is in French Renaissance style, with bands of polychromatic stone, granite facing, and a red tiled roof. The building has four storeys and an attic, with one bay on Castle Street and four on Water Street. There are projecting display windows in the ground floor, windows above surrounded by delicate carving, and wrought iron balconies.
—	3 and 5 Castle Street; 53.4068°N 2.9909°W		1888–90	An office building designed by Grayson and Ould for the British and Foreign Marine Insurance Company. It has five storeys and attics, and is in five bays. The ground floor is in granite, the first floor in red sandstone, the floors above in brick with terracotta dressings, and the roof is slated. Above the first floor is a mosaic frieze depicting shipping scenes. Other features include two two-storey oriel windows, Corinthian pilasters, dormers in gables, and pyramidal roofs over the outer bays crowned with spike finials.
Cheltenham and Gloucester Building Society	6 and 8 Castle Street; 53.4066°N 2.9915°W		1897	A stone office building in six storeys with five bays. There are modern shop windows in the ground floor, windows flanked by pilasters, a balcony and a frieze in the first floor, and windows with keystones and pediments in the second floor. The third and fourth floors contain an attached tetrastyle Ionic portico. This has a pediment broken by the central attic window.
—	10–18 Castle Street; 53.4065°N 2.9914°W		1880s	A stone office building and shops with a slate roof. It has four storeys and an attic, and is in five bays. All the shop fronts are modern other than No 10 which has that of the original chemist's shop. On the first floor the windows have attached Corinthian column with entablatures and balconies, in the second floor the windows have aedicules and an entablature, and in the third floor they have pilasters, columns and a dentilled cornice. In the attic are dormers with finials.
Queen Insurance Building, Castle Street	13 Castle Street; 53.4064°N 2.9907°W		1887–88	An office building designed by Grayson and Ould. It is in brick with stone dressings, a granite ground floor, and a slate Mansard roof. The building has four storeys, and is five bays wide. In the ground floor, two of the bays form an arched entrance to Queen Avenue. In the first floor, between the windows, are Corinthian pilasters, and between the windows in the second floor are Ionic half-columns. On the front of the building are friezes, and at the top are dormers.
—	17–21 Castle Street; 53.4065°N 2.9908°W		1880s	A stone office building in polished granite and stone, in five storeys and three bays. In the ground floor is an entrance with a cornice, which is flanked by modern shop windows. Above are windows with pilasters, and a frieze. The top floor contains small three-light windows.
—	25 Castle Street; 53.4064°N 2.9907°W		1880s	An office building with three storeys, an attic and a basement, which extends over the entrance to Sweeting Street. It has five bays, the central three of which project forward. There is a central round-arched entrance with pilasters and a frieze. In the first floor are attached Corinthian columns, a frieze, and a dentilled cornice. At the top of the building is a segmental pediment and five acroteria.
Yorkshire Building Society	27 Castle Street; 53.4063°N 2.9906°W		1848	Built as offices for the lawyer Ambrose Lace, its design attributed to Arthur Hill Holme. It is in Neoclassical style. The building is constructed in stone, has three storeys, and is in three bays. In the ground floor are four granite pilasters, a cornice and a balcony. In the first floor is a four-column Corinthian portico with a carved tympanum. In the upper two storeys are sash windows, and at the top of the building is a decorated parapet and a large acroterion.
National Westminster Overseas Bank	32–34 Castle Street; 53.4063°N 2.9912°W		1898–1901	Built for Parr's Bank and designed by Richard Norman Shaw in association with Willink and Thicknesse, it is in five storeys with a basement, and has five bays. The building is in Neoclassical style. The basement is in rusticated granite, above which are bands of grey-green and cream marble, with window surrounds and a cornice in terracotta. At the top of the building are flat-roofed dormers. Inside is a circular, domed banking hall.
—	36 Castle Street; 53.4062°N 2.9911°W		1895	A building designed by Grayson and Ould for Leyland and Bullin's Bank, with an extension in 1900. It is a stone building with a polished red granite base, in four storeys and attics. There are four bays on Castle Street, and five bays on Brunswick Street. The windows are mullioned and transomed. There is a round domed turret on the corner, and a smaller turret at the end of the Brunswick Street face; between the turrets is a decorated gable. On the top of the Castle Street face are three dormers, a dentilled cornice, and a balustraded parapet.
National and Provincial Building Society	42 Castle Street; 53.4059°N 2.9908°W		1893	Earlier known as Victoria Chambers. this is an office building by Grayson and Ould in Renaissance style. It is in white stone, with four storeys and attics, and has five bays. The ground floor has been modernised. In the first and second floors are two oriel windows between which are three more windows, and pilasters. Above these are a richly carved frieze and a cornice. The top storey has round-arched windows and balconies. At the summit of the building is a carved parapet, and three gables containing columns, pilasters, arcading and sculptures of mermen. In the central gable are the arms of Lancaster; the other gables have pineapple finials.
—	44 Castle Street; 53.40577°N 2.99076°W		1890s	An office building faced in purple rusticated faience, with five storeys and in two bays. All the windows have green architraves. It has a Dutch gable containing foliage decoration.
—	46 Castle Street; 53.4058°N 2.9907°W		Late 18th century	An office building with four storeys and a basement, with two bays. The ground floor has a modern shop, there are modern windows in the first floor, sash windows on the second floor, and casement windows in the top floor. At the sides of the building are pilasters, and there are cornices over the second and third floors.
—	48 and 50 Castle Street; 53.40573°N 2.99074°W		1864	A stone building designed by James Picton for the Mercantile and Exchange Bank. It is tall and narrow, with three storeys and a basement, and is in four bays. The basement and ground floor contains granite Doric columns on pedestals, with a cornice above. The windows are round-headed casements, those in the first floor having Corinthian pilasters and relief busts in the tympana.
Scottish Provident	52 & 54 Castle Street; 53.4055°N 2.9906°W		Late 18th century	A stone office building in four storeys and with four bays. It has two entrances with lintels and traceried fanlights. The upper parts of the building are in rusticated stucco. In the first floor are two bay windows with fluted Doric half-columns, a frieze, and a cornice. Above are sash windows.
—	60 and 62 Castle Street; 53.4054°N 2.9906°W		1868	This was built as the Alliance Bank, designed by Lucy and Littler, and used later as a hotel. It is a stone building with three storeys, a mezzanine, and an attic. There are seven bays on Castle Street, and six on Derby Square. The entrance bay is elaborate, containing pilasters carved with swags. Above the entrance is a balustraded balcony. Other features include round-arched windows in the second floor with carved reclining figures in the spandrels, and more balconies and balustrades.
Hargreaves Building	5 Chapel Street; 53.4073°N 2.9942°W		1859	This was built for the banker Sir William Brown as his headquarters, and designed by Sir James Picton. It is constructed in stone with a granite basement and a slate roof. The building has three storeys and a basement. Five bays face Chapel Street, and seven face Covent Garden. On the ground floor are round-headed windows flanked by granite columns, and with balustraded balconies above. Between the heads of the windows are roundels containing carvings of people involved with the exploration of the Americas, including Christopher Columbus and Cortez. The floors above also contain round-headed windows, and at the top is a frieze and a cornice.
Church of Our Lady and Saint Nicholas	Chapel Street; 53.4070°N 2.9948°W		1811–14	The parish church of Liverpool, its oldest surviving part is the tower, which was designed by Thomas Harrison in Decorated style. The church was damaged by bombing in 1940, and its body was rebuilt by Edward C. Butler in Perpendicular style.
Walls, railings and gateway	Chapel Street; 53.40673°N 2.99508°W		1885	These consist of the retaining wall to the west of the churchyard of the Church of Our Lady and Saint Nicholas, and the railings and gateway to the south of the church. The wall is in stone with a moulded plinth and coping, and the railings are iron. The gateway is a pointed arch with battlements above. It is flanked by piers with crocketed pinnacles.
William Simpson Memorial Fountain	Chapel Street; 53.40703°N 2.99534°W		1885	Attached to the retaining wall of the Church of Our Lady and Saint Nicholas is this stone fountain on a granite plinth. It consists of a Gothic canopy with a niche containing a bronze portrait medallion. This is flanked by buttresses with pinnacles, and at the top is a foliated finial. The fountain was designed by Thomas Cox, and the medallion is by Joseph Rogerson.
—	69 Church Street; 2 and 4 Parker Street; 53.4051°N 2.9821°W		Late 19th century	A stuccoed shop building in three storeys with an attic. It has one bay on Church Street and three on Parker Street. On the first and second floors are large mullioned and transomed bow windows, with a deep entablature above. There is a pargetted band between the floors and a frieze over the second floor.
Liverpool, London and Globe Building	1 Dale Street; 53.4074°N 2.9911°W		1856–58	Built for the Liverpool and London Insurance Company, the stone office block was designed by C. R. and F. P. Cockerell. The attic and slate Mansard roof were added in 1920. The building has three storeys, a basement and an attic. Five bays face Dale Street, and there are 15 bays along each side. The central doorway has red granite Doric columns and a pediment. In the second floor is a Corinthian colonnade with balconies and windows under round-headed arches.
Former Midland Bank	4 Dale Street; 53.4070°N 2.9908°W		c. 1971	Built for the Midland Bank and later used as a supermarket and offices, the building was designed by Raymond Fletcher of Bradshaw, Rowse & Harker in Modernist style. It is built on a steel and concrete frame and has five storeys with a basement and a five-bay front. The ground floor has a shop front and the floors above are divided by stainless steel frames into 20 modules on the front and eight on the right side. Each module contains faceted windows of mirrored glass that project outwards to form a modern type of oriel window.
Queen Insurance Buildings, Dale Street	6–10 Dale Street; 53.4071°N 2.9905°W		1839	Designed by Samuel Rowland for the Royal Bank, and later used for offices, the stone building has three storeys, and is in nine bays. Entrances lead through the building into Queen Avenue and Sweeting Street. The central five bays have a large Corinthian portico with a frieze. Elsewhere are pilasters, and at the top is a balustraded parapet with the royal arms in the centre.
Union Marine Buildings	11 Dale Street; 53.4076°N 2.9902°W		1859	An office building for the Queen Insurance Company designed by James Picton. It has Italian Renaissance and Gothic features. The office is built in stone with a granite rusticated basement. Six bays are on Dale Street, with five on Hackins Hay. The ground floor windows are round-headed, on the first floor are six windows with pilastered architraves. On the top floor are round-headed windows behind balustraded balconies. At the top of the buildings is a heavy cornice with cable moulding.
State Insurance Building	14 Dale Street; 53.40726°N 2.99013°W		1903–05	An office building designed by Walter Aubrey Thomas in Gothic style. It was originally symmetrical with a central turret but the northern half of the building was destroyed during the Second World War. It has three bays, the bay on the left has five storeys rising to a turret; the other two bays have three storeys and an attic. The building is in stone with polished red granite on the ground floor. The front is highly ornamented.
Saddle Inn	17 Dale Street; 53.4076°N 2.9900°W		1850s	A public house in brick with stone dressings, in four storeys. Three bays face Dale Street, with five bays on Hackins Hey. In the ground floor the windows have elliptical arches, a carved frieze and a cornice; between them are flat pilasters. All the windows are sashes with architraves.
Rigby's Buildings	21–25 Dale Street; 53.4077°N 2.9898°W		1726	A public house and offices, re-fronted in stucco in 1865. It has five storeys, and is in seven bays. The windows are sashes, those in the first and second floors having balustrades, decorated architraves and lintels, balconies, and pediments. Along the top of the building is a cornice, with a parapet flanked by balustrades.
The Temple	22A and 24 Dale Street; 53.4077°N 2.9890°W		1864–65	An office building designed by Sir James Picton for Sir William Brown. It is in stone with a granite basement, and a Mansard roof. It has three storeys, an attic and a basement, and is in seven bays. Along the ground floor is a Tuscan colonnade with a frieze and a cornice. Above the entrance is a tower with a cupola and finials.
Prudential Assurance Building	30–38 Dale Street; 53.4078°N 2.9887°W		1886	Designed by Alfred Waterhouse with an extension including a tower added in 1904–06 by Paul Waterhouse. It is in red brick and terracotta with granite dressing. The building has five storeys and an attic, with six bays on Dale Street, four bays on Temple Street, and a canted bay on the corner. This bay contains the entrance, and above it is a two-storey canted oriel window. Other features include friezes, a canopied niche, an arcaded parapet, and dormers.
Trident House	31–33 Dale Street; 53.4079°N 2.9894°W		1879	Built for the Liverpool Reform Club, and designed by Edmund Kirby, later used as offices. It is in brick with sandstone and granite dressings, and has a slate roof. The building has two storeys with attics, and is in seven bays. The central bay protrudes forward and contains a Tuscan porch with a balustraded balcony. Along the first floor is a wrought iron balcony. The interior was remodelled in the late 20th century, retaining many original features.
Guardian Assurance Buildings	35 Dale Street; 53.4080°N 2.9891°W		1893	An office building, probably designed by Grayson and Ould. The front is in stone, and the left side in brick. There are three storeys, a basement and an attic, and at the corner is a turret. In the ground floor is a mullioned and transomed window, and an entrance flanked by Corinthian pilasters on plinths. Above this is a bull's-eye window flanked by cherubs and foliage, and surmounted by a segmental pediment. Other decorative features include a frieze with a cartouche flanked by cherubs holding ribbons.
Buckleys Buildings	38–46 Dale Street; 53.4079°N 2.9883°W		1880s	A brick office building with stone dressings, in six storeys with eight bays, and a canted corner. Above the entrance is a dentilled cornice, and there is another cornice over the second floor. The windows are rectangular with moulded architraves, and those in the third floor have pediments.
Musker's Buildings	48–54 Dale Street, 7–11 Stanley Street; 53.4081°N 2.9879°W		1881–82	An office building designed by Thomas E. Murray in Gothic Revival style. It is built in red sandstone with polished red granite on the ground floor. At the corners are canted bays with two-storey oriel windows. Seven bays stretch along Stanley Street. Features include windows of different forms, gables, balconies, dormers, and two turrets each surmounted by an octagonal lantern with a short spire and a finial.
—	51–55 Dale Street; 53.4082°N 2.9884°W		Early 19th century	This is the façade of a former bank building. It is stuccoed, in three storeys with and attic, in seven bays. The ground floor is rusticated, with round-headed windows, and a pedimented doorway. In the first and second floors is a Corinthian pilastrade. The attic contains sash windows.
Imperial Chambers	58–66 Dale Street; 53.4082°N 2.9876°W		c. 1870	A stone office building in Gothic style. It has four storeys and extends for five bays. In the ground floor are shop fronts, and a central entrance between Corinthian columns. The first floor has three-light windows and barley-sugar columns, and in the second floor are five two-light windows. In the top floor are four three-light windows, and a central four light window. Above these is a cornice, a balustraded parapet, and a gable containing carved relief figures.
Municipal Annexe	68 Dale Street; 53.4083°N 2.9872°W		1882–83	This was built as the Conservative Club, and used later as offices. It was designed by F. and G. Holme in French Renaissance style. It is constructed in stone with a slated Mansard roof, and has three storeys, a basement and an attic. There are six bays on Dale Street, six bays on Sir Thomas Street, and a recessed curved corner bay between them. The entrance is flanked by paired Corinthian pilasters. Other features include a Venetian window, balconies, Corinthian columns, and pedimented windows. The area balustrade, railings, and attached lampholders are included in the listing.
Westminster Buildings	90–98 Dale Street; 1 and 3 Crosshall Street; 53.4090°N 2.9856°W		1879–80	A block containing shops and offices, originally with warehousing behind, designed by Richard Owens, with carving by Joseph Rogerson. It is in Gothic style, built in stone with red granite window shafts, and with a slate Mansard roof containing dormers. The building has three storeys, an attic and a basement. On Dale Street are six bays with modern shop fronts. The carvings include arms flanked by dragons, and portrait heads in the tympana. The windows on the first floor have columns with foliated capitals.
—	135–139 Dale Street; 53.4098°N 2.9844°W		c. 1790	This originated as a house, later used as shops and offices. It is in four storeys, with six bays on Dale Street and six on Trueman Street. The Dale Street front has shop fronts in the ground floor and sash windows above, and a dentilled cornice. On the Trueman Street side the first five bays are symmetrical with a three-bay pedimented cornice. The entrance is round-arched with a Doric doorcase. In the first floor is a Venetian window.
Magistrates' Courts	Dale Street; 53.4092°N 2.9859°W		1857–59	The courts were designed by John Weightman. They are in stone on a granite plinth, and have three storeys. There are 13 bays along Dale Street, a recessed canted corner, and three bays on Hatton Garden. In the ground floor is a carriage entry in the centre. All the windows are sashes. On the front of the building are rusticated giant pilasters and an entablature. At the top of the building is a cornice and a central pediment.
Castle Moat House	Derby Square; 53.4053°N 2.9908°W		1838–40	Designed by Edward Corbett for the North and South Wales Bank. It is a stone building in three storeys, with three bays facing Derby Square, and five bays along Fenwick Street. The building has large Corinthian columns, friezes, pediments, and sash windows with architraves. It is built partly over the moat of the former Liverpool Castle.
Queen Victoria Monument	Derby Square; 53.4050°N 2.9902°W		1902–06	This consists of a domed baldacchino, carried on columns, and standing on a stepped podium surrounded by balustraded walls. It was designed by F. M. Simpson in association with Willink and Thicknesse. In the centre is the standing figure of Queen Victoria, a bronze statue by C. J. Allen. Around the monument are statues depicting personifications, and on the top of the dome is one representing Fame.
Piazza Fountain and viewing platforms	Drury Lane; 53.4053°N 2.9925°W		1966–67	The kinetic water sculpture in Beetham Plaza was designed by Richard Huws. It consists of seven vertical bronze posts, on which are mounted at different heights 20 stainless steel pivoted cups of varying size. Water passes up the poles and pours into the cups, which tip over at different times forming a cascade. The fountain is set in a circular receiving basin that incorporates a spiral viewing platform in reinforced concrete, and there is another similar detached viewing platform.
Exchange Buildings	Exchange Flags; 53.4074°N 2.9927°W		1939–56	Building of the office block was interrupted by the Second World War, and the basement was converted into a bunker to house the Western Approaches Command Headquarters. In 1953 a bronze war memorial made in 1916 by Joseph Phillips was moved into the south wall of the building. This is flanked by statues by Siegfried Charoux in Portland stone. The rest of the building is in eleven storeys on a U-shaped plan; it is in concrete with a steel frame and stone cladding.
Liverpool Cotton Association War Memorial	Exchange Flags; 53.40767°N 2.99244°W		1922	The war memorial was designed by Francis Derwent Wood and unveiled by Earl Haig. It is in bronze and depicts a life-size figure of an infantryman. The memorial originally stood in front of the Liverpool Cotton Exchange Building, and was moved to its present site in front of the Exchange Building when the exchange moved its offices.
Mason's Buildings	28 Exchange Street East; 53.40798°N 2.99114°W		c. 1866	A stone office building designed by John Cunningham in Renaissance style. It has four storeys, a basement and an attic, and is in four bays. On the ground floor is a Doric colonnade with red granite columns. Elsewhere there is much carving with subjects including cherubs, foliage, lions' masks, swags, and reclining figures representing the seasons. At the top of the building is a shaped gable with a Diocletian window.
K6 Telephone Kiosk	Exchange Street West; 53.40724°N 2.99210°W		1935	A K6 type telephone kiosk, designed by Giles Gilbert Scott. It has a square plan, is in cast iron and has a domed top. The top panels contain unperforated crowns.
K2 Telephone Kiosk	Exchange Street West; 53.40721°N 2.99206°W		c. 1935	A K2 type telephone kiosk, designed by Giles Gilbert Scott, and manufactured by Walter Macfarlane and Company of Glasgow. It is in cast iron and has a domed top. The top panels contain crowns.
George's Dock Ventilation and Control Station	George's Dock Way; 53.4047°N 2.9939°W		1932	A structure faced in Portland stone containing offices and fans to ventilate the Mersey Road Tunnel. It was designed by Herbert J. Rowse, and built by Basil Mott in association with J. A. Brodie. It was reconstructed in 1951–52 by Rowse following war damage. Its Art Deco decoration is by Edmund C. Thompson assisted by George T. Capstick. This includes a figure representing Speed, black basalt statues of Night and Day, and panels representing Civil Engineering, Construction, Architecture, and Decoration.
-	10 Hockenhall Alley; 53.40883°N 2.98728°W		Late 18th/early 19th century	Modest house, originally part of a row, irregular bonded brick, slate roof, three storeys, one bay.
—	81–89 Lord Street; 53.4055°N 2.9865°W		1901	An office block designed by Walter Aubrey Thomas in Italian Gothic style. It is built in stone, with bands of red and white stone on the façade. The building is in four storeys, with shop fronts and a doorway on the ground floor. The third floor consists of three round-headed arches, each containing mullioned and transomed windows, those in the middle arch being recessed. Above each arch is a row of five lancet windows, over which is a gable containing three windows. Between the gables are octagonal turrets.
—	23 Mathew Street; 53.4065°N 2.9872°W		Early 19th century	A warehouse in four storeys, with three bays. In the centre is a loading bay with an arched head and a keystone. The windows are sashes. The entrance has a stone pediment with a brick tympanum containing a window.
Lion Tavern	67 Moorfields; 53.4090°N 2.9904°W		Mid 19th century	A public house on a corner, its front remodelled and its interior refitted in about 1900–05. The building is in three storeys, with three bays on each street. It has three storeys, the ground floor being in timber and glass, the upper floors stuccoed, and the roof slated. The interior is largely unchanged since its refitting. It has an L-shaped corridor leading into the former news room and the drinking lobby. The furnishings include panelling, etched glass in the windows, a tiled Art Nouveau dado, a mosaic floor, and a glazed dome over the drinking lobby.
—	18–22 North John Street; 53.4063°N 2.9889°W		1840s	A stuccoed office building in four storeys. Eight bays face North John Street, four face Cook Street, and there is a curved bay between them. The windows on the first floor are casements; the rest are sashes. Two of the first floor windows have pediments, and some have architraves.
Solicitors Law Stationery Society	19 and 21 North John Street; 53.4067°N 2.9888°W		1854	Built as Melbourne House, this is a stuccoed office building in four storeys, and three bays. In the ground floor is a central shop window, flanked by round-arched doorways. In the first floor is a round-arched window, the second floor has rectangular windows, balconies, lintels, and pediments. The top floor contains oculi, above which is a segmental open pediment. A rooftop extension was added in 1975.
Harrington Chambers	24–26 North John Street; 53.4059°N 2.9886°W		1840s	A stuccoed office building with a slate roof. It is in four storeys with an attic. There are 13 bays on North John Street, one bay on Harrington Street, and a curved bay between them. In the ground floor are modern shop fronts. Above them, the bays are divided by panelled giant pilasters. The windows are sashes. At the top of the building are pediments, which are segmental, triangular, and round.
Clarence Building and Marldon Chambers	28–40 North John Street, 35 Lord Street; 53.4055°N 2.9885°W		1841	A stuccoed office building with four storeys. It was remodelled in 1884. There are 14 bays on North John Street, six bays on Harrington Street, and a curved bay corner bay linking to two bays on Lord Street. Most of the façade is symmetrical, containing a Corinthian portico with pilasters in the first and second floors. All the windows are sashes. At the top of the building is a cornice and a pediment.
Central Buildings	37–45 North John Street; 53.4060°N 2.9882°W		1884	A large office block designed by Thomas C. Clarke. It is built in stone with a granite ground floor, in four storeys and a basement. There are 20 bays on North John Street, eight on Matthew Street, and eleven on Harrington Street. On the ground floor is a colonnade with an entablature. The first floor has 14 round-arched windows, panelled pilasters, a frieze and a cornice. In the second floor are rectangular windows, and the top floor contains round-arched windows in the centre, flanked by rectangular windows. At the top of the building is a cornice.
Ventilation Station	North John Street; 53.4069°N 2.9894°W		1931–34	A tall structure in Portland stone containing fans to ventilate the Mersey Road Tunnel. It was designed by Herbert J. Rowse, and built by Basil Mott in association with J. A. Brodie. It consists of a tower set on a rectangular base, and contains windows and Art Deco ornamentation.
Mersey Chambers	2 Old Churchyard; 53.4071°N 2.9939°W		c. 1878	An office building designed by G.E. Grayson for the shipping firm of Thomas and James Harrison. It is in stone with a granite basement, a lead roof, and is in brick at the rear. It is in Italianate style. The building gas three storeys, a basement and an attic, and is in eleven bays. There are oriel windows on the rear; elsewhere all the windows are sashes. Inside is a glass-roofed court, and a fine board room dating from the 1920s.
—	1, 3 and 5 (part) Queen Avenue; 53.4068°N 2.9905°W		1880s	An office building in white brick with sandstone dressings and a tiled roof. It consists of two blocks joined by a single-storey, bay. The western block has five storeys and three bays, the eastern has three storeys with an attic and is in four bays. The windows are sashes, an don the roof is a small spire.
—	2–14 Queen Avenue; 53.4067°N 2.9905°W		1880s	A office building in white brick with sandstone dressings. It has three storeys and an attic, and is in eight bays. The bays are divided by pilasters, and each bay contains a canted oriel window. The other windows are sashes.
—	5 (part), 7 and 9 Queen Avenue; 53.4069°N 2.9905°W		1830s	An office building in stone with a tiled roof. The left part was rebuilt in the 1880s. It has three storeys, a basement and an attic. The building is in ten bays, two of which curve back. In the ground floor the doorway is flanked by three-light mullioned windows. The windows above are sashes.
—	20 - 24 Queen Avenue; Gateway to Sweeting Street; 53.4069°N 2.9902°W		1830s	This consists of an office building and an archway. The office building is in stone with a slate roof, and it extends for eleven bays. The gateway consists of an arch leading to Sweeting Street. It has a large scrolled keystone and a tympanum. It contains cast iron gates, and is surmounted by a cast iron overthrow with a lantern.
—	19–23 Sir Thomas Street; 45 Whitechapel; 53.4069°N 2.9850°W		1860s	Stuccoed shops with a slate roof in three storeys. There are six bays on Sir Thomas Street, two bays on Whitechapel, and a canted bay in the corner between them. All the windows are sashes, some separated by pilasters, and others by carved panels.
Minerva Chambers	20 Sir Thomas Street; 53.4079°N 2.9865°W		1880s	An office in stone with a slate roof, it is in four storeys with a basement and attic. It has a Mansard roof with dormers. There are seven bays of differing width, and the windows have an irregular pattern. Separating the windows between the basement and the first floor are narrow columns with foliated capitals supporting a cornice.
Barned's Buildings	15–19 Sweeting Street; 53.4065°N 2.9901°W		c. 1840	A stuccoed purpose-built office building in three storeys and a| basement. The building is in Neoclassical style. It has an L-shaped plan with a total of 16 bays. The western 11 bays are symmetrical with a central three-bay pediment. The windows are sashes, and the doorcases are in Doric style. The building has been converted into flats.
—	6 Temple Court; 53.4066°N 2.9870°W		Early 19th century	A brick office building with stone dressings. It has three storeys and five bays. The entrance door has a cornice and three roundels above it. All the windows are sashes with wedge lintels.
-	59 - 61 Tithebarn Street; 53.41000°N 2.98954°W		c. 1870	Printing and bookbinding factory and warehouse for Union Paper and Printing Co. Ltd.
—	8 Temple Court; 53.4065°N 2.9869°W		c. 1840 (?)	A brick warehouse with stone dressings, it is in four storeys. There are seven bays facing Temple Court, curving round to three bays on Mathew Street. Above the entrance is a cornice and three roundels. Most of the windows are sashes, except for casement windows in the third floor. On the Mathew Street side is a loading bay, above which is a stone pediment with a brick tympanum.
—	1 and 3 Union Court; 53.4064°N 2.9903°W		1840s	A stuccoed office building with ten bays. It has three storeys, a basement, and an attic above the first bay. Steps lead up to the entrance, which has pilasters and an entablature. All the windows are sashes.
—	9 Union Court; 53.4066°N 2.9898°W		1840s	A stuccoed office building in four storeys and with three bays. The windows are sashes, those on the first and second floors having architraves. There are two entrances, one with a round head.
Regina House	1 Victoria Street; 53.4066°N 2.9887°W		1881	An office building designed by Cornelius Sherlock for the brewer Andrew Barclay Walker in Italianate style. It is built in stone with a slate roof, and has three storeys, a basement and an attic. There are four bays on Victoria Street, three bays on North John Street, and three further bays curving round the corner between them. On the first floor is an attached colonnade, and elsewhere the windows are flanked by pilasters. At the top of the building is a panelled parapet and dormers. The central dormer has pilasters and a pediment with an acroterion, the others have segmental pediments.
Produce Exchange Building	6A–8 Victoria Street; 53.4065°N 2.9880°W		1902	This office building was designed by Henry Shelmerdine. Originally the ground floor was a goods depot for the Lancashire and Yorkshire Railway. It is constructed in stone, the ground floor being granite, and has a Mansard roof with dormers. It is in five storeys with attics, and has seven bays. Its style is loosely Baroque. Its features include mullioned and transomed windows, an Ionic colonnade on the 2nd and 3rd floors, three-light bow windows, and a turret.
Fruit Exchange	10–18 Victoria Street; 53.4067°N 2.9875°W		c. 1888	This was built originally as a goods depot for the London and North Western Railway, and converted into a fruit exchange in 1923 by J. B. Hutchins. The ground floor has been converted into public houses. It is built in sandstone with a hipped slate roof. The building has a J-shaped plan, and is in three and 3 1/2 storeys, with a main front of 13 bays. External features include oriel windows, and a parapet incorporating dormers. Some windows contain stained glass depicting fruit. Inside the building two exchange halls are still present, with Ionic supporting columns.
Union House	21 Victoria Street; 53.4071°N 2.9875°W		1882	An office building in five storeys with a semi-basement. The ground floor has a red granite colonnade; the rest of the building is in ashlar stone. The building is five bays wide, the bays being separated by pilasters, and the storeys by cornices. An archway in the left bay leads to Progress Place. The entrance vestibule has wrought iron gate, and a frieze. Inside is an iron staircase, stained glass windows, mahogany doorways, and ornamental plasterwork.
Bank of Liverpool	45 Victoria Street; 24 Sir Thomas Street; 53.4076°N 2.9863°W		1881–82	A building designed by G. E. Grayson for the Bank of Liverpool. It is in Neoclassical style, and is constructed in stone on a granite base. The building has three storeys, an attic and a basement. There are seven bays on Victoria Street, five bays on Sir Thomas Street, and canted corner bays between them. Above the central entrance is a frieze with a carved inscription and foliage, and a segmental pediment containing coins and the date. In the first floor is an attached Doric colonnade and balustraded balconies. At the top of the building is a cornice and an open pediment.
Midshires Building Society	3 Water Street; 53.4067°N 2.9918°W		1860s	A bank building in stone with two storeys. It has three bays on Water Street, and five bays on Lower Castle Street. An elaborate east doorway was added in 1883 for the Manchester and Liverpool District Bank. The ground floor is rusticated with quoins and a cornice. Above are sash windows, and at the top of the building is a cornice and a balustraded parapet.
General Accident Building	7 Water Street; 3 Fenwick Street; 53.4065°N 2.9922°W		c. 1896	The original part, facing Fenwick Street, was designed by Grayson and Ould for the Bank of Liverpool. This has lunettes decorated with Celtic interlace. The part facing Water Street was built in 1933–34 for the National Provincial Bank, and designed by Palmer and Holden. The building is in granite, and has three storeys. On Water Street are five symmetrical bays, and along Fenwick Street are nine bays. The features of the Water Street façade include a rusticated ground floor with bronze doors containing lions' heads, above which are large fluted Doric columns, and balustraded balconies. Inside is a barrel vaulted hall with Art Deco reliefs.
—	6 and 8 Wood Street; 53.4041°N 2.9816°W		Early 19th century	This consists of offices and a workshop. The office is in brick with stone dressings. It has three storeys and is in three bays, with a pediment at the top. The workshop is in a single storey, is stuccoed and slated. All the windows are sashes.

== See also ==
Architecture of Liverpool
