= Liverpool Maritime Mercantile City =

Former World Heritage Site in Liverpool, England

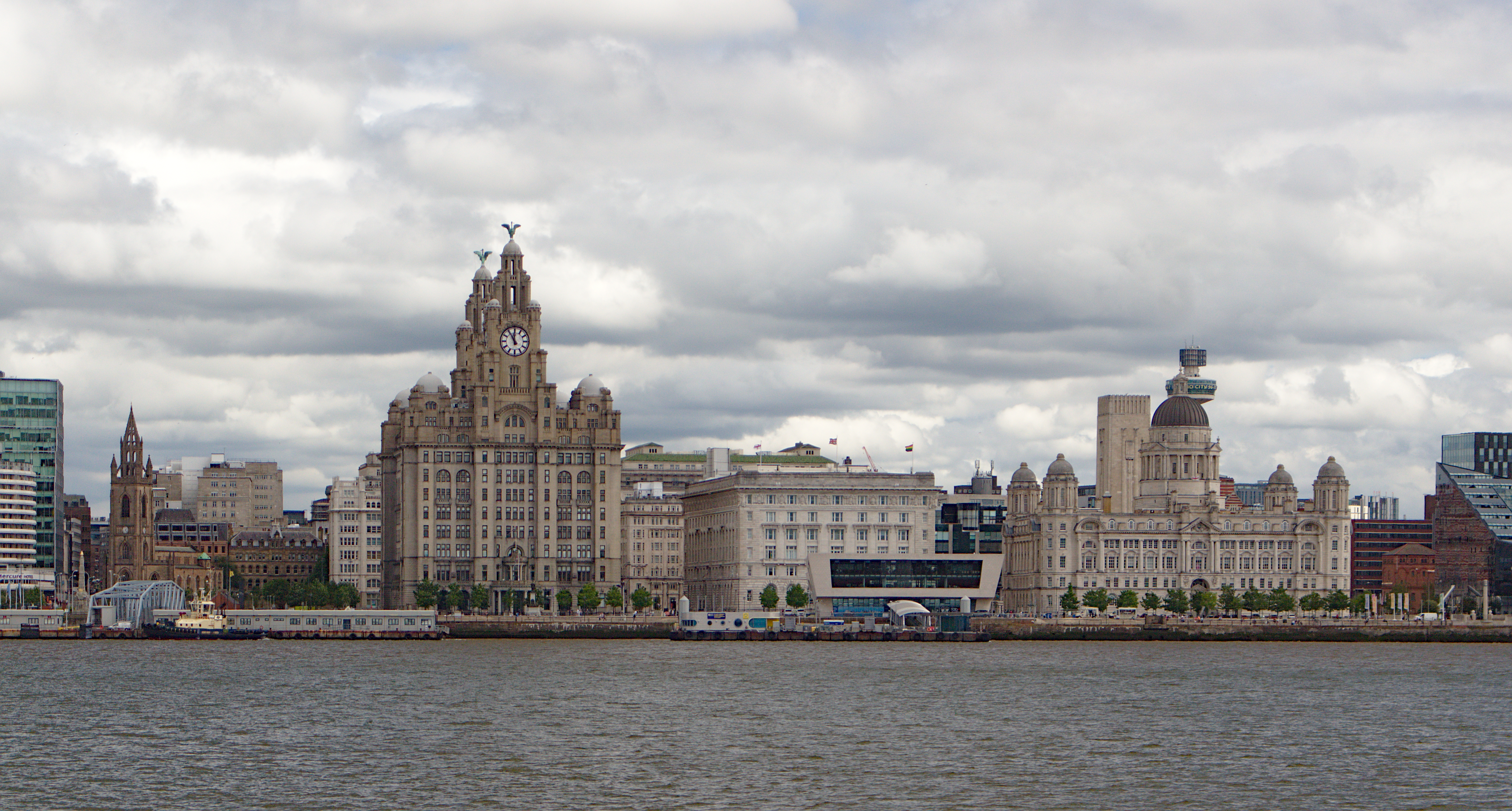
- Liverpool Pier Head

- Location within North West of England Location within England Location within the United Kingdom

General information
- Architectural style: Victorian
- Location: Liverpool, North West England, England, United Kingdom
- Coordinates: 53°24′24″N 2°59′40″W
- Construction started: 1841
- Completed: 1847
- Inaugurated: 1846

Former UNESCO World Heritage Site
- Official name: Liverpool – Maritime Mercantile City
- Criteria: Cultural: (ii), (iii), (iv)
- Designated: 2004 (28th session)
- Reference no.: 1150
- Region: Europe and North America
- Delisted: 2021 (44th session)

Website
- www.liverpoolworldheritage.com

Liverpool Maritime Mercantile City is a former UNESCO designated World Heritage Site in Liverpool, England, that comprised six locations in the city centre including the Pier Head, Albert Dock and William Brown Street, and many of the city's most famous landmarks.

UNESCO received Liverpool City Council's nomination for the six sites in 2003 and sent ICOMOS representatives to carry out an evaluation on the eligibility for these areas to be given World Heritage Site status. In 2004, ICOMOS recommended that UNESCO should award Liverpool Maritime Mercantile City World Heritage Site status. Its inclusion by UNESCO was attributed to it being "the supreme example of a commercial port at a time of Britain's greatest global influence."

In 2012, the site was added to the List of World Heritage in Danger due to the proposed Liverpool Waters project. In 2017, UNESCO warned that the site's status as a World Heritage Site was at risk of being revoked in light of contemporary development plans, with English Heritage asserting that the Liverpool Waters development would leave the setting of some of Liverpool's most significant historic buildings "severely compromised", the archaeological remains of parts of the historic docks "at risk of destruction", and "the city's historic urban landscape [...] permanently unbalanced."

In 2021, Liverpool City Council's planning committee approved Everton F.C.'s new £500 million football stadium in Bramley-Moore Dock, within Liverpool Waters. This decision was ratified by the Secretary of State for Housing, Communities and Local Government, Robert Jenrick. Following this, UNESCO's World Heritage Committee voted to revoke the site's World Heritage status.

== Locations ==
The Liverpool Maritime Mercantile City comprised six separate locations throughout the centre of the city, each of which related to a different component and time in Liverpool's maritime history. The inscribed sites extended for approximately 4 km (2 1/2 miles) north-south along the city's waterfront and stretched approximately 1 km (1/2 mile) east-west. In total it covered an area of 136 ha (340 acres).

=== Pier Head ===
The Pier Head is the focal point of Liverpool's waterfront and is dominated by three of its most recognisable landmarks: The Liver Building, The Port of Liverpool Building and the Cunard Building. Collectively referred to as the Three Graces, they stand as a testament to the great wealth in the city during the late 19th and early 20th century when Liverpool was one of the most important ports in the world. Initially, plans existed to add a 'fourth grace' to area, named The Cloud and designed by Will Alsop; however, this fell through in 2004. Today, in what would have been its place, a new Museum of Liverpool opened on 19 July 2011. Behind the Port of Liverpool building is the art deco George's Dock Ventilation Tower, whose design is heavily influenced by Egyptian architectural styling. Also a part of the site is the old George's Dock wall, which dates from the late 18th century, as well as several memorials, including one built to honour the engineers who remained at their post as the RMS Titanic sank.

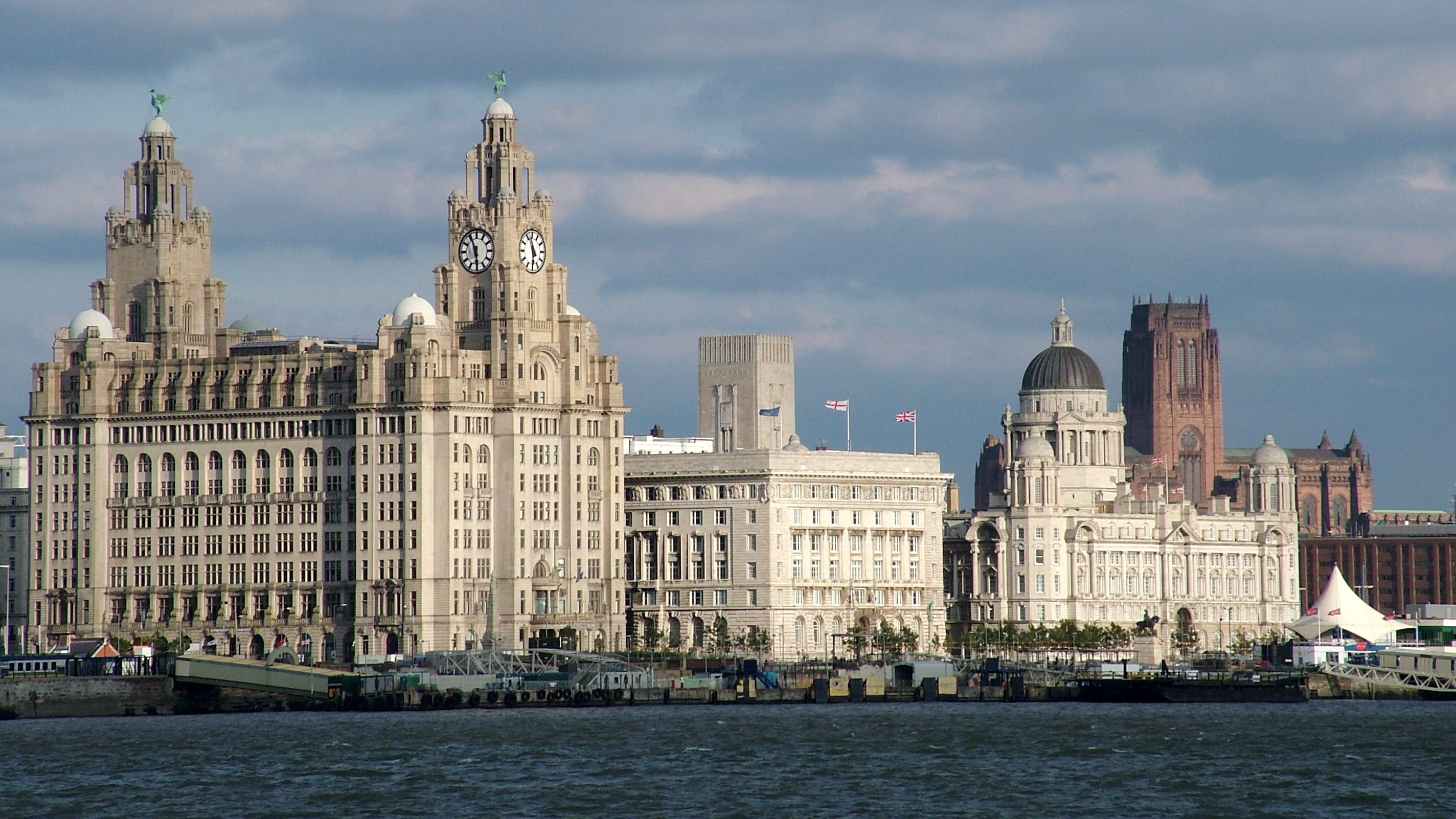
Liverpool Pier Head, with the Royal Liver Building, Cunard Building and Port of Liverpool Building

Listed buildings

- Royal Liver Building (Grade I)
- Port of Liverpool Building (Grade II*)
- Cunard Building (Grade II*)
- Cunard War Memorial (Grade II)
- George's Dock Ventilation Tower (Grade II)
- Monument of Edward VII (Grade II)
- Sir Alfred Jones Memorial (Grade II)
- Memorial to the Engine Room Heroes of the Titanic (Grade II)

=== Albert Dock ===
The Albert Dock is a complex of dock buildings and warehouses located to the south of the Pier Head. Designed by Jesse Hartley and Philip Hardwick and opened in 1846, the Albert Dock warehouses were the first in the world to be entirely fireproof, due to their construction from only iron, brick and stone, with no structural wood. The dock was home to many advances in docking technology including being the first to have hydraulic cranes. During World War II the buildings suffered significant damage and general docking decline in the city after the end of the war saw them fall rapidly into disrepair. In the 1980s the area underwent massive regeneration after the creation of the Merseyside Development Corporation and the complex was reopened to the public in 1984, as part of the tall ships festival. Today they form a focal point for tourism in the city, being home to Tate Liverpool, Merseyside Maritime Museum and The Beatles Story. At 1.25m sq ft, they also constitute the biggest single complex of Grade I listed buildings anywhere in the UK.

Listed buildings

- Albert Dock Warehouses:

- Warehouse A – Atlantic Pavilion (Grade I)
- Warehouse B – Britannia Pavilion (Grade I)
- Warehouse C – The Colonnades (Grade I)
- Warehouse D – Merseyside Maritime Museum (Grade I)
- Warehouse E – Edward Pavilion (Grade I)

- Dock Traffic Office (Grade I)
- Wapping Warehouse (Grade II*)
- Hydraulic Pumping Station East (Grade II)
- The Pier Master's House (Grade II)
- Canning Dock (Grade II)
- Canning Half-Tide Dock Retaining Walls (Grade II)
- Canning Graving Dock (Grade II)

- Cooperage (Grade II)
- Dock Master's Office (Grade II)
- Canning Island Sea Walls (Grade II)
- Gate piers to Albert Dock (Grade II)
- Three Gatemen's Huts at the entrance to Canning Dock (Grade II)
- Pumping Station, Mann Island (Grade II)
- Salthouse Dock (Grade II)
- Dukes Dock (Grade II)
- Albert Dock Sea Walls (Grade II)
- The Hartley Bridge (Grade II)
- The Rennie Bridge (Grade II)
- Hydraulic Tower at Wapping Dock (Grade II)
- Gatekeeper's Lodge at entrance to Wapping Dock (Grade II)
- Wapping Basin (Grade II)

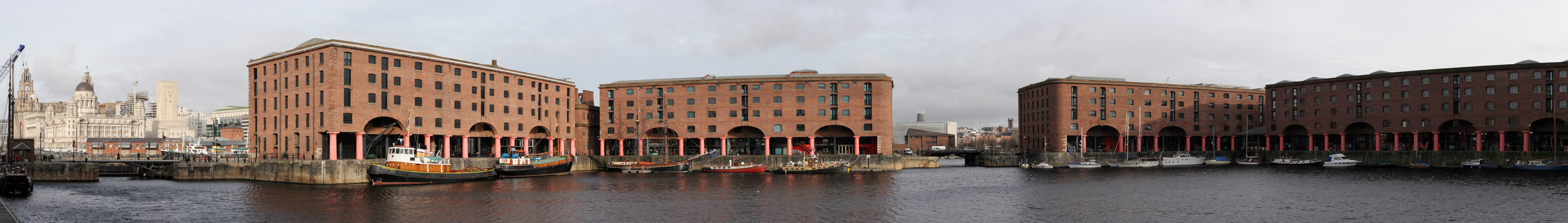
A panoramic view of the Albert Dock

=== Stanley Dock Conservation Area ===
The Stanley Dock Conservation Area is located to the north of the Pier Head and includes huge swathes of Liverpool's docking heartland. Within the site are several docks including Stanley Dock, Collingwood Dock, Salisbury Dock and Clarence Graving Dock; parts of the Leeds Liverpool Canal and associated canal locks; and many smaller features such as bridges, bollards and capstans. Two of the Clarence Graving Docks are notable as the oldest docks still in use in the city today, dating back to 1830, although their full development wasn't completed until 1848. Amongst the buildings in the area are the Victoria Clock Tower and Stanley Dock Tobacco Warehouse, one of the largest brick buildings in the world.

Listed buildings

- Warehouse on North Side of Stanley Dock (Grade II*)
- Bonded Tea Warehouse, Great Howard Street (Grade II)
- Clarence Graving Docks (Grade II)
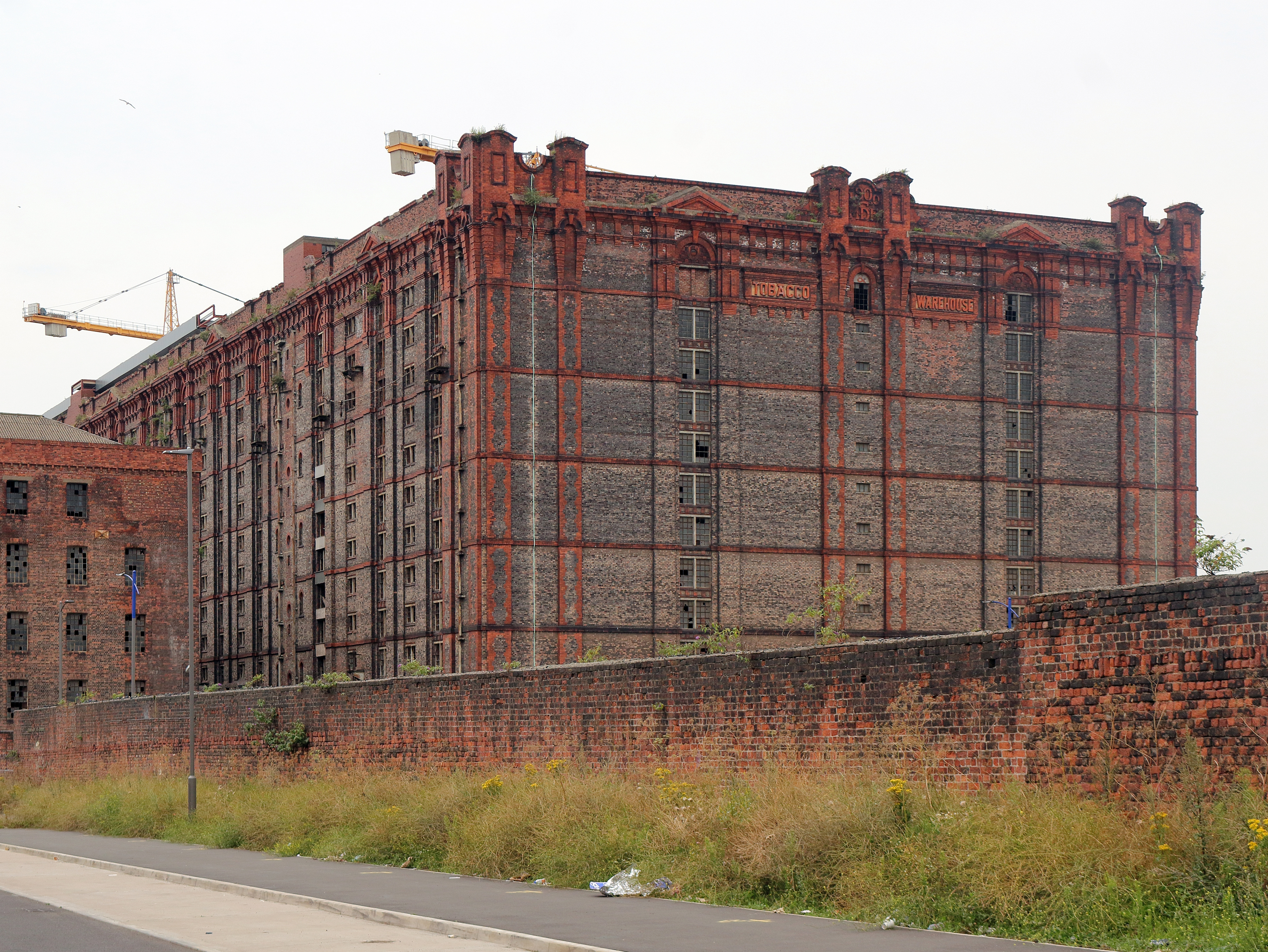
  Stanley Dock Tobacco Warehouse
- Boundary Wall from Collingwood Dock to Huskisson Dock (Grade II)
- The Dock Master's Office, Salisbury Dock (Grade II)
- Salisbury, Collingwood and Stanley, Nelson and Bramley-Moore Dock Retaining Walls (Grade II)
- Stanley Dock Tobacco Warehouse (Grade II)
- Entrances to Stanley Dock Complex (Grade II)
- Canal Locks between Stanley Dock and Leeds and Liverpool Canal (Grade II)
- Princes Dock Boundary Wall and Piers (Grade II)
- Salisbury, Collingwood and Stanley, Nelson and Bramley-Moore Dock Retaining Walls (Grade II)
- Hydraulic Tower West of North Stanley Warehouse (Grade II)
- Victoria Tower (Grade II)
- Warehouse South of Stanley Tobacco Warehouse (Grade II)
- Waterloo Warehouse (Grade II)

=== Duke Street ===
The RopeWalks site comprises the southwestern component of the Duke Street conservation area, as well as two warehouses on College Lane and Bluecoat Chambers on School Lane. The location was one of the first areas in the city to develop when Liverpool was an emerging port, with Bluecoat Chambers being the oldest surviving building in Liverpool city centre, dating back to 1715. Its proximity to the Old Dock, the world's first enclosed wet dock, meant it was the location of the city's first property speculators who built both warehousing and residential premises along Duke St, Hannover St, and Bold St. The area soon developed a cosmopolitan feel being home to various types of people including sea captains, merchants, traders and artisans. Today the area is known as Ropewalks, a reference to the large number of roperies present in the area when Liverpool was one of the busiest ports in the world during the 18th and 19th centuries.

Listed buildings

- Bluecoat Chambers (Grade I)
- 105 Duke Street (Grade II)
- The Bridewell (Grade II)
- Thomas Parr's House and Warehouse (Grade II)
- 12 Hanover Street (Grade II)
- 33 Argyle Street (Grade II)

=== Castle Street ===
This part of the WHS is focused around what would have previously been medieval Liverpool and includes Castle Street dominated by Trials Hotel at one end and the Town Hall at the other linking Old Hall Street by Exchange Flags, Victoria Street, Water Street and Dale Street. Today a centre for commercial activity in the city, the area was included due to the nature of its street development over three centuries and the grandeur of its architecture and monuments.

Listed buildings

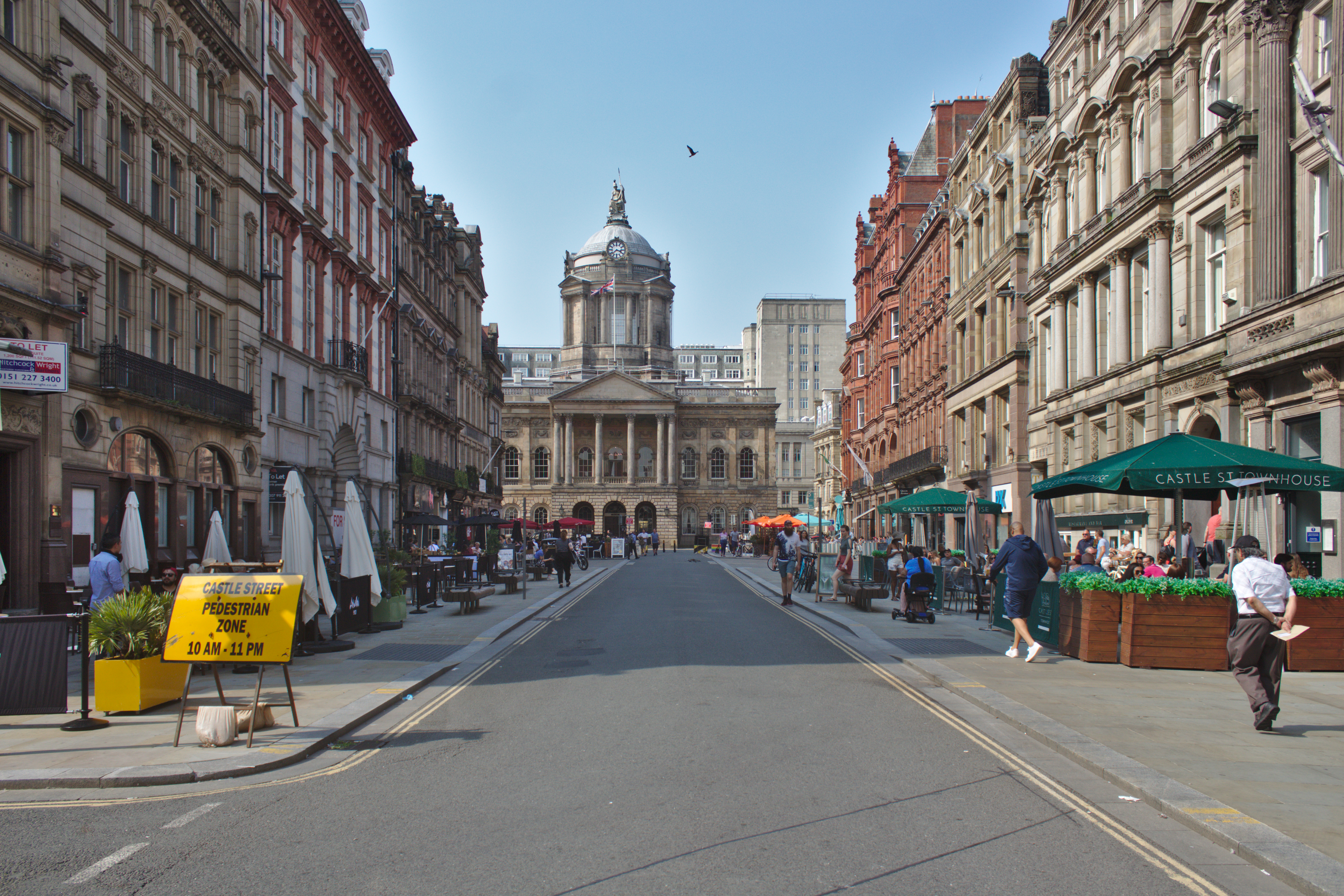
Castle Street with Liverpool Town Hall visible at the end of the road

- Liverpool Town Hall (Grade I)
- Bank of England Building, Castle Street (Grade I)
- Oriel Chambers, Water Street (Grade I)
- Trials Hotel, Castle Street (Grade II*)
- White Star Building (Albion House), James Street (Grade II*)
- Adelphi Bank, Castle Street (Grade II*)
- National Westminster Bank, Castle Street (Grade II*)
- Liverpool and London Globe Insurance Building, Dale Street (Grade II*)
- Royal Insurance Building, Dale Street (Grade II*)
- Municipal Buildings, Dale Street (Grade II*)
- Nelson Monument, Exchange Flags (Grade II*)
- Fowler's Buildings, Victoria Street (Grade II*)
- Tower Buildings, Water Street (Grade II*)
- Barclays Bank (Martins Bank Building), Water Street (Grade II*)
- Norwich Union Building, Castle Street (Grade II)
- Heywood's Bank, Brunswick Street (Grade II)
- Hargreaves Building, Chapel Street (Grade II)
- 48–50 Castle Street (Grade II)
- British and Foreign Marine Insurance Company Building, Castle Street (Grade II)
- Queen Insurance Building, Dale Street (Grade II)
- State Insurance Building, Dale Street (Grade II)
- Union Marine Buildings, Dale Street (Grade II)
- Rigby's Buildings, Dale Street (Grade II)
- The Temple, Dale Street (Grade II)
- Prudential Assurance Building, Dale Street (Grade II)
- Imperial Chambers, Dale Street (Grade II)
- Municipal Annexe, Dale Street (Grade II)
- Westminster Chambers, Dale Street (Grade II)
- City Magistrates Court, Dale Street (Grade II)
- 135–139 Dale Street (Grade II)
- Granite Buildings, Stanley Street (Grade II)
- Mersey Chambers, St Nicholas' Churchyard (Grade II)
- Monument to Queen Victoria, Derby Square (Grade II)
- Central Buildings, North John Street (Grade II)
- 18–22 North John Street (Grade II)
- Ashcroft Building, Victoria Street (Grade II)
- Union House, Victoria Street (Grade II)
- Jerome and Carlisle Buildings, Victoria Street (Grade II)
- India Buildings, Water Street (Grade II)
- General Accident Building, Water Street (Grade II)

=== William Brown Street ===
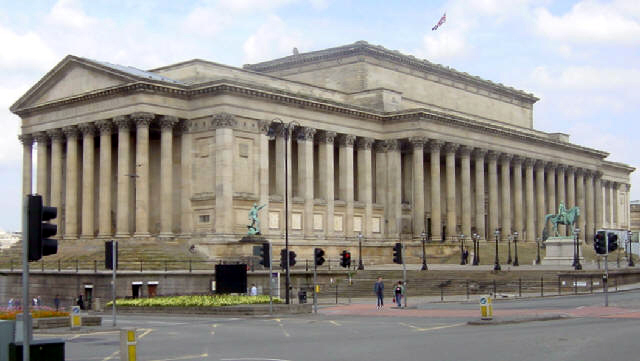
St George's Hall viewed from Lime Street

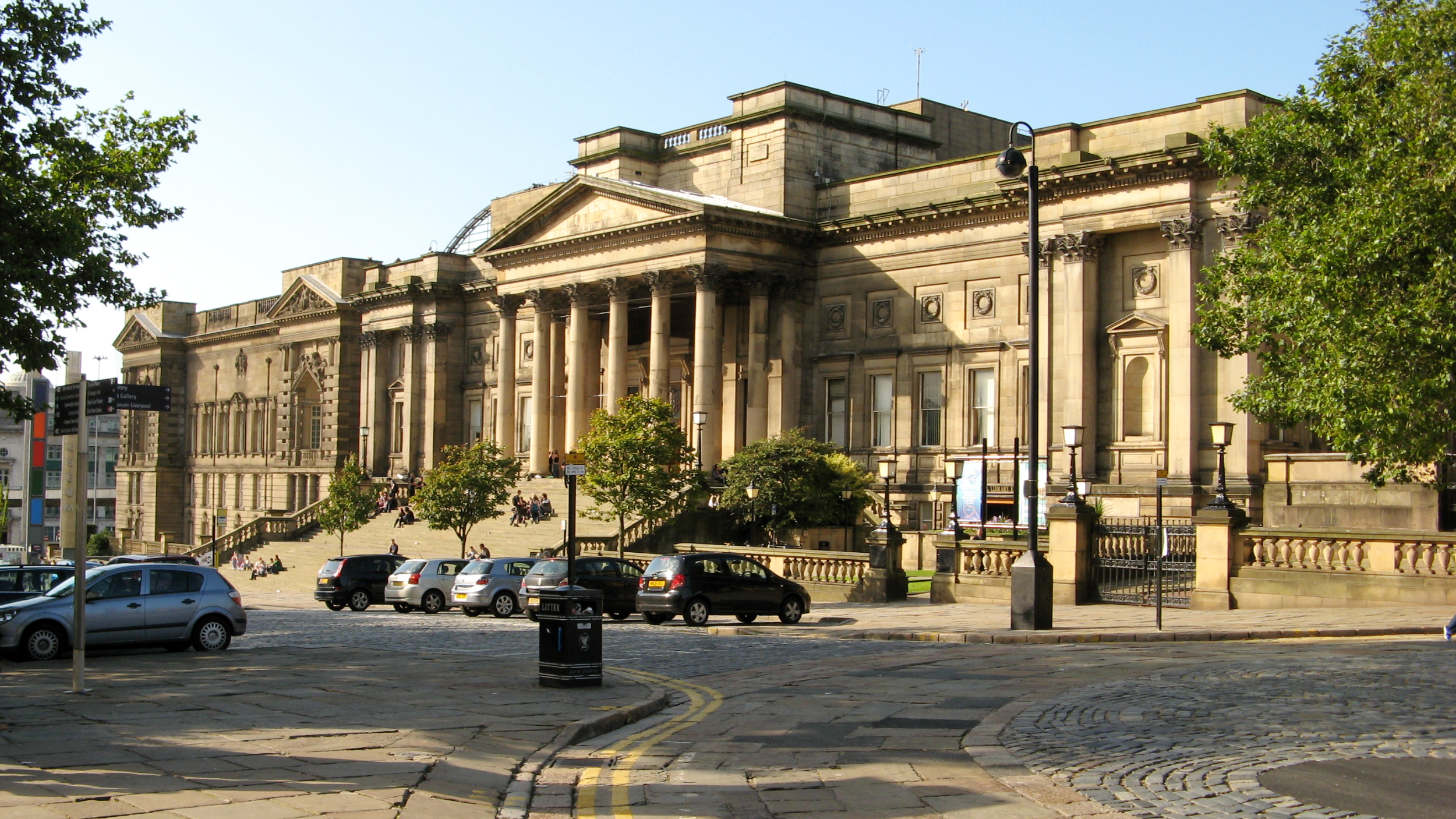
World Museum Liverpool

The William Brown street area is the central point for many of Liverpool's civic buildings forming a so-called cultural quarter. Amongst the buildings that are focal to this area are St George's Hall, Lime Street station, the Walker Art Gallery, the World Museum Liverpool, the former Great North Western Hotel and the entrance the Queensway Tunnel.

Listed buildings

- St George's Hall (Grade I)
- William Brown Library and Museum (Grade II*)
- Picton Reading Room and Hornby Library (Grade II*)
- County Sessions House (Grade II*)
- College of Technology and Museum Extension (Grade II*)
- The Wellington Memorial (Grade II*)
- The Steble Fountain (Grade II*)
- Lime Street Station (Grade II)
- North Western Hotel (Grade II)
- The Empire Theatre (Grade II)
- The Entrance to the Queensway Tunnel (Grade II)
- Liverpool Cenotaph (Grade I)
- St John's Gardens (Grade II)

- Four Recumbent Stone Lions (Grade II)
- Equestrian Statue of Prince Albert (Grade II)
- Equestrian Statue of Queen Victoria (Grade II)
- Statue of the Earl of Beaconsfield, Benjamin Disraeli (Grade II)
- Statue of Major-General Earle (Grade II)
- Statue of Alexander Balfour (Grade II)
- Statue of William Rathbone (Grade II)
- Statue of Sir Arthur Bower Forwood (Grade II)
- Statue of William Gladstone (Grade II)
- Statue of Monsignor James Nugent (Grade II)
- Statue of Canon T. Major Lester (Grade II)
- Statue honouring the King's Liverpool Regiment (Grade II)

== Inscription ==
Having received the nomination for the area in January 2003, the International Council on Monuments and Sites (ICOMOS) travelled to Liverpool in September of that year to carry out an evaluation on behalf of UNESCO. The ICOMOS evaluation analysed the city in relation to its nomination document, looking at four key areas: conservation, authenticity and integrity, comparative evaluation and outstanding universal value.

- Conservation – In terms of conservation status ICOMOS were happy that a wide range of buildings from the 18th through to 20th century were preserved within the city, despite two world wars and significant decline during the 1970s. However, they keenly stressed the importance of continued preservation suggesting that all future developments within the nominated areas are stringently monitored.
- Authenticity and integrity – ICOMOS were pleased with manner in which the nominated areas had maintained the majority of their historical integrity, despite some major regeneration and development projects since the Second World War. The urban fabric of the six sites ranged from the 18th to 20th century and the committee were happy that the city's street pattern provided a readable representation of different periods in Liverpool's history.
- Comparative evaluation – As part of their evaluation ICOMOS compared Liverpool's maritime history with that of other major ports throughout both the UK and wider world. They felt that Liverpool had values and qualities that set it apart from many other port cities both in terms of its maritime function and architectural and cultural significance.
- Outstanding universal value – In analysing Liverpool's Maritime Mercantile City in terms of its universal value, ICOMOS concurred with the local council that Liverpool was the 'supreme example of a commercial port at the time of Britain's greatest global influence'. In particular they noted the role the city played in the trans-Atlantic slave trade, the development of docking technology and railway transportation, and the attention given to cultural activities and architecture.

Upon completion of their evaluation, ICOMOS returned to UNESCO with the recommendation that the area be inscribed as a world heritage site. At the same time they made several recommendations regarding future preservation and development within the areas and their buffer zones. As a result, the Liverpool Maritime Mercantile City was inscribed as a World Heritage Site at the 28th session of the World Heritage Committee in 2004, under the cultural criteria ii, iii and iv:

- Criterion (ii): "Liverpool was a major centre generating innovative technologies and methods in dock construction and port management in the 18th and 19th centuries. It thus contributed to the building up of the international mercantile systems throughout the British Commonwealth."
- Criterion (iii): "The city and the port of Liverpool are an exceptional testimony to the development of maritime mercantile culture in the 18th and 19th centuries, contributing to the building up of the British Empire. It was a centre for the slave trade, until its abolition in 1807, and for emigration from northern Europe to America."
- Criterion (iv): "Liverpool is an outstanding example of a world mercantile port city, which represents the early development of global trading and cultural connections throughout the British Empire."

== Revocation of World Heritage status ==
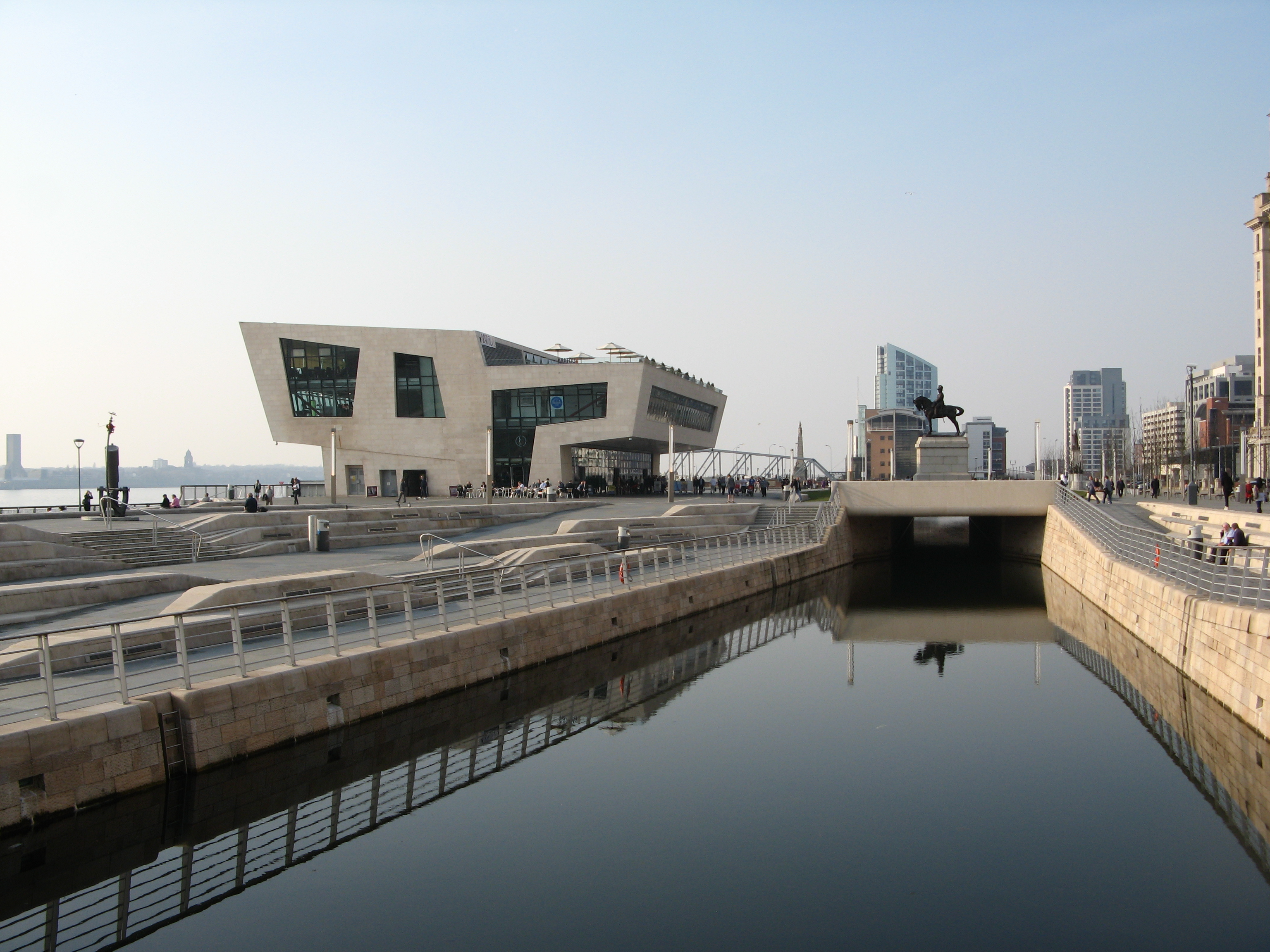
The Carbuncle Cup–winning Pier Head Ferry Terminal stands in front of the Three Graces. The structure is a 2009 addition to the waterfront.

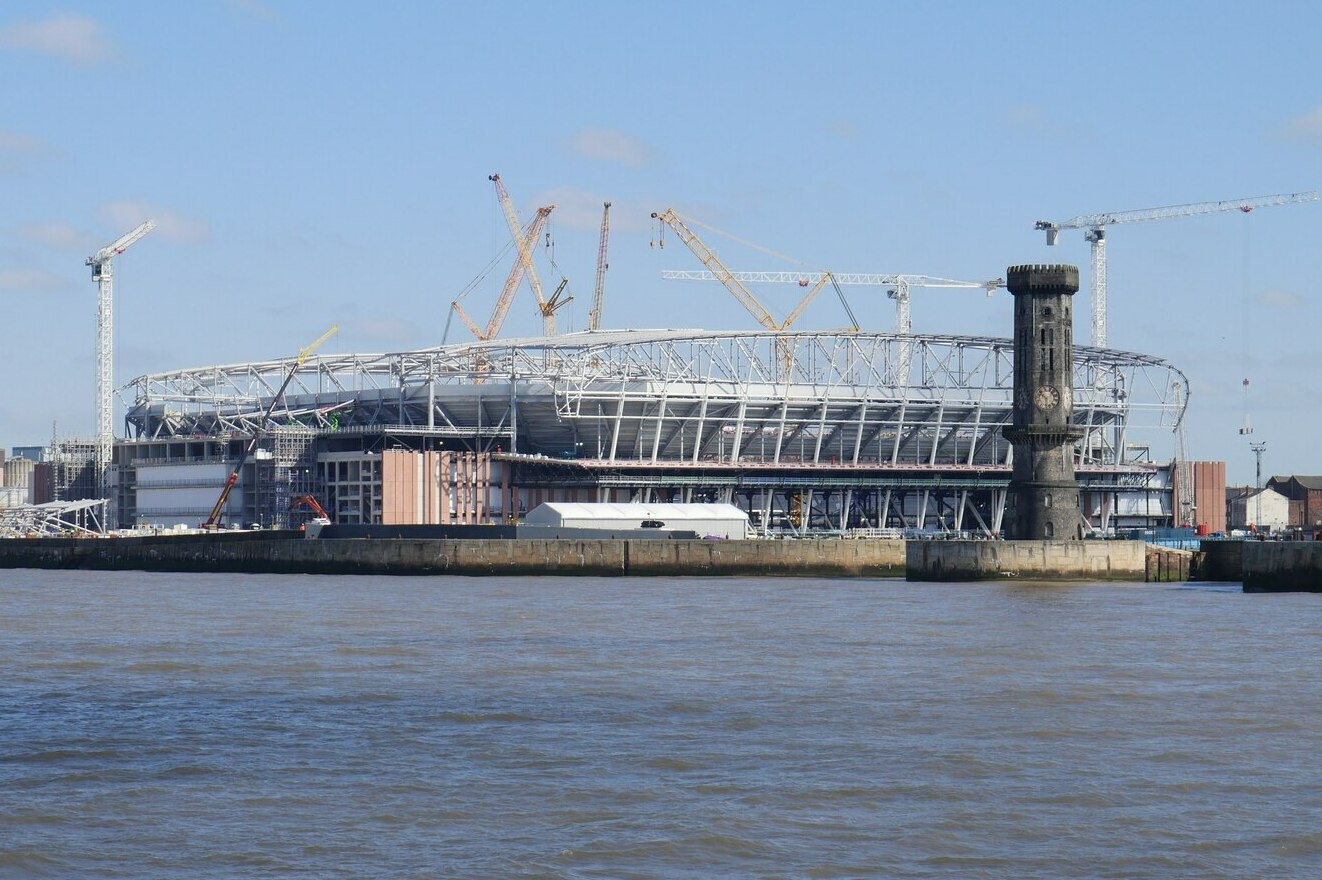
Everton F.C.'s new football stadium under construction in April 2023 with the Victoria Tower to the right.

In 2010, the Liverpool Waters development was proposed by The Peel Group as part of the Mersey Waters Enterprise Zone, and envisaged construction of several skyscrapers on the waterfront. Liverpool City Council granted the project planning permission in 2012, prompting UNESCO to warn of a "serious loss of historic authenticity" if the project proceeded, and to list the site as a World Heritage Site in Danger. Five years later, UNESCO stressed that the site risked being delisted in light of the proposed developments. In spite of such warnings, Liverpool City Council continued to approve modernist developments in the area, saying that the moratorium on construction of the piers is unpractical, and others suggested it being incompatible with UK law. In February 2021, Liverpool City Council's planning committee granted approval for Everton F.C.'s new £500 million football stadium to be built in the historic Bramley Moore Dock. Robert Jenrick, Secretary of State, decided not to intervene, effectively clearing the way for construction. The design of the stadium proved popular among the general populace, with support approaching 100%.

On 21 June 2021, just before the World Heritage Committee's 44th session in Fuzhou, China, the UN institution published a draft report recommending removal of Liverpool Maritime Mercantile City from its World Heritage Site list, citing non-compliance of UK and local authorities with UN recommendations and extensive modern development that adversely impacted the area. The next month, on 21 July, the World Heritage Committee voted 13–5, with 2 abstentions, to remove the status of World Heritage Site from Liverpool Maritime Mercantile City, citing "irreversible loss of attributes conveying the outstanding universal value of the property". It is the third site ever to be struck from the UNESCO list.

=== Reactions ===
The decision was met with condemnation from British government officials on various levels. The then Mayor of Liverpool, Joanne Anderson, described it as "incomprehensible" and stated that the World Heritage Site had benefitted from large investments which UNESCO had not appreciated. She also added that the city would consider an appeal against the decision. Similarly, Steve Rotheram, leader of the Liverpool City Region, criticised the vote as being unreflective of the situation at the place, and added that places like Liverpool should not choose between heritage status and development. A spokesman for the UK government also expressed disappointment and said that Liverpool still deserved the World Heritage Status.

Chris Capes, a representative of the Peel Group, which develops Liverpool Waters, insisted that despite delisting of Liverpool (which he considered very disappointing), regeneration and protection of the city's heritage could go together. Additionally, Michael Parkinson, a professor of the University of Liverpool who has worked on urban regeneration, wrote that Liverpool's docks were derelict and in need of revitalisation, and suggested that UNESCO employed double standards. He also cited an article which said that the heritage site with an area of 136 hectares and 380 buildings was probably too large.

Among conservation groups, the decision of UNESCO was met with mixed reactions. Gavin Davenport, chair of the Merseyside Civil Society, was critical of the decision and suggested that UNESCO come to Merseyside to see changes which he described as positive. Historic England, while it opposed the construction of the stadium on the piers, noted that it was disappointed by the draft decision when it was published, and reiterated its stance a month later, saying that Liverpool's heritage remained internationally important. On the other hand, the director of the Victorian Society was "saddened, but not surprised" by the vote and suggested that the local government officials' comments of conservation at a cost of regeneration were a false dichotomy, while hoping that the decision does not further impact the heritage. Save Britain's Heritage criticised the UK government's failure to intervene in Liverpool when UNESCO threatened the listing. Save Britain's Heritage stated, "We believe the UK government, as a signatory to the UN heritage treaty, could and should have done more to make the clear case for Liverpool's continued status – and given assurances to UNESCO that international heritage is safe in Britain's hands through tightening heritage and planning protections."

== See also ==
- Former UNESCO World Heritage Sites
