= Prudential Assurance Building, Liverpool =

Office building in Liverpool, Merseyside, England

Prudential Assurance Building
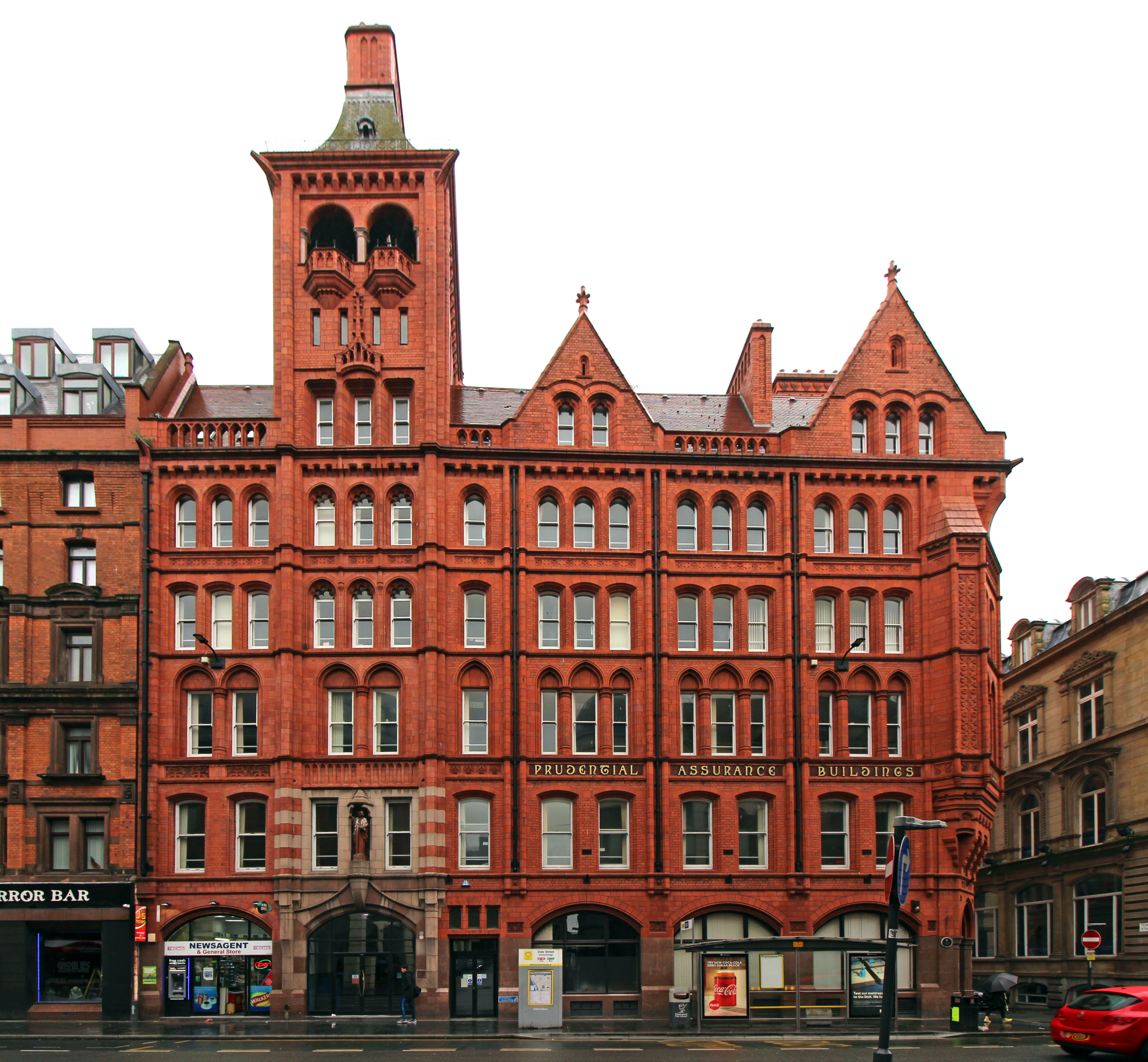
- Prudential Assurance Building
- Interactive map of the Prudential Assurance Building area

General information
- Architectural style: Victorian, Gothic revival
- Location: Dale Street, Liverpool, England
- Coordinates: 53.4078°N 2.9887°W
- Construction started: 1885
- Completed: 1886
- Client: Prudential Assurance

Design and construction
- Architect: Alfred Waterhouse

The Prudential Assurance Building is a Grade II listed, Victorian Gothic revival style office building located on Dale Street in the centre of Liverpool, England.

It was designed by local architect Alfred Waterhouse (also noted for the Natural History Museum and Manchester Town Hall) and was constructed in 1885–6. The building was commissioned by the country's leading insurance provider Prudential as its new regional offices in Liverpool. It was part of a series of buildings commissioned by the Prudential from Waterhouse, notably the firm's large headquarters in London, now known as Holborn Bars. Like the other Prudential commissions, the building is noted for its use of red architectural terracotta and brick. It has a tower which was added to the building by the architect's son Paul Waterhouse in 1905. Gold lettering above the first floor windows near the corner read Prudential Assurance Buildings, and Roman numerals at the same level on the corner bay commemorate the date of completion, 1886.

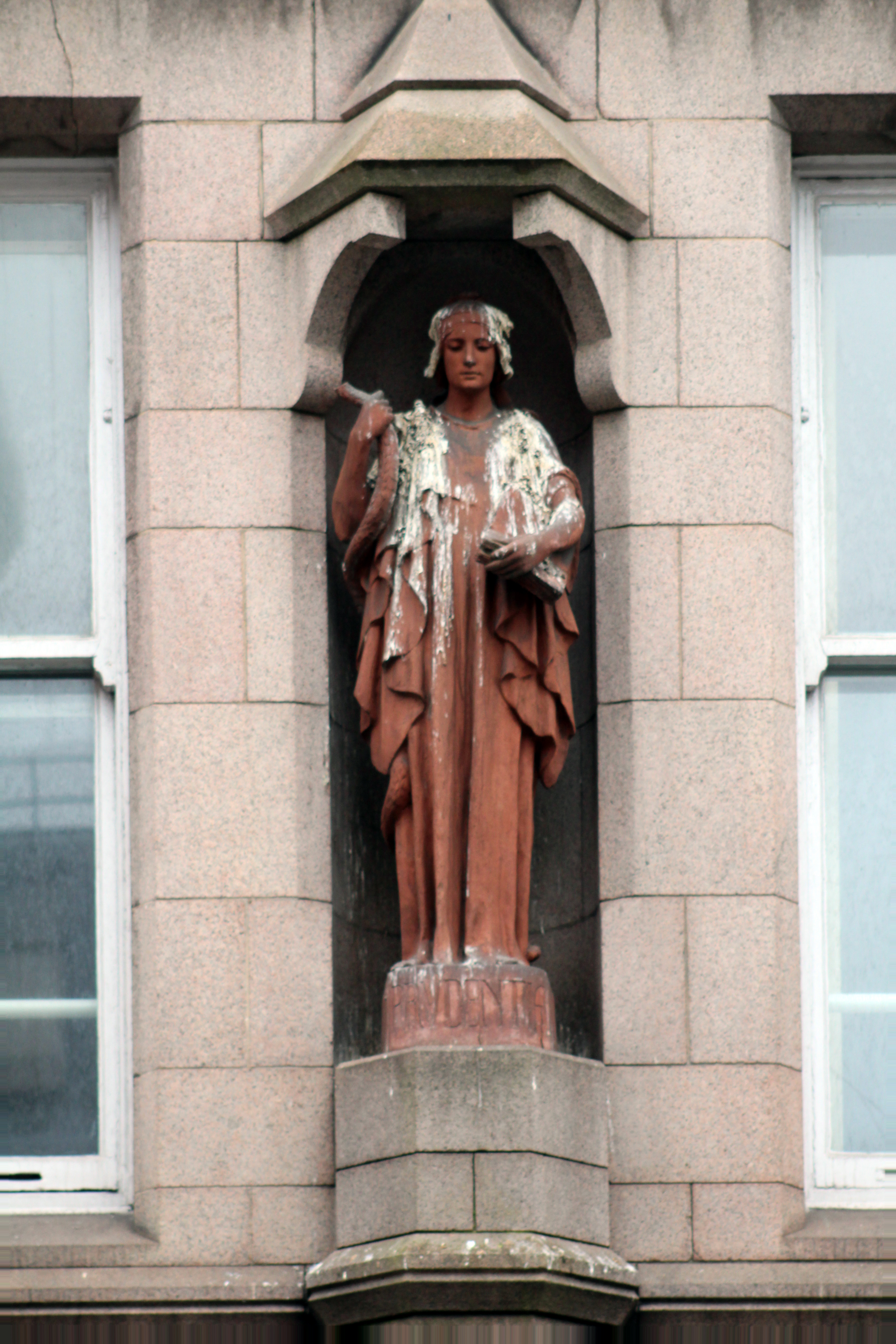
Statue of the virtue of Prudence above the main entrance

Alongside the likes of Liverpool Town Hall, Bank of England Building, India Buildings, White Star Building and the Tower Buildings. The Prudential Assurance Building is amongst the most architecturally important buildings in the commercial district which is one of the six areas that constitute Liverpool's status as a UNESCO World Heritage Site.

It is currently used by Her Majesty's Courts and Tribunal Service (Social Security and Child Support Tribunal).

== See also ==
- Architecture of Liverpool
- Liverpool Maritime Mercantile City
- Listed buildings in Liverpool
- Dale Street
- List of commercial buildings by Alfred Waterhouse
