= Listed buildings in Liverpool =

Historic buildings in Liverpool, England

There are over 2500 listed buildings in Liverpool, England. A listed building is one considered to be of special architectural, historical or cultural significance, which is protected from being demolished, extended or altered, unless special permission is granted by the relevant planning authorities.

Of these buildings, 27 are classified as Grade I (buildings of outstanding architectural or historic interest) and 85 are classified as Grade II* (particularly significant buildings of more than local interest). The remainder are classified as Grade II. The city has been described by English Heritage as England's finest Victorian City.

The wide range and depth of architectural styles represented in Liverpool had been recognised by UNESCO, with six areas throughout the city centre being designated as a World Heritage Site in 2004. The areas, collectively known as the Liverpool Maritime Mercantile City were added in recognition of the city's role in the development of International trade and docking technology. However, this designation was revoked in July 2021, following developments to the northern docks of the site in the Liverpool Waters project.

Due to the way in which buildings are listed by English Heritage and due to the large number of buildings within the city, they have been subdivided in Grade I, II* and II buildings lists, with the Grade II buildings being further split up by postcode.

== Listed buildings in the United Kingdom ==
Within the United Kingdom, a listed building is a building or structure that is of special architectural, historical or cultural significance. Listed building status is used widely in the country to protect historic sites and has been applied to around half a million buildings. A listed building may not be demolished, extended or altered without special permission from the local planning authority (who typically consult the relevant central government agency, particularly for significant alterations to the more notable listed buildings).

Although most structures appearing on the lists are buildings, other structures such as bridges, monuments, sculptures, war memorials, and even milestones and mileposts may also be listed. Ancient, military and uninhabited structures (such as Stonehenge) are sometimes instead classified as scheduled monuments and protected by much older legislation whilst cultural landscapes such as parks and gardens are currently "listed" on a non-statutory basis.

== Architecture of Liverpool ==
Liverpool has a wide variety of architectural styles represented within the city, dating from as far back as the 13th century, right up to modern contemporary styles. Much of the urban fabric of Liverpool that exists today dates from the last 200 years, the period during which the city developed into a major port city within the United Kingdom.

There are over 2,500 listed buildings in Liverpool (of which 27 are Grade I listed and 85 are Grade II* listed). The city also has a greater number of public sculptures than any other location in the United Kingdom aside from Westminster and more Georgian houses than the city of Bath. This richness of architecture has subsequently seen Liverpool described by English Heritage, as England's finest Victorian city.

The value of Liverpool's architecture and design was recognised in 2004, when several areas throughout the city were declared a UNESCO World Heritage Site. Known as the Liverpool Maritime Mercantile City, the sites were added in recognition of the city's role in the development of International trade and docking technology. The status was revoked in July 2021.
