= James Picton =

British architect (1805–89)

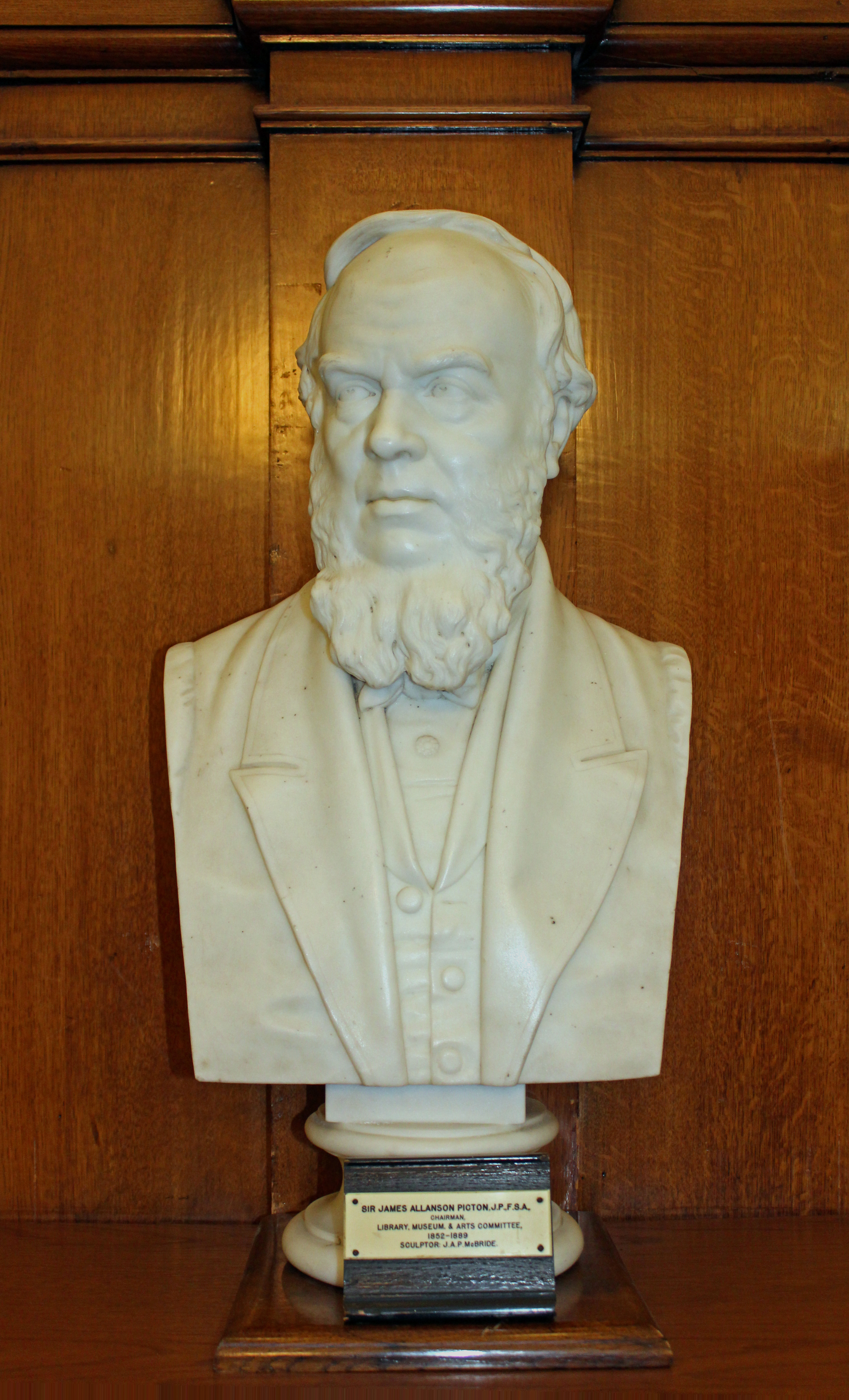
- Bust of Picton on the north side of the Picton Reading Room
- Born: James Allanson Picton; 2 November 1805; Liverpool, Lancashire, England
- Died: 15 July 1889 (aged 83)
- Occupation: Architect

Sir James Allanson Picton (2 December 1805 – 15 July 1889) was an English antiquary and architect who played a large part in the public life of Liverpool. He took a particular interest in the establishment of public libraries.

James Picton was born in Liverpool to William Picton, a joiner and timber merchant, and entered his father's business at the age of 13. He later joined the office of Daniel Stewart, an architect and surveyor, eventually taking over the business. Picton designed some important buildings in Liverpool, including the corn exchange and Richmond Buildings, an office block, now demolished.

He became a member of the town council in 1849, and in 1851 a member (and later chairman) of the Wavertree local board. He started to campaign for a public library for the borough and in 1852 an Act of Parliament was obtained to allow the raising of a penny rate for a public library and museum. William Brown provided the buildings for the library and museum in 1860. In 1879 the corporation added to the library a reading room which was called the Picton Reading Room, modelled on the British Museum Reading Room. Picton was the first chairman of the library and museum committee, which was founded in 1851, and he remained in this position until his death.

Picton married Sarah Pooley. Their son also James Allanson Picton eschewed his father's architectural practice and was eventually elected as MP for Leicester.

== Architectural works ==
=== Key ===
Grade	Criteria
Grade II*	Particularly important buildings of more than special interest.
Grade II	Buildings of national importance and special interest.

=== Works ===
Name	Location	Photograph	Date	Notes	Grade
8–10 Brougham Terrace	West Derby Road, Liverpool; 53.4143°N 2.9609°W		c. 1830	The remaining part of a row of houses.	(Note: Number 8 Brougham Terrace is Grade II* listed due to its use as the first fully functioning mosque in England, while 9 & 10 are Grade II listed.)
Holy Trinity Church	Hoylake, Merseyside	—	1833	A new church in Neo-Norman style, since demolished.	—
Congregational Church	Crow Lane, Newton-le-Willows, Merseyside	—	1842	A plain simple church with lancet windows, a wheel window, and twin porches facing the road. It was later used by the United Reformed Church, and closed in 2005, with planning to convert it into residential accommodation.	—
Chorlton Hall	Backford, Cheshire; 53.2392°N 2.8891°W	—	1845–46	Extension of an 18th-century house for James Wickstead Swan.	II
Sandy Knowe	Wavertree, Liverpool; 53.4030°N 2.9135°W		1847	A red sandstone house built for himself in Jacobean style. It has an L-plan, with an octagonal turret at the junction. The house also has shaped gables, finials, and mullioned windows.	II
11 Dale Street (Note: For the same building at this address, the National Heritage List states it was built in 1868, and calls it the Union Marine Buildings.)	Liverpool; 53.4076°N 2.9902°W		1859	An office built for the Queen Insurance Company. It has six bays facing Dale Street and five bays on Hackings Hey, and is in three storeys with a basement. There are round-headed windows in the lower and top floors. The windows in the middle storey have architraves with pilasters. Between the middle and top storeys are balustraded balconies. At the summit of the building is a heavy cornice with curved machicolations.	II
Hargreaves Building	5 Chapel Street, Liverpool; 53.4073°N 2.9942°W		1859	This was built as the headquarters of the banker Sir William Brown. It has three storeys and a basement, and is designed in the style of a Venetian palazzo. Between the heads of the ground floor windows are roundels containing carvings of people involved with the exploration of the Americas. Between 1895 and 2001 it was used by the Liverpool Racquet Club, and has since been converted into a hotel and restaurant.	II
St Bartholomew's Church	Arborfield, Berkshire; 51.4043°N 0.9118°W		1863	A new church in Gothic Revival style replacing an older church nearby. It is in flint with stone dressings and a tiled roof. The church has a west tower with a broach spire, and an apsidal chancel.	II
Richmond Baptist Church	Breck Road, Liverpool; 53.4245°N 2.9554°W		1864	A chapel in brick with stone dressings and a slate roof. It has two storeys. The lower storey of the entrance front has three arched doorways, above which are four round-headed windows, and a rose window in the gable. There are more round-headed windows along the sides in two tiers. Inside the chapel there are galleries on all four sides.	II
Mercantile and Exchange Bank	48–50 Castle Street, Liverpool; 53.4057°N 2.9907°W		1864	A tall, narrow building, with red granite columns framing the ground floor windows, and lunettes in the first floor.	II
The Temple	22A and 24 Dale Street, Liverpool; 53.4077°N 2.9890°W		1864–65	This was built as an office for Sir William Brown. It originally had two ranges leading from the back of the building; the east range has been demolished, and the west range converted into flats. It is in three storeys plus a basement and attic, and has a Mansard roof. There are seven bays facing Dale street, and a curved bay leading round into Princess Street.	II
Fowler's Buildings	1–3 Temple Lane and 3–9 Victoria Street, Liverpool; 53.4067°N 2.9883°W		1865–69	This was built as offices for the Fowler brothers, who were produce dealers. The main front on Victoria Street has three storeys and a basement, and is in nine bays. On the main floor are polished granite columns, and above the window surrounds are "curvy". Behind, along Temple Lane, is a five-storey, 14-bay warehouse in polychromic brick.	II*
Picton Clock Tower	Wavertree, Liverpool; 53.3982°N 2.9158°W		1884	Erected by Picton as a memorial to his wife. It now stands surrounded by a roundabout. The tower is in three stages with a clock face in each of its four sides. At the top is a lead cupola with a short spire. Around the base are four iron lamp posts.	II
Lock up	Childwall Road, Wavertree, Liverpool; 53.3983°N 2.9144°W		Undated	Picton added a pyramidal slate roof and a weathervane to a lock-up built in 1796, which stands at a confluence of roads. It is an octagonal stone structure in two storeys.	II
Corn Exchange	Fenwick Street, Liverpool; 53.4055°N 2.9920°W	—	Undated	Replaced by a new building in 1953–59.	—
