= Fruit Exchange Building =

Fruit Exchange
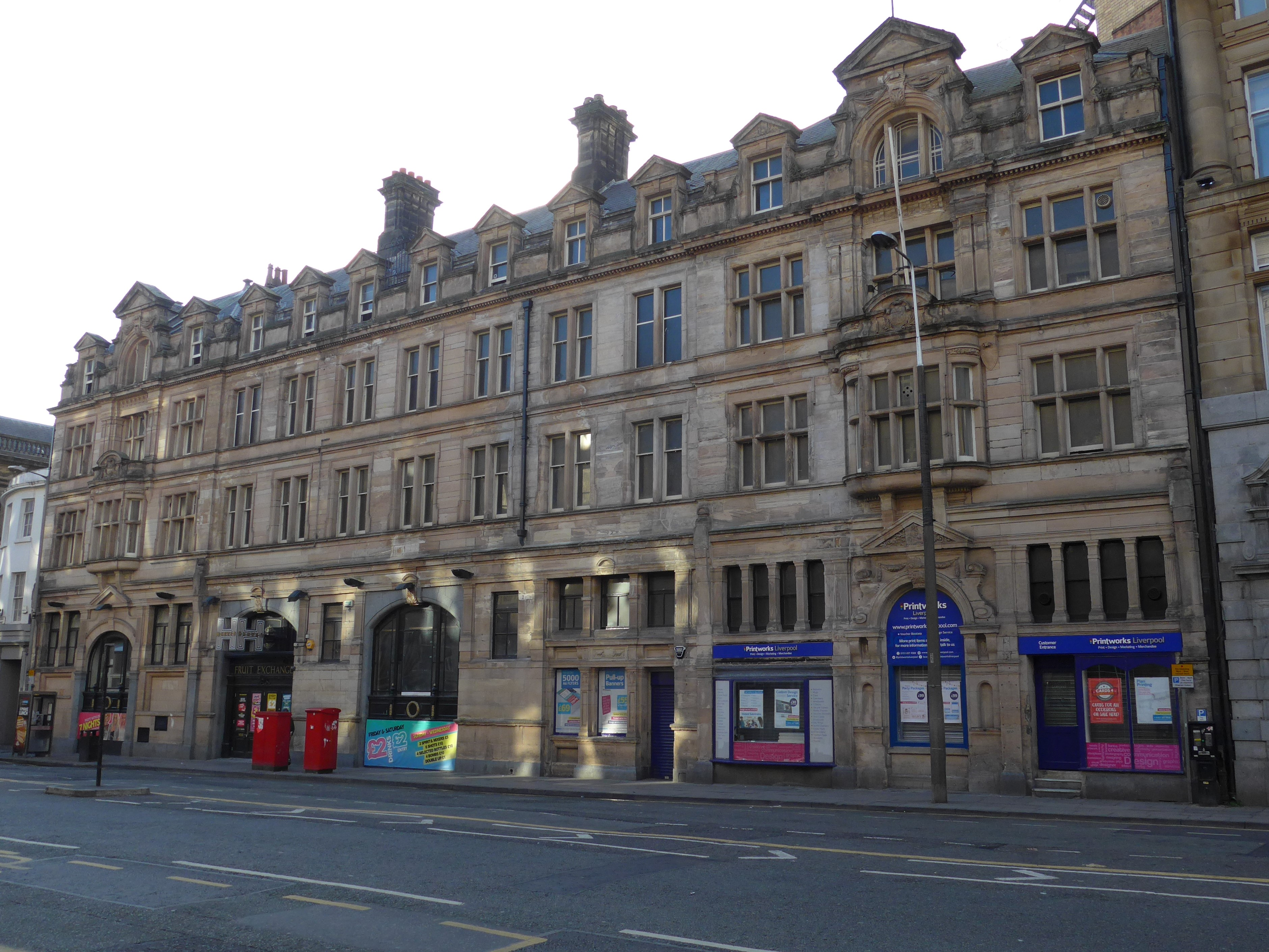
- Fruit Exchange Building, Victoria Street. The edge of the Produce Exchange Building can be seen on the right
- Interactive map of the Fruit Exchange area

General information
- Type: Former railway depot and fruit exchange
- Architectural style: Flemish Renaissance
- Location: 10-18 Victoria Street, Liverpool, England, United Kingdom
- Coordinates: 53.4068°N 2.9902°W
- Completed: c.1888

Design and construction
- Designations

Listed Building – Grade II
- Official name: Fruit Exchange
- Designated: 8 April 2008
- Reference no.: 1392539

The Fruit Exchange Building is Grade II listed building on Victoria Street in Liverpool, England.

== History ==
Constructed around 1888, the building was originally designed as a railway depot for London & North Western Railway . From the 1860s, Victoria Street was the location of many offices and commercial buildings that meant it played a key part during the growth of Liverpool. During the later part 19th century, the street became home to fruit and produce dealers and their warehouses, aided by its proximity to the docks and Liverpool Exchange railway station.

The building was converted from a railway depot into a fruit exchange in 1923. It was situated next to the Produce Exchange Buildings, which was also a converted railway depot. The building and was still in use as a fruit exchange in the late 1960s. The office and exchange hall parts of the building have lain empty for many years and have been part of the Liverpool Echo 'Stop the rot' campaign.

The warehouse part of the building that backs onto Mathew Street originally held Eric's Club and later the Rubber Soul bar. During its four-year lifespan, Eric's hosted local bands such as Dead or Alive, Echo & the Bunnymen and Orchestral Manoeuvres in the Dark as well as international acts like U2, Talking Heads and The Ramones.

Plans to convert the front part of the building into an 85-bedroom hotel were approved by Liverpool City Council in 2020.

== Description ==
The building is split into two halves; the front block having been offices and the back block containing the exchange halls and offices. The ground floors and warehouses have been converted into a pub / bar, but the main exchange hall remains relatively untouched.
