= The Temple, Liverpool =

Office building in Liverpool, England

The Temple
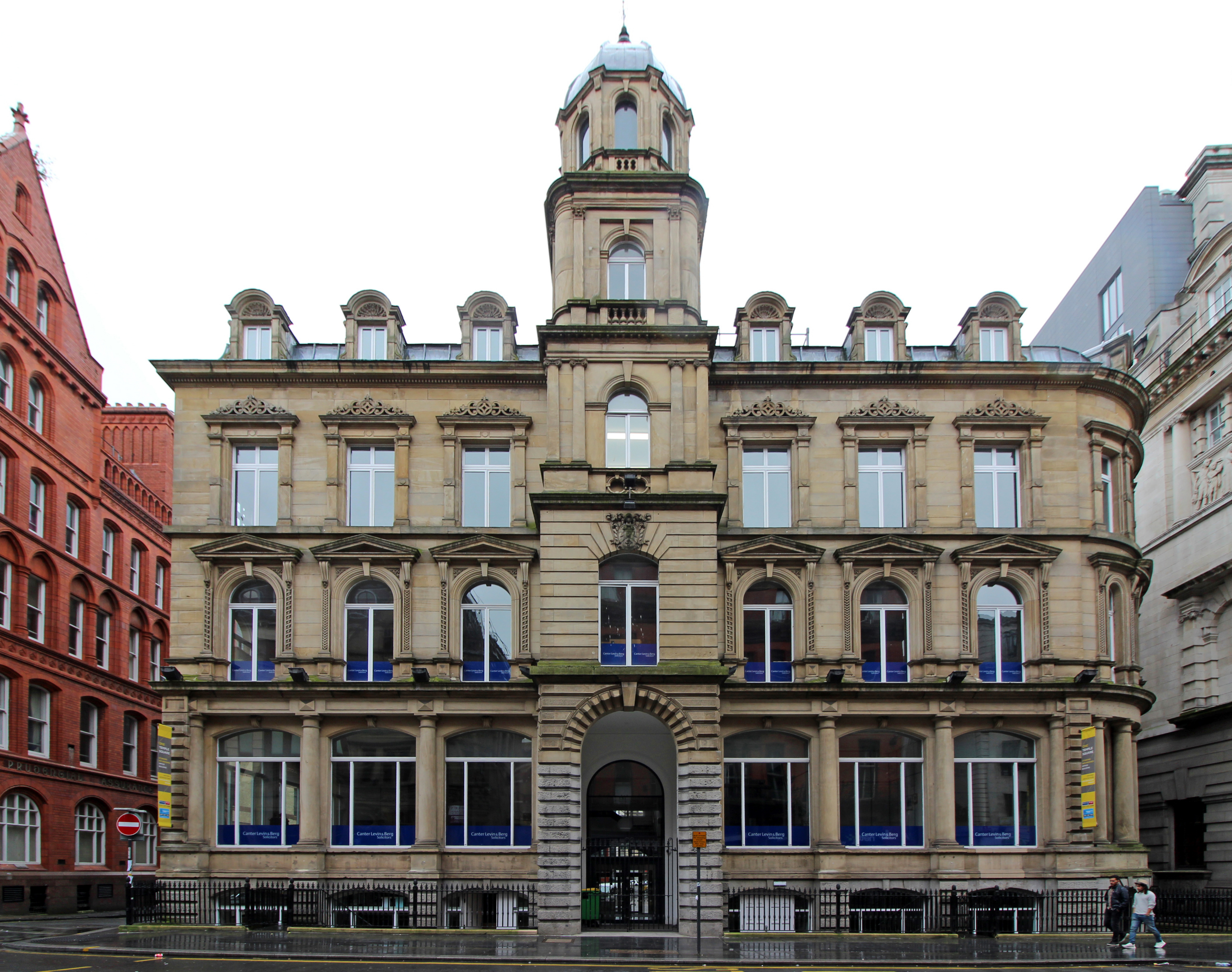

- Location in Liverpool
- 53.4077°N 2.9890°W
- Location: 22A and 24 Dale Street, Liverpool, Merseyside, England
- OS grid reference: SJ 344 906

History
- Built: 1864–65
- Built for: Sir William Brown

Site notes
- Architect: Sir James Picton

Listed Building – Grade II
- Designated: 14 March 1975
- Reference no.: 1206475

The Temple is an office building at 22A and 24 Dale Street, Liverpool, Merseyside, England.

== History ==
The Temple was constructed in 1864–65. It was built for the banker Sir William Brown and designed by Sir James Picton. Leading from the rear of the building were two brick ranges with large windows. The west range has been converted into flats; the east range has been demolished, and was replaced in 2001 by a new building.

== Architecture ==
The building is in stone, with a grey granite basement and a lead roof. It has three storeys plus a basement and an attic. The entrance front on Dale Street has seven bays and a curved bay leading round into Princess Street on the left corner. The surround to the round-arched entrance is rusticated. Over the entrance is a carving of four hands, clasped together, and the words "Harmony Becomes Brothers". Also in the ground floor is a Tuscan colonnade, a panelled frieze and a cornice. The first floor is rusticated, and above the entrance is a segmental-headed window surmounted by arms. Above this on the second floor is a round-headed window with flat Ionic pilasters. Rising over this is a two-stage tower with a lead cupola and finials. The building has a Mansard roof. It is recorded in the National Heritage List for England as a designated Grade II listed building.

== See also ==
- Grade II listed buildings in Liverpool-L2
- Architecture of Liverpool
