= Victoria Street, Liverpool =

Road in Liverpool, England

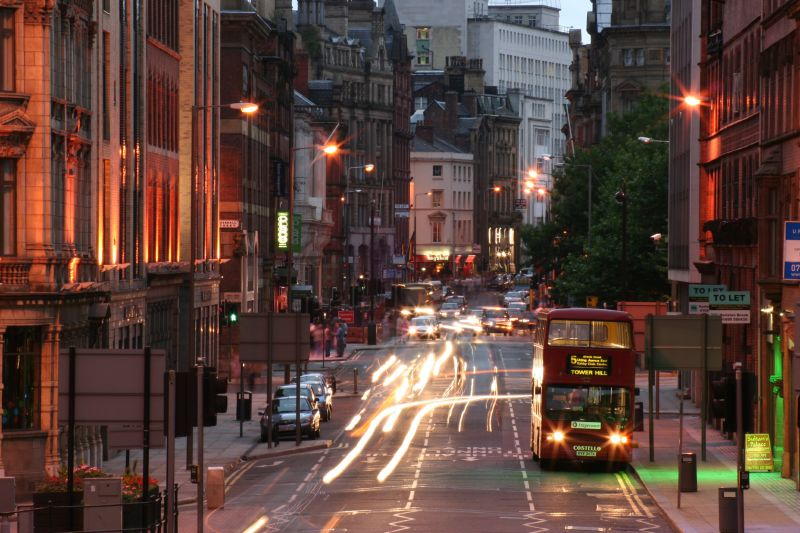
- Victoria Street, 2008

- Location within Liverpool
- Location: Liverpool city centre
- Postal code: L2
- Coordinates: 53.4082°N 2.9863°W

Other
- Known for: Offices, hotels, restaurants, bars

Victoria Street is a road in Liverpool, England. Situated in the city centre, it runs between the Queensway Tunnel entrance to Cook Street.

== History ==
Dating back to the 1860s, the street's offices and commercial buildings meant that it played a key part during the growth of Liverpool. During the 19th century, the street became home to fruit and produce dealers, warehouses, offices and banks, aided by its proximity to the docks and Liverpool Exchange railway station.

At one point, three railway companies had depots on the street. The Midland Railway built a depot on the corner where Victoria Street meets Crosshall Street in 1872. Designed by local architect Henry Sumners of Culshaw and Sumners, the building was later extended towards Peter Street in 1878. In the mid-1990s the building was converted into a convervation centre for National Museums Liverpool, known as the National Conservation Centre. The Fruit Exchange Building was built c.1888 in as a rail depot before being converted into a fruit exchange in 1923. During its heyday, hundreds of people would attend auctions to purchase fruit that had been shipped into Liverpool from around the world. Adjacent to it, the Produce Exchange Buildings was built in 1902 as a produce warehouse for the Lancashire and Yorkshire Railway before being converted into offices.

Liverpool's main post office opened on Victoria Street in 1899, having previously been in Custom House at Canning Dock. The building was damaged during the May 1941 blitz and had the upper floors removed. The post office moved to another location during the 20th century and after being derelict for a while the building was converted into a shopping centre called the Metquarter.

Renowned Liverpool nightclub, Eric's Club opened on Victoria Street in 1976 before later moving to Mathew Street. During its four-year lifespan it hosted local bands such as Dead or Alive, Echo & the Bunnymen and Orchestral Manoeuvres in the Dark as well as international acts like U2, Talking Heads and The Ramones.

== Listed buildings ==
Victoria Street contains ten listed buildings. These include:

- Fowler's Buildings
- Fruit Exchange Building
- National Conservation Centre
- Produce Exchange Buildings
