= Rigby's Buildings =

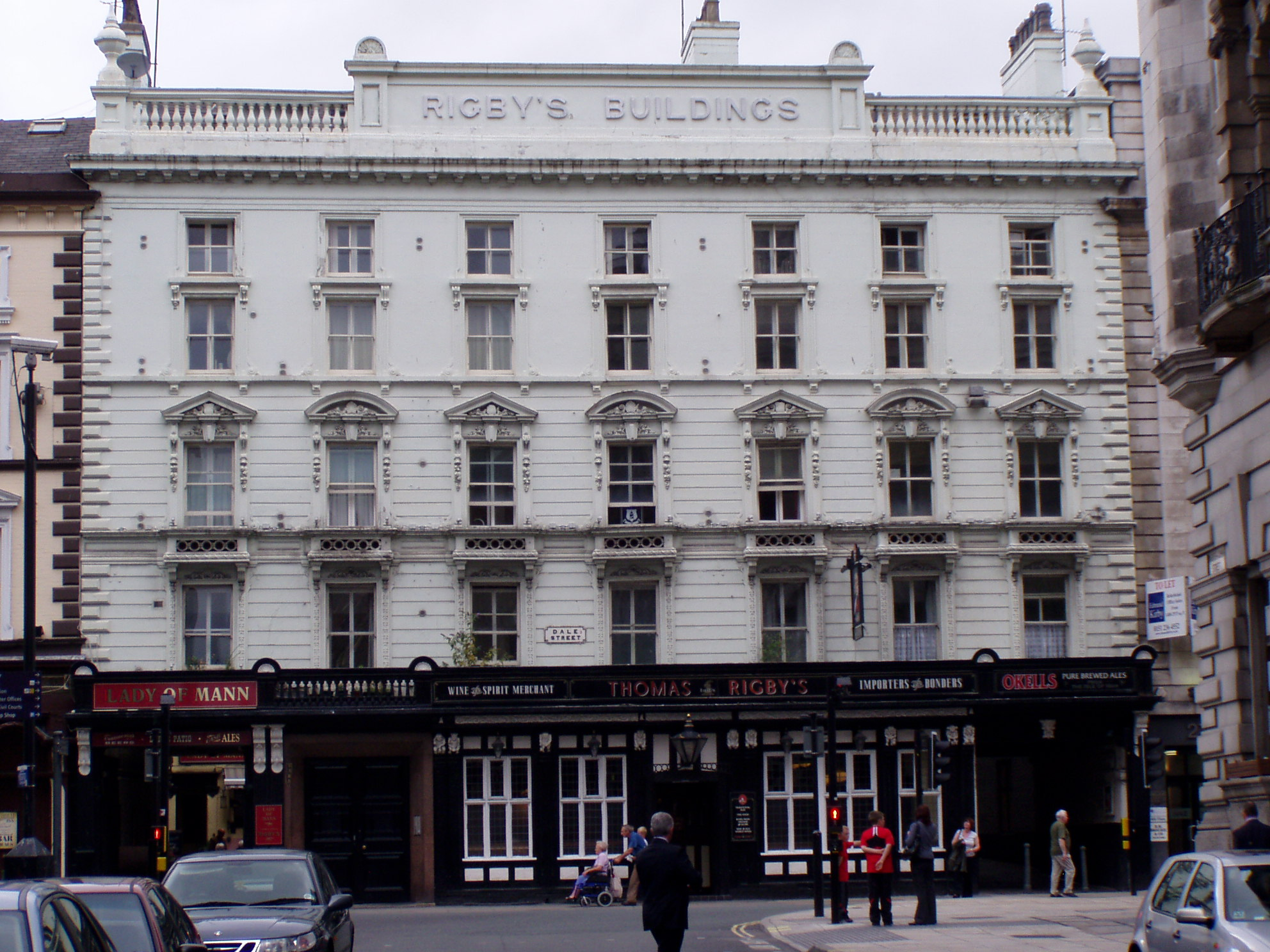
- Rigby's Buildings

- Location in Liverpool
- 53.4077°N 2.9898°W
- Location: 21–25 Dale Street, Liverpool, Merseyside, England
- OS grid reference: SJ 343 906

History
- Built: 1728
- Rebuilt: c. 1850

Site notes
- Restored: 1865

Listed Building – Grade II
- Designated: 14 March 1975
- Reference no.: 1206420

Rigby's Buildings is at 21–25 Dale Street, Liverpool, Merseyside, England. It contains offices and, on its ground floor, a public house.

== History ==
The building carries the date 1726, but the present building on the site probably dates from about 1850. It takes its name from Alderman Thomas Rigby, who came from humble beginnings, and made a fortune from public houses and hotels. He acquired the building in about 1852, at which time it was known as Atherton Buildings. Rigby bought the building mainly for its yards and warehouse at the rear for use in his business. At this time it had a plain frontage, and in 1865 Rigby added the stucco façade with its wooden carved grotesques in imitation-medieval style. As of 2003 its ground floor is occupied by a public house named Thomas Rigby's, and the upper floors are used as offices.

== Architecture ==
Rigby's Buildings is in five storeys, with a front of seven bays. The ground floor has a 19th-century frontage containing leaded light windows over which is a continuous fascia. In the upper storeys all the windows are four-pane sashes. The windows in the first floor have balustrades, and decorated architraves and lintels. The windows in the second storey are the most elaborate. They have balconies, decorated architraves, and pediments of different types. Along the top of the building runs a cornice with a parapet. At the centre of the parapet is the inscription "Rigby's Buildings", and at the sides of this are balustrades. Standing on the parapet at its corners are urns. Rigby's Buildings is recorded in the National Heritage List for England as a designated Grade II listed building.

== See also ==
- Grade II listed buildings in Liverpool-L2
- Architecture of Liverpool
