= Fowler's Buildings, Liverpool =

Listed building in Liverpool, England

Fowler's Buildings
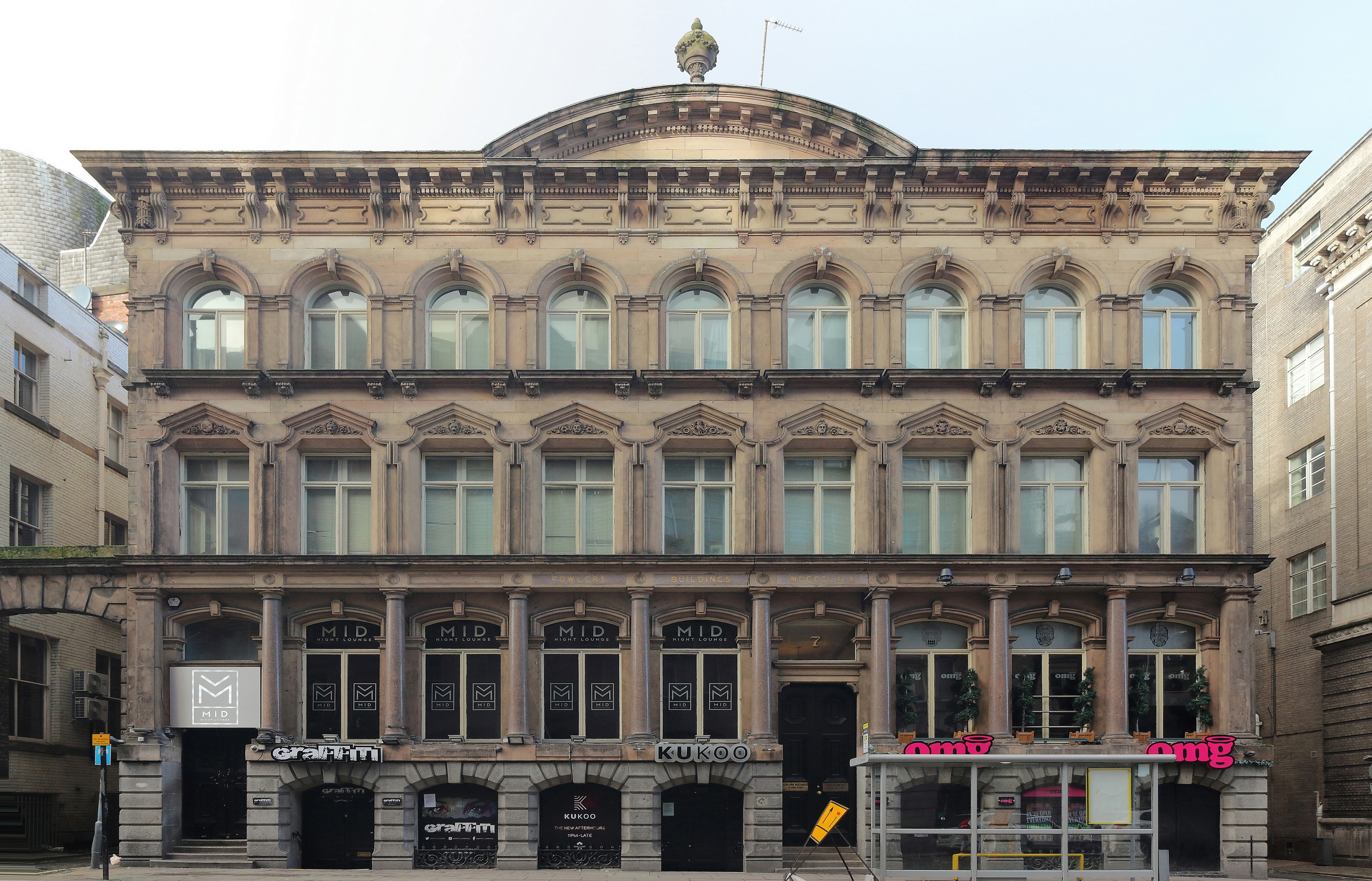
- Fowler's Buildings, Victoria Street frontage
- Interactive map of the Fowler's Buildings area

General information
- Location: Victoria Street and Temple Lane, Liverpool, England
- Coordinates: 53.4067°N 2.9883°W
- Construction started: 1865
- Completed: 1869

Design and construction
- Architect: J. A. Picton
- Designations

Listed Building – Grade II*
- Official name: Fowler's Buildings
- Designated: 14 October 1974
- Reference no.: 1063294

Fowler's Buildings is an office building and warehouse located at 3–9 Victoria Street and 1–3 Temple Lane in Liverpool, England. They were constructed in two phases between 1865 and 1869, for the Fowler brothers, who were produce dealers, and were designed by the local architect J. A. Picton. The whole structure is recorded in the National Heritage List for England as a designated Grade II* listed building.

The style of the Victoria Street frontage is freely adapted from Italian Renaissance architecture. It has three storeys and a basement, and is in nine bays. The basement is rusticated. Along the exterior of the principal floor are eight polished granite Tuscan columns. The floor above this has windows with "curvy" surrounds, which are almost Baroque in style. Along the top floor are round-headed windows. At the summit of the building is a cornice, and a segmental pediment surmounted by an urn. The warehouse extends behind the offices along Temple Lane, and is constructed in polychromic brick. It is in five storeys with a basement, and has 14 bays.

== See also ==
- Architecture of Liverpool
- Grade II* listed buildings in Liverpool – City Centre
- Grade II* listed buildings in Merseyside
