= Produce Exchange Buildings, Liverpool =

Produce Exchange
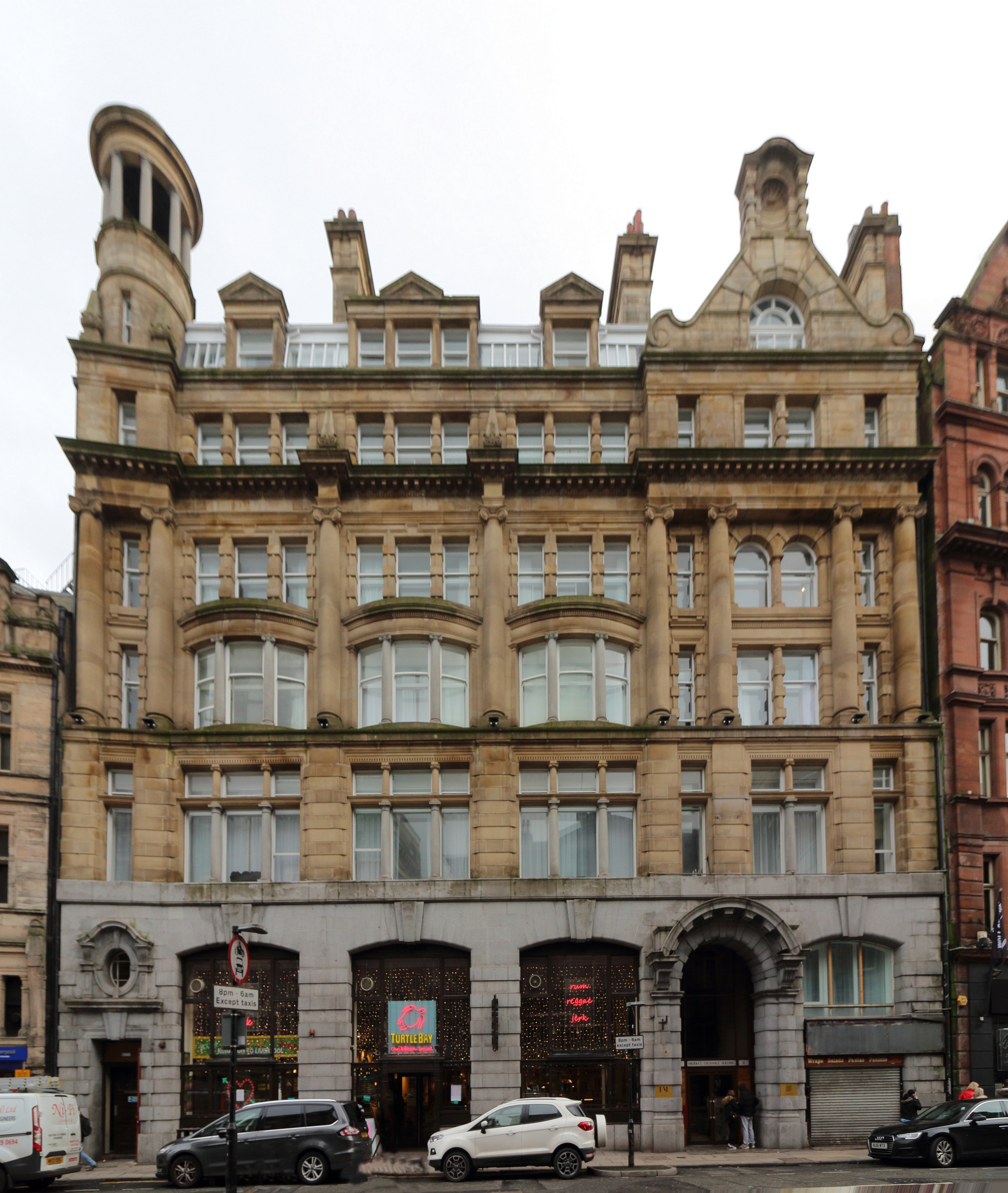
- Produce Exchange Buildings, as seen in 2019

General information
- Type: Former railway depot and produce exchange, now restaurants and residences
- Location: 6A-8 Victoria Street, Liverpool, England, United Kingdom
- Coordinates: 53.4064°N 2.9883°W
- Completed: 1902
- Designations

Listed Building – Grade II
- Official name: Produce Exchange Buildings
- Designated: 18 June 1985
- Reference no.: 1062566

The Produce Exchange Buildings is Grade II listed building on Victoria Street in Liverpool, England.

== History ==
Constructed in 1902, the building was originally designed as a railway depot for Lancashire and Yorkshire Railway. From the 1860s, Victoria Street was the location of many offices and commercial buildings that meant it played a key part during the growth of Liverpool. During the later part 19th century, the street became home to fruit and produce dealers and their warehouses, aided by its proximity to the docks and Liverpool Exchange railway station.

At some point after its construction for the railway, the building was converted into a produce exchange. It was situated next to the Fruit Exchange Building, which was also a converted railway depot. After being used as a produce exchange, the building was later host to the NatWest bank, which closed around 2008, after which the building lay empty.

Planning permission was successfully granted by Liverpool City Council in 2015 for the conversion of the Mathew Street side of the building into two restaurants and 58 apartments to be built on the Victoria Street side. Restaurant chain 'Turtlebay' opened a venue in November 2019.

== Description ==
The ornate south-side of the building faces out on to Victoria Street, whilst the utilitarian rear of the building is on Mathew Street. The south-side of the building retains many of its original features, such as mosaic floors, frosted, stained glass windows and a grand central staircase.

The building contains a war memorial to service personnel who died during World War 1. The plaque states:

IN MEMORY OF THE MEN OF LIVERPOOL / PROVISION TRADE WHO FELL IN THE GREAT WAR / 1914 1919
