= Liverpool Racquet Club =

Liverpool Racquet Club was a gentlemen's club in Liverpool, Merseyside, England. It was founded in 1874 to provide facilities for gentlemen to play real tennis and other racquet games. They selected a site in Upper Parliament Street for their building, which opened in 1877. Originally it provided two racquet courts, and an American bowling alley. Soon after this, a new dining room and a billiards room were added. In 1894 further alterations were made, including the conversion of the bowling alley into two fives courts, one for Eton Fives and the other for Rugby Fives. By 1900 the Rugby fives court was being used as a squash court. In 1913 a covered lawn tennis court was added. By 1936 all the courts were being used for squash. Residential accommodation was added at that time. The building was damaged during the Second World War, during which time the Club gave hospitality to officers of the Royal Navy. On 6 July 1981 the Club building was destroyed in the Toxteth riots. Following this, the Club bought the lease of Hargreaves Building in Chapel Street, and converted it for their purposes. This was sold in 2001, and the building became the Racquet Club Hotel.
