= Hargreaves Building =

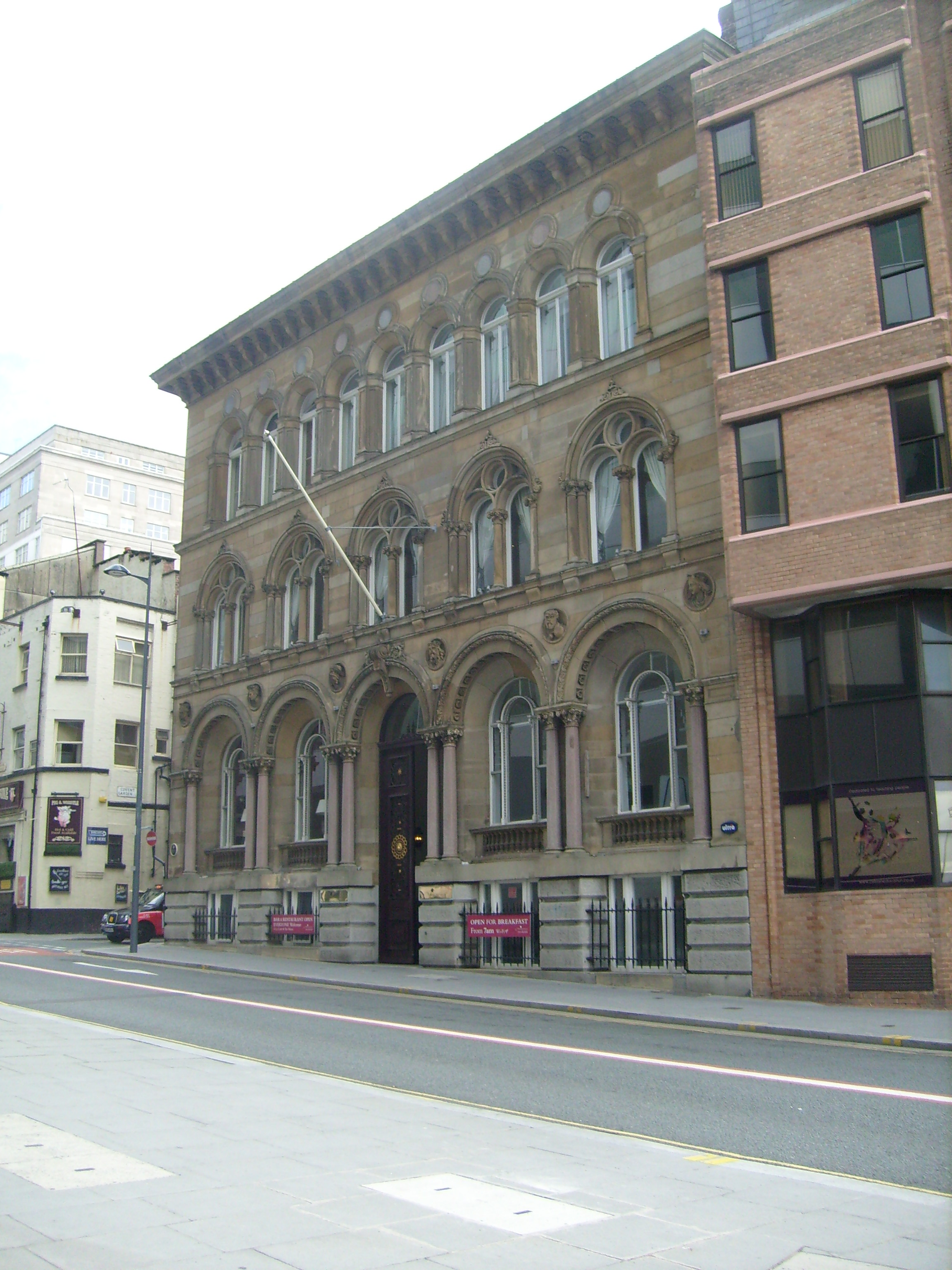
- Hargreaves Building

- Location in Liverpool
- 53.4073°N 2.9942°W
- Location: Chapel Street, Liverpool, Merseyside, England
- OS grid reference: SJ 340 905

History
- Built: 1859
- Built for: Sir William Brown

Site notes
- Architect: Sir James Picton

Listed Building – Grade II
- Designated: 12 July 1966
- Reference no.: 1068348

Hargreaves Building is a former bank in Chapel Street, Liverpool, Merseyside, England. It originated as the headquarters of the Brown Shipley Bank, continued as offices when the bank moved to London, was converted for use by the Liverpool Racquet Club after the Toxteth riots, and later became a hotel and restaurant.

== History ==
The building is dated 1859, and was designed by the local architect Sir James Picton. It was designed for the banker Sir William Brown as his headquarters. The name Hargreaves was the surname of Brown's son-in-law who ran his Liverpool business. The building continued to be the headquarters of the Brown Shipley Bank until 1888, when it moved to London. It continued to be used as offices until the 1980s.

Following the Toxteth riots of 1981, when their building in Upper Parliament Street was destroyed, the Liverpool Racquet Club were looking for new premises. At this time the lease for Hargreaves Building was available for sale, and the trustees of the Club negotiated a 150-year lease from Liverpool City Council. The building was converted for the Club, and it re-opened on 20 May 1985. It contained a dining room, bar, and lounge, a billiards room, two squash courts, a small swimming pool, a gym and changing facilities, and rooms for overnight accommodation. However, by 2001 the membership of the Club had declined and the lease was sold. It has since been converted into a hotel and restaurant named the Racquet Club Hotel and Ziba Restaurant.

== Architecture ==
The building is constructed in ashlar, with a granite basement and a slate roof. It is in three storeys plus a basement. The architectural style is that of a Venetian palazzo, but employing Borromini's round-arched false-perspective window reveals of Palazzo Barberini, Rome. It has five bays facing Chapel Street, and seven bays facing Covent Garden. In the ground floor are round-headed windows flanked by paired columns. Between the heads of the double-light windows are roundels containing carvings of people involved with the exploration of the Americas. These include Christopher Columbus, Isabella I, Bermejo (a Spanish "adventurer"), Vespucci, Cortez, Queen Anacaona of Cuba, and Francisco Pizarro. In the second floor are smaller two-light windows under round arches, separated by Ionic colonettes. The top floor contains even smaller two-light windows under round arches between panelled pilasters. Along the top of the building is a frieze and a cornice. The building is recorded in the National Heritage List for England as a Grade II listed building, having been designated on 12 July 1966.

== See also ==
- Grade II listed buildings in Liverpool-L2
- Architecture of Liverpool
