= Mersey Chambers =

Building in Liverpool, Merseyside, England, UK

Coordinates: 53°24′25″N 2°59′38″W

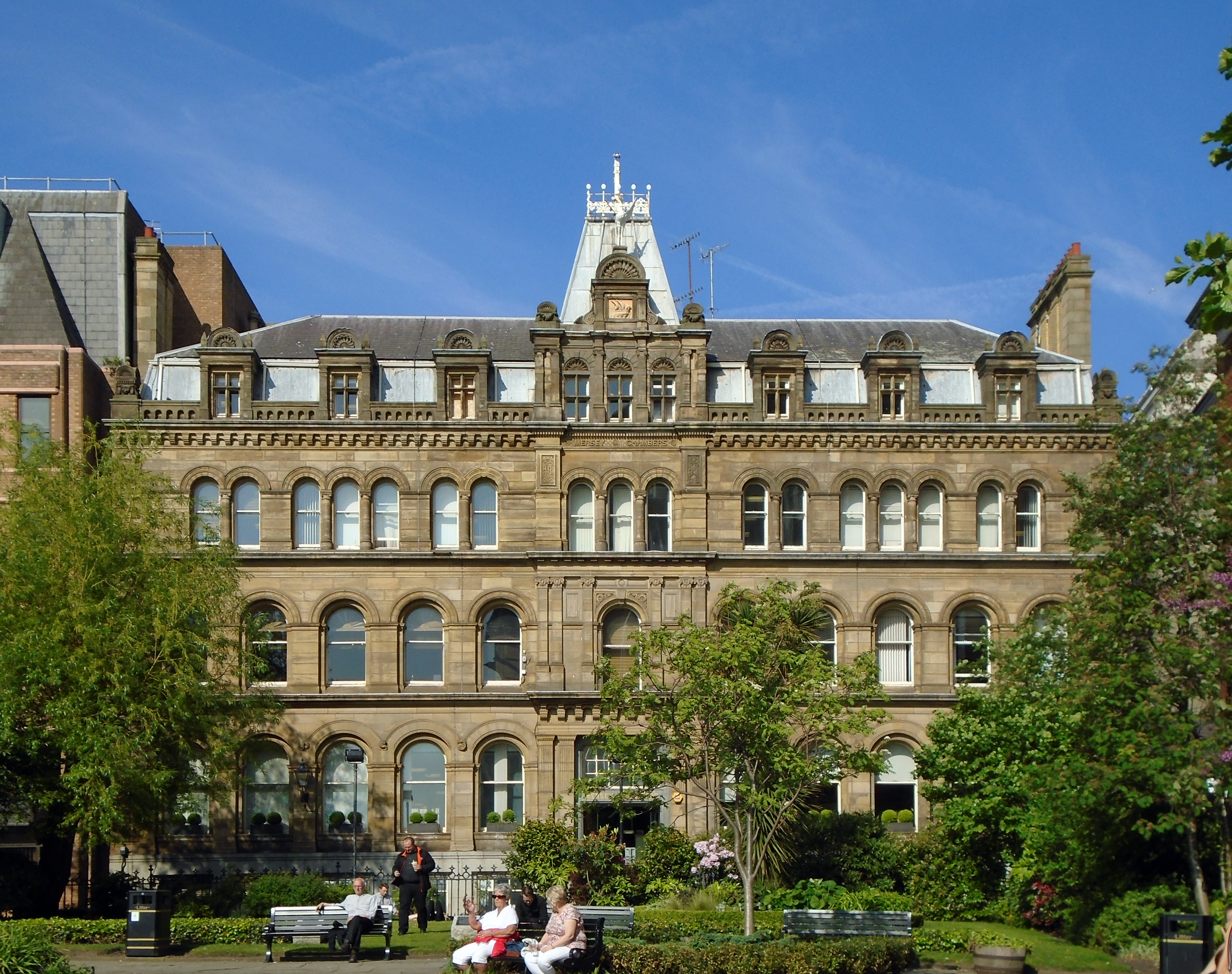
Mersey Chambers from St. Nicholas' churchyard

Mersey Chambers was built in 1878 for the Harrison Shipping Line in Liverpool, England. It was designed by G.E. Grayson. It is a Grade II listed building.

It fronts St. Nicholas' churchyard, which was laid out as a public garden in 1891 in memory of James Harrison, a partner in the company.

The rear elevation to Covent Garden is a functional design with rows of oriel windows to admit maximum light. Inside, the offices are arranged around a glazed court.

There is a panelled boardroom of around 1920, in classical style.

At the top of the building sits the 'third Liver bird', a smaller version of its more famous relatives.

== See also ==
Architecture of Liverpool
