= Bank of England Building, Liverpool =

Historic building in Liverpool, England

Coordinates: 53.4062°N 2.9905°W

Bank of England Building
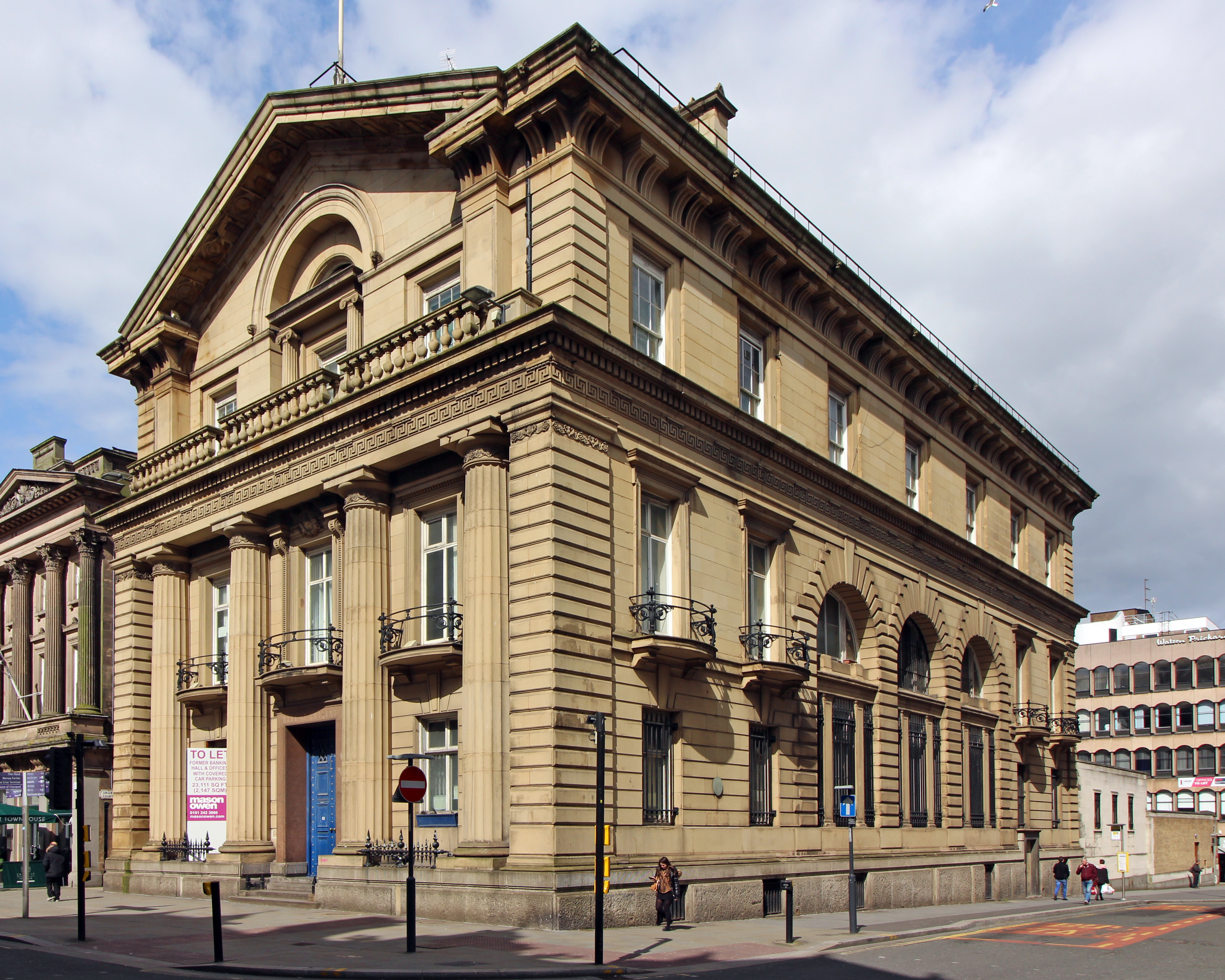
- Interactive map of the Bank of England Building area

General information
- Architectural style: Neoclassical
- Location: 31 Castle Street, Liverpool, England
- Construction started: 1845
- Completed: 1848
- Client: Bank of England

Design and construction
- Architect: Charles Robert Cockerell

Listed Building – Grade I
- Designated: 28 June 1952
- Reference no.: 1205904

The Bank of England Building is a Grade I listed building located on Castle Street, Liverpool, England.

== History ==
The Bank of England first decided to open premises on Castle Street, Liverpool in 1826, which helped establish the area as the city's financial centre.

The present building was designed by Charles Robert Cockerell and built in a Neoclassical style between 1845 and 1848. The building was one of three provincial branches he designed for the Bank of England in the mid-19th century.

The building was used entirely by the bank and did not contain any lettable space to other businesses, which were fast being established in the district. Subsequently, Cockerell built a similar building in Cook Street for this purpose. It was demolished in 1959.

The building was used by the Bank of England until 1987. In the 1990s, TSB used the building for a few years before it lay empty. In 2015, homeless activists occupied the building for two weeks before being evicted by police. During the occupation, the activists caused an estimated £46,000 worth of damage to the building.

The Ivy restaurant group opened a brasserie in the building in November 2024.

== Architecture ==
The building combines several neoclassical architectural styles, including Greek, Roman and Renaissance. The most evident of these is Greek, with four Doric style columns 'tying' the ground and first floors together. The building itself is raised up from ground level, sitting atop a rough granite plinth.

The front of the building contained accommodation for the bank's agent, accessible from Union Court. The sub-agent had a similar layout at the rear.

Despite only being three bays wide and seven bays deep, the building's design was seen to give it an "overwhelmingly massive and powerful" appearance. The building is regarded as one of Cockerell's most impressive; it was described by Nikolaus Pevsner as a "masterpiece of Victorian architecture", and by the National Heritage List for England as "one of Cockerell's richest and most inventive buildings." It was Grade I listed on 28 June 1952.

== See also ==
- Bank of England
- Architecture of Liverpool
