= Exchange Buildings (1864–1867; demolished 1939) =

Building in Liverpool, England

Coordinates: 53.40759°N 2.99205°W

Exchange Buildings (1864–67; demolished 1939)

General information
- Type: Commercial offices, museum & restaurants & bars
- Architectural style: French Renaissance style
- Location: Liverpool, England, United Kingdom
- Completed: 1867

Design and construction
- Architect: Thomas Henry Wyatt

Exchange Buildings (1864–1867; demolished 1939) was a Victorian building designed by Thomas Henry Wyatt in French Renaissance style. It had been built (1864–1867) on Exchange Flags in Liverpool, England. It was demolished and replaced by the current building (Exchange Flags) in 1939.

== History ==
The Illustrated London News, 18 January 1868, page 68: The illustration here shows a civic ball held in the News Room to honour the visiting Prince Arthur, and Princess and Prince Christian of Schleswig-Holstein.

The courtyard faced Liverpool Town Hall and contained the Nelson Monument.

The building was on the same site of another previous exchange (Exchange Buildings (1803–1808; demolished 1864)) in Liverpool. It was the centre of the cotton trade, cotton traders were based in the surrounding streets, surviving offices used by cotton traders include the Albany Building in Old Hall Street, Berey's Buildings, Bixteth Street and Mason's Building in Exchange Street East, in 1896 cotton trading moved indoors to Brown's Buildings were the former Martin Bank Headquarters is now. The tympanum in the pediment above the south portico once contained sculptures carved and sculpted by William Nicholl and designed by Cockerell. The News Room of the new Exchange Building as built in 1864, was far grander than the old one of the former Exchange Buildings, constructed in 1808. The illustration shows a civic ball held in the News Room to honour the visiting Prince Arthur, and Princess and Prince Christian of Schleswig-Holstein. This print was published in The Illustrated London News in 1868 (18 January 1868, page 68).

The old and the new Exchange building
