= High Street, Liverpool =

Road in Liverpool, England

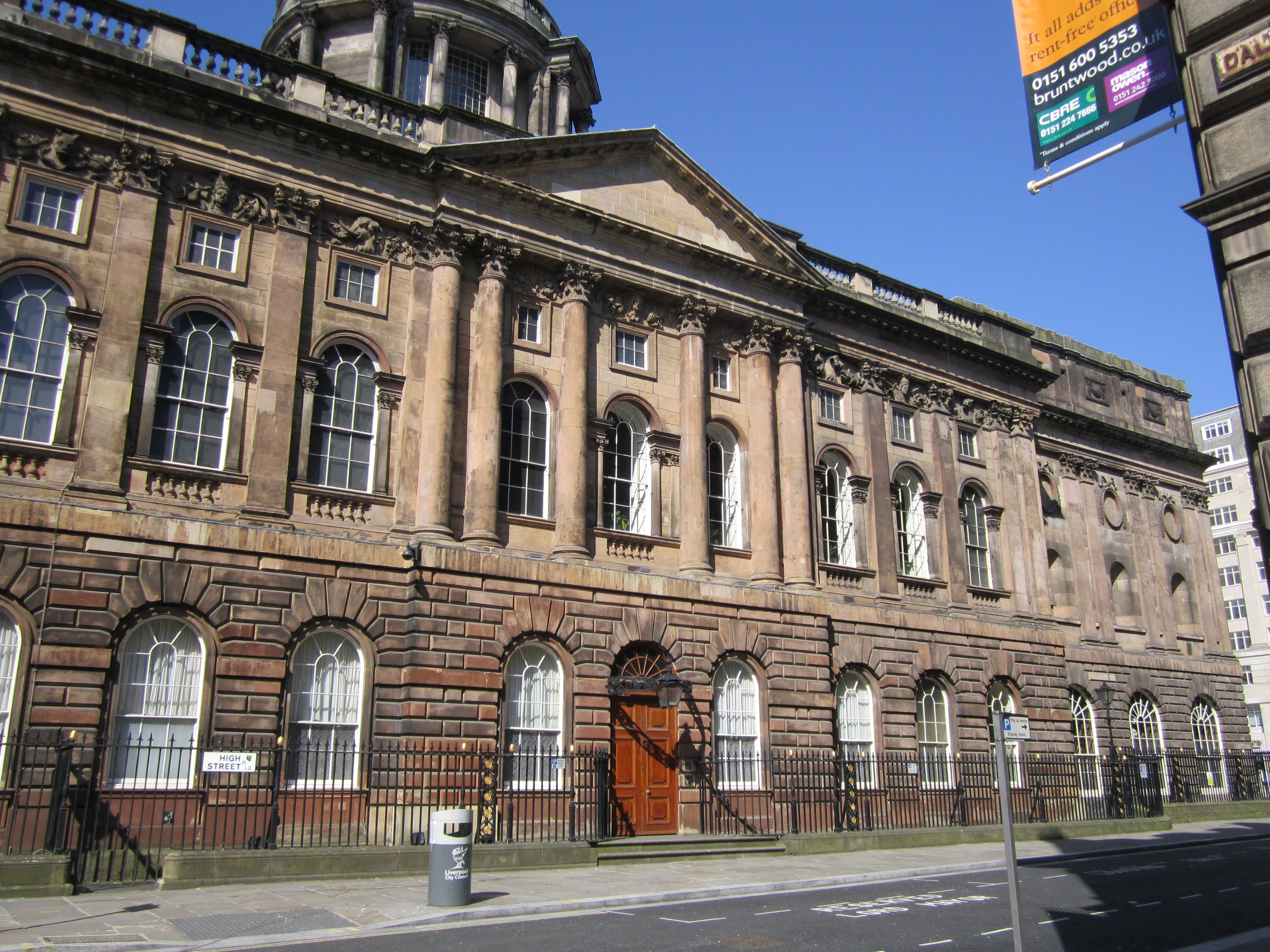
- Liverpool Town Hall on High Street, with Exchange Flags in the background

- Location within Liverpool
- Location: Liverpool city centre
- Postal code: L2
- Coordinates: 53.4073°N 2.9914°W

Other
- Known for: Offices

High Street is a road in Liverpool, England. Situated in the city centre, it runs between Exchange Flags and Dale Street and is part of Liverpool's business district.

== History ==
The street was one of the original seven streets that made up the medieval borough founded by King John in 1207, together with Water Street, Castle Street, Chapel Street, Old Hall Street, Tithebarn Street and Dale Street. The original plan for the shape of Liverpool's streets was in the shape of a letter 'H', and High Street was the cross bar.

Liverpool's first town hall was recorded in 1515 and was situated on High Street. This building was replaced in 1673 by a newer building which was in turn replaced by the current town hall in 1754. The street was also home to Liverpool's first Custom House.

The street was originally called 'Juggler Street', as it is believed jugglers performed there. The street was given its current name in the 18th century. Before the construction of the Exchange Building, High Street connected to Mill Street, which is now known as Old Hall Street.

== Listed buildings ==
High Street contains two notable Grade II listed buildings: Liverpool Town Hall and the Liverpool, London and Globe Building. Work building the current town hall started in 1749 and was completed in 1754. The Liverpool, London and Globe Building was built for the Liverpool and London Globe Insurance Company by architect C. R. Cockerell between 1856 and 1858.
