= St Paul's Square =

St Paul's Square may refer to:

- St Paul's Square, Birmingham, England
- St Paul's Square, Liverpool, England
