= State Insurance Building, Liverpool =

State Insurance Building
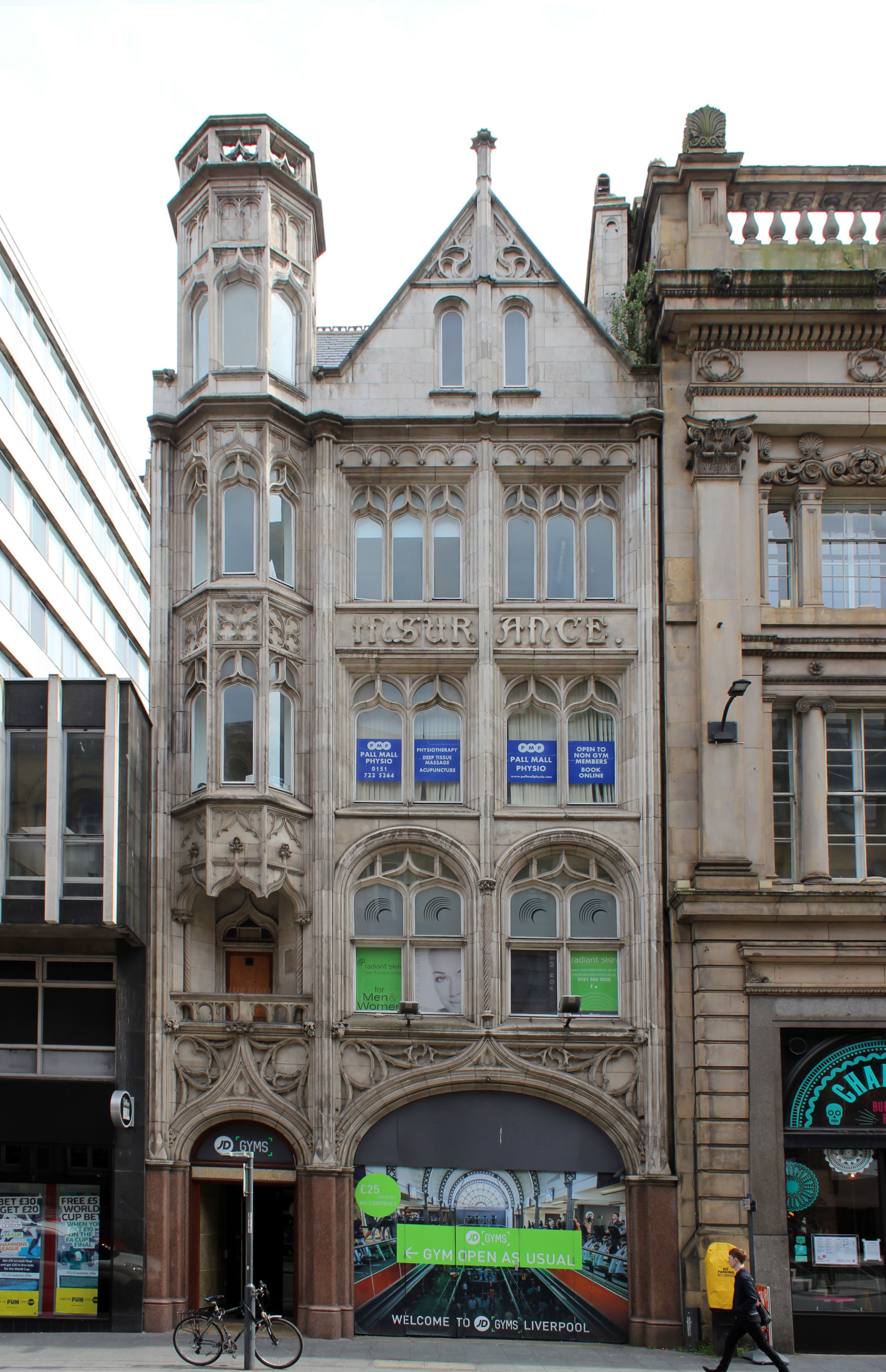
- State Insurance Building

- Location in Liverpool
- 53.40726°N 2.99013°W
- Location: 14 Dale Street, Liverpool, Merseyside, England
- OS grid reference: SJ 343 905

History
- Built: 1906

Site notes
- Architect: Walter Aubrey Thomas
- Architectural style: Gothic Revival

Listed Building – Grade II
- Designated: 14 March 1975
- Reference no.: 1068277

The State Insurance Building is at 14 Dale Street, Liverpool, Merseyside, England. Half of the building was destroyed by bombing in the Second World War. Both its external architecture and its internal decoration are elaborate.

== History ==
The building was constructed in 1906 to a design by Walter Aubrey Thomas, who also designed the Royal Liver Building and Tower Buildings. It was originally symmetrical about a central turret, but the half of the building, the part extending towards North John Street, was destroyed by bombing in the Second World War. The building continues to be used as offices, with a restaurant on the ground floor.

In the 1920s the downstairs of the building was used as a popular dance hall and venue. After the second World War it was closed and later reopened as a Debenhams department store. In the 1980s it transformed again into a popular night club and rave hot spot, using the open plan hall downstairs to set up a stage for live music, but later closed down again. It is now utilised only four times a year as a special event night club and rave venue which still holds the original marbled walls and gold painted ceiling.

== Architecture ==
=== Exterior ===
Constructed in ashlar with columns of polished red granite on the ground floor, the building has three bays. Its architectural style is described as "flamboyant Gothic", and as "wiry, sinuous Gothic". The left hand bay has five storeys. Its ground floor contains a narrow doorway with an ogee arch and tracery in the spandrels. A stair turret rises above the doorway. The first floor contains a balustraded balcony over which is a triple-arched canopy. Above this are three storeys with ogee-headed windows containing tracery. The top storey is octagonal and is surmounted by a pierced parapet. The other two bays have three storeys. The ground floor contains an ogee-headed doorway, wider than that in the left hand bay. The first and second floors have two two-light windows, and the third floor has two three-light windows. Between the second and third floors is a panel inscribed with the word "Insurance". Above the top storey is a gabled attic containing two narrow round-headed windows with tracery above them. Between the bays are fluted colonnettes.

=== Interior ===
Inside the building is a central courtyard with a glazed barrel vault. Around this are galleries with wooden balustrades. The ground floor rooms have ceilings decorated with plasterwork and supported by metal columns. Between the columns is blind arcading decorated with multi-coloured marble. The arcades contain panels with circular plaster reliefs by Alfred R. Martin. The reliefs depict themes from traditional stories. In the former entrance hall are more reliefs, these depicting castles. The building is recorded in the National Heritage List for England as a designated Grade II listed building.

== In popular culture ==
Two big 80's things were filmed in The State when it was a club: The video for Frankie Goes To Hollywood's Relax plus the club scenes when the girls meet the boys in Letter to Brezhnev - the 1985 film starring Alexandra Pigg and Margie Clarke.

== See also ==
- Grade II listed buildings in Liverpool-L2
- Architecture of Liverpool
