= Liverpool Echo =

English daily tabloid newspaper

Coordinates: 53°24′33.6″N 2°59′40.4″W

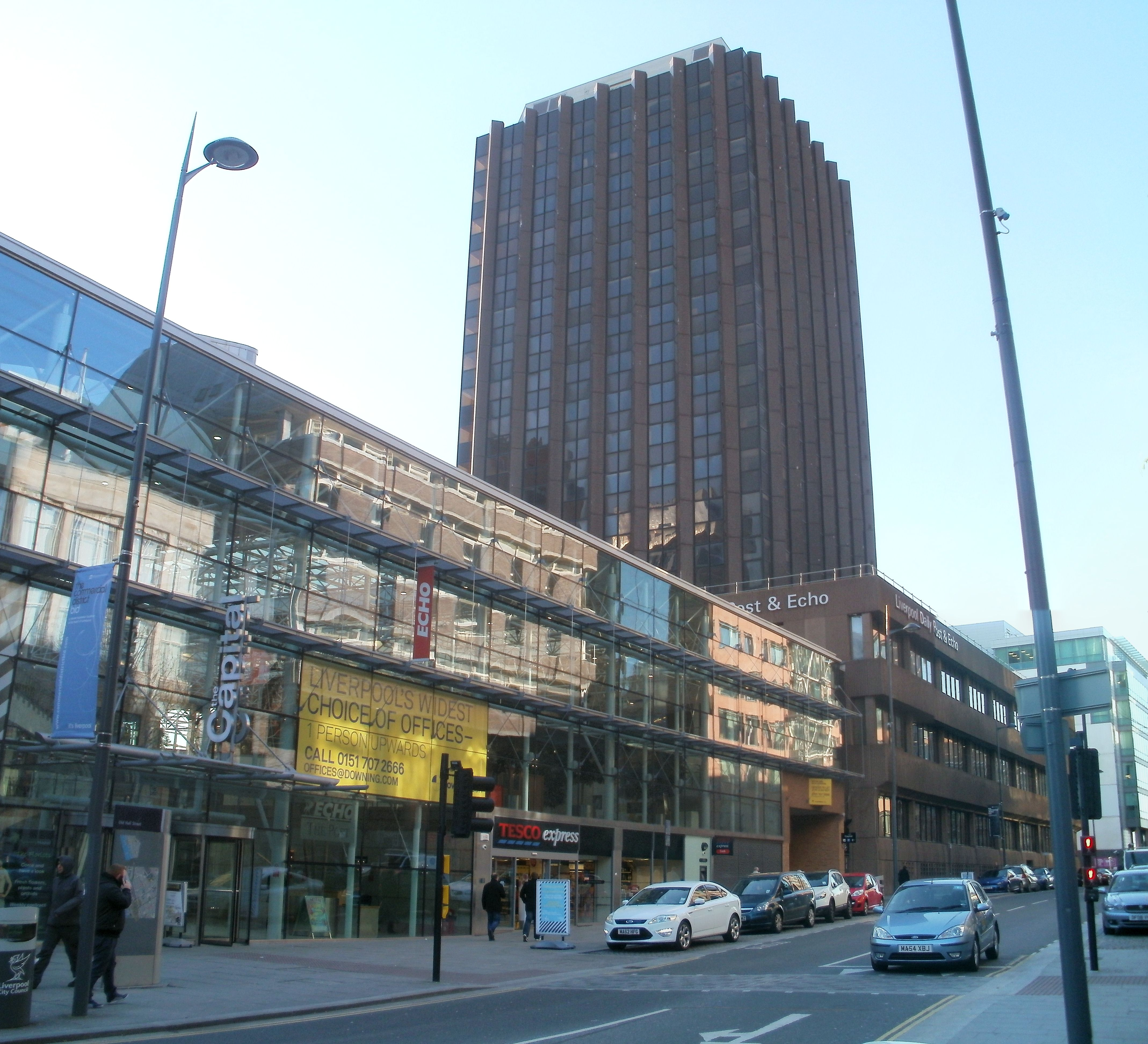
- Liverpool Echo building in March 2013; Credit: John Bradley
- Type: Daily newspaper
- Format: Tabloid
- Owner: Reach plc
- Editor: Steve Graves
- Founded: 1879
- Political alignment: Centre-left
- Headquarters: Liverpool, Merseyside
- Circulation: 7,645 (as of 2026)
- Website: www.liverpoolecho.co.uk

The Liverpool Echo is a local newspaper published by Reach plc and based in Liverpool, England. It is published Monday through Sunday, and is Liverpool's daily newspaper. Until 13 January 2012, it had a sister morning paper, the Liverpool Daily Post. Between July and December 2025, it had an average daily circulation of 7,645.

Historically, the newspaper was published by the Liverpool Daily Post & Echo Ltd. Its office is in St Paul's Square, Liverpool, having downsized from Old Hall Street in March 2018.

== History ==
In 1879, the Liverpool Echo was published as a cheaper sister paper to the Liverpool Daily Post. From its inception until 1917 the newspaper cost a halfpenny. It is now £2.40 Monday to Friday, £2.80 on Saturday and £3.10 on Sunday.

In 1973, the paper moved from Victoria Street to a building in Old Hall Street.

The limited company expanded internationally and underwent restructuring in 1985, becoming Trinity International Holdings Plc. Prior to this restructuring, the two original newspapers had recently been re-launched in tabloid format.

A special Sunday edition of the Echo was published on 16 April 1989, for reporting on the previous day's Hillsborough disaster, in which 97 Liverpool F.C. fans were fatally injured at the FA Cup semi-final tie in Sheffield. All of the 75,000 copies printed were sold.

In 1999 Trinity merged with Mirror Group Newspapers to become Trinity Mirror, the largest stable of newspapers in the country. In 2018, Trinity Mirror was rebranded as Reach plc.

On 7 January 2014 it was announced that a regular Sunday edition of the paper would be launched. The Sunday Echo is "a seventh day of publication, not an independent product", according to the paper.

In 2008 the paper moved printing from Liverpool to Trinity Mirror Plc, Oldham, Greater Manchester, while journalists remain based at St Paul's Square in Liverpool city centre, where they had relocated to in 2018.

In 2020, editor-in-chief Alistair Machray stood down and was replaced by Maria Breslin.

Criticism has been directed at the Echo for its perceived bias towards local politicians. In 2024, Liam Thorp, the paper's political editor, collaborated on a book titled "Head North: A Rallying Cry for a More Equal Britain" with the metro mayors of Manchester and Liverpool, Andy Burnham and Steve Rotheram.
