= Walter Aubrey Thomas =

English architect

Walter Aubrey Thomas (1864, Birkenhead, Cheshire – 13 September 1934, Wirral, Cheshire) (also known as Aubrey Thomas) was an English architect who practised from an office in Dale Street, Liverpool. For his training he was articled to the Liverpool architect Francis Doyle, and established his independent practice in about 1876. His works consisted mainly of commercial buildings. He has been described as "the most individual Liverpool architect of the early 1900s". At least seven of his works are designated by English Heritage as listed buildings, and these are included in the list below, of which the most notable is the Grade I listed Royal Liver Building. Sharples and Pollard in the Pevsner Architectural Guides state that "his work shows admirable inventiveness and stylistic variety, as well as ambition matched by technological resourcefulness". In 1886, Walter Aubrey Thomas married Maud Paris. Her family were said to be of Greek extraction. Together, they had seven children: Walter Glegge, who died in 1907 at the age of 21. Louise (Lulu), followed by Dorrit, Winifred (Winsome), Edward (Bill), Oliver and Humphrey. Despite all of his commitments, W A Thomas appears to have been a good father. The boys were educated by home tutors and the girls were sent to Cheltenham Ladies College. The family home, designed by their father, was called Bleak House – now Brooke House – at Parkgate, Cheshire. Later, another house was built for them at Dunstan Wood. He died on the 13th September 1934. Great-grandchildren include Sophie Thomas, Edward Thomas & Oliver Aubrey-Thomas

== Key ==
| Grade | Criteria |
|---|---|
| Grade I | Buildings of exceptional interest, sometimes considered to be internationally important. |
| Grade II* | Particularly important buildings of more than special interest. |
| Grade II | Buildings of national importance and special interest. |

== Works ==
| Name | Location | Photograph | Date | Notes | Grade |
|---|---|---|---|---|---|
| New Zealand House | 18 Water Street, Liverpool; 53.4065°N 2.9932°W | | c. 1893 | A new commercial building. | — |
| Lord Street Arcade | 81–89 Lord Street, Liverpool; 53.4055°N 2.9865°W | | 1901 | The frontage is in red and white stone in Italian Gothic style. It is in three bays, each bay including a round arch, above which is a row of windows resembling a triforium, and a gable. It originally led to a glass-roofed shopping arcade. | II |
| Brooke House | Parkgate, Cheshire; 53.2994°N 3.0866°W | — | 1904 | A house Aubrey Thomas built for himself in "understated" Arts and Crafts style. | II |
| State Insurance Building | 14 Dale Street, Liverpool; 53.4073°N 2.9901°W | | 1906 | The building was initially symmetrical about a central tower, but it was damaged in the Second World War. The remaining part of the building has three bays, and incorporates a five-storey turret. Its architectural style is described as "flamboyant Gothic", and as "wiry, sinuous Gothic". | II |
| Tower Building | Corner of Water Street and the Strand, Liverpool; 53.4064°N 2.9944°W | | 1906 | This is an office building on the site of the former Tower of Liverpool, with crenellated turrets providing a link to this. It is one of the earliest steel-framed buildings in the country, and is clad in white glazed terracotta. | II* |
| Royal Liver Building | Pier Head, Liverpool; 53.4058°N 2.9958°W | | 1908–11 | This was one of the first multi-storey, reinforced concrete, steel-framed buildings in the world. It was built for the Royal Liver Assurance. Its exterior is cladded with granite. The building is in eight storeys, it incorporates domes at its corners, and has two clock towers, each of which is surmounted by a copper sculpture representing a liver bird. It is described as "perhaps the most extraordinary office block of its date in the country". | I |
| Crane Building | Hanover Street, Liverpool; 53.4044°N 2.9823°W | | 1913–15 | This was built as a five-storey store selling musical instruments, with a theatre above it, later known as the Epstein Theatre and the Neptune Theatre. The theatre has been refurbished, and renamed the Epstein Theatre. | II |
| Dunstan Wood | Burton, Cheshire; 53.2680°N 3.0169°W | — | 1926 | A house built by Aubrey Thomas for himself. It is entirely in concrete, including the staircase and the roof. | — |
| Elmhurst | Neston, Cheshire; 53.2903°N 3.0684°W | | Undated | Alterations and an extension to a building dating from 1717. | II |
