= Chapel Street, Liverpool =

Road in Liverpool, England

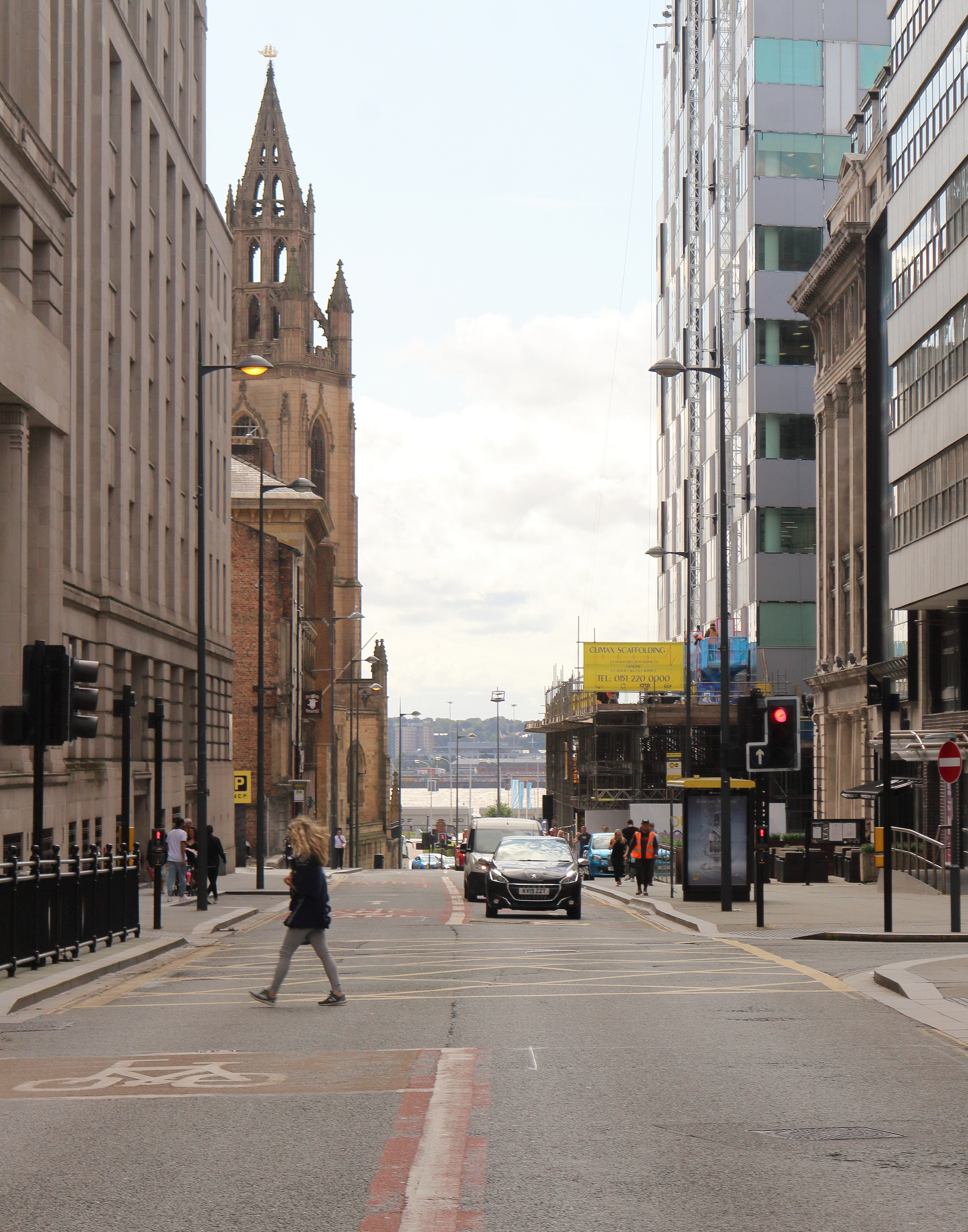
- Chapel Street, Liverpool

- Location within Liverpool
- Location: Liverpool city centre
- Postal code: L2
- Coordinates: 53.4076°N 2.9961°W

Other
- Known for: Offices, hotels, bars

Chapel Street is a road in Liverpool, England. Situated in the city centre, it runs between Tithebarn Street and the Dock Road.

== History ==
The street was one of the original seven streets that made up the medieval borough founded by King John in 1207, together with Water Street, Old Hall Street, Castle Street, High Street, Tithebarn Street and Dale Street. The street originally contained a chapel by the quayside, known as St. Mary atte Key. The first recorded reference to Chapel Street dates from 1368 on a deed for a burgage plot.

By 1355, the church was deemed too small for Liverpool's growing population, and a new church was to be built on land given by the Duke of Lancaster to the burgesses. Known as Church of Our Lady and Saint Nicholas, it took over a century to build.

During the 1700s the road was home to two of Liverpool's mayors, Laurence Spence and William Hesketh, who both had houses there. A 1907 reprint of a street directory from 1766 listed Chapel Street as being home to a boarding school, two street surgeons, lawyers, merchants and the Collector of Excise.

In the 1800s, Chapel Street was a narrow road, with a couple of big residential houses and was home to a pig market. By the 1820s, Liverpool Corporation had begun to widen the road on Chapel Street along with Water Street. The pig market, situated where Rumford Place is, was on the site of a cattle market which had existed since around 1571.

Over the course of time, parts of the church were demolished and rebuilt. In February 1810, part of the spire collapsed into the knave below, killing 25 people. The church was damaged during World War 2, and rebuilding of the church began 1949, with the new building being consecrated in October 1952.

Chapel Street was home to a boarding house and brothel in the 18th century. The building was shut and converted into the Pig and Whistle pub in 1875. The pub takes its name from the crew bars on ships.

== Listed buildings ==
Chapel Street contains several Grade II listed and buildings, these include:

- Church of Our Lady and Saint Nicholas
- Exchange Flags
- Hargreaves Building
- Mersey Chambers
