= Tithebarn Street =

Road in Liverpool, England

Tithebarn Street, Liverpool
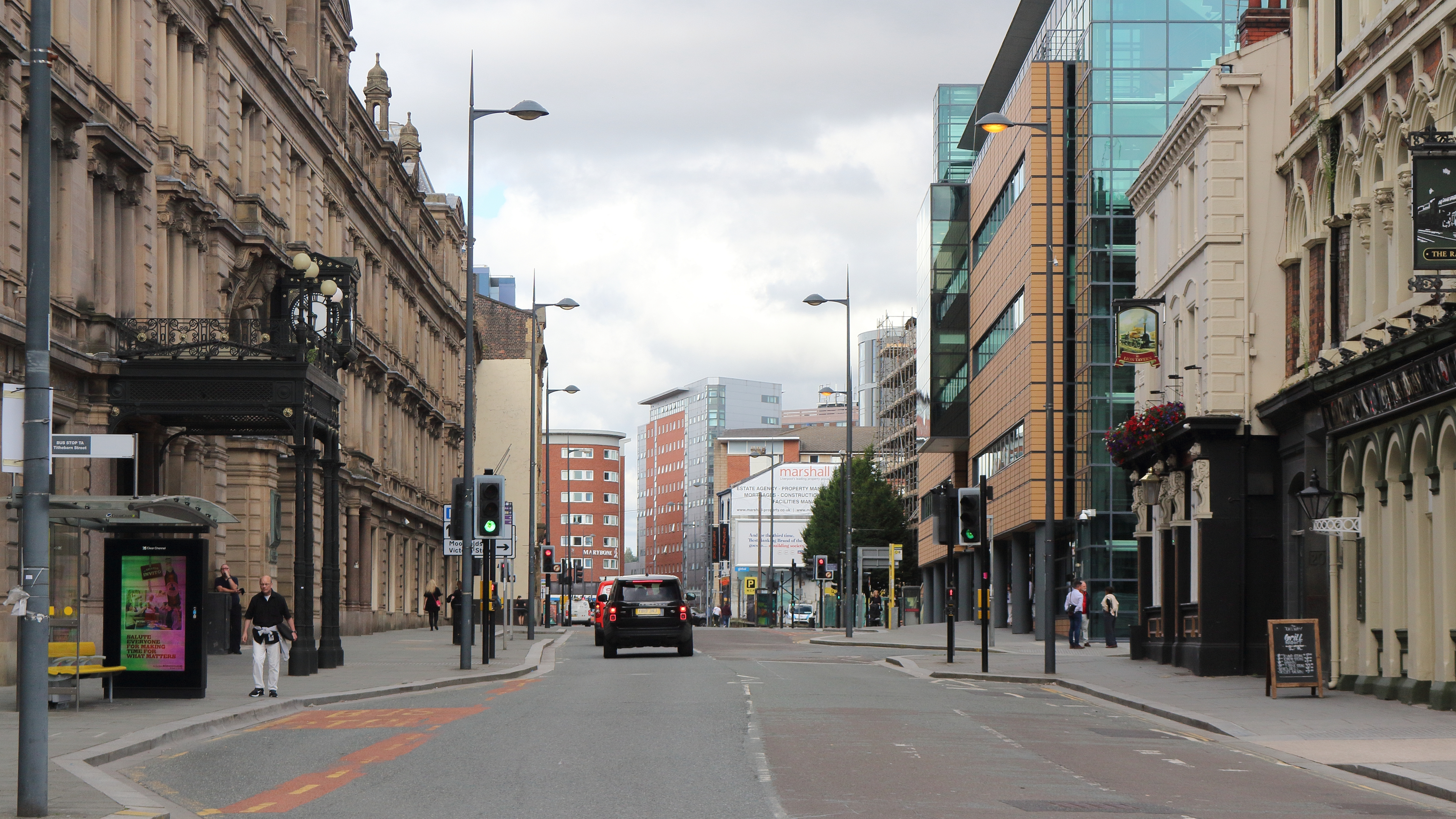
- Tithebarn Street in 2019, the old Exchange Station can be seen on the left

- Location within Liverpool
- Location: Liverpool city centre
- Postal code: L2
- Coordinates: 53.4092°N 2.9904°W

Other
- Known for: Offices, shops, pubs

Tithebarn Street is a road in Liverpool, England. Situated in the city centre, it runs between Chapel Street and the junction of Great Crosshall Street and Vauxhall Road and is part of Liverpool's Knowledge Quarter.

== History ==
The street was one of the original seven streets that made up the medieval borough founded by King John in 1207, together with Water Street, Castle Street, Chapel Street, Old Hall Street, High Street and Dale Street. Originally, the street was known as Moor (or Moore) Street before its name was changed to the present day name. Records show a barn being built in 1523 by Sir William Molyneux on the corner of the street where it meets Cheapside. The barn was used to store tithes, but eventually fell out of use, being converted into shops when it passed out of the hands of the Molyneux family. Parts of the barn survived into the early 1900s.

Up until the mid-1820s, the street had been quite narrow. An Act of Parliament was passed which allowed Liverpool Corporation to widen the street, along with Dale Street, Lord Street and James Street. The work was headed by architect John Foster.

May 1850 saw the opening of a railway station, which would come to be known as Liverpool Exchange. Jointly owned by the Lancashire and Yorkshire Railway and the East Lancashire Railway, the station had ten platforms at its peak. However, the Beeching cuts proved to be the death knell of the station and, with mainline services moved to Liverpool Lime Street, it closed in April 1977. Local services were moved to the nearby Moorfields railway station with the creation of Merseyrail. The frontage of the station was preserved and turned into office space, known as Mercury Court.

The street was the scene of a brutal murder in 1874, known as the 'Tithebarn Street Outrage' when Robert Morgan, a dock worker, was kicked to death in front of his wife and brother. Morgan was killed by members of Liverpool's notorious Cornermen gang when he refused to hand over ale money to 17-year-old gang member, John McCrave.

During World War 2, Tithebarn Street and the area around it suffered extensive damage from the Blitz and required considerable rebuilding. The rail route to Exchange railway station was damaged by the bombing and parts of the roof of the station had to be demolished.

In 1970, the Churchill Way Flyovers were opened, linking Tithebarn Street and Dale Street to Lime Street. Built as part of an inner-city ring road project that was never fully completed, the flyovers were demolished in 2019 having been deemed unsafe.

In April 2005, popular Liverpool sculpture Superlambanana was moved to the street.

== Knowledge Quarter ==
Tithebarn Street is home to several university buildings and along with the surrounding streets is a popular site for student accommodation. Liverpool John Moores University (LJMU), has facilities on the road dating back from when it was Liverpool Polytechnic. LJMU's library, Avril Robarts Library, is situated on the street.

== Bibliography ==
- Butt, R.V.J. (1995), The Directory of Railway Stations, Patrick Stephens, ISBN 1-85260-508-1
- Welbourn, Nigel (2003) [First published 1994]. Lost Lines: LMR. Ian Allan. ISBN 9780711022775. OCLC 863421456.
