= National Westminster Bank, Liverpool =

Listed building in Liverpool, England

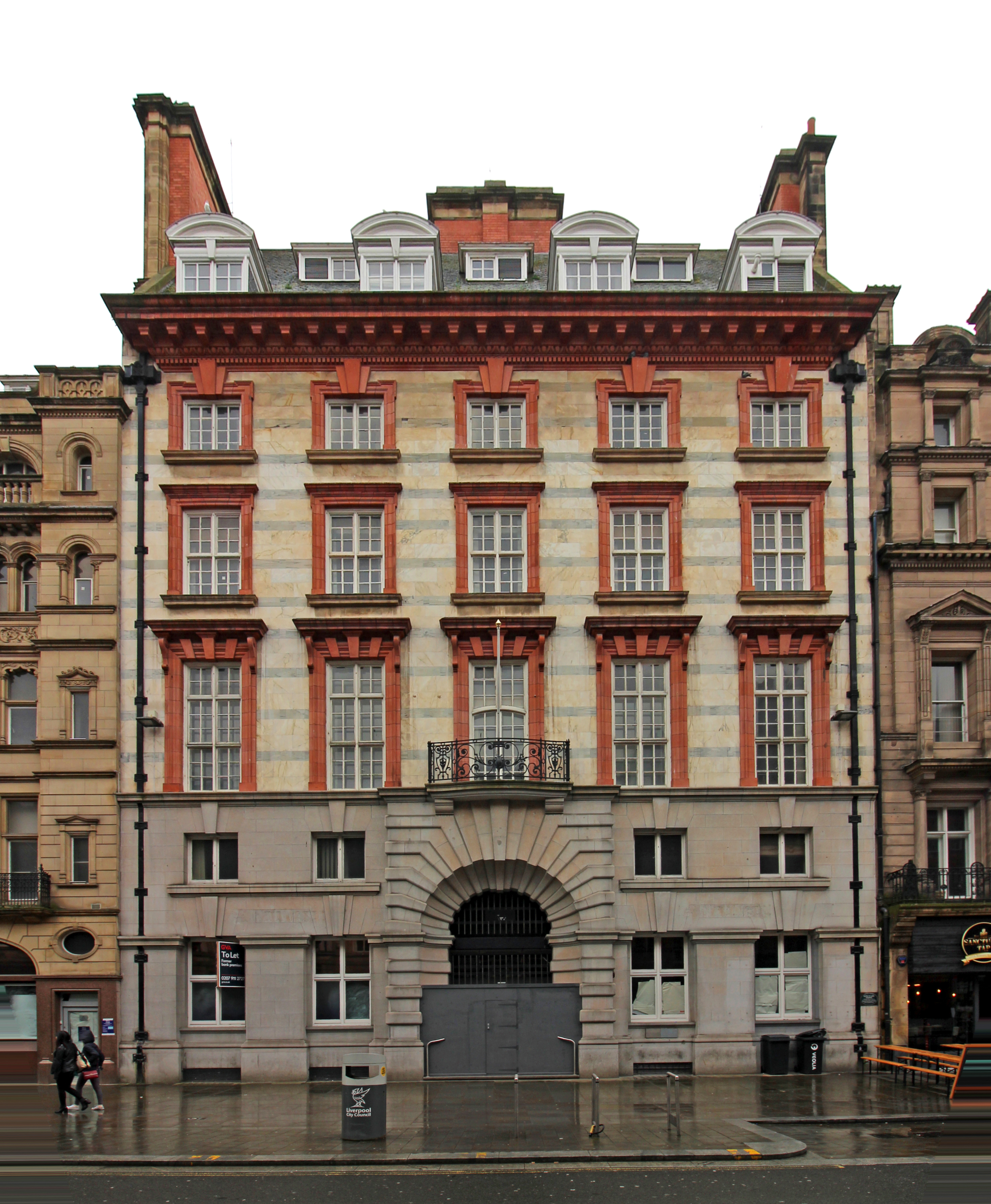
- The building in 2018

General information
- Architectural style: Renaissance
- Location: Castle Street, Liverpool, England
- Coordinates: 53°24′22″N 2°59′24″W
- Completed: 1901

Design and construction
- Architect(s): Richard Norman Shaw, William Edward Willink and Philip Coldwell Thicknesse
- Designations

Listed Building – Grade II*
- Official name: National Westminster Bank
- Designated: 28 June 1952
- Reference no.: 1205939

The National Westminster Bank on Castle Street in Liverpool, England is a Grade II* listed building.

It is a typical 19th-century bank building of early Renaissance style, with closely spaced classically styled windows and a heavily moulded cornice.

It was built between 1898 and 1901 for Parr's Bank, having been designed by Richard Norman Shaw. It later housed NatWest Bank, until they closed the bank in October 2017, putting it out for rent. Plans were announced in October 2021 to convert the venue into a 92-bed hotel and bar. Liverpool City Council approved planning permission for the ground floor to be turned into a bar and restaurant in July 2022, with further permission on turning the upper floors into a hotel with roof extension pending.

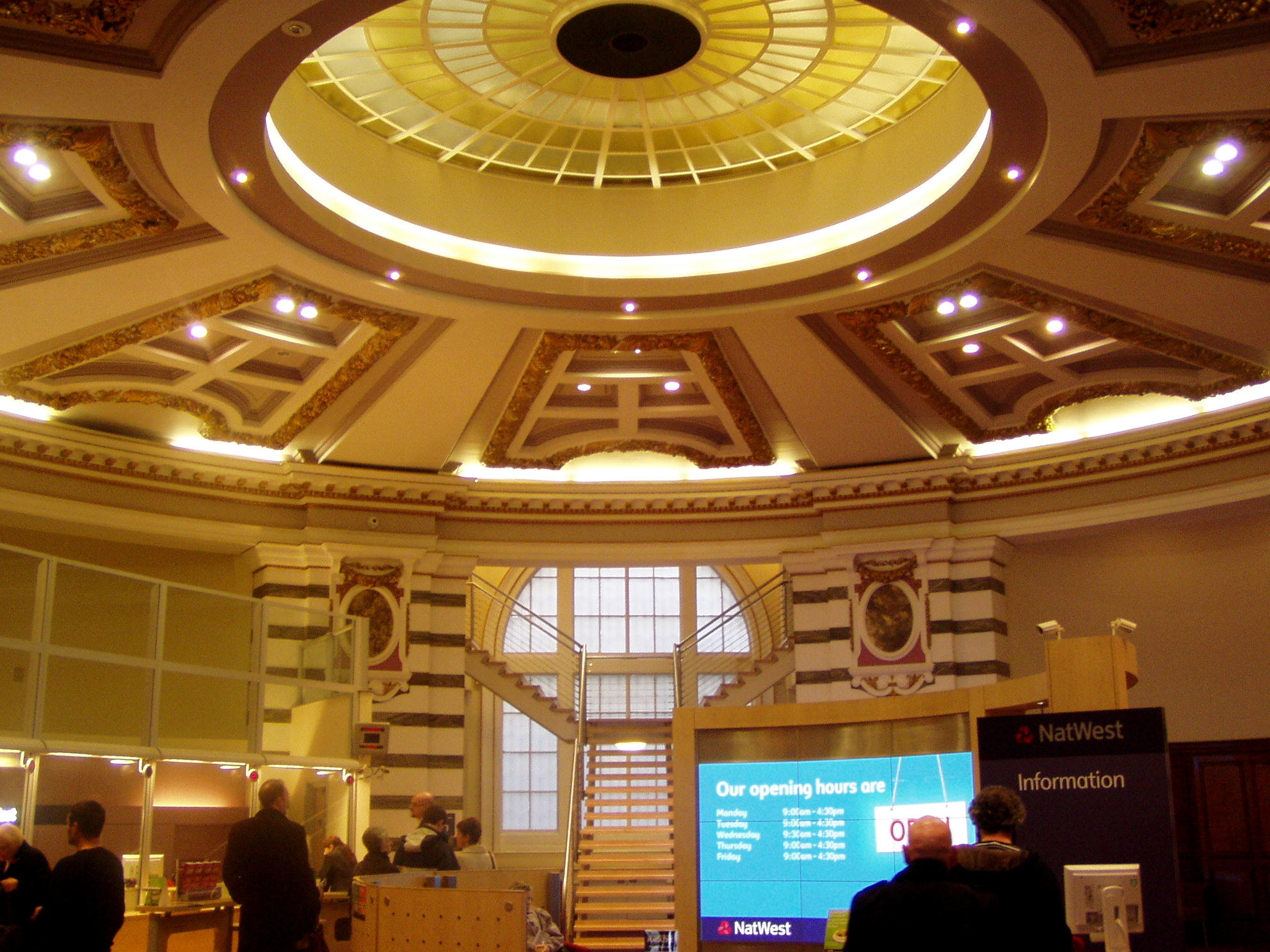
The circular banking hall, Castle Street, Liverpool

== See also ==
- Architecture of Liverpool
- Grade II* listed buildings in Liverpool – City Centre
