= Exchange Station =

Office building in Liverpool, England

Coordinates: 53.40990°N 2.98982°W

Exchange Station is a large office building on Tithebarn Street in the business district in Liverpool City Centre, Liverpool.

== History ==
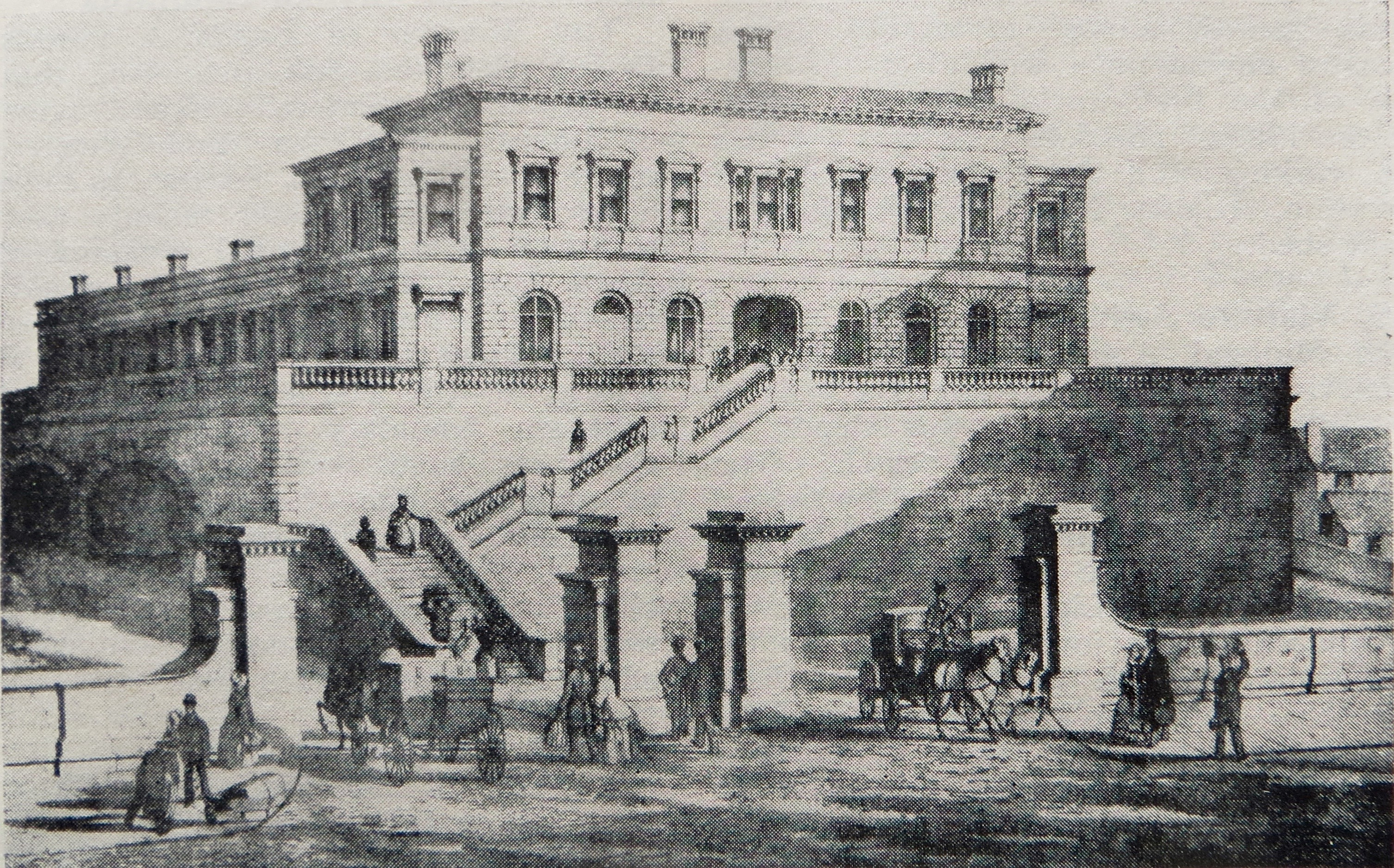
Tithebarn Street as it was between opening in 1850 and 1859

Exchange Station in 2019

The fascia of the building is formed from the frontage of the former Liverpool Exchange railway station, designed by architect Henry Shelmerdine. The railway station opened in 1850 and closed in 1977, with mainline services switching to Liverpool Lime Street and local services moving to Moorfields.

The new build office block of Mercury Court was built in 1985 by Kingham Knight, on the site of the old station's platforms. In 2013 it was subject to a £5 million redevelopment and renamed Exchange Station.

== Bibliography ==
- Butt, R.V.J. (1995), The Directory of Railway Stations, Patrick Stephens, ISBN 1-85260-508-1
- Welbourn, Nigel (2003) [First published 1994]. Lost Lines: LMR. Ian Allan. ISBN 9780711022775. OCLC 863421456.
