= Castle Street, Liverpool =

Road in Liverpool, England

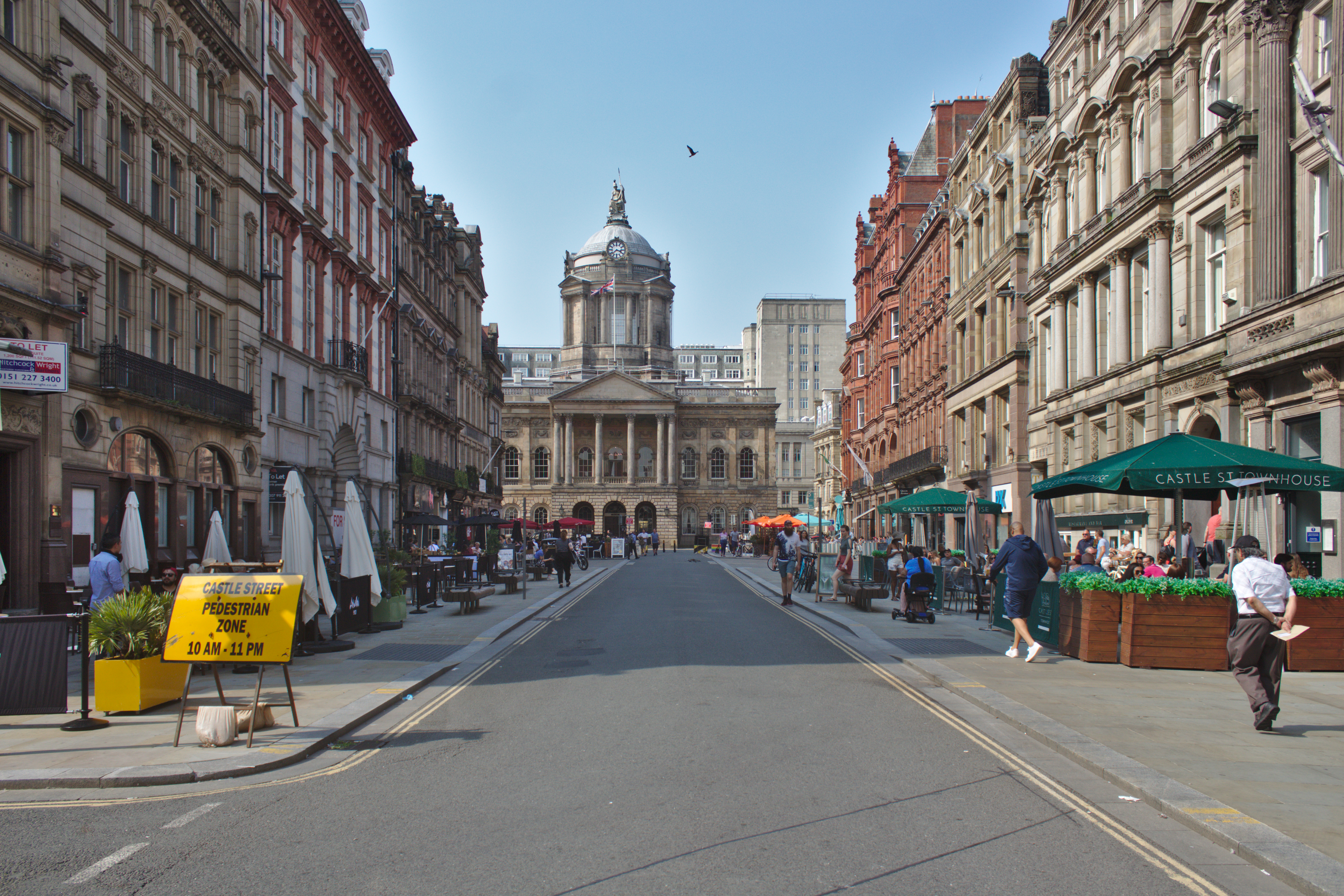
- Castle Street, Liverpool

- Location within Liverpool
- Location: Liverpool city centre
- Postal code: L2
- Coordinates: 53.4064°N 2.9911°W

Other
- Known for: Offices, restaurants, bars

Castle Street is a road in Liverpool, England. Situated in the city centre, it runs between Water Street and Derby Square, where Liverpool Castle once stood.

== History ==
The street was one of the original seven streets that made up the medieval borough founded by King John in 1207, together with Water Street, Old Hall Street, Chapel Street, High Street, Tithebarn Street and Dale Street.

Of the original seven streets, Castle Street was one of the most important due to it running from the river to the castle and the market. Its course was marked out at the creation of the Borough by a representative of King John. The boundary of the market was marked out by three Sanctuary Stones, one of which still remains on Castle Street.

The original street was very narrow, with barely enough room for two carts to pass each other. During the 18th and 19th centuries the road was widened.

Whilst once home to several banks, Castle Street is now home to many restaurants and bars and considered part of Liverpool's Food Quarter.

== Notable people ==
- Joseph Parry (1756–1826), artist who painted two pictures of Castle Street as part of his early work in 1786.
- Richard Owens (1831 – 1891), Welsh architect who worked for a company on the street called 'Williams & Jones', which bought rural land for housing development. As an architect, he was responsible for building over 10,000 houses in Liverpool (noticeably the Welsh Streets) and 250 chapels in England and Wales.

== Listed buildings ==
Castle Street contains seventeen Grade II listed and buildings as well a Grade I listed building, these include:

- 62 Castle Street
- Bank of England Building
- National Westminster Bank Building
