= Parr's Bank =

English bank

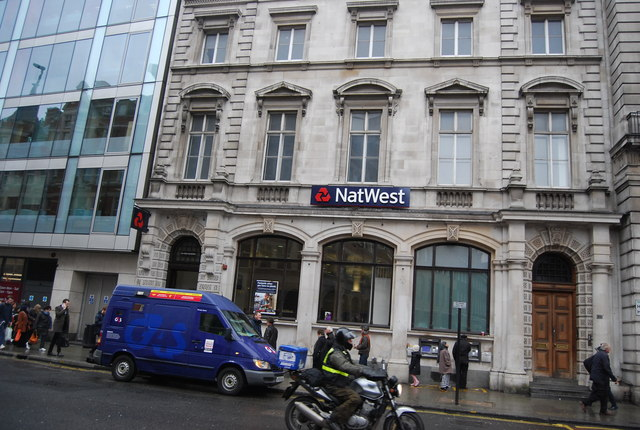
- Former head office of Parr's Bank, 214 High Holborn in London
- Founded: 1782
- Defunct: 1918
- Fate: Acquired by London County and Westminster Bank
- Headquarters: London

Parr's Bank Limited was a bank that existed from 1782 to 1918. It was founded as Parr & Co. in Warrington, then in the county of Lancashire in the United Kingdom. In 1918 it was acquired by London County and Westminster Bank, and it was thus one of the predecessors of NatWest Group.

== History ==
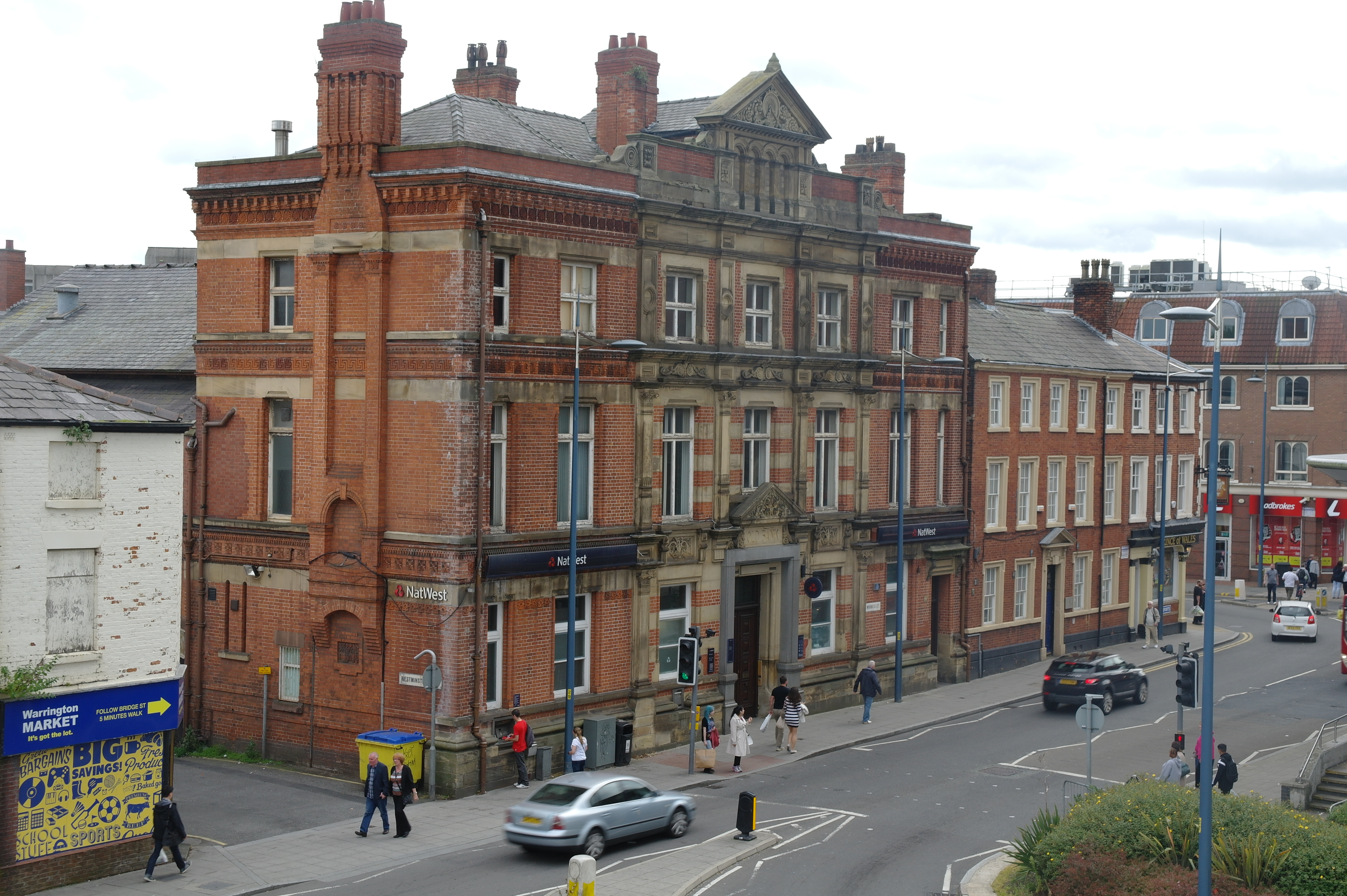
Former Warrington main branch of Parr's Bank

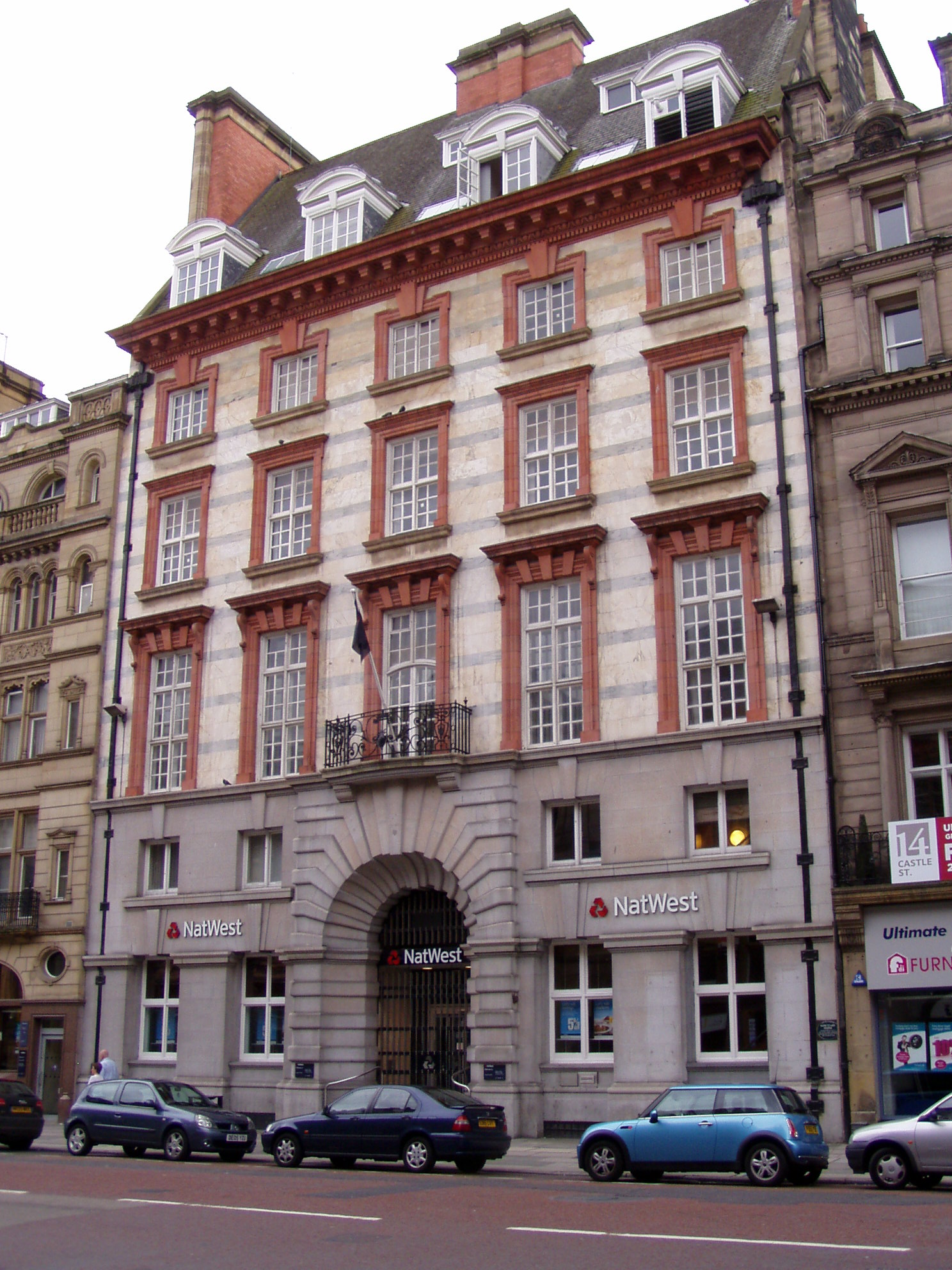
Liverpool City Office, formerly Parr's Bank, designed by Richard Norman Shaw in 1900

Writing in 1905, William Howarth described Parr's as "one of the great amalgamating banks in the country" and "a power in the financial world". The bank's history dates back to the late eighteenth century, with a possible starting date of 1782. The first partnership was with Joseph Parr, a sugar boiler, his brother-in-law Matthew Lyon, and Walter Kerfoot, a solicitor. Partnership names changed and the firm was variously known as Parr & Co, and Parr, Lyon; more colloquially it was known as The Warrington Bank.

Parr's remained essentially a local bank with offices in Warrington, Runcorn and St Helens until 1865 when it became a joint-stock bank under the name Parr's Banking Company. Helped by a series of acquisitions, including the National Bank of Liverpool, Parr's built up its presence in Cheshire, Lancashire and Staffordshire; by 1890 there were 22 branches and 21 sub-branches.

The bank's most important strategic move came in 1891 when it purchased the small London bank of Fuller, Banbury, Nix & Co. This gave Parr's a seat on the London Bankers' Clearing House and, in contrast to the nearby Bank of Liverpool it immediately moved the head office down to London. With Fuller giving the bank an initial London presence, the substance was provided by the acquisition of the Alliance Bank in 1892. The Alliance Bank had emerged from the financial reconstruction which had seen it lose its Liverpool and Manchester offices and now had 12 branches in London; in recognition of Alliance's importance the name of the bank was changed to Parr's Banking Company and the Alliance Bank. Other smaller London banks were acquired and in 1896 it bought the Consolidated Bank, only slightly smaller than the Alliance, but this time a London bank with branches in Manchester. At that point, the name was returned to Parr's Bank.

The 1890s also saw Parr's embark on acquisitions in the midlands and the south west, important ones being Pare's Leicestershire Banking in 1902 and Crompton and Evans’ Union Bank of Derby in 1914. However, its most prestigious acquisition was Stuckey's Bank (1909) (the "Somersetshire Bank") which "wielded great power in the west of England and had the largest note circulation of any bank in England outside the Bank of England".

=== Stuckey's Bank ===
Samuel Stuckey was a general merchant based in Langport, Somerset; by the 1770s, customers depositing funds with Stuckey had given rise to the embryo banking business. By 1782 Stuckey had London agents and by 1806 banking had grown sufficiently for Stuckey to constitute it separately as the Langport Bank. Branches were immediately opened in Bridgwater and Bristol, separately constituted to avoid the restriction on banks having no more than six partners. Following the 1826 Act, the bank was one of the first to become a joint stock bank, and the branches were formally incorporated into Stuckey's Banking Company. Over the next ten years, Stuckey's acquired seven local banks and opened an office in London. One notable member of the Bank was Walter Bagehot, later editor of The Economist who was appointed the secretary to the management committee in 1855. As well as opening new branches, Stuckey's continued to make acquisitions, the last being Dunsford of Tiverton in 1883. By the time of its acquisition in 1909 Stuckey's deposits were £7 million. compared with Parr's £31 million, making the enlarged bank the sixth largest joint stock bank in England.

=== Bought by Westminster Bank ===
By the outbreak of war in 1914 Parr's had almost 400 branches and sub-branches. In 1918 Parr's agreed to amalgamate with the London County and Westminster Bank. The Chairman of Parr's made the case: “We gain access to a very large area in the Home Counties. They gain a first-class introduction to Lancashire and to such leading towns in the Midlands as Leicester and Derby and a very valuable connection in the West of England.” The enlarged bank was renamed London County Westminster and Parr's Bank, until the name was shortened to Westminster Bank Limited in 1923.
