= Liverpool Stadium =

Indoor sporting arena located in United Kingdom

Coordinates: 53.410501°N 2.993909°W

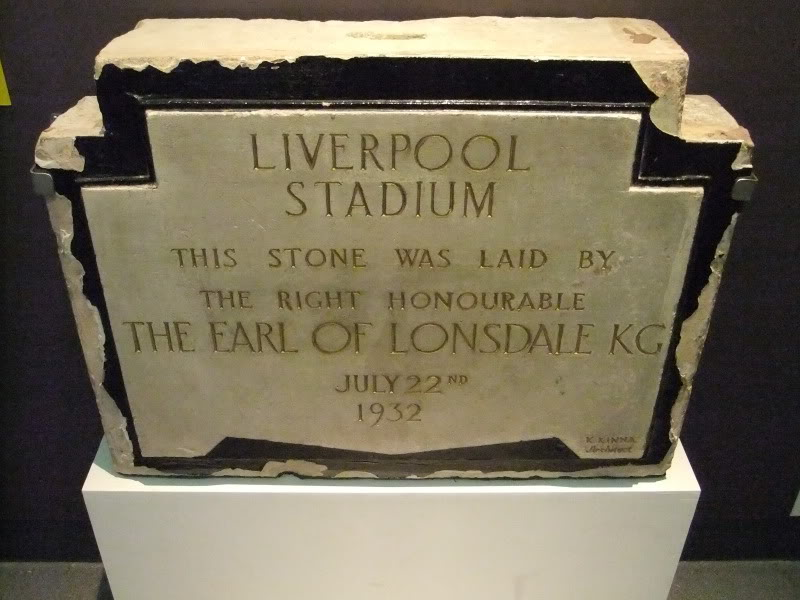
Foundation stone, displayed at Museum of Liverpool.

Liverpool Stadium was a 3,700 capacity boxing arena on St Paul's Square, Bixteth Street, Liverpool, England.

== History ==
The stadium was the UK's first purpose built boxing arena. Construction of the stadium was backed by a consortium known as 'Harmony Six', whose members included an official from the Amateur Boxing Association and Johnny Best, grandfather of the former Beatles drummer, Peter Best. The foundation stone was laid by the Earl of Lonsdale on 22 July 1932, and it was opened to the public on 20 October 1932 by Liverpool's Lord Mayor. The facade was finished in faience tiling with Art Deco detail, as were the lobby, corridors and public areas inside. The arena itself was wood panelled. The architect was Kenmure Kinna.

Aside from boxing, it hosted wrestling matches, pop and rock music concerts. Artists such as The Beatles, Led Zeppelin, Lou Reed, David Bowie and Hawkwind played there. It was also used for political hustings and trade union meetings, and it even hosted the 1951 Conservative Party conference. It closed in 1985 and was demolished in 1987.

In August 2025, a commemorative stone was unveiled on the site of the former stadium by boxer John Conteh and the wife of Thomas Hetherington.

== Earlier building ==
The building replaced an earlier venue of the same name, originally a Liverpool United Tramways Omnibus Company horse stables, on Pudsey Street, off London Road, on the other side of the city centre, which opened in July 1911.

== Bibliography ==
- Curley, Mallory. Beatle Pete, Time Traveller, Randy Press (2005): details how Pete Best's grandfather, Johnny Best, Sr., founded and ran Liverpool Stadium and includes an overall history of the Stadium.
