= Liverpool Magistrates' Court =

Court building in Liverpool, England

Liverpool Magistrates' Courts
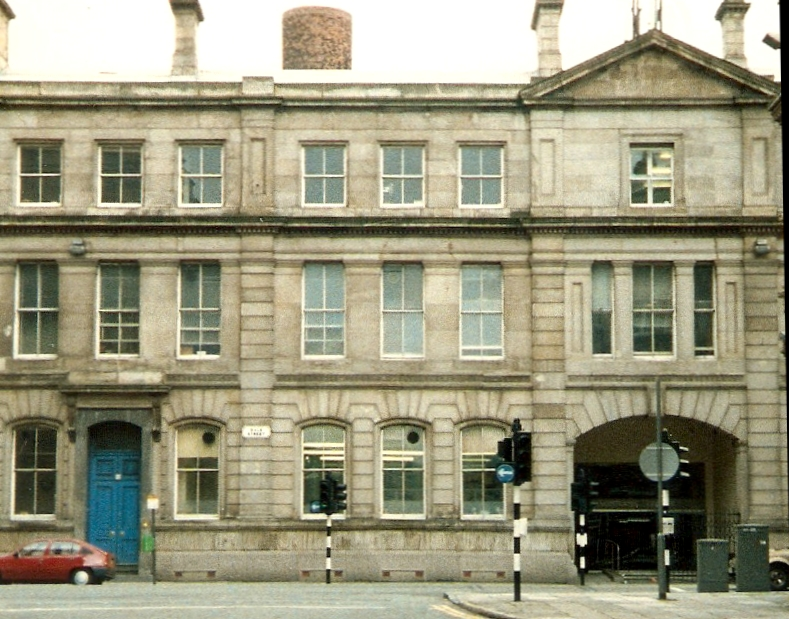
- Magistrates' Courts
- Interactive map of the Liverpool Magistrates' Courts area

General information
- Location: Liverpool, England
- Coordinates: 53.4092°N 2.9858°W
- Construction started: 1857; 169 years ago
- Completed: 1859; 167 years ago
- Client: His Majesty's Courts Service

The Magistrates' Courts is a building on Dale Street, Liverpool formerly used for magistrates' court hearings until 2015. It is a Grade II listed building designed by John Grey Weightman built between 1857 and 1859. Until the 1970s buildings in Great Crosshall Street were used for juvenile court hearings until a new purpose-built complex was opened accessible from Hatton Garden. There were also courtrooms in Victoria Street which were mostly used for hearing road traffic cases. They were operated by His Majesty's Courts Service.

In 2007 it was announced that the Dale Street building will close to be replaced by a new purpose-built set of courts. Approval for the project was given, with a budget of £35m, for a new complex to be built in the city centre, comprising 14 adult courtrooms, with a projected completion date of 2012.

The courts were instead relocated to the Queen Elizabeth II Law Courts in June 2015.
