= Exchange Buildings (1803–1808; demolished 1864) =

Building in Liverpool, England

Coordinates: 53.40759°N 2.99205°W

General information
- Type: Commercial offices, museum, restaurants and bars
- Architectural style: Classical style
- Location: Liverpool, England, United Kingdom
- Completed: 1808

Design and construction
- Architect: John Foster Sr. possibly a joint work with James Wyatt

Exchange Buildings (1803–1808; demolished 1864) was a large classical style office building by John Foster Sr. possibly a joint work with James Wyatt, demolished and replaced 1864–67 by a building of the same name (Exchange Buildings (1864–1867)) in French Renaissance style by Thomas Henry Wyatt.

The courtyard faced Liverpool Town Hall and contained the Nelson Monument. It was the centre of the cotton trade, cotton traders were based in the surrounding streets, surviving offices used by cotton traders include the Albany Building in Old Hall Street, Berey's Buildings, Bixteth Street and Mason's Building in Exchange Street East, in 1896 cotton trading moved indoors to Brown's Buildings were the former Martin Bank Headquarters is now.

== Description ==
=== Building ===
William Henry Pyne, "Lancashire illustrated from original drawings, 1769–1843" London 1832, H. Fisher, Son, and Jackson, p. 14

Lancashire illustrated : from original drawings, 1769–1843 described the building:

Of the buildings dedicated to commercial pursuits, this is the most important. This magnificent pile (in the opinion of many travellers, the most beautiful commercial structure in the world) was raised by a subscription of 800 share, at 100 each share; but it is ascertained that the entire expense was not less than 110,000. The first stone was laid on the 30th of June, 1803 and the building was completed in about six years. The area eclosed by the four fronts, is 194 feet by 180; and is, consequently, double that of the London exchange. This building is formed by four facades, or fronts, of which three adjoin each other and the fourth is formed by the north front of the Town hall. The architecture consists of a rusticated basement, with a piazza, extending round the whole, and opening to the area by a series of rustic arches, between strong piers. Above are two stories ornamented with Corinthian pillars and pilasters, and surrounded with an enriched bold cornice and parapet. In the centre of the nor[t]h side, resting on the basement, is a grand recessed portico, with eight handsome Corinthian columns. In the east wing is a coffee room, 94 feet by 52, the roof of which is supported on large ionic columns, and above this is another spacious room, appropriated to the underwriters. a public sale room and counting houses, occupy the other sides of this extensive range of buildings.

=== Interior of the Exchange News Room ===
Lancashire illustrated : from original drawings, 1769–1843 described the News Room

The exchange news room, and the rooms connected with it, occupy nearly all the lower story of the eastern wing of the exchange buildings. the interior of the news room, shown in the engraving, exhibits the magnificent dimensions of the apartment projected with architectural correctness. the extreme length, from north to south, is ninety four feet, three inches and the width from east to west, fifty one feet, nine inches, the greatest height, from the centre of the arched ceiling, is thirty one feet, four inches.
The architecture and decorations of the room are the Ionic order…The ceiling of this apartment is supported by sexteen columns, surmounted with volutes, and other distinguishing ornaments of the order. The shaft of each column consist of a single stone, without joint or fissure, a peculiarity, if not unparalleled, at least seldom observable in this species of architecture. these columns form a magnificent colonnade in the centre of the room, which has a most striking and commanding effect, when viewed from the north or south extremity. The height of the ceilings, on each side of the colonnade, is less by several feet than the coved one in the centre. They are flat, and divided into compartments, and their architraves rest on sixteen pilasters, arranged to correspond with the pillars.

=== Interior of the Exchange Underwriters Room ===
Lancashire illustrated : from original drawings, 1769–1843 described the Underwriters'-Room

The Underwriters'-room which is smaller than the news room occupies part of the second story of the exchange buildings and lies over the appendages of the latter room. it is seventy two feet in length, and thirty six feet wide, has a neat coved ceiling, and is furnished with a handsome chimney piece of black marble. six large windows overlook the area of the buildings over four of which is an oval aperture with an emblematical figure in stained glass. there are two other windows at the south end. the room is fitted up with boxes for the accommodation of persons transacting business and is well supplied with newspapers and other means of mercantile information. it is conducted on a principle similar to hat of Lloyds in London.

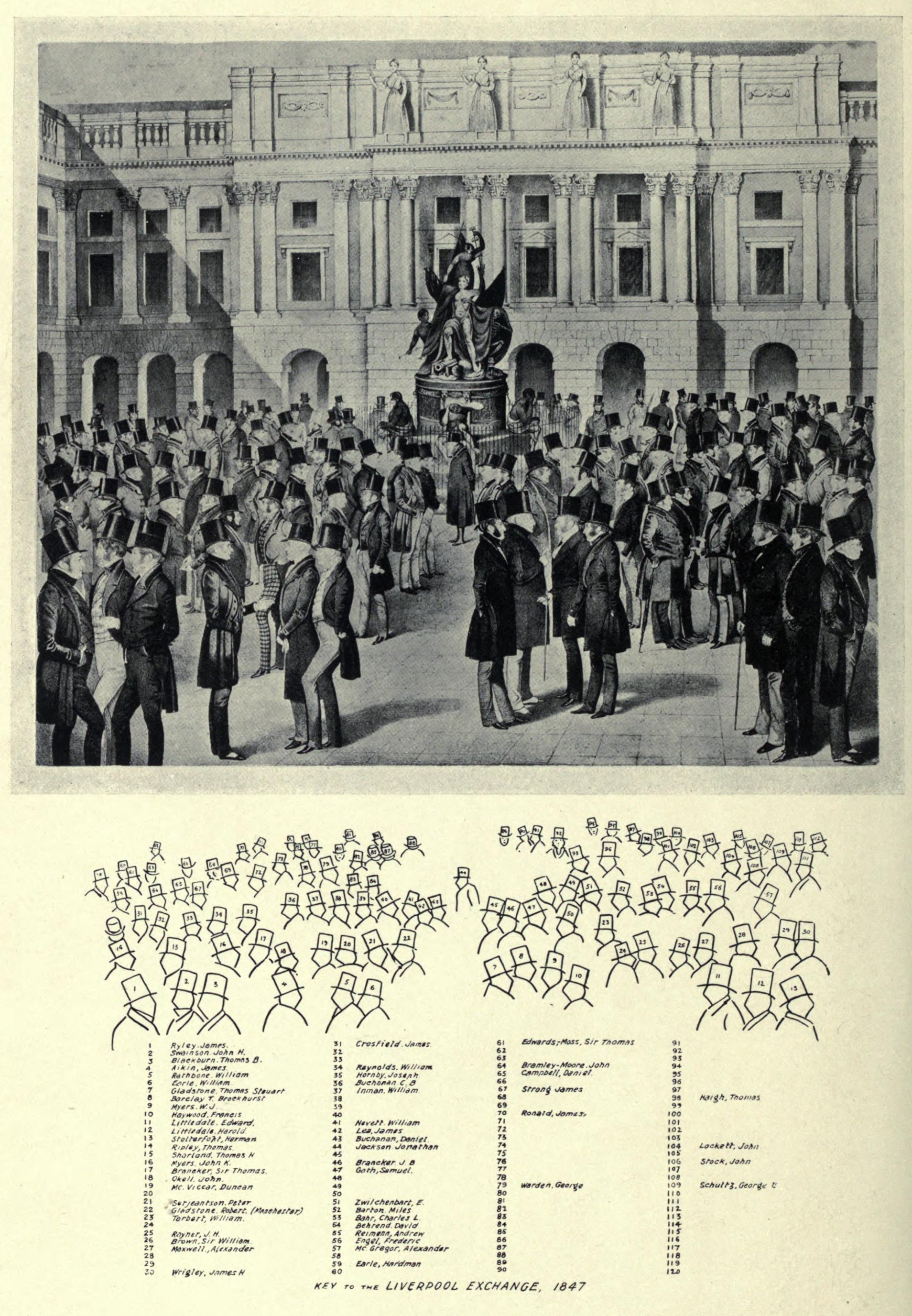

In 1723, Daniel Defoe visited Liverpool whilst travelling around Great Britain. In his book A tour through the whole island of Great Britain he describes the town hall and exchange built 1673.
