= Tower Building, Liverpool =

Listed building in Liverpool, England

Tower Building
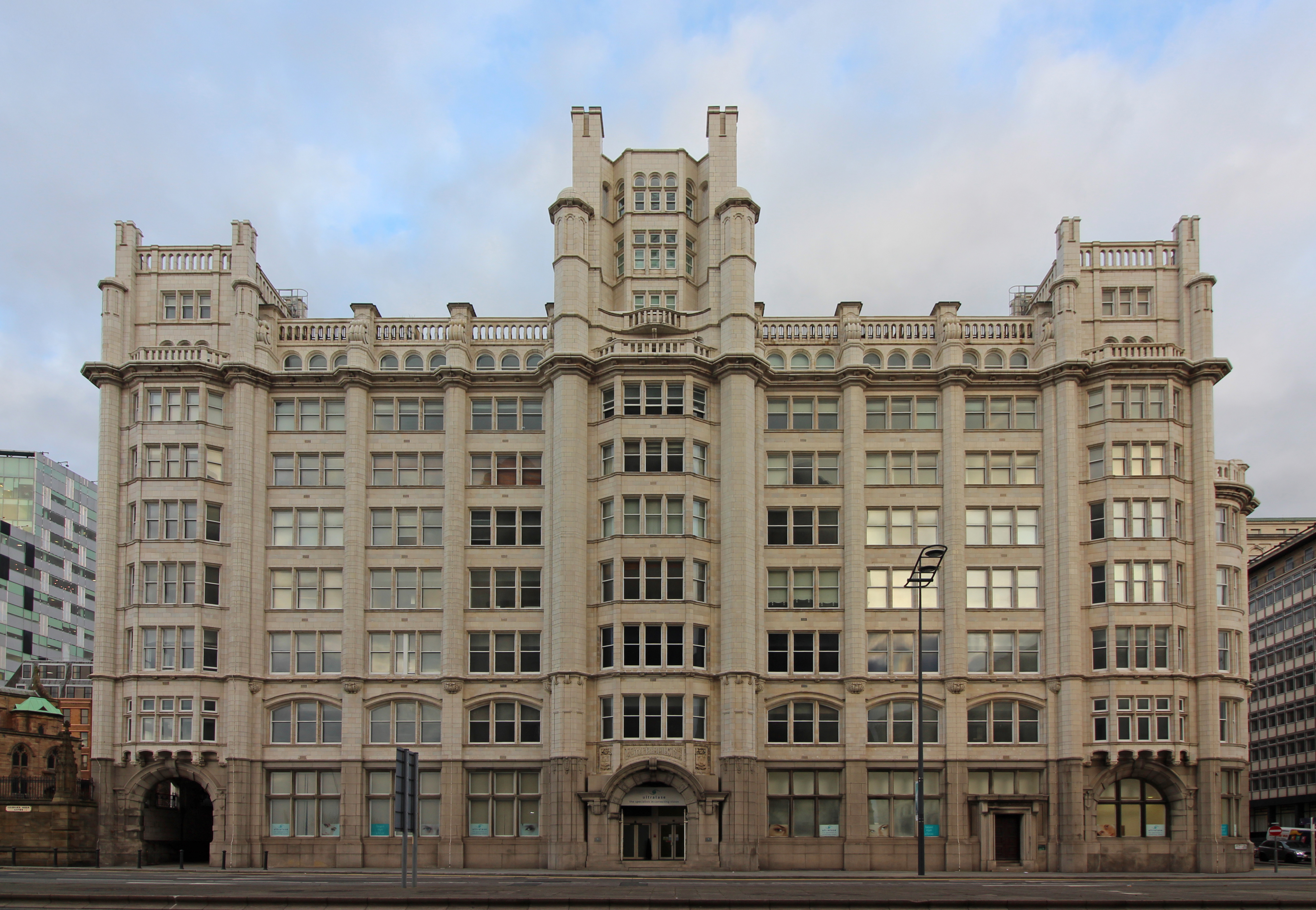
- Tower Building on George's Dock Gates

General information
- Location: Liverpool, England
- Coordinates: 53°24′23″N 2°59′39″W
- Year built: 1906–10

Design and construction
- Architect: Walter Aubrey Thomas
- Designations

Listed Building – Grade II*
- Official name: Tower Building
- Designated: 14 March 1975
- Reference no.: 1360220

Tower Building is a Grade II* listed apartment block in Liverpool, England. It stands with its longer front on the east side of the Strand, and extends round the corner into Water Street. The building is located directly opposite the Royal Liver Building, which was designed by the same architect, Walter Aubrey Thomas. The structure was originally designed for use as an office building, and is one of the earliest steel-framed buildings in England. It has been converted into apartments and units for commercial and retail use.

Earlier buildings on the site have been a sandstone mansion, and a later fortified house known as the Tower of Liverpool. After this was demolished in 1819, it was replaced in 1846 by the first structure to be named Tower Building. Details of the current building's architecture reflect the earlier fortified building on the site.

== History ==
The building stands on a historic site in the city. The first structure on the site had been a sandstone mansion, built in 1256 on the shore of the River Mersey. Its first owner is not known, but by 1360 it was owned by Sir Robert Lathom. By the beginning of the 15th century it was owned by Sir John Stanley. In 1406 Sir John gained permission from King Henry IV to build a fortified house, which was named the Tower of Liverpool. The Stanley family later became the Earls of Derby. By 1737 the house was being leased from the Earl of Derby by Liverpool Corporation. In 1745 part of it was converted into a prison, and the upper rooms were used for civic functions. In 1774 the Corporation bought the building outright. A new prison was built on Great Howard Street, and the building ceased to be used for this purpose in 1811. It was demolished in 1819 to allow for the widening of Water Street. The site was used for a row of warehouses, until in 1846 the first structure to be known as Tower Building was built to a design by Sir James Picton. The present building was designed in 1906 by Walter Aubrey Thomas, and its construction was completed in 1910. Thomas also designed the Royal Liver Building. Tower Building was one of the first steel-framed buildings in England. In 2006 it was converted into apartments, and into units for commercial and retail use.

== Architecture ==
Tower Building is constructed on a steel frame. It is clad in grey granite, and faced with white glazed terracotta made by Doulton. The Strand front has eight storeys and nine bays, the Water Street front has five storeys plus attics and three bays, and there is a curved bay on the corner. The bays are divided by polygonal turrets. On each end of the Strand front is a two-storey tower, and above the central bay rises a three-storey tower. A balustrade runs along the top of the building and around the two lateral towers. At the corners of the towers are castellated turrets, which create a link with the former Tower of Liverpool. Tower Building is recorded in the National Heritage List for England as a designated Grade II* listed building.

== See also ==
- Architecture of Liverpool
- Grade II* listed buildings in Liverpool – City Centre
