= Liverpool and London and Globe Building =

Grade II listed building in Liverpool, England

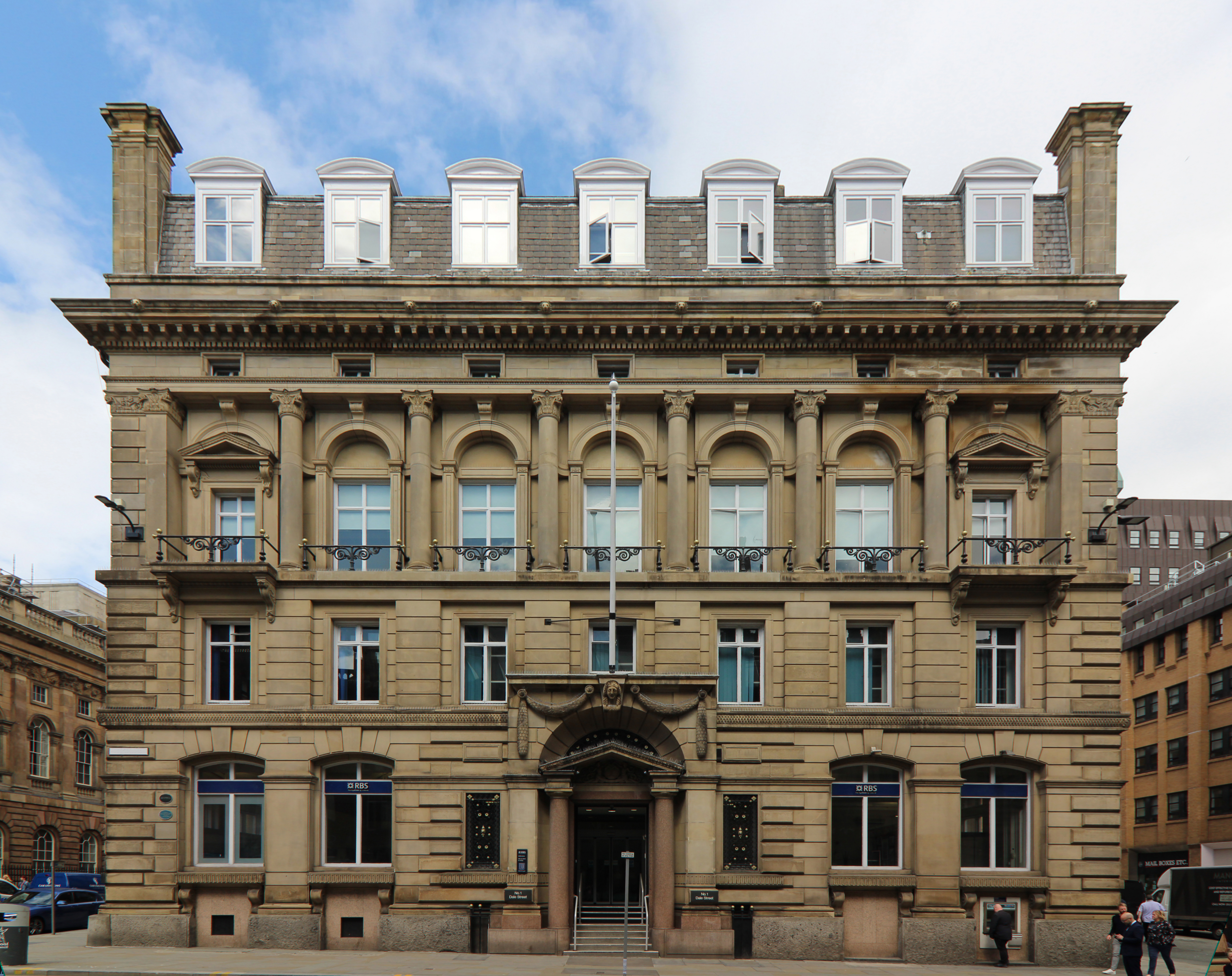

- Location in Liverpool
- 53.40745°N 2.99115°W
- Location: Dale Street, Liverpool, Merseyside, England
- OS grid reference: SJ 342 905

History
- Built: 1856–58
- Built for: Liverpool and London Insurance Company

Site notes
- Architect(s): C. R. Cockerell, F. P. Cockerell, Christopher F. Heyward

Listed Building – Grade II
- Designated: 28 June 1952
- Reference no.: 1356318

The Liverpool and London and Globe Building is located in Dale Street, Liverpool, Merseyside, England. It fills a block adjacent to the Town Hall, bounded to the northeast by Exchange Street East and to the southwest by High Street.

== History ==
The building was constructed between 1856 and 1858 for the Liverpool and London and Globe Insurance Company. The architect was C. R. Cockerell, who was assisted by his son F. P. Cockerell, and by Christopher F. Heyward. An attic storey was added to the building in the 1920s.

The building was used by the Royal Bank of Scotland up until 2022. It has since been converted into a three-floor hospitality venue and office space.

== Architecture ==
It is constructed in ashlar, with rusticated quoins and a slate roof. The building is in three storeys with a basement and attics. The Dale Street front has seven bays, and there are 15 bays along the sides. The entrance in Dale Street is flanked by red granite Doric columns. The windows in the ground floor have segmental arches. Those in the second floor are recessed behind a Corinthian colonnade with balconies. The building has a Mansard roof with dormers. It is recorded in the National Heritage List for England as a designated Grade II listed building.

== See also ==
Architecture of Liverpool
