= Dale Street =

Street in Liverpool, England

Dale Street, Liverpool
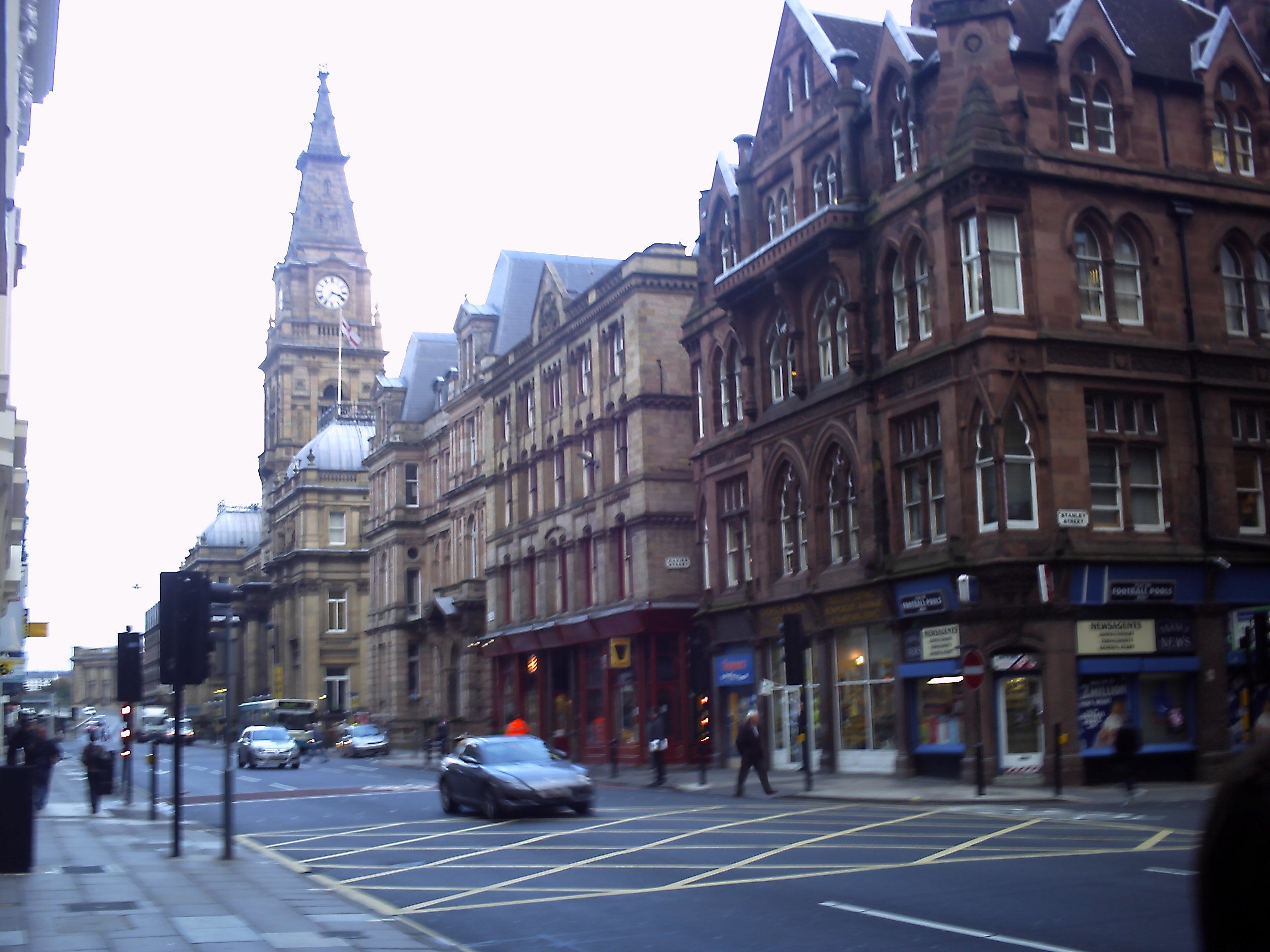
- Dale Street with Municipal Buildings tower in the distance

- Location within Liverpool
- Location: Liverpool city centre
- Postal code: L2
- Coordinates: 53.408°N 2.987°W

Other
- Known for: Offices, hotels, restaurants, historic buildings

Dale Street is a thoroughfare in Liverpool city centre, England.

== History ==
The street was one of the original seven streets that made up the medieval borough founded by King John in 1207, together with Castle Street, Old Hall Street, Chapel Street, High Street, Tithebarn Street and Water Street. It contains many Grade II listed buildings.

The road is situated on what was the site of Lyver Pool, a natural creek that made up the original dock for Liverpool. The original street, as with many of the original streets of Liverpool was very narrow. It was not until a special Act was passed in 1786 that Dale Street was widened up to Moorfields, as part of a scheme to clear housing away from the town hall. A this point in time, Dale Street contained several key coaching inns, such as the George, Golden Lion and the Angel. Forming one of the main routes through the city, it saw around eighty coaches a day leaving for places such as London, Manchester and Birmingham.

The road widened further in 1820 as part of Liverpool Corporation works, headed by architect John Foster.

Alois Hitler Jr, the half brother of Adolf Hitler, ran a restaurant there. Bridget Hitler, the wife of Alois, maintained that Adolf lived with them in Liverpool from 1912 to 1913 while he was on the run for dodging the draft in his native Austria-Hungary.

In 1970, the Churchill Way Flyovers were opened, linking Dale Street and Tithebarn Street to Lime Street. Built as part of an inner-city ring road project that was never fully completed, the flyovers were demolished in 2019 having been deemed unsafe.

== Grade II Listed buildings ==
- Liverpool, London and Globe Building
- Union Marine Buildings
- Saddle Inn
- Rigby's Buildings
- Guardian Assurance Buildings
- Nos. 51 to 55 ( odd )
- Magistrates' Courts
- Nos. 135 to 139 ( odd )
- Queen's Buildings
- State Insurance Building
- The Temple
- Prudential Assurance Building
- Buckleys Building
- Muskar's Buildings
- Imperial Chambers
- Municipal Annexe
- Municipal Buildings
- Nos. 86 to 98
