= Water Street, Liverpool =

Road in Liverpool, England

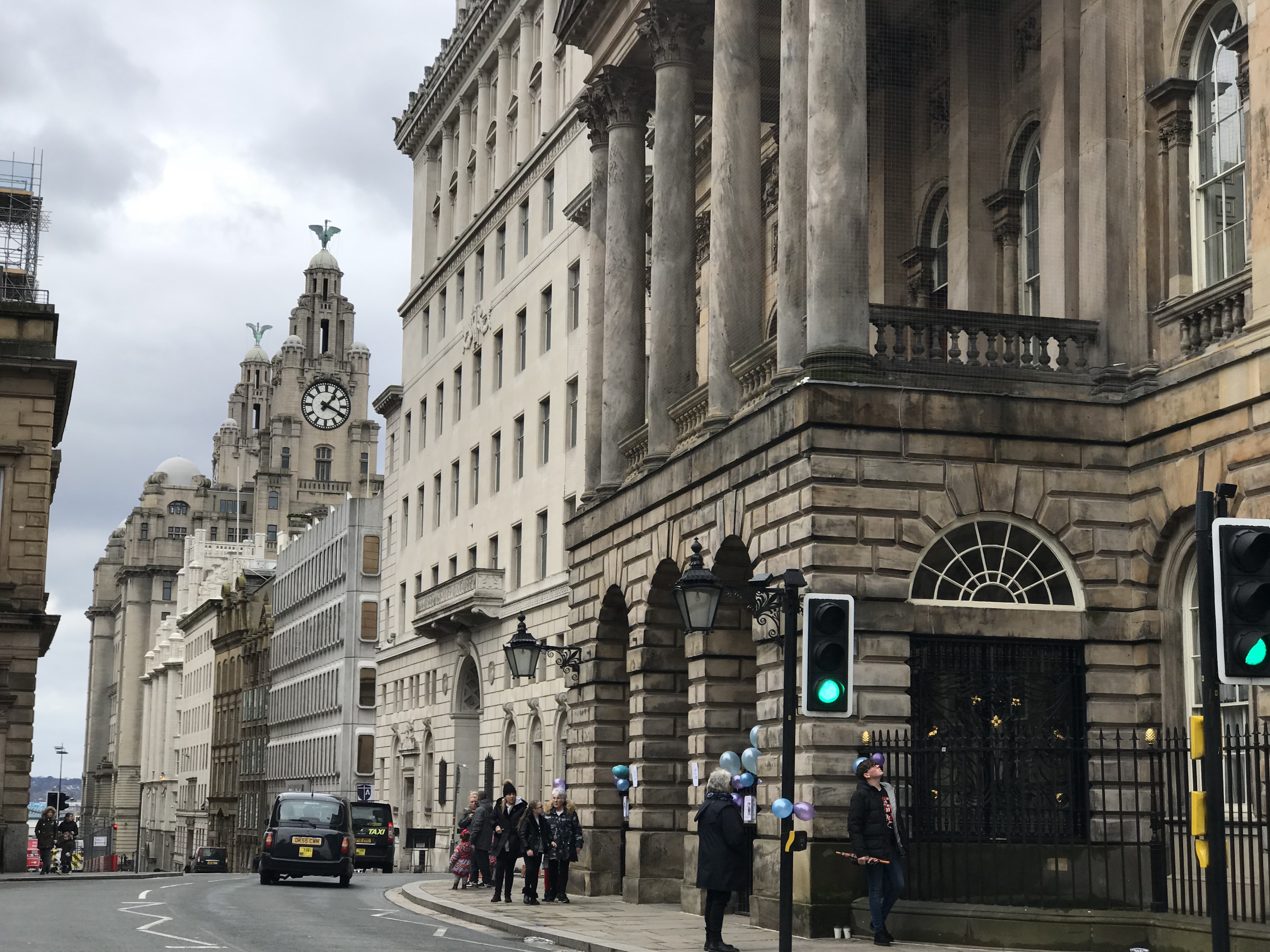
- Looking down Water Street towards the Royal Liver Building

- Location within Liverpool
- Location: Liverpool city centre
- Postal code: L2
- Coordinates: 53.4062°N 2.9935°W

Other
- Known for: Offices, restaurants, bars

Water Street is a road in Liverpool, England. Situated in the city centre, it runs from Dale Street to the Pier Head at the River Mersey.

== History ==
The street was one of the original seven streets that made up the medieval borough founded by King John in 1207, together with Castle Street, Old Hall Street, Chapel Street, High Street, Tithebarn Street and Dale Street. It was originally known as Bonk Street ('Bonk' being Lancastrian dialect for 'bank'), then Bank Street, and in the 1520s it was named Water Street.

Liverpool's third custom house was situated at the bottom of Water Street in the 1700s, later being demolished when a new custom house was built with the creation of the Old Dock. In the 1790s, the Royal Mail Coach ran from Talbot Inn on Water Street, traveling to London in around 27 hours.

Liverpool Tower was situated close to Water Street, and it was the widening of Water Street in 1820 that had led to the tower's demolition the previous year.

On 26 May 2025, a man drove into a crowd of pedestrians on the street during a victory parade for Liverpool F.C.'s win in the Premier League. According to Merseyside Police, 79 people were injured, 50 of whom were taken to hospital, and a 53-year-old white British man from West Derby was detained at the scene.

== Grade II Listed buildings ==
Water Street contains some of Liverpool's most renowned buildings, including:

- Cunard Building
- General Accident Building
- India Buildings
- Liver Building
- Martins Bank Building
- Midshires Building Society
- Oriel Chambers

== In popular culture ==
=== Moby-Dick ===
Water Street is mentioned in chapter 6 of Herman Melville's 1851 novel, Moby-Dick. Melville had used William Scoresby's 1820s book An Account of the Arctic Regions as a factual source for Moby-Dick. Scoresby's book details how the city of Liverpool was involved in whaling.

=== Filming ===
Liverpool's place as the second most filmed city in the UK has led to Water Street being used in many film and TV productions. Water Street has featured in such films as Florence Foster Jenkins, Fast and Furious 6, The 51st State and Jack Ryan: Shadow Recruit.
