= Exchange Flags =

Building in Liverpool, England

Coordinates: 53.40759°N 2.99205°W

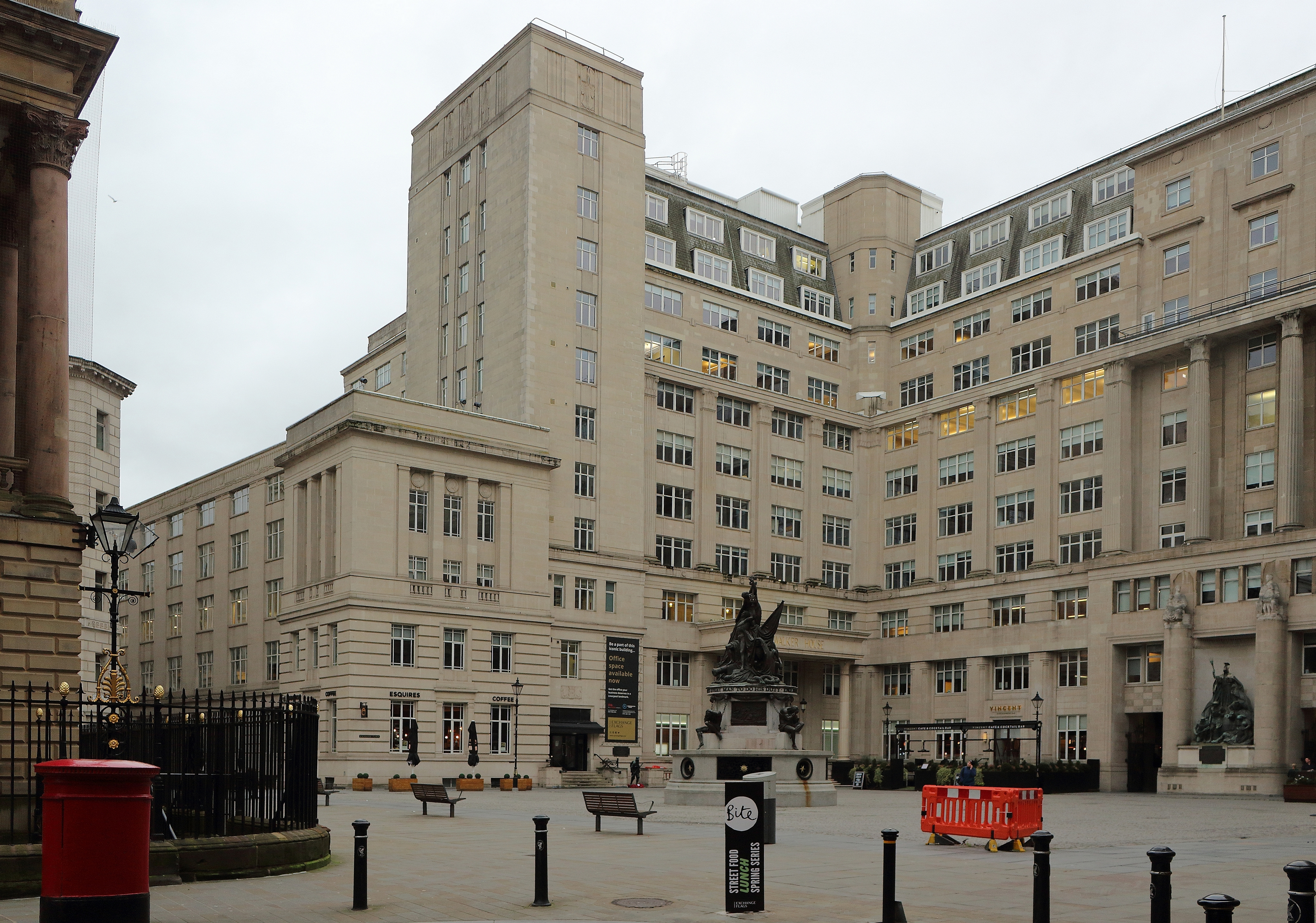
- Alternative names: Western Approaches Command Headquarters, Exchange Flags; Walker House, Exchange Flags; Horton House, Exchange Flags

General information
- Type: Commercial offices, museum & restaurants & bars
- Architectural style: Stripped classical
- Location: Liverpool, England, United Kingdom
- Completed: 1939
- Owner: Ashtrom

Design and construction
- Architect(s): Gunton and Gunton

Exchange Flags is a Grade II listed building in Liverpool, England. It is laid out in a 'U' shape, with Walker House situated on the west side and Horton House on the east side. Walker House (formerly known as Derby House) was adapted during its construction to include a reinforced bunker that housed the Western Approaches Command Headquarters, the command centre for the campaign waged against the German submarine fleet during the Second World War. The courtyard faces Liverpool Town Hall and contains the Nelson Monument.

== History ==
The current buildings sit on the same site of two previous exchanges in Liverpool:

- Exchange Buildings (1864–67; demolished 1939)
- Exchange Buildings (1803–08; demolished 1864)

The building has eleven storeys and has a combination of flat and mansard roofs. Construction of the main building was completed in 1939 but the construction of Walker House was interrupted by the war. The inclusion of the reinforced bunker to house the command centre for the Battle of the Atlantic meant that Walker House wasn't finished until 1941. The two storey underground bunker covers an area of 55,000 square feet (5,100 m^{2}) and had a staff of over 1,000 Royal Air Force and Royal Navy personnel. Ventilation to the bunker was provided via a ventilation shaft that was built into the Nelson Monument. The bunker was closed on 15 August 1945 after the end of the war but was re-opened in 1993 as the Western Approaches Museum.

Horton House was not completed until 1955 and is named after Admiral Sir Max Horton who was commander-in-chief of the Western Approaches during the war.

The site was purchased in the late 1980s by Liverpool businessman Bill Davies, the former owner of Aintree Racecourse. The building was left largely empty until it was sold in two separate deals in 2006 and 2007. Shelbourne Asset Management bought the site in 2017 for £42m and sold it to its current owners, Ashtrom, for £68m in August 2019.

== See also ==
Architecture of Liverpool
