= St Paul's Square, Liverpool =

Square in Liverpool, England

Coordinates: 53.4100°N 2.9941°W

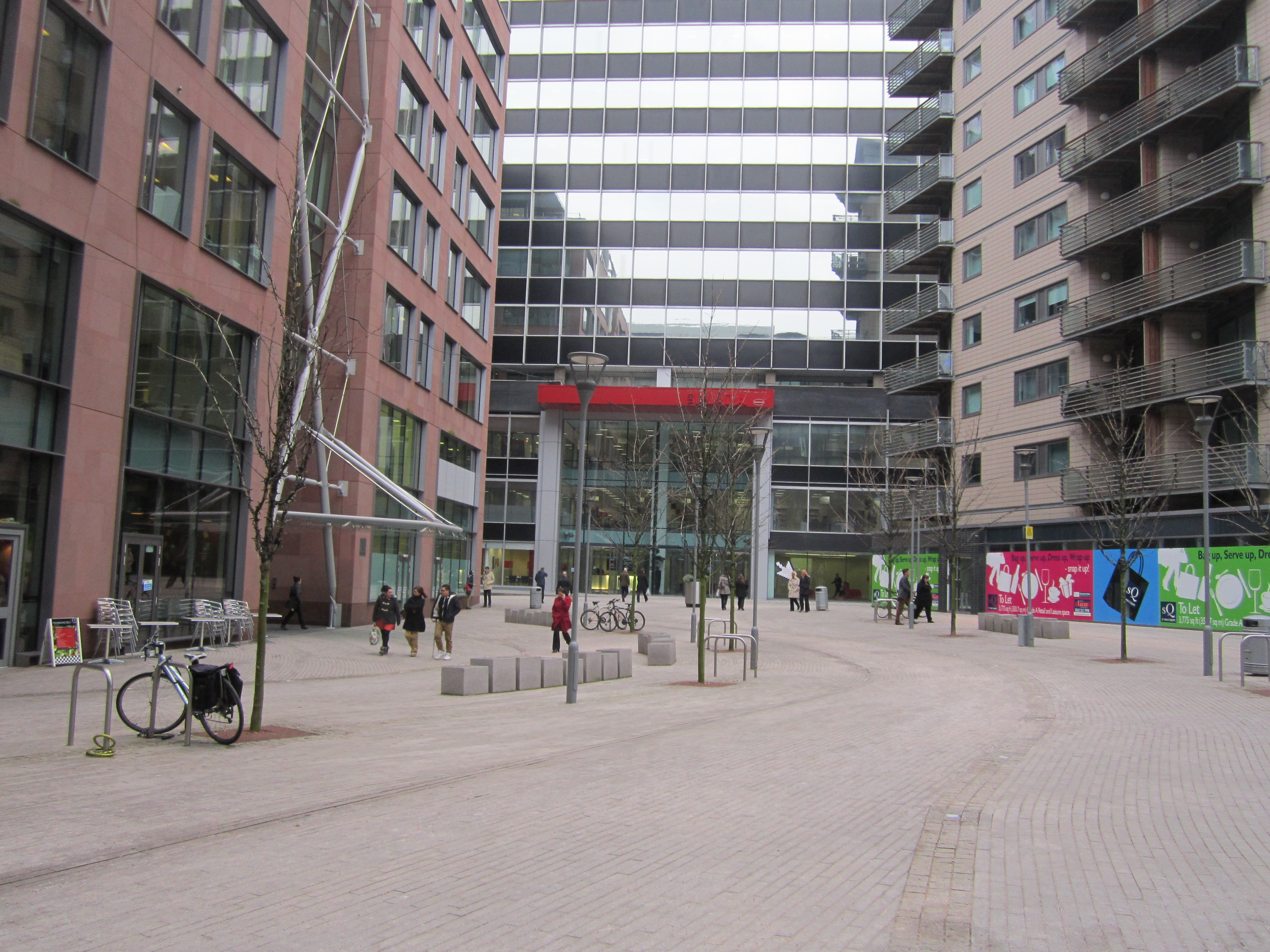
St Paul's Square

St Paul's Square is a square in Liverpool City Centre and is bordered by Old Hall Street, East Street and Rigby Street.

== History ==
The square takes its name from St. Paul's Church, which originally stood on the site. Designed by Timothy Lightholer and built around 1709, it was designed as a miniature imitation of St Paul's, London.

The church served what would have been an affluent area of the city. Towards the end of the 17th century Old Hall Street and St Paul's Square were fashionable areas for the merchants of the city and residencies were built on Old Hall Street during this period, stretching up towards St Paul's Square.

As the city of Liverpool grew with the rapid expansion of the port, the area became heavily populated and many of the Georgian Terraces were converted into multi-occupancy residences. The east-side of the square was demolished in the late 1840s to make way for the construction of Liverpool Exchange railway station. By the 19th century, the church found itself with dwindling congregations and it was closed in 1901, before being demolished in 1931.

St. Paul's Eye and Ear Infirmary was originally on Old Hall Street in 1871 but moved to 6, St. Paul's Square. The hospital stayed there, except during World War 2 when it was moved to Childwall, until 1992 when it was moved to Royal Liverpool Hospital.

The square was the site of a 3,700 capacity boxing arena, known as Liverpool Stadium, which was the first of its kind in Great Britain. Built on the site of the former graveyard of St Paul's Church, the venue opened on 20 October 1932. In addition to boxing, the venue hosted concerts by The Beatles, David Bowie, and Lou Reed as well as the 1951 Conservative Party Conference. The venue closed in 1985 and was demolished two years' later.

Today, the square is part of Liverpool's central business district and is the home to offices for some of the city's legal and financial firms.
