= Nelson Monument, Liverpool =

1813 monument in Liverpool, England

Nelson Monument
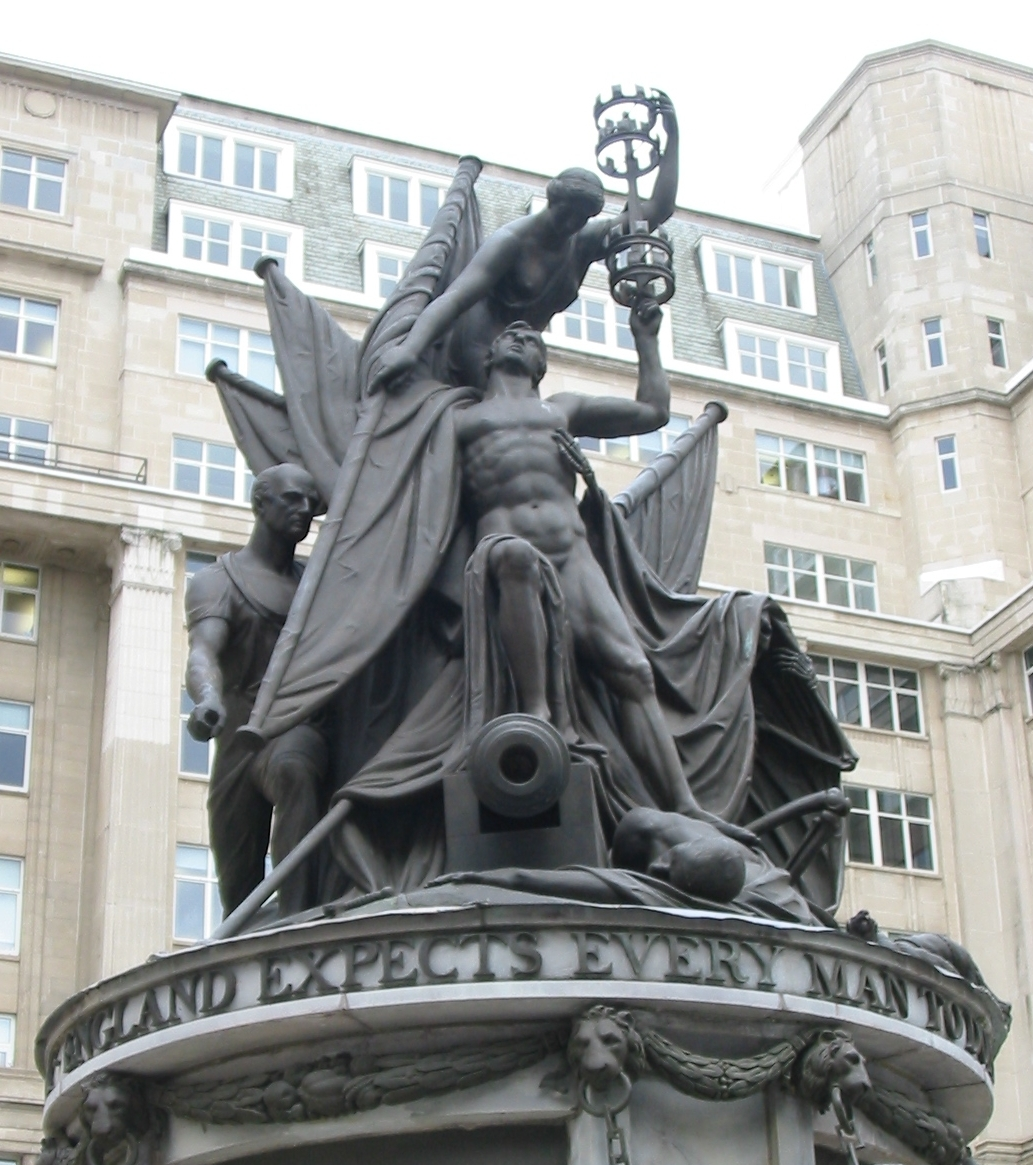
- The monument in 2008
- Interactive map of the Nelson Monument area

General information
- Location: Exchange Flags, Liverpool, England
- Coordinates: 53.4076°N 2.9920°W
- Construction started: 1812
- Completed: 1813

Design and construction
- Architects: Matthew Cotes Wyatt (designer); Richard Westmacott (sculptor)
- Designations

Listed Building – Grade II*
- Official name: Nelson Monument
- Designated: 14 March 1975
- Reference no.: 1068235

The Nelson Monument is a monument to Admiral Horatio Nelson, in Exchange Flags, Liverpool, England. It was designed by Matthew Cotes Wyatt and sculpted by Richard Westmacott. It stands to the north of the Town Hall and was unveiled in 1813.

== History ==
In 1805 Liverpool City Council resolved to commemorate Nelson's victory at the Battle of Trafalgar by erecting a monument and voted to pay £1,000 towards its design and construction. A public subscription fund was launched and within two months a total of £8,930 (equivalent to £670,000 in 2025) had been reached; this included £750 from the underwriters at Lloyd's and £500 from the West India Association. It was agreed that the monument should be located in a prominent site near the Exchange. A competition for its design was arranged, and this was won by Matthew Cotes Wyatt, son of James Wyatt, the contract being signed in 1809. Matthew Wyatt was relatively inexperienced, and was assisted by Richard Westmacott. (Note: It is uncertain what part each of these played in the design and in the casting process.) The first stone was laid on 15 July 1812, and the monument was unveiled on 21 October 1813, the eighth anniversary of Nelson's death. In 1866 the monument was moved to its present site in Exchange Flags to allow for an extension to the Exchange Buildings, and the Westmorland stone base was replaced by one in granite.

As part of the construction of a bunker under Exchange Flags to house Western Approaches Command, a ventilation shaft was constructed under the monument, allowing airflow into the bunker below.

For the 2023 Eurovision song contest celebrations, the monument was surrounded by 2,500 sandbags as part of an art installation called Protect the Beats. This was to reflect statues in Ukraine which were covered up to protect them from damage during the Russian invasion.

== Description ==
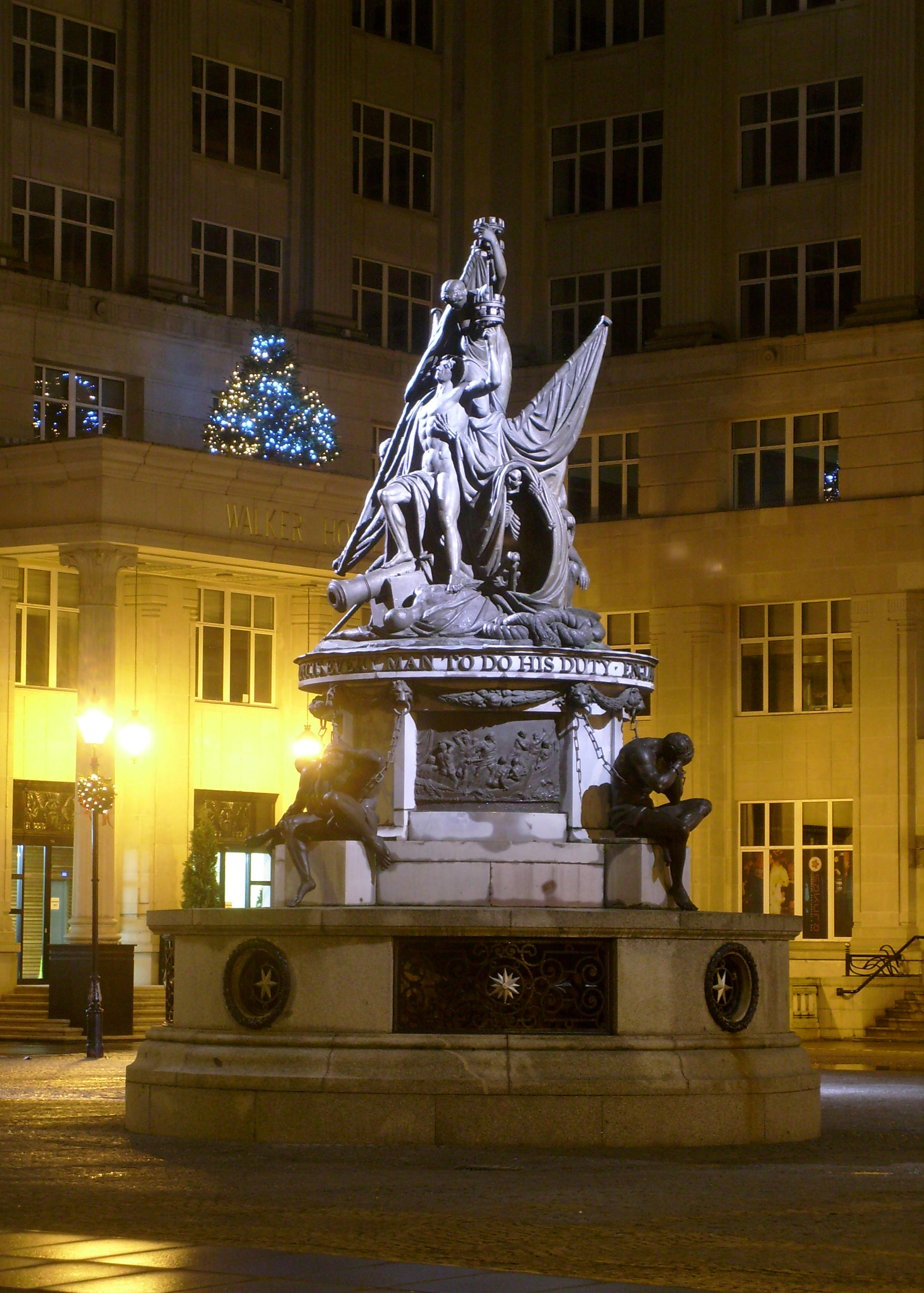
The monument at night

The monument consists of a bronze statue on a stone base. Its overall height is 29 feet (8.8 m), and the circumference of the base is 95 feet 4 inches (29.1 m). The base consists of a drum-shaped pedestal in Westmorland marble 8 feet 10 inches (2.7 m) tall, standing on a granite basement 6 feet (1.8 m) tall. (Note: Set in the sides of the basement are iron grills providing ventilation to the space below Exchange Flags, originally a warehouse, and later a car park.) Seated around the pedestal are four statues depicting manacled prisoners sitting in poses of sadness; they represent Nelson's major victories, the battles of Cape St Vincent, the Nile, Copenhagen, and Trafalgar. Set into the drum between the statues are four bronze bas-reliefs depicting other naval actions in which Nelson was involved. Encircling the pedestal above the statues are swags of laurel hanging from behind lions' heads. Attached to rings in the lions' mouths are chains that descend to manacle the prisoners. At the top of the pedestal is a cornice with an inscription in metal letters reading ENGLAND EXPECTS EVERY MAN TO DO HIS DUTY.

On top of the pedestal is a bronze group of figures 14 feet 2 inches (4.3 m) tall, each figure being 7 feet (2.1 m) in height, and forming a roughly pyramidal structure. There are five figures surrounded by the drapes and poles of captured flags, with an anchor and a rope on the ground. An idealised nude representation of Nelson, his amputated right arm covered by part of a flag, stands with one foot on a cannon and the other on an enemy's corpse, holding upright a sword on which Victory is placing the last of four crowns. (Note: The four crowns represent Nelson's four major victories.) To the right of Nelson is the figure of Death reaching out to touch him. On the left of Nelson is a British seaman striding forward. Behind Nelson is the figure of Britannia holding a laurel wreath and Nelson's decorations.

The monument was the first item of public sculpture to be erected in Liverpool, and is recorded in the National Heritage List for England as a designated Grade II* listed building. Grade II* is the middle of the three grades of designation for listed buildings and is applied to "particularly important buildings of more than special interest".

== See also ==
- Grade II* listed buildings in Liverpool – City Centre
- List of public art in Liverpool
- Monuments and memorials to Horatio Nelson, 1st Viscount Nelson

== Notes and references ==
Notes

Citations
