= Old Hall Street =

Road in Liverpool, England

Old Hall Street, Liverpool
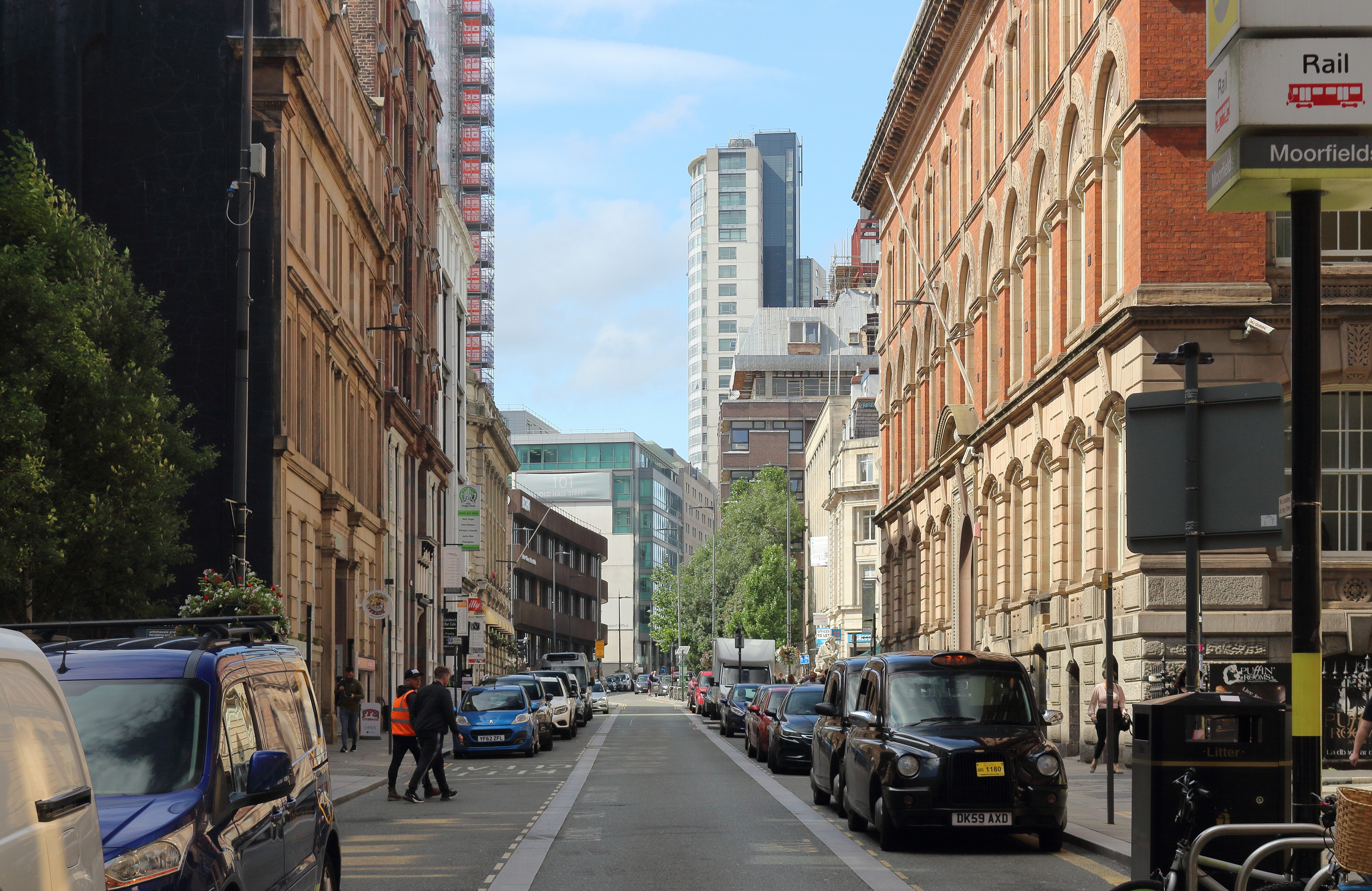
- Old Hall Street, pictured from outside Moorfields station

- Location within Liverpool
- Location: Liverpool city centre
- Postal code: L2
- Coordinates: 53.4098°N 2.9975°W

Other
- Known for: Offices, hotels, restaurants, bars

Old Hall Street is a road in Liverpool, England. Situated in the city centre, it runs between Leeds Street and Chapel Street and is part of Liverpool business district.

== History ==
The street was one of the original seven streets that made up the medieval borough founded by King John in 1207, together with Water Street, Castle Street, Chapel Street, High Street, Tithebarn Street and Dale Street.

The 'old hall' that Old Hall Street gets its name from was originally on Mill Street, a street that dated back to the 13th century. Towards the end of the 17th century, and now known as Old Hall Street, it became a fashionable area for the merchants of the city and residencies were built on Old Hall Street during this period, stretching up towards St Paul's Square.

The original Cotton Exchange Building was situated on Old Hall Street, opening in 1906. The opening was performed by Prince and Princess of Wales and was attended by 3,000 guests. The front of the building was replaced with a modern façade between 1967 and 1969, which still stands today.

St Paul's Eye Hospital was originally sited on Pall Mall but moved to Old Hall Street in 1912. The hospital remained on Old Hall Street until 1992, when it moved to the Royal Liverpool Hospital.

The Liverpool Echo and Daily Post offices were situated on Old Hall Street from 1974 in the Post & Echo Building. The Liverpool Echo moved to its current home on St Paul's Square in 2018. Constructed at the same time as the Post & Echo Building, New Hall Place was built for Royal Insurance. The building is now used by the Home Office and RSA Insurance Group.

During the 1970s, two footbridges were built on the street as part of Liverpool's skyway project. The bridges linked Moorfields railway station with One Old Hall Street and the ECHO and Royal Insurance buildings to a building on the other side of the street called Ralli House. The skyway project was deemed a failure and both bridges had been removed by the end of 2000.

The closure of Liverpool Exchange railway station and the subsequent creation of Moorfields station saw an entrance to the new station open on Old Hall Street in May 1977.

== Listed buildings ==
Old Hall Street contains several Grade II listed buildings, including:

- The Albany Building
- Cotton Exchange Building
- 91 and 93 Old Hall Street
