= 62 Castle Street =

Office building in Liverpool, England

Coordinates: 53°24′20.4″N 2°59′26.8″W

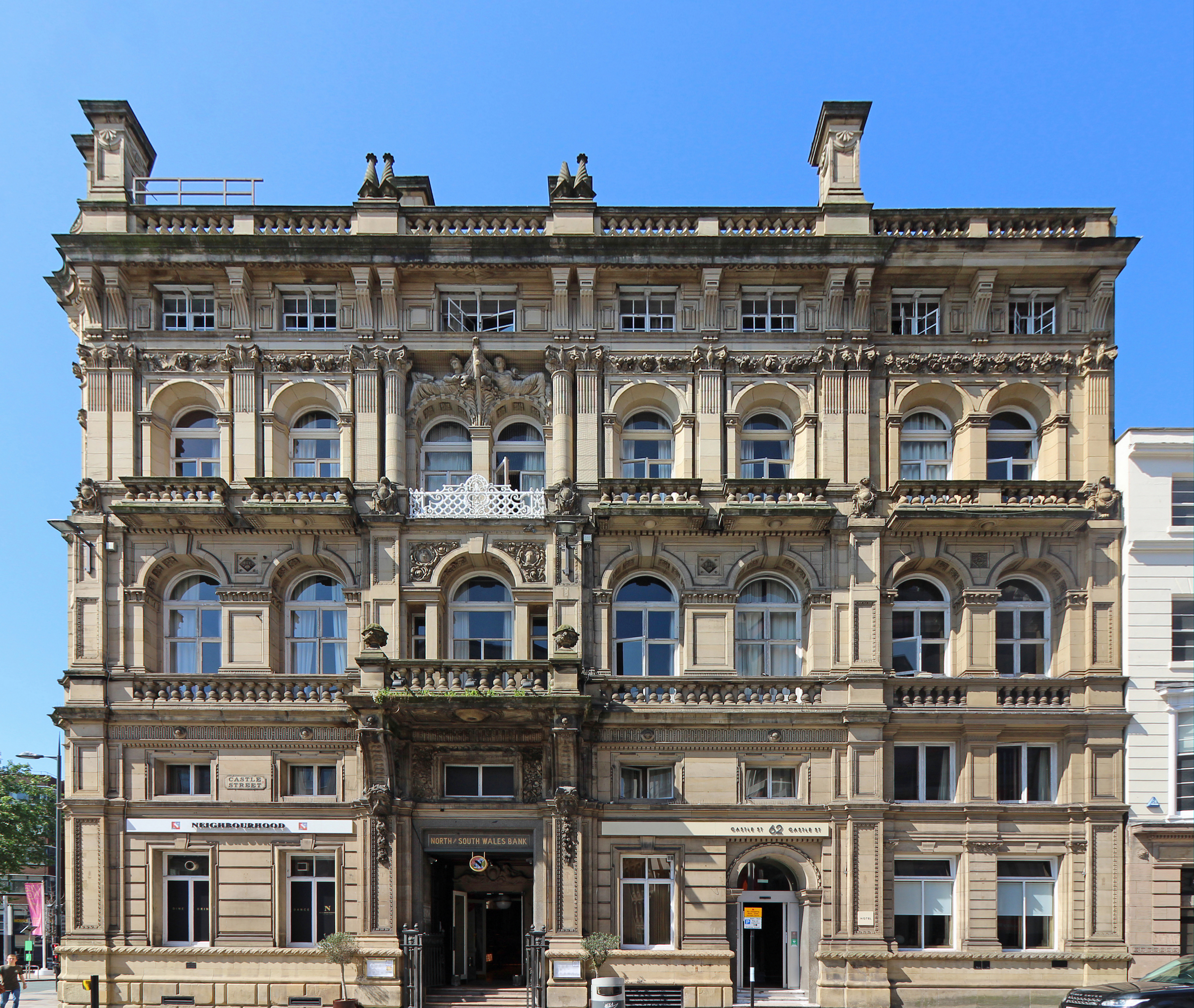
Front elevation on Castle Street

62 Castle Street is a Grade II listed building located on the west side of Castle Street, Liverpool. It was built in 1868 for the Alliance Bank and was later occupied by The North and South Wales Bank and most recently by the Midland Bank. The building was designed by the architects Lucy and Littler and features a domed banking hall with paired corinthian columns. The two bays to the right of the building are a matching addition, designed by G. E. Grayson.

After the Midland Bank had relocated to the northern end of the street, the building was converted in 1986 into a bar, restaurant and a 4-star rated, 20-bed, all-suite hotel by local businessman Wayne Rose The building was bought by Centre Island Hotels in 2004 and refurbished to its current condition as a boutique hotel named "62 Castle Street".

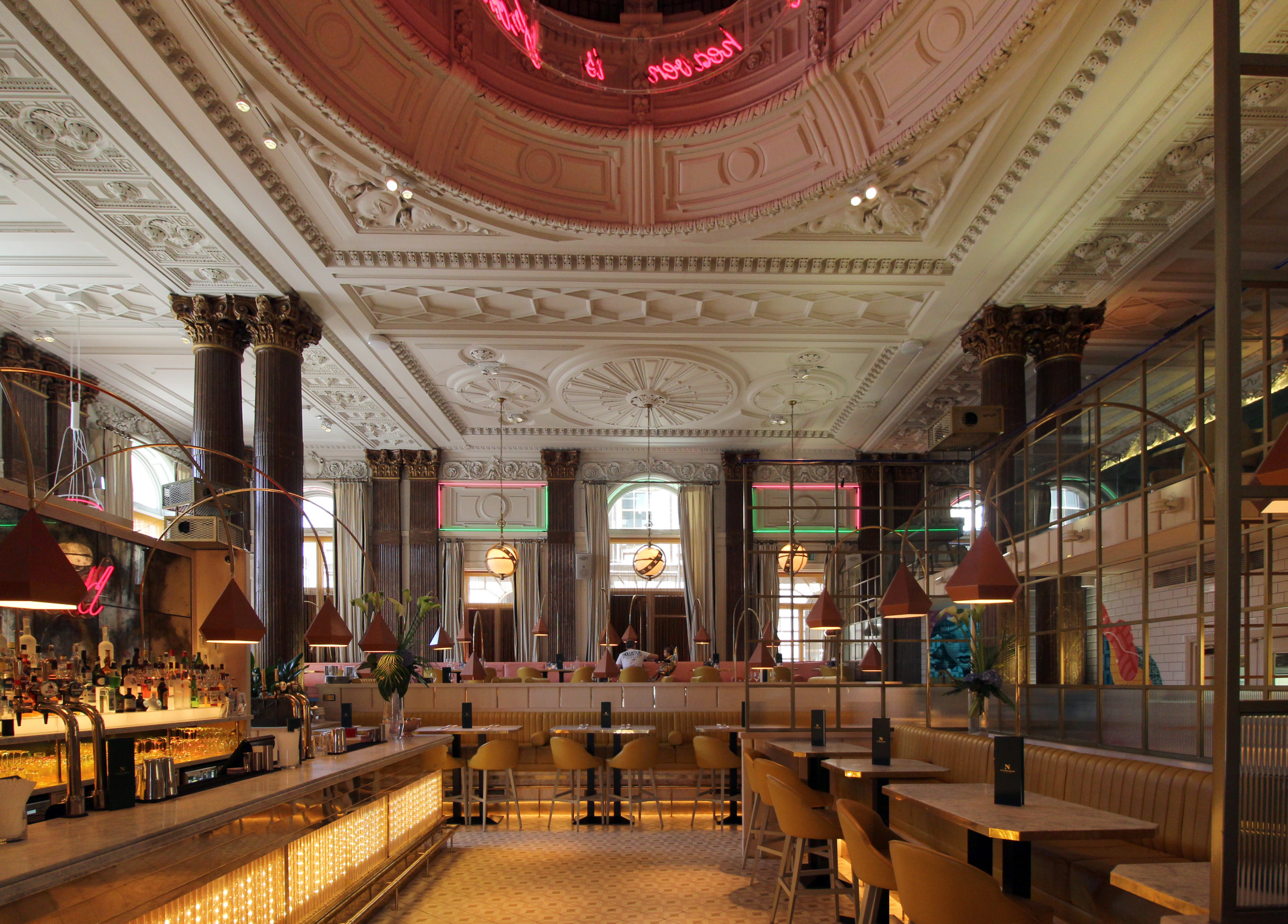
The former banking hall, now the restaurant
