= Church of All Hallows, Allerton =

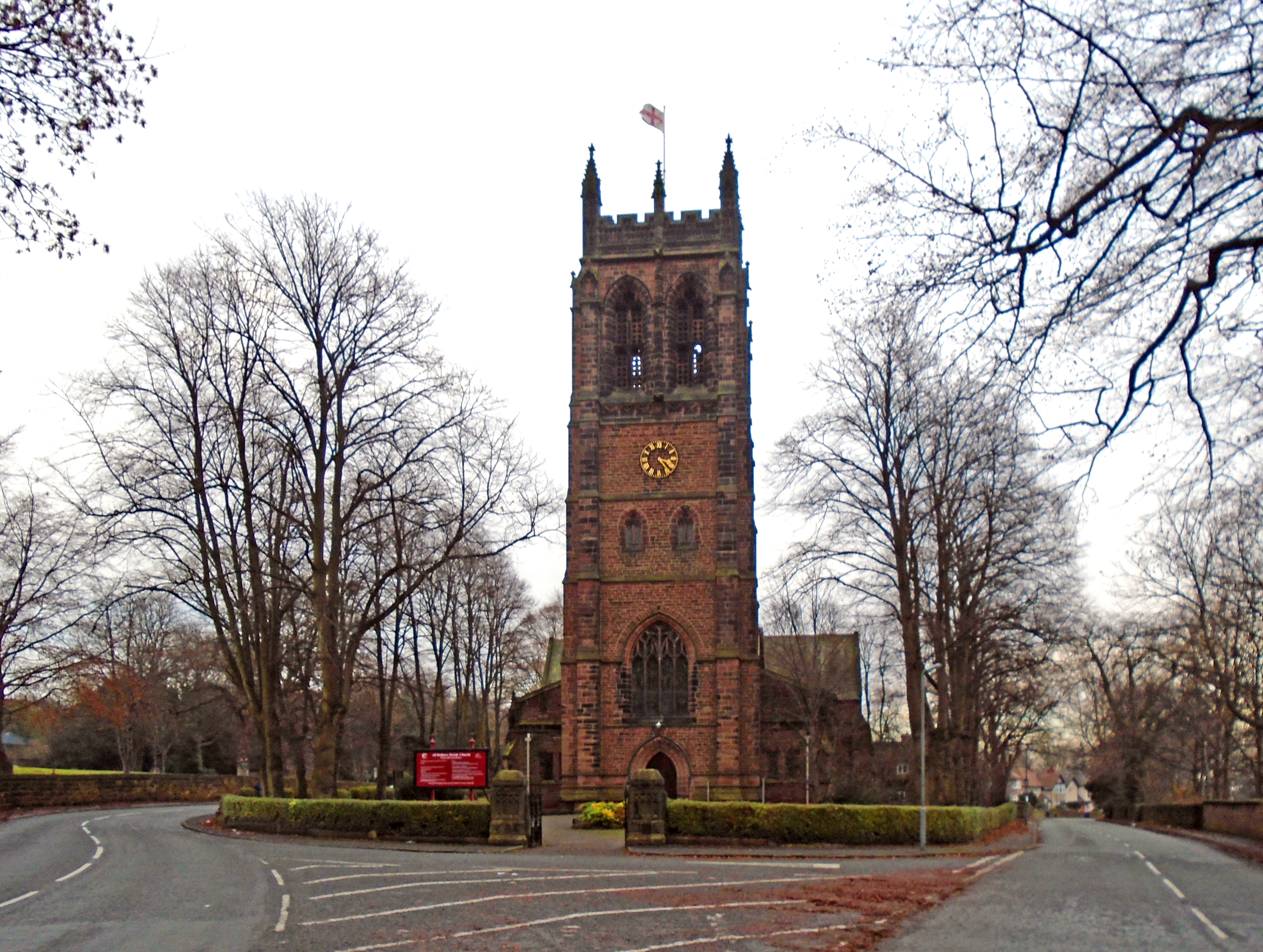
- Church of All Hallows, Allerton, from the west
- Church of All Hallows, Allerton
- 53.3807°N 2.9035°W
- OS grid reference: SJ 400 875
- Location: Allerton, Liverpool
- Country: England
- Denomination: Anglican
- Website: www.allhallowsallerton.org.uk

History
- Status: Parish church
- Dedication: All Hallows
- Consecrated: 1876

Architecture
- Functional status: Active
- Heritage designation: Grade I
- Designated: 28 June 1952
- Architect: G. E. Grayson
- Architectural type: Church
- Style: Gothic Revival
- Groundbreaking: 1872
- Completed: 1876
- Construction cost: £20,000

Specifications
- Materials: Red sandstone exterior White Storeton stone interior

Administration
- Province: York
- Diocese: Liverpool
- Archdeaconry: Liverpool
- Deanery: Liverpool South – Childwall

Clergy
- Rector: The Revd Canon Nicola Milford
- Vicar: The Revd Canon Nicola Milford

The Church of All Hallows is in Allerton, Liverpool, England. It is recorded in the National Heritage List for England as a designated Grade I listed building, and is an active Anglican parish church in the diocese of Liverpool, the archdeaconry of Liverpool and the deanery of Liverpool South – Childwall.

== History ==
The church was built at the expense of John Bibby of the Bibby Line in memory of his first wife, at a cost of £20,000 (equivalent to £2,000,000 in 2025). It was designed by G. E. Grayson. The foundation stone was laid on 31 October 1872, and the church was consecrated on 10 August 1876 by the Bishop of Chester. During the Second World War the stained glass was removed to Slaidburn for safety and replaced by plain glass. This was destroyed in an air raid and the stained glass was returned in 1946.

== Architecture ==
=== Exterior ===
The church is built with red sandstone on its exterior and white stone from Storeton on the interior. The chancel is lined with square of red and green jasper, and the chancel steps and the base of the pulpit are in black Vaulsort marble. Its architectural style is Gothic Revival, with a mixture of Decorated and Perpendicular styles. The tower is described as being a "mighty Perpendicular tower of the Somerset type".

=== Interior ===
The finest feature of the church is its stained glass. Of the 15 windows, 14 were designed by Edward Burne-Jones, with some input from William Morris, and were made by Morris & Co. Pollard and Pevsner consider that the west and east windows are the best. The east window was made in 1875–86 and depicts the Adoration of the Lamb. Burne-Jones also claimed that this was his finest piece of work. The west window depicts the Four Evangelists. The window in the south transept was built in 1879 and depicts four holy men; Noah, Moses, Daniel and St Paul. In the north transept dating from 1880 are four holy women: Mary, the sister of Aaron, Ruth the Moabitess, Queen Esther and the Blessed Virgin. The north chancel windows followed in 1881; they depict angels and are memorials windows to John Bibby's children. The eight windows in the aisles were made between 1882 and 1886 and depict incidents from the life of Jesus. The other window is at the east end of the north transept and was made by Heaton, Butler and Bayne.

Also in the church are memorials to members of the Bibby family. One represents an earlier John Bibby who died in 1811. It is by William Spence and contains a standing figure of Hope. This memorial was moved from St Thomas' Church, Seaforth in 1978. Another memorial is to Mrs Bibby by Frederigo Fabiani.

== Images ==
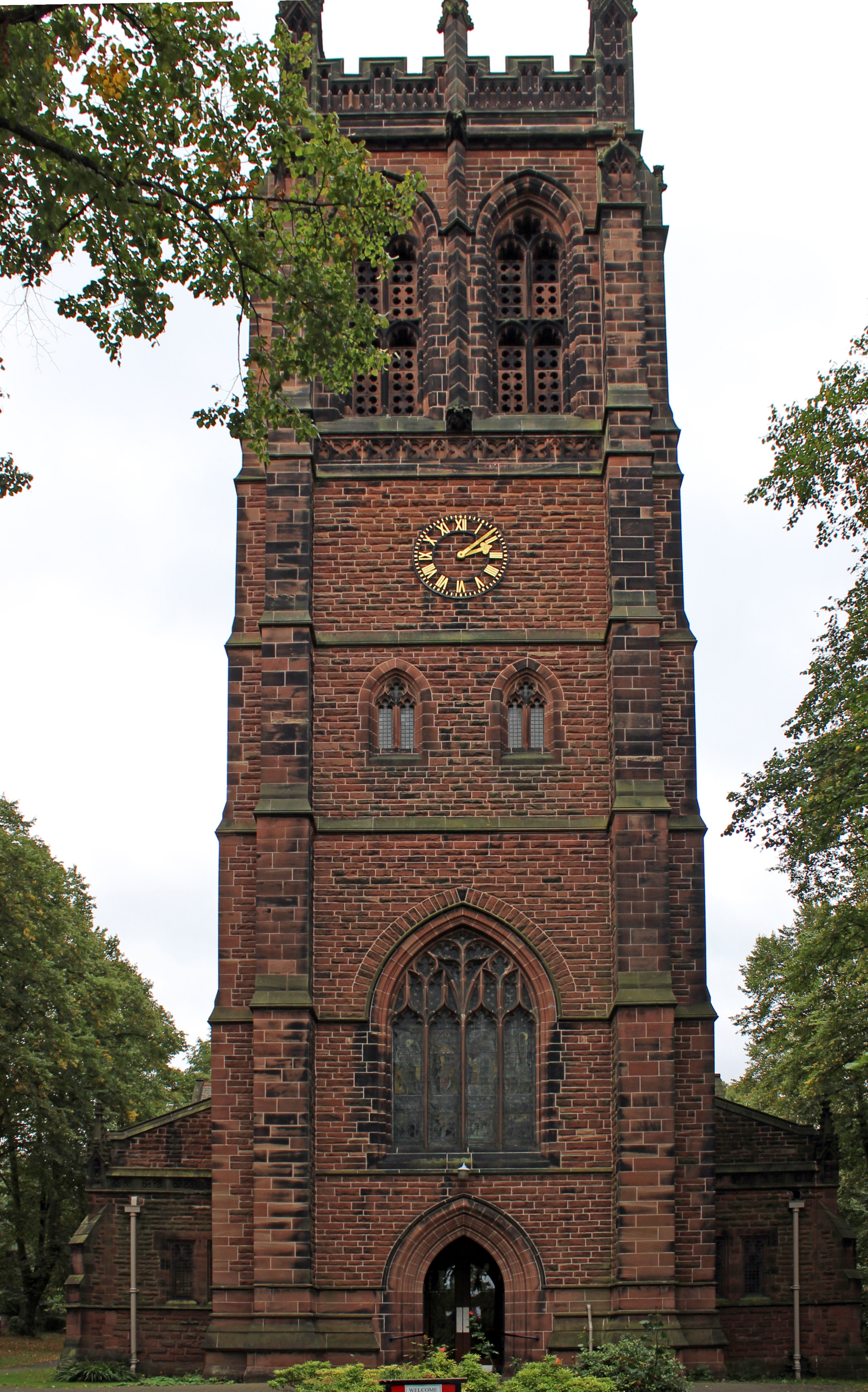
Tower

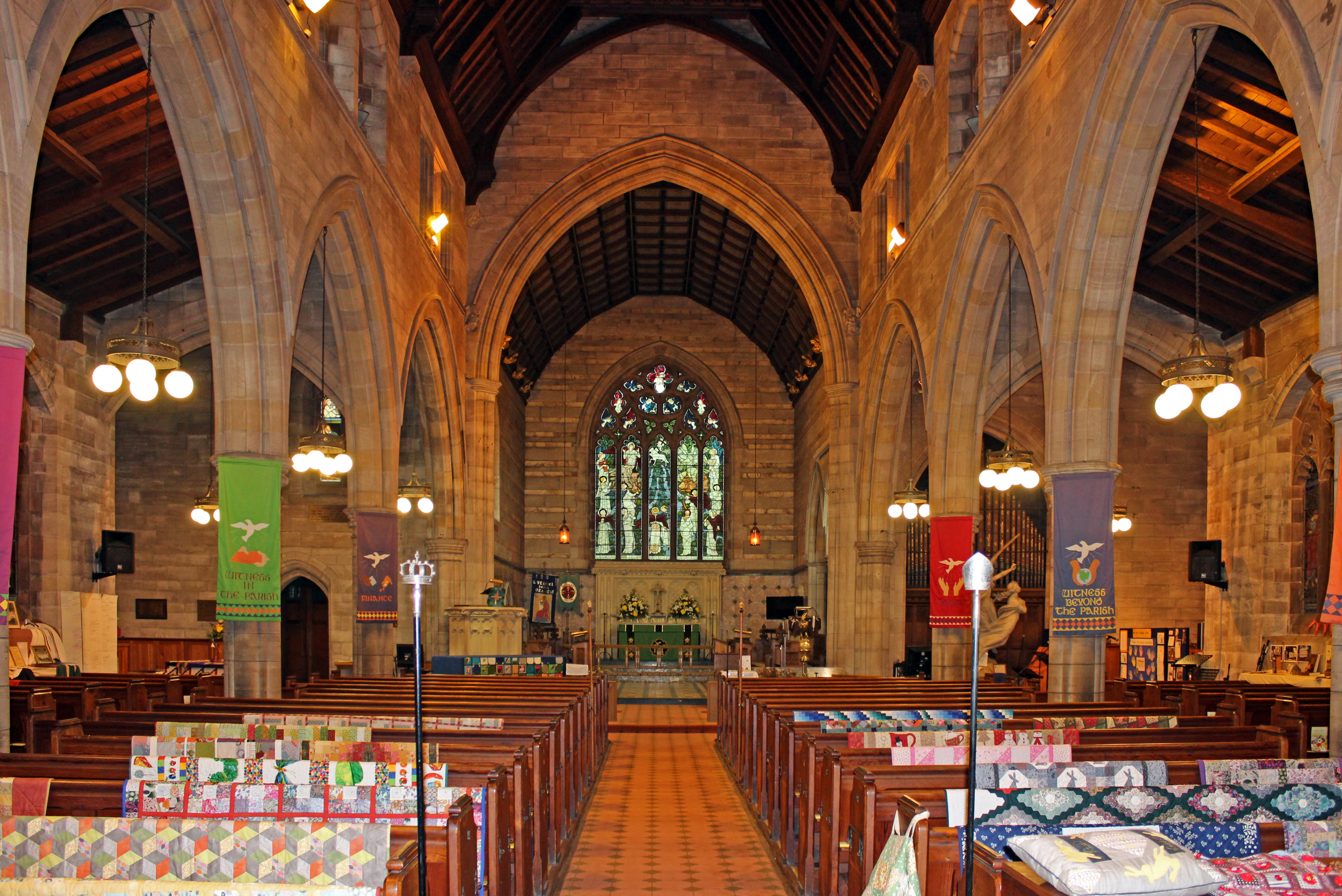
View along the nave

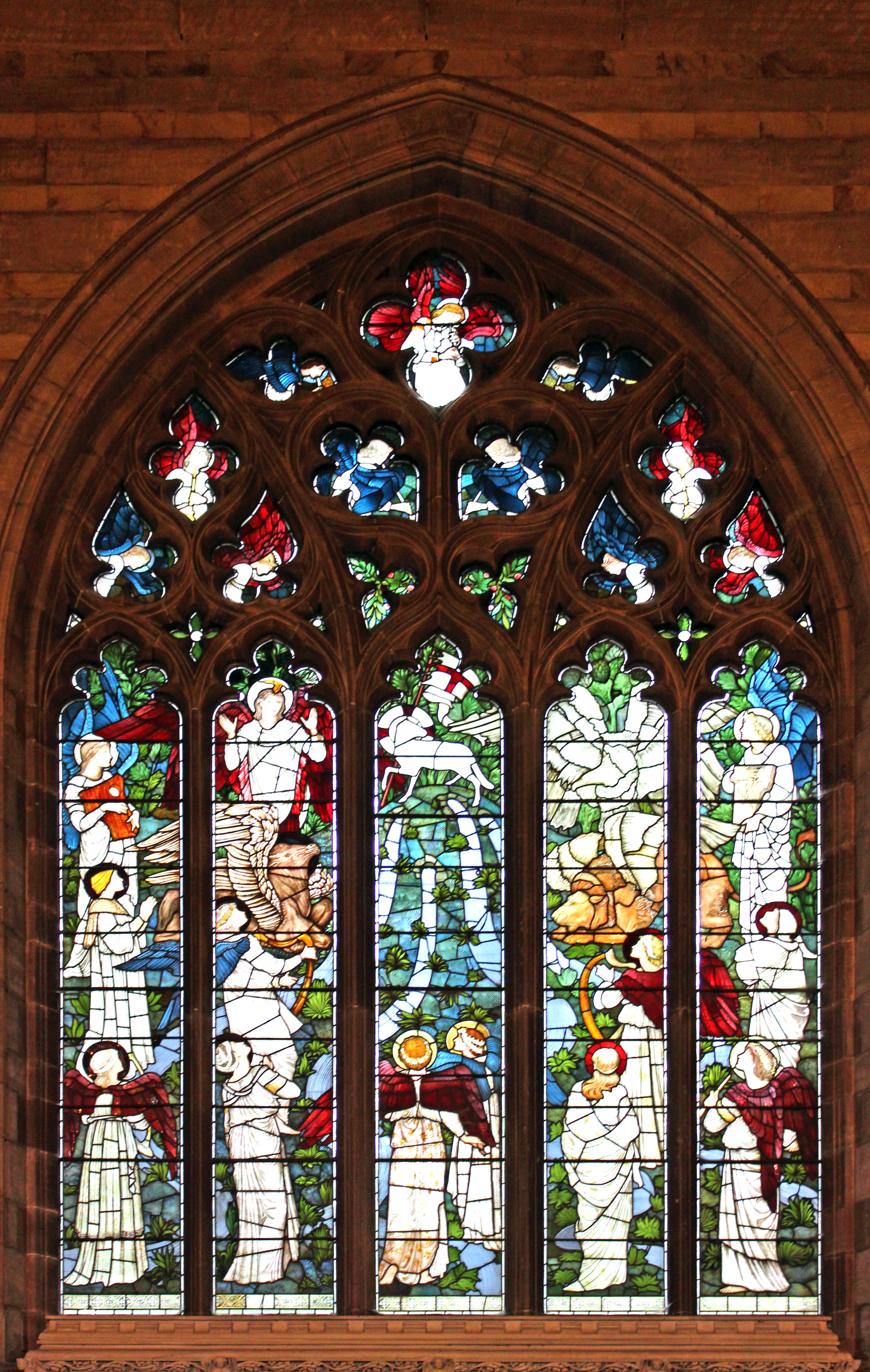
East window

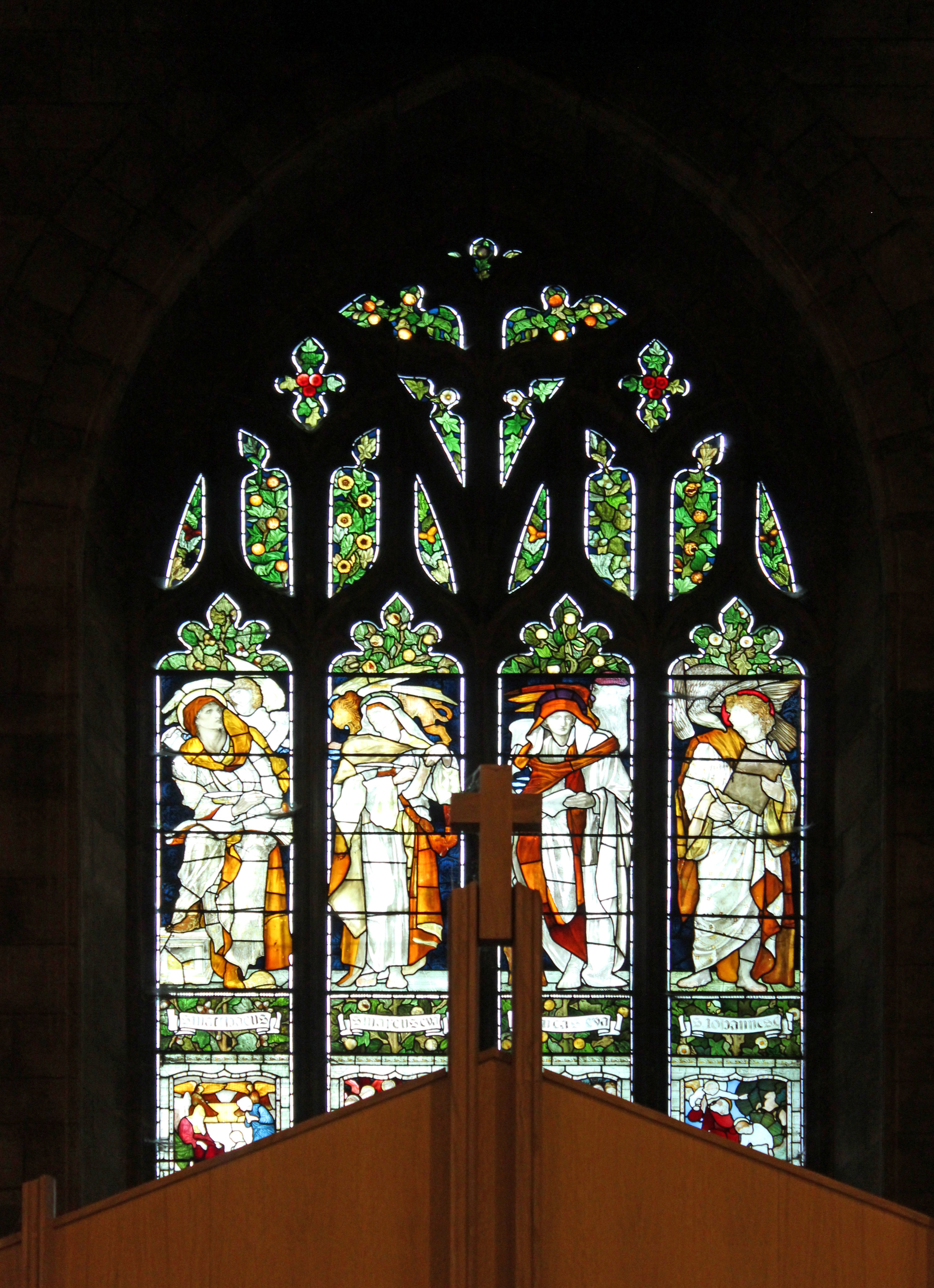
West window

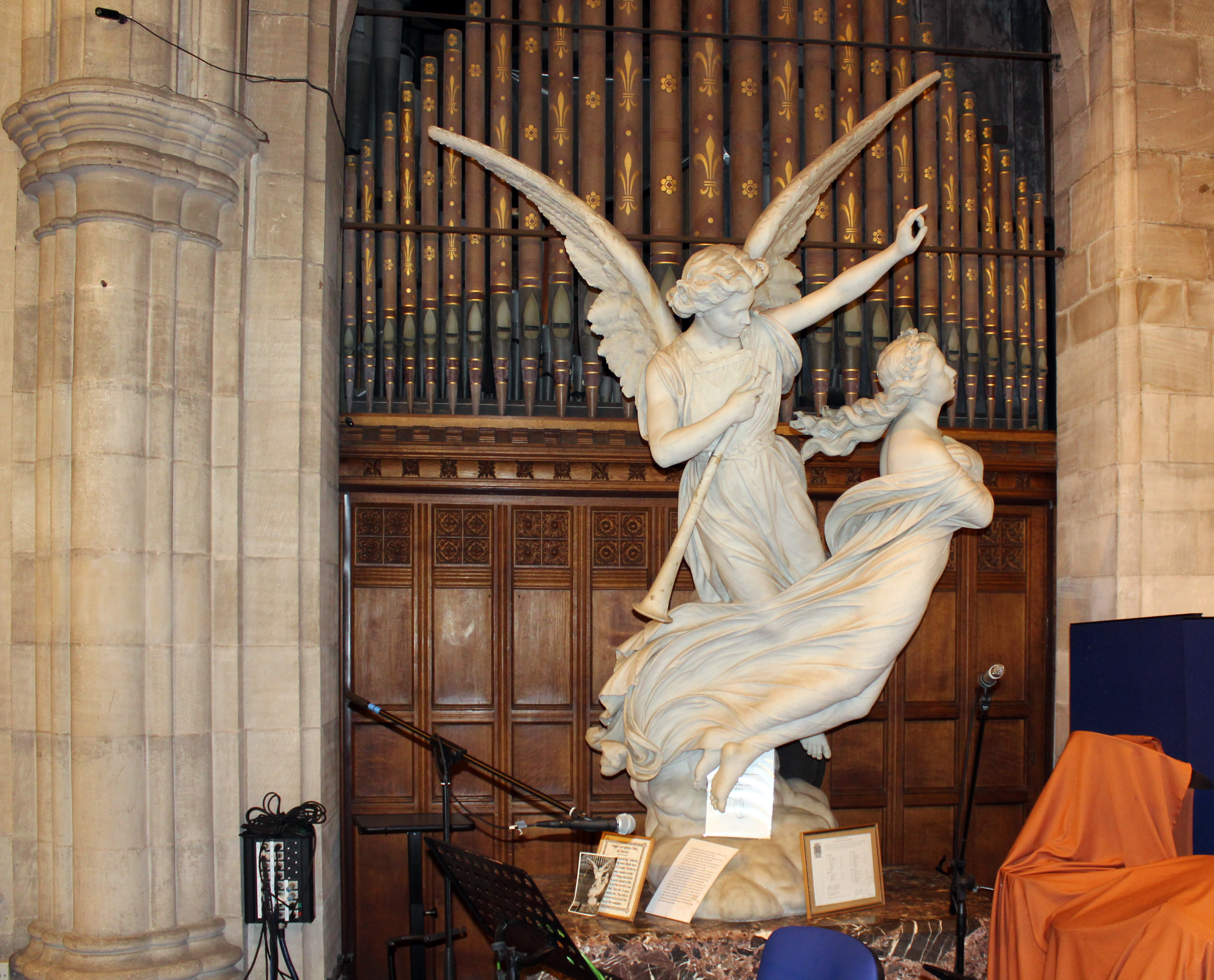
An Angel Carrying a Soul to Heaven by Fabiani

== See also ==
- Grade I listed buildings in Merseyside
- Grade I listed churches in Merseyside
- List of works by Grayson and Ould
