= Hill Bark =

Country house in Wirral, Merseyside, England

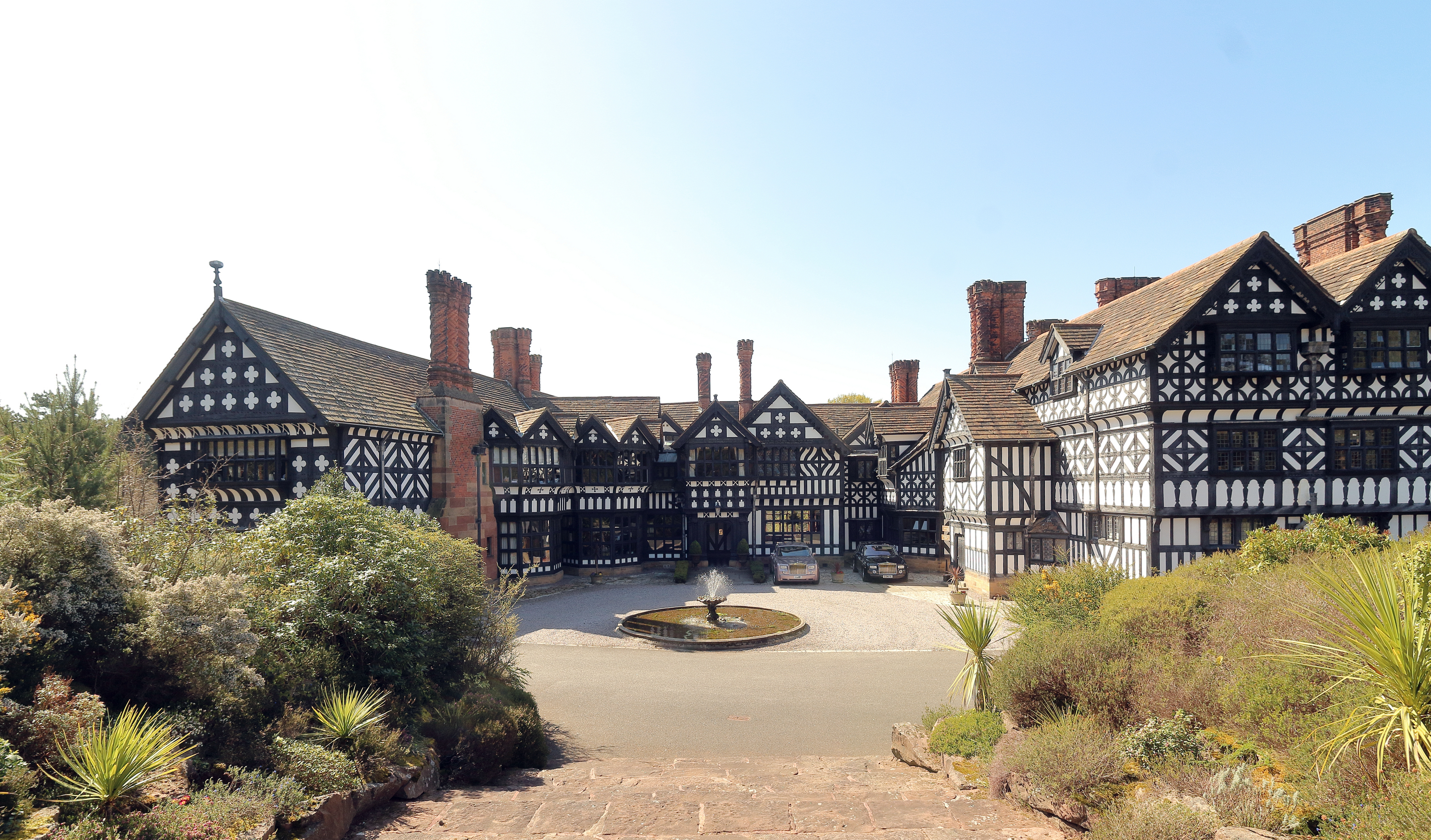
- Frontage of Hill Bark

- Location in Merseyside
- Alternative names: Bidston Court

General information
- Architectural style: Vernacular
- Location: Frankby, Wirral, Merseyside, England
- Coordinates: 53.3639°N 3.1346°W
- Year built: 1891
- Renovated: 1928–31 (rebuilt)
- Client: Robert William Hudson
- Owner: Hillbark Hotel

Design and construction
- Architects: Grayson & Ould
- Designations

Listed Building – Grade II*
- Official name: Hill Bark
- Designated: 5 June 1963
- Reference no.: 1242748

Renovating team
- Architects: Rees & Holt

Website
- hillbarkhotel.co.uk

Hill Bark (also known as Bidston Court) is a large country house to the south of the hamlet of Frankby, Wirral, Merseyside, England. It is recorded in the National Heritage List for England as a designated Grade II* listed building. The authors of the Buildings of England series comment that it is "one of the most notable Victorian essays in half-timbered design anywhere in the country".

== History ==
The house was originally built in 1891 for the soap manufacturer Robert William Hudson on Bidston Hill, Birkenhead. It was designed by the Liverpool architectural firm of George Enoch Grayson and Edward A. L. Ould (probably by Ould), and was then known as Bidston Court. It was the home of John Laird, Chairman of Laird Brothers Shipbuilders of Birkenhead (later Cammell Laird) until approximately 1910. In 1921 the house was later sold to Sir Ernest Royden, and he arranged for the house to be dismantled and rebuilt on the present site, at Royden Park, between 1928 and 1931. This work was supervised by the architectural firm of Rees and Holt. In 2001 the house was being used as an old people's home, and later in the 2000s it was converted into a hotel.

== Architecture ==
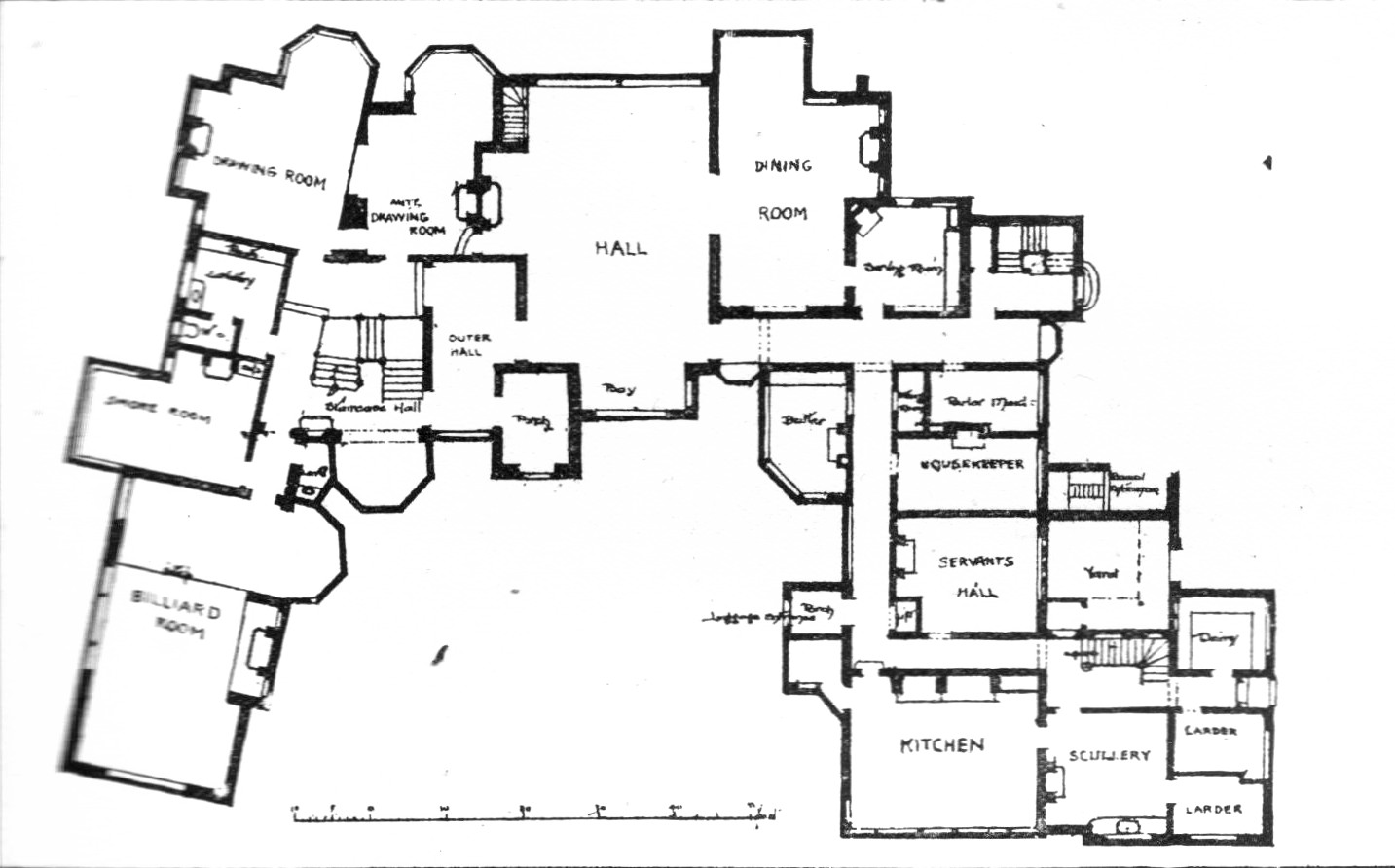
Floorplan, c. 1909

The house is built on a U-plan. It is constructed in timber framing on a stone base, and has stone and brick chimney stacks and a slate roof. There are multiple gables and the half-timber exterior framing is highly decorated. Internally there is a great hall with an organ gallery and an open roof. In the great hall are a mantlepiece dated 1527, from a house of the father of Sir Thomas More, stained glass windows by William Morris, and a pair of church screen doors dating from the 13th century. In a room now used as a restaurant is a fire surround dated 1795 and designed by Robert Adam.

It has been claimed that Bidston Court so impressed Crown Prince Wilhelm of Germany when visiting Cammell Laird shipyards, that he built a copy of it in Potsdam. However the authors of the Buildings of England series point out that this is untrue, and that the house in Potsdam was only vaguely inspired by Bidston Court.

== Present day ==
The house is now used as a hotel, known as Hillbark Hotel. It is licensed for weddings, and offers facilities for conferences. The hotel was used for the Juice FM Style Awards, which was filmed and featured in the reality television programme Desperate Scousewives on 29 November 2011 on E4.

The grounds adjoining the hotel are used by the Hillbark Players, who present traditional open-air Shakespeare plays every two years in a purpose-built 'theatre in the woods' with all seats under cover. The group take their name from Hill Bark House and have been performing here since 1964 (the 400th anniversary of Shakespeare's birth). Productions take place in June, in odd-numbered years.

== See also ==
- Grade II* listed buildings in Merseyside
- Listed buildings in Hoylake
- List of works by Grayson and Ould
