= List of works by Grayson and Ould =

Grayson and Ould was the title of an architectural practice based in Liverpool, Merseyside, England. George Enoch Grayson (1833/4–1912) (usually known as G. E. Grayson) established an independent practice in Liverpool in 1857. Edward Ould (1852–1909) trained with John Douglas in Chester. The partnership was formed in 1886; prior to this each designed buildings separately. After 1886 most of the works were designed together, with some exceptions shown in the list. Grayson's son, George Hastwell Grayson (1871–1951), joined the partnership in 1896.

In the list below, buildings designed by Grayson alone are denoted by † in the "Name" column, and Ould's designs by *.

== Key ==
Grade	Criteria
Grade I	Buildings of exceptional interest, sometimes considered to be internationally important.
Grade II*	Particularly important buildings of more than special interest.
Grade II	Buildings of national importance and special interest.

== Works ==
Name	Location	Photograph	Date	Notes	Grade
St Michael's; Church †	Hough Green, Widnes, Cheshire; 53.3712°N 2.7758°W		1870	Constructed in red sandstone with a bellcote between the nave and the chancel.	—
All Hallows Church †	Allerton, Liverpool; 53.3807°N 2.9035°W		1872–76	Designed for John Bibby, it is constructed in sandstone in Perpendicular style. Almost all the stained glass was made by Morris & Co. to designs by Edward Burne-Jones. The church includes a mausoleum for the Bibby family.	I
Main House, Irton Hall †	Irton with Santon, Cumbria; 54.3927°N 3.3804°W		1874	Grayson made alterations to an older house, including adding catellations, and changing the windows. The house was used later as a school.	II
Scottish Provident Building ↑	Castle Street, Liverpool; 53.4063°N 2.9906°W		1874		—
Mersey Chambers ↑	Old Church Yard, Liverpool; 53.4070°N 2.9933°W		c. 1878	Built as offices for Thomas and James Harrison, shipping agents. In Italianate style.	—
Scottish Equitable Chambers ↑	Castle Street, Liverpool; 53.4064°N 2.9907°W		c. 1878	In Neoclassical style with bands of polished granite.	—
5, 7, 9 and 11 Fairy Road *	Wrexham, Wales; 53.0399°N 2.9977°W		1876–1881	A single house, "Stafford House" (11), dated 1876, a single house (9) built c.1800 and a pair of semi-detached houses (5 and 7), with stepped gables and turrets dated 1881.	II
Bank of Liverpool †	Liverpool; 53.4076°N 2.9863°W		1881–82	Standing on the corner of Victoria Street and Sir Thomas Street, the bank is constructed in stone in Neoclassical style, with columns, pilasters, and a central pediment.	II
Queen's School *	Chester, Cheshire; 53.1910°N 2.8975°W		1881–83	Designed in an elaborate Vernacular Revival style, the school is constructed in brown brick with red terracotta and stone dressings, and a tiled roof. It has an L-plan and includes a hall, dining room and kitchen.	II
St Oswald's; Church †	Bidston, Merseyside; 53.4024°N 3.0671°W		1882	Extended the chancel.	II
Liverpool Savings Bank †	Scotland Road, Liverpool; 53.4226°N 2.9818°W		1882	A branch of the bank, sited on a corner with a round tower.	—
Granite Buildings †	6–20 Stanley Street, Liverpool; 53.4075°N 2.9878°W		c. 1882	Offices constructed entirely in granite.	II
Rectory *	Handley, Cheshire; 53.1159°N 2.7992°W		1884	In brick and red stone.	—
Uffington House *	Chester, Cheshire; 53.1915°N 2.8777°W		1885	A house built for Thomas Hughes. A tall brick house with brick and terracotta dressings. It has three storeys with corner turrets.	II
Old Rectory *	Halkyn, Flintshire, Wales; 53.2363°N 3.1891°W		1885	Built at the expense of the Duke of Westminster. The ground floor is stone-faced, the upper storey has tile-hanging in the style of Norman Shaw.	II
Church House †	Hanover Street, Liverpool; 53.4028°N 2.9857°W		1885	Designed partly for the Mersey Mission to Seamen, including a chapel and meeting rooms, and partly as a temperance hotel on the corner of Hanover Street and Paradise Street. It is in red and yellow brick with a tiled roof, in three storeys and an attic.	II
Union Bank of Liverpool †	43–47 Bold Street, Liverpool; 53.4033°N 2.9785°W		1885	Originally a central doorway led into the banking hall; later the frontage is all occupied by shops, the central one under a pediment.	II
Oakfield Manor *	Upton-by-Chester, Cheshire; 53.2252°N 2.8792°W		c. 1885	Built as a house, later partly rebuilt. In red brick with blue brick diapering and a slate roof. Later used as offices and a restaurant for Chester Zoo.	II
Hamilton Square Station †	Birkenhead, Merseyside; 53.3947°N 3.0138°W		1886	A station building for the Mersey Railway in brick and terracotta and in Italianate style. It incorporates a hydraulic tower.	II
8 and 10 Lower Bridge Street *	Chester, Cheshire; 53.1882°N 2.8910°W		1886	A shop with accommodation in brick and timber framing with plaster panels.	II
St Peter's Church	Woolton, Liverpool; 53.3760°N 2.8694°W		1886–87	A new church replacing an older one; in Gothic Revival style. with a southeast tower.	II*
Lychgate, St Peter's Church	Woolton, Liverpool; 53.3760°N 2.8689°W		c. 1886–87	Large and ornate, consisting of a timber-framed canopy on stone side walls, surmounted by a cross.	II
Wightwick Manor *	Wightwick, West Midlands; 52.5836°N 2.1942°W		1887	A house in Vernacular Revival style for Theodore Mander. Extended in 1893. It is constructed in brick with stone dressings and timber framing with tiled roofs. Now owned by the National Trust.	I
Queen Insurance Building	Castle Street, Liverpool; 53.4065°N 2.9908°W		1887–88	With decoration in terracotta.	—
British and Foreign Marine Insurance Company	3–5 Castle Street, Liverpool; 53.4068°N 2.9910°W		1888–89	An office building in red brick, red sandstone and terracotta. It is in five storeys with attics, and has five bays.	II
British and Foreign Marine Insurance Company	Castle Street, Liverpool; 53.4066°N 2.9909°W		1888–90	In red brick with red sandstone and terracotta dressings. Above the first floor is a mosaic with scenes of shipping.	—
Latham Building, Trinity Hall	Cambridge; 52.2060°N 0.1149°E		1890	Constructed in red brick with stone dressings, it has four storeys, and is in seven bays. The architectural style is Elizabethan.	II
Midland Bank	The Cross, Oswestry, Shropshire; 52.8590°N 3.0558°W		1890	Built in red brick, stone, and terracotta, with gables and oriel windows.	—
Rectory and Hall, St Mary's Church	Handbridge, Chester, Cheshire; 53.1829°N 2.8901°W		c. 1890	A two-storey rectory with an attic, in red brick with pargeting. The right wing was originally the church hall.	II
Houses	Thornton Hough, Merseyside; 53.3196°N 3.0443°W		1890s	Village houses built for Lord Leverhulme.	II
Houses *	Wightwick, West Midlands; 52.5832°N 2.1914°W		1890s	Houses built for Theodore Mander for the Wightwick Manor estate.	II
South Wing, Trinity Hall	Cambridge; 52.2056°N 0.1158°E		1890–92	Wing altered and re-fronted.	I
Hill Bark	Frankby, Merseyside; 53.3632°N 3.1379°W		1891	Built for the soap manufacturer Robert William Hudson on a different site, and then known as Bidston Court. Moved to Frankby in 1929–31, and used later as a hotel.	II*
The Mount *	Tettenhall Wood, West Midlands; 52.5879°N 2.1862°W		1891	Enlarged and altered by Ould for Charles Tertius Mander, first baronet; further alterations with addition of large Library and Music Room in 1908. A house in brick with stone dressings and a tile roof. It has an L-plan, and is in Arts and Crafts style. Later used as a hotel (alterations).	II
Bidston Court Lodge	Bidston, Merseyside; 53.3925°N 3.0764°W		c. 1891	A building in rendered brick with pargeted panels. Bidston Court has been moved to a different site and renamed Hill Bark.	II
Quaker Meeting House †	Birkenhead, Merseyside		1892		—
Victoria Chambers	42 Castle Street, Liverpool; 53.4063°N 2.9912°W		1893	Offices in Renaissance style, incorporating sculptures of mermen.	—
Hesketh Grange	Thornton Hough, Merseyside; 53.3231°N 3.0493°W		1894	Built for the father and sisters of Lord Leverhulme. It has an L-plan and is in two storeys, built in stone with a stone slate roof.	II
Lodge and stables, Hesketh Grange	Thornton Hough, Merseyside; 53.3237°N 3.0487°W		1894	The lodge is in stone with a timber-framed first floor and a Dutch gable. Behind it is a single-storey, four-bay stable range.	II
Leyland and Bullen's Bank	36 Castle Street, Liverpool; 53.4062°N 2.9911°W		1895	Later the Bank of Scotland, on the corner of Brunswick Street. On its corner is a turret surmounted by a dome.	II
Thornton House	Thornton Hough, Merseyside; 53.3206°N 3.0425°W		1895	Built for James Darcy Lever. A mixture of stone and half-timbering. Later divided into separate residential units.	II
North Lodge, Thornton House	Thornton Hough, Merseyside; 53.3222°N 3.0430°W		1895	Built for James Darcy Lever. A timber-framed lodge in one storey with an attic in three bays.	II
South Lodge, Thornton House	Thornton Hough, Merseyside; 53.3214°N 3.0440°W		1895	Built for James Darcy Lever. A timber-framed lodge in one storey with an attic and a Dutch gable.	II
Stables, Thornton House	Thornton Hough, Merseyside; 53.3212°N 3.0436°W		1895	Built for James Darcy Lever, later converted for residential use. A single-storey five-bay range, with a single-bay return range at each end.	II
Chester Hospital	Chester, Cheshire; 53.2095°N 2.8972°W		1895–98	A complete 404-bed hospital, replacing an earlier hospital on the same site. It had an E-plan with a pedimented centre. Now replaced by the Countess of Chester Hospital.	—
Houses and terraces	Port Sunlight, Merseyside; 53.351°N 2.999°W		1895–1907	Workers' accommodation built for Lord Leverhulme.	II
Lever Club	Port Sunlight, Merseyside; 53.3491°N 2.9980°W		1896	Built as a men's social club in brick with stone dressings and a timber-framed jettied upper storey.	II
7 Water Street	Liverpool; 53.4066°N 3.9921°W		c. 1896	On the corner of Fenwick Street; the range on Water Street has been demolished and replaced. The Fenwick Street range is in granite.	—
St Faith's Church	Waterloo, Sefton, Merseyside; 53.4811°N 3.0227°W		1898–1900	A large church in red brick with red sandstone dressings, and green slate roofs. It has an octagonal southeast turret with a pointed roof.	II
North range, Westcott House	Cambridge; 52.2084°N 0.1226°E		1899	The earliest part of the college, in red brick with stone dressings, incorporating a central gatehouse.	II
Bridge Inn	Port Sunlight, Merseyside; 53.3527°N 2.9950°W		1900	A public house with a U-plan, the wings having jettied gables, decorated bargeboards and bow windows.	II
Hall i' th' Wood *	Bolton, Greater Manchester; 53.6005°N 2.4190°W		c. 1900	A former manor house restored by Ould with Jonathan Simpson for Lord Leverhulme. It was then donated to Bolton Corporation and has been used as a museum. The building is partly timber-framed and partly in stone.	I
Council Offices	Chirk, Wrexham, Wales; 52.9347°N 3.0569°W		1902	Built in red sandstone with a red tiled roof in Jacobean Revival style.	II
Church Drive Primary School	Port Sunlight, Merseyside; 53.3547°N 2.9961°W		1902–03	Built in brick with a tiled roof, mainly in one storey, including a tower with a turret, cupola and weathervane.	II
Consumption Hospital	Mount Pleasant, Liverpool; 53.4037°N 2.9731°W		1903–04	In red brick and terracotta, with a central pediment.	—
Thornton Manor	Thornton Hough, Merseyside; 53.3276°N 3.0517°W		1904	Added a kitchen and a service wing for Lord Leverhulme.	II*
Liberal Club	Thornton Hough, Merseyside; 53.3209°N 3.0450°W		c. 1904	Built as a Liberal Club, later used as a Post Office and village club. It is timber-framed on a stone base, with a U-shaped plan. The wings have jettied first storeys with quatrefoil panels.	II
Inverforth House	Camden, Greater London; 51.5649°N 0.1810°W		c. 1905	Alterations for Lord Leverhulme, including rebuilding the central block, and adding north and south wings and terrace to the garden front.	II
Barclays Bank	Old Swan, Liverpool; 53.4138°N 2.9138°W		c. 1905	On a corner site with an L-plan. Constructed in red brick with stone dressings, it has a canted entrance on the corner rising to a turret with a cupola. On each side are wings with Dutch gables.	II
Bank of Liverpool	33 High Street, Wrexham, Wales; 53.0450°N 2.9923°W		c. 1906–12	Later Martin's Bank; in red ashlar stone, elaborately decorated, with a tetrastyle Corinthian portico. Cadw describes the exterior as "white ashlar to ground floor, red sandstone above".	II
Dining Hall, Selwyn College	Cambridge; 52.2007°N 0.1062°E		1909	In the style of the 17th century with a Jacobean entrance. It is in two storeys with the main hall at the upper level.	II
