= The North and South Wales Bank =

Former bank in England and Wales

North and South Wales Bank
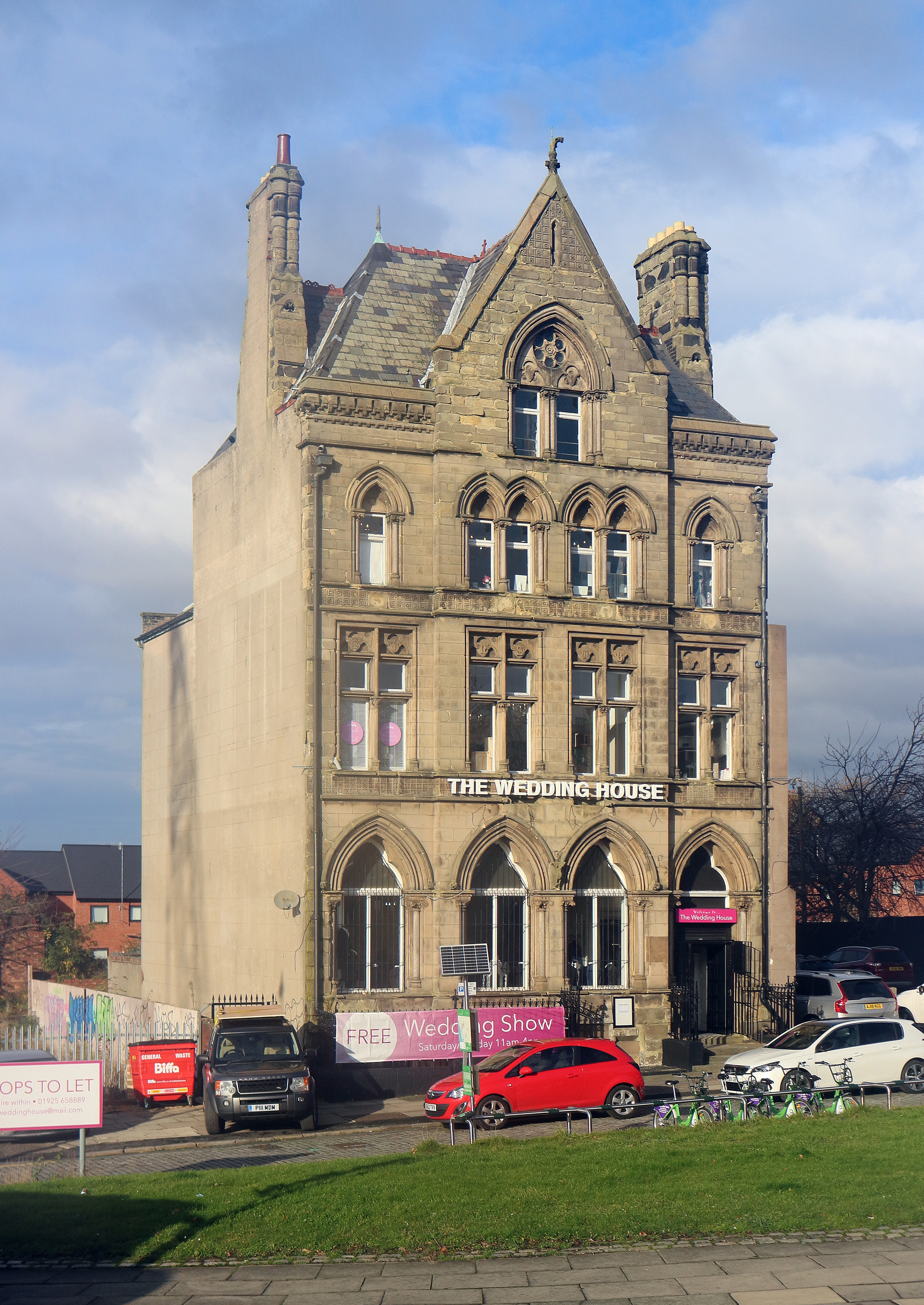
- A view of this former bank in 2019
- Type: Private company
- Traded as: North and South Wales Bank; Bank Wales
- Industry: Banking
- Founded: 1 October 1810; 215 years ago in Liverpool, United Kingdom
- Founder: Sir Love Parry Price Parry, Ambrose Lace and John Dean Case
- Defunct: 10 August 1836; 190 years ago
- Fate: Merger
- Successor: Midland Bank and HSBC
- Headquarters: Liverpool
- Area served: Wales and England
- Key people: Sir Love Parry Price Parry, Ambrose Lace and John Dean Case
- Products: lending, deposits
- Services: financial services
- Revenue: unknown
- Operating income: unknown
- Net income: unknown
- Total assets: 84 branches and 24 sub-branches, deposits of £11 million
- Total equity: unknown
- Owner: Sir Love Parry Price Parry, Ambrose Lace and John Dean Case as trustees for investors
- Number of employees: unknown
- Parent: not applicable
- Divisions: none
- Website: HSBC our history

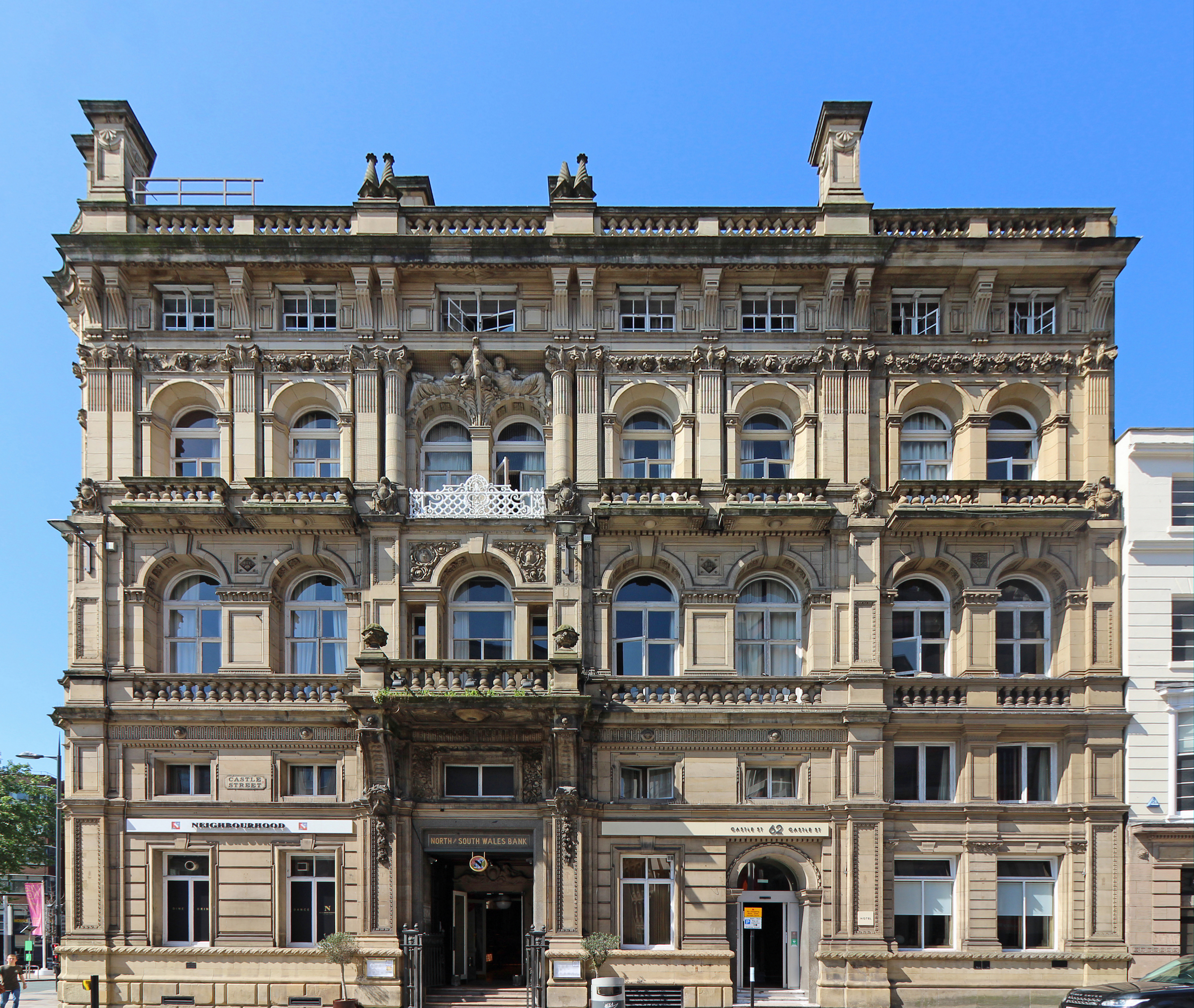
60 & 62 Castle Street in 2018

The North and South Wales Bank (also known as the Wales Bank) was formed in Liverpool in 1836 and was originally located in premises in James Street, Liverpool.

== Shares prospectus ==
A prospectus was issued offering shares of £20, with £10 paid up, and calling attention to the needs of:

“extensive and important mining, manufacturing and agricultural districts comprised within the proposed sphere of operations"

The prospectus went on to state that:

"proprietors of collieries, mining and smelting works are reduced to the necessity of doing most of their banking business out of the district, and in some instances, of submitting to the inconvenience of being their own bankers!”

== Vision ==
The bank envisaged a branch system that would extend throughout Wales, despite the challenges concerning transport and communication, as there were no railways in Wales at this time.

== Provisional committee and deputations ==
A provisional committee of Liverpool merchants, manufacturers and businessmen appointed a deputation to visit Welsh towns and London for interviews with leaders of the nobility and gentry of Wales and the Welsh Members of Parliament.

These deputations were equipped with "a phaeton and a good strong horse" and were sent throughout Wales with:

"full powers to treat with any bank or bankers for the purchase of the business of their establishments and also for the appointment of any clerk or clerks they may think fit"

the deputations were also to:

"proceed to such places as they may think proper with a view to open banks”

== First trustees ==
Sir Love Parry Price Parry, Ambrose Lace and John Dean Case were appointed trustees of the bank.

Applications for shares exceeded the proposed allotment and the capital structure was altered to £600,000 in £10 shares with £7 10s paid up.

== Establishment of branches in Wales ==
Upon formation the bank commenced taking over a number of private banks. In addition the bank started to establish branches in several towns in North Wales. In order to expand into South Wales a deputation was sent there to assess the potential for new branches.

In the first year of operations the bank had established 13 branches and 10 sub-branches, the furthest one being 100 miles from Liverpool.

The collapse of the Northern & Central Bank of England, a Manchester bank with 40 branches – many in North Wales – led to eight of these branches being taken over by the bank.

The branches at Bishop's Castle, Newtown, Powys and Welshpool were all opened on 30 May 1836. The branches at Llanfyllin and Oswestry were opened on 8 June 1836. The branch at Ruthin was opened on 27 June 1836. The branch at Llanrwst was opened on 1 July 1836. The branches at Caernarfon and Chester were opened on 4 July 1836. The branch at Mold, Flintshire was opened on 9 August 1836 and the branch at Wrexham was opened on 19 September 1836. These eleven branches became part of Midland Bank from 1908, helping to establish their branch network in Wales.

The bank took over an Aberystwyth bank called Bank y Llong on 15 August 1836 and had a branch at New Street, Aberystwyth from about 1864 to 1885, the bank then moved to a building on the south side of Great Darkgate Street and thereafter planned to move to a new building across the street, but while the new branch was under construction the takeover by Midland Bank occurred.

The Wrexham branch was housed in the building where 43 High Street now stands and in 1861 it moved to 29 High Street. The branch at 14 High Street was opened in 1905, and became a Wetherspoons public house in 1999. It was built by Woolfall and Eccles. The facade, of yellow sandstone with polished granite columns, is in a 'baroque palazzo' style.

The branch in Rhyl operated from February 1856 from old Bodfor House on the corner of Bodfor Street and Wellington Road. In 1880 the bank moved to premises in the Town Hall where they employed 10 clerks and it remained here until completion of a new building in 1900 made from locally quarried Talacre stone and Ruabon red bricks.

The Llangollen branch was established in 1864. The elegant bank premises were built by Morris Roberts, who was responsible for several buildings in the town including the Town Hall and the National School. This bank was closed on 7 February 2014.

In Chester the branch was known as the Grosvenor Club and North and South Wales Bank.

== Establishment of branches in Merseyside ==
The bank became a leading bank in the Merseyside region and from the 1860s onwards it established 'town branches' and extended into new suburbs and into the Metropolitan Borough of Wirral.

The town branches had many industrial, trading and shipping customers which balanced the agricultural business of the branches in North Wales, Cheshire and Shropshire.

In November 1908, the bank had a total of 84 branches and 24 sub-branches.

== Further development in Liverpool ==
The strong commercial connection between Liverpool and Wales, and the strength of Liverpool as a commercial centre meant that the bank remained permanently headquartered in Liverpool at the following locations:

- from establishment to 1873: James Street;
- from 1873 onwards : 62 Castle St (until the 1908 merger)
- 1908 to 1980s: 62 Castle Street (as a branch of Midland Bank);
- 1980s onwards: Dale Street (after merger of the two branches, the Dale Street branch previously having been a branch of another Liverpool bank).

In 1901 the Liverpool base was further strengthened when the bank acquired Leyland and Bullins, a banking firm with strong shipping and cotton trade connections which had been founded in 1807.

== Reputation ==
Under the management of George Rae (banker) the selection and training of staff and the efficiency of book-keeping systems were given high priority in comparison with other country banks.

The large number of managers and clerks using the Welsh language was particularly distinctive. Graduates of the bank included (in addition to Rae) distinguished bankers such as R Meredith Jones, Liverpool manager between 1868 and 1894, and Rowland Hughes, general manager between 1897 and 1908 and the bank owed much of its reputation to the quality of its staff and its methods.

== Merger ==
In November 1908 the bank merged with Midland Bank. The merger was initiated by Sir Edward Holden, 1st Baronet who was the chairman of Midland Bank and its managing director (chief executive officer). He was a leading figure in bank mergers of the period.

Although the bank had been profitable between 1868 and 1895, with dividends of 17'/2%, the business subsequently declined. In particular, the business cycle of the cotton industry and the Panic of 1907 led to a decision to merge with Midland Bank. At the time of the merger the bank’s paid-in capital was £750,000, bank reserves were £512,000, deposits were £11 million and advance payments and bills (negotiable instrument) were £7'/2 millions.

After the merger the branches and staff of the bank became part of the much larger Midland network.

== Bank notes ==
In the 19th century, most private banks issued their own bank notes. The Bank Charter Act 1844 restricted this practice and only banks that issued notes before the implementation of the Act could do so and would lose the right on merger or takeover. The last Welsh bank notes were withdrawn from circulation in 1908 by the North and South Wales Bank, when it was taken over by the Midland Bank. After that Wales could only use notes issued by the Bank of England.

Only six banks still retain the rights to print their own notes, all of which are in Scotland and Northern Ireland. Lenders that print these notes must hold assets that are equivalent to the amount of notes they have in circulation.

Plaid Cymru has said that Wales should be given back the powers to create its own bank notes, in order to give the nation equal status with Scotland and Northern Ireland. Jonathan Edwards, the party’s Treasury spokesman, said that Wales had been:

“denied an opportunity to be treated as an equal nation within the UK”.

He said that the issuance of Welsh banknotes “would put us on equal footing with the other nations”. The proposal would see a new private bank granted the power to issue its own notes for the first time in more than 170 years. Speaking to the Financial Times, he said:

“The issuing of Welsh bank notes, I believe, would come as a much welcomed boost to Wales’ national character, her recognition as an equal nation and as an economic entity”
