= The Midland, Wrexham =

Pub in Wrexham, Wales; formerly a bank

The Midland
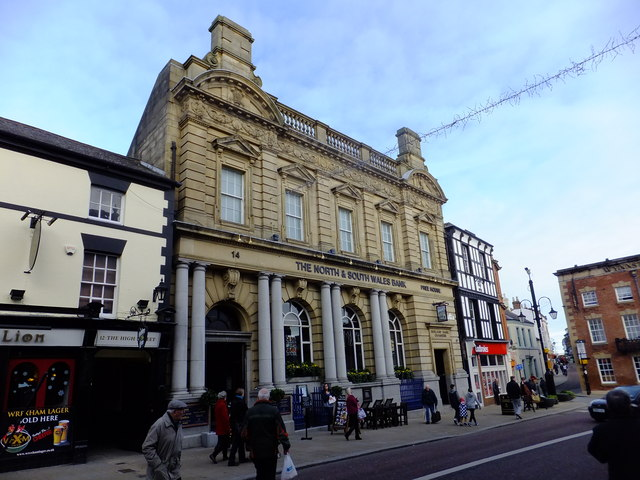
- The building on Wrexham's High Street, as The North & South Wales Bank
- Interactive map of the The Midland area
- Former names: Midland Bank; Lloyds (No. 1 Bar); The North & South Wales Bank

General information
- Type: Pub; Former bank
- Architectural style: Baroque palazzo
- Location: 14 High Street, Rhosddu, Wrexham, Wales LL13 8HP
- Coordinates: 53.045232°N 2.991865°W
- Construction started: 1910
- Construction stopped: 1912
- Client: The North and South Wales Bank (1905–1908); Midland Bank (1908–1999); Wetherspoons (2001–2023)
- Owner: Ansloos Leisure Ltd (2023–)

Technical details
- Floor count: 2
- Floor area: 8,696 square feet (807.9 m^{2})

Design and construction
- Architecture firm: Woolfall and Eccles

Website
- midlandwrexham.com

Listed Building – Grade II
- Official name: Midland Bank
- Designated: 31 January 1994
- Reference no.: 1842

The Midland is a pub housed in a historic former bank building in Wrexham city centre, Wales. Located at the eastern end of Wrexham's High Street, it opened in 1912 as the Midland Bank, which purchased the original client The North and South Wales Bank a few years prior to construction. The building is a Grade II listed building.

The building housed a Wetherspoons pub initially known as Lloyds, and later The North and South Wales Bank from 2001 to 2023. It re-opened as a pub in late 2023, as The Midland, recognising the building's original name and purpose.

== History ==
The North and South Wales Bank first established its presence in the town in 1836, with its Wrexham office opening on 19 September 1836, on the site where 43 High Street now stands, in the house of a Mr Griffith in the Market Place. The office later moved in 1861 to the ground floor of 29 High Street (now opposite the present-day building), then owned by the Alliance Assurance Company.

The Lion House hotel, on the site the current building is now situated on, to the eastern end of the High Street, was bought in 1905 for The North and South Wales Bank of Liverpool from S.R. Johnson. Although before the building was completed The North and South Wales Bank was purchased by the Midland Bank (now part of HSBC) in 1908. With the building opening as the "Midland Bank" instead of "The North and South Wales Bank" which was dropped.

Construction of the building took place between 1910 and 1912, by Woolfall and Eccles, the architects for the Midland Bank. Woolfall and Eccles originally envisioned the building to be in the Gothic style, to match nearby St Giles' Church, but the designs were rejected by the London City and Midland Bank when they took over the construction as they preferred a renaissance façade which was associated with their branches.

The building has a yellow sandstone façade with ashlar, polished lower storey granite columns, a slate roof, and the building was in a "baroque palazzo" style. It has two storeys and a five window range.

=== Pub ===
==== Wetherspoons (2001–2023) ====
The building operated as a bank until 1999. In 2001, it opened as a Wetherspoons pub, the second pub in the town. The pub was originally named "Lloyds", but was later renamed to "The North & South Wales Bank" in recognition of its former use. On 29 July 2021, Wetherspoons announced the pub was one of the few pubs put up for sale and the only one in Wales. On 26 November 2021, plaster from the building's ceiling collapsed following Storm Arwen. Two people claimed to police that they were injured. Wetherspoons later claimed the two individuals were "pretending", citing CCTV footage showing no one was harmed and the two claimants later left the premises before paramedics arrived. It stopped operating as a pub on 15 January 2023, and was followed by the completed sale of the building on 18 January 2023.

==== The Midland (2023–) ====
On 3 August 2023, it was announced the building was purchased by Sam Ansloos and Marcus Ansloos, who operate local clubs in the area. The pub underwent renovation, with a "sports bar" design, and re-opened on 2 December 2023 as The Midland. This name references the original name and purpose of the building as the Midland Bank.

A safe deposit box is still present on the exterior of the building. The building is Grade II listed building.

== See also ==
- Wynnstay Arms Hotel, Wrexham
