= Royden Park =

Public park in Frankby, Wirral, England

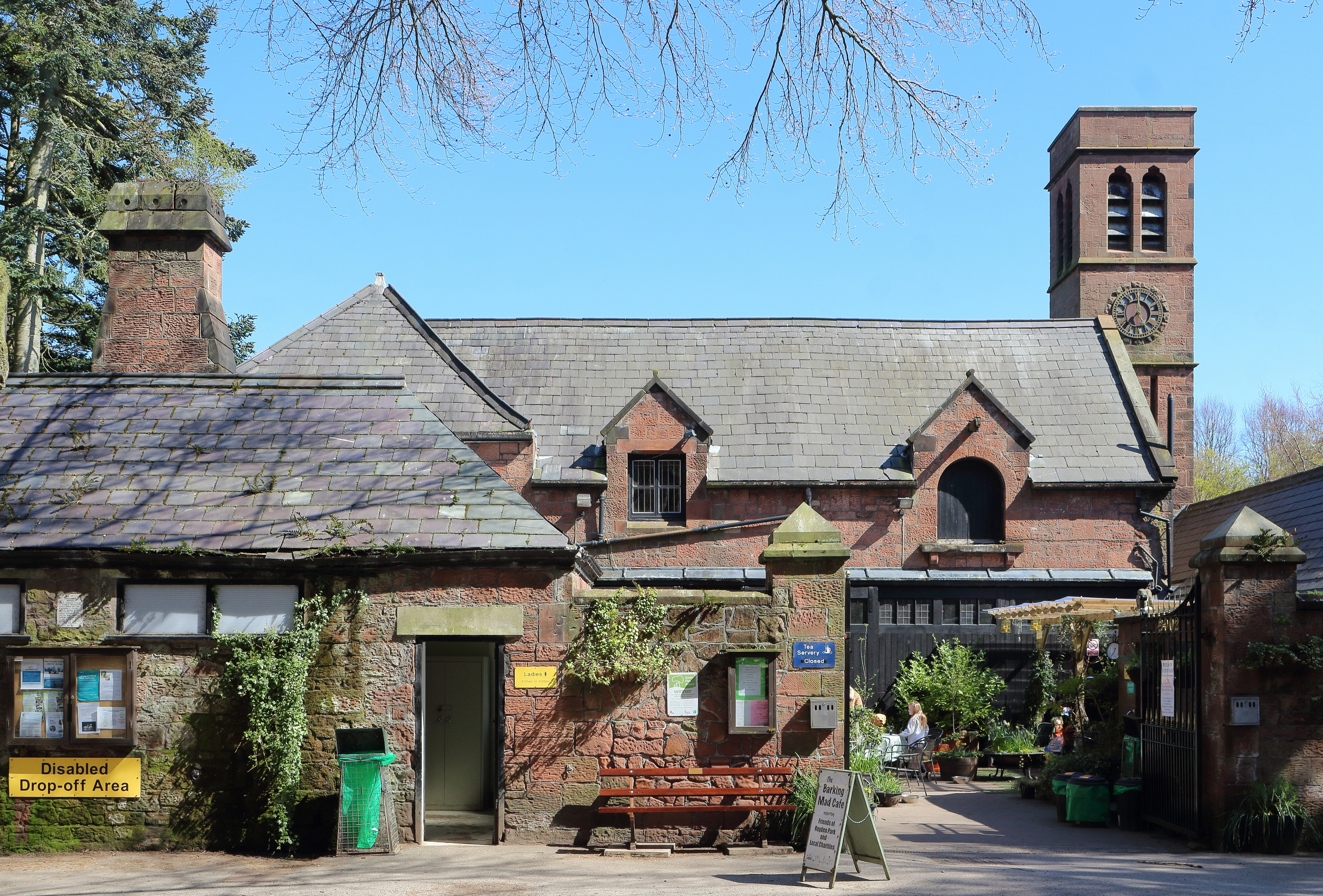
- Coach House at Royden Park, its visitor centre
- Interactive map of Royden Park
- Type: Park
- Location: Frankby, Wirral, England
- Coordinates: 53°21′50″N 03°08′00″W
- Area: 36.99 hectares (91.4 acres)
- Operator: Wirral Council
- Status: Open all year

Royden Park is a park in Frankby, Wirral, England, managed by Wirral Council. The grounds of the park were originally part of an estate owned by Ernest Royden which comprised the park, Hill Bark house and Thurstaston Common. Upon his death the estate passed to Hoylake council and was opened to the public for recreation. The park features a visitor centre, walled garden, miniature railway, woodland walks and a lake.

== History ==
In the 1820s the land on which the park now sits was heath and woodland. During the 1860s a house called Hillbark was built on the estate and the area was planted and landscaped. In the 1870s a coach house and walled garden were added. In 1928 the estate was passed to Ernest Royden who demolished the earlier residence and moved his own house brick by brick to the site. This house is now known as Hill Bark. After the death of Royden in 1960, the estate including Hill Bark, Thurstaston Common and Royden Park was sold to Hoylake Urban District Council. Royden Park and Thurstaston Common were opened for public recreation. Hill Bark became an old people's home and is now a privately owned hotel and wedding venue. Following local government re-organisation in 1974 Wirral Council now manage the park and common.

== Features ==
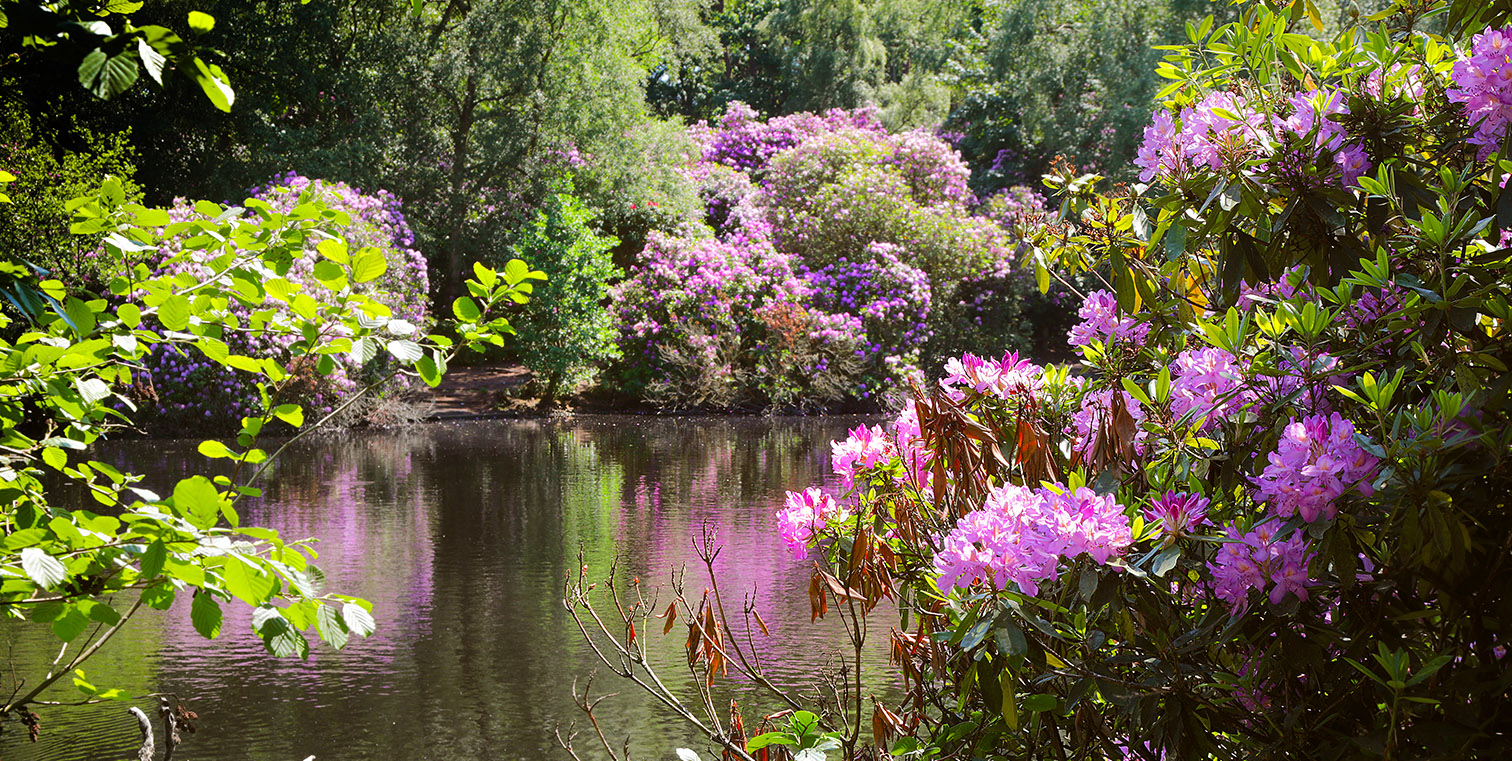
Roodee mere

The park features a large lake called Roodee Mere where fishing is allowed with a permit. A miniature railway takes passengers around the grounds every Sunday afternoon weather permitting. The old coach house for Hill Bark has been converted for use as a cafe and resource centre. There are conifer woodland walks, meadows with nature walks, car parking, a walled garden and family events.

== Nature ==
The park and commons are managed as a local nature reserve offering a range of habitats for plants, insects, flowers and wildlife.

== Walled garden ==
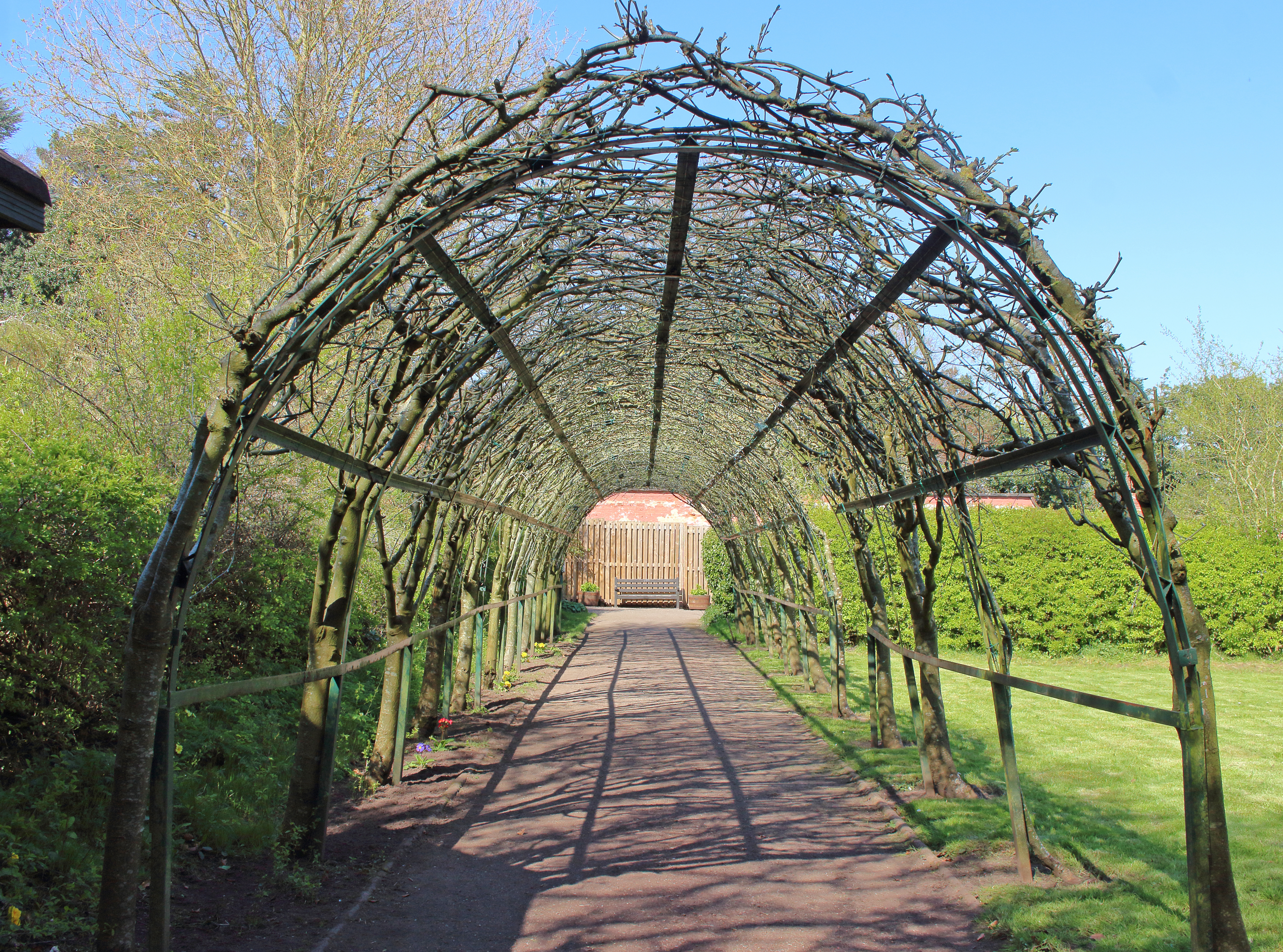
The Laburnum arch

The park has a walled garden which was built in 1870 as the kitchen garden for Hill Bark house and is a fine example of Victorian architecture. The garden is used as a community resource. A laburnum arch was added by the Wirral Model Engineering Society who operate the miniature railway. Contained within the walls are a herb garden, a bog garden, a flower garden and a traditional cottage garden that originally grew plants for medicinal purposes.

== Miniature railways ==
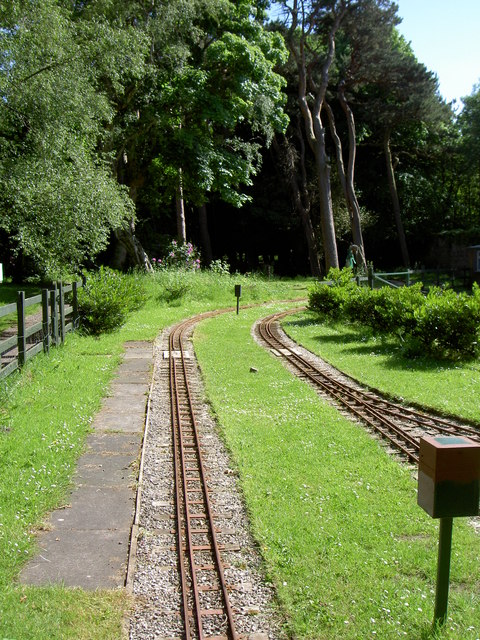
The miniature railway

Wirral Model Engineers Society operate two miniature railways at the park. The society came into existence in 1961 and they have been developing the railway track and facilities ever since. The first railway is a combined 2½, 3½ and 5½ inch gauge raised track for detailed scale models of full size steam locomotives; this track was extended in 1980 to 1,200 feet. The second railway is a 7¼ inch gauge ridable miniature railway pulled by a traction locomotive; this track was extended to 2,267 feet in 2004.
