= Thurstaston Common =

- Site of Special Scientific Interest
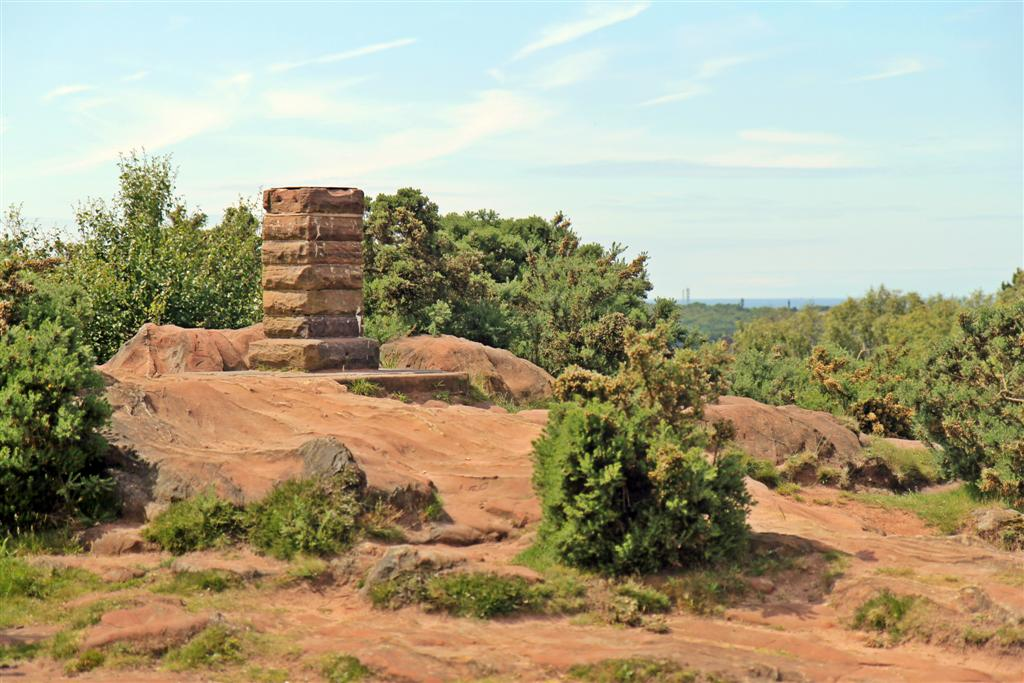

- Location within Merseyside
- Location of Thurstaston Common.
- Area of search: Merseyside
- Grid reference: SJ245851
- Coordinates: 53.355°N 3.135°W
- Interest: Biological and Geological
- Area: 70.8 ha (175 acres)
- Notification date: 1954 / 1983

Thurstaston Common is an area of almost 250 acres (100 ha) of parklands, wood and heath between Frankby and Thurstaston, on the Wirral Peninsula in North West England. The common is jointly owned by the National Trust and the Metropolitan Borough of Wirral. Royden Country Park is nearby and offers additional facilities.

The Common is a Site of Special Scientific Interest (SSSI) and a local nature reserve. From the top of the 298 ft (91 m) Thurstaston Hill there are views of the Dee Estuary (itself an SSSI) and across to the Clwydian Hills of North Wales. The area is popular with walkers and families.

== SSSI ==
The common is underlain by Triassic sandstone and the varied habitats include wet and dry heaths, acidic marshy grassland and deciduous woodland with birch and oak. The heath is dominated by heather, with bilberry, wavy hair-grass, gorse, heath grass, tormentil, hairy sedge, pill sedge and heath bedstraw, with cross-leaved heath and purple moor-grass; in the wet, peaty hollows are heath rush, common cottongrass and hare's-tail cottongrass, deer grass, Sphagnum compactum, bog asphodel and bulbous rush. Also present in wet patches are oblong-leaved sundew and round-leaved sundew. Birds that breed here include sparrowhawk, tawny owl, great spotted woodpecker, lesser spotted woodpecker, Eurasian jay, redpoll and linnet.

== "Thor's Stone" ==
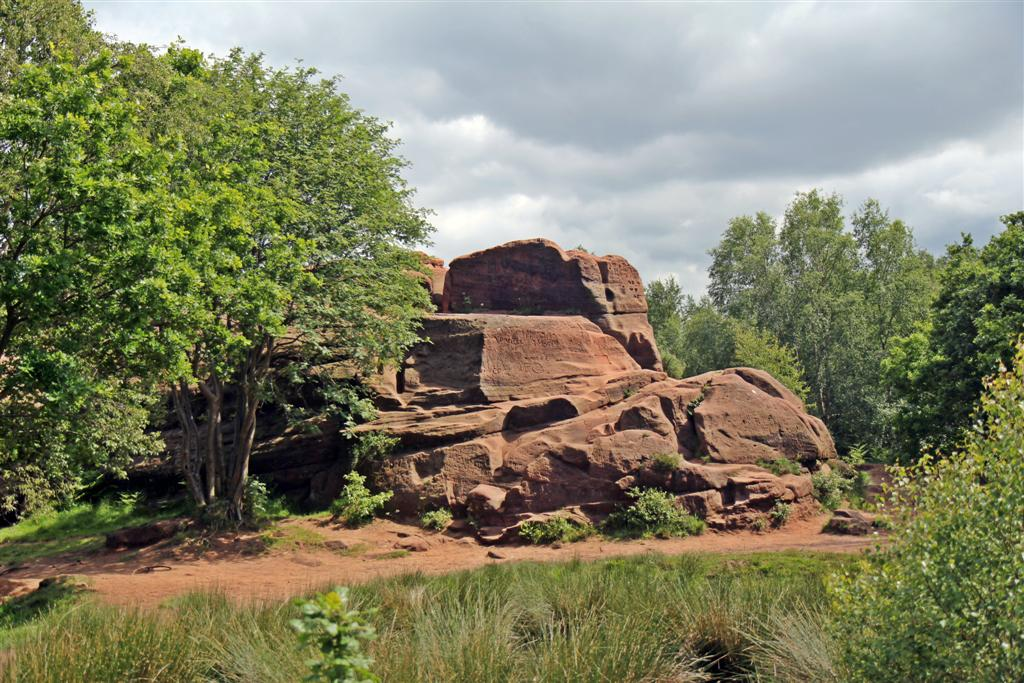
Thor's Stone.

Thurstaston Hill is the location of Thor's Stone, a large sandstone outcrop and a place of romantic legend. In the 19th century it was supposed that early Viking settlers may have held religious ceremonies here. A visit to the site by members of the British Archaeological Association in 1888 heard an account by Rev. A. E. P. Gray, rector of Wallasey, that the 'Thor Stone' was also known in the locality as 'Fair Maiden's Hall' and that children were "in the habit of coming once a year to dance around the stone". This part of Wirral was certainly part of a Norse colony centred on Thingwall in the 10th and 11th centuries. However, geologists and historians now think that the rock is a natural formation similar to a tor, arising from periglacial weathering of the sandstone, which was later exploited by quarrymen in the 18th and 19th centuries.

== Gallery ==
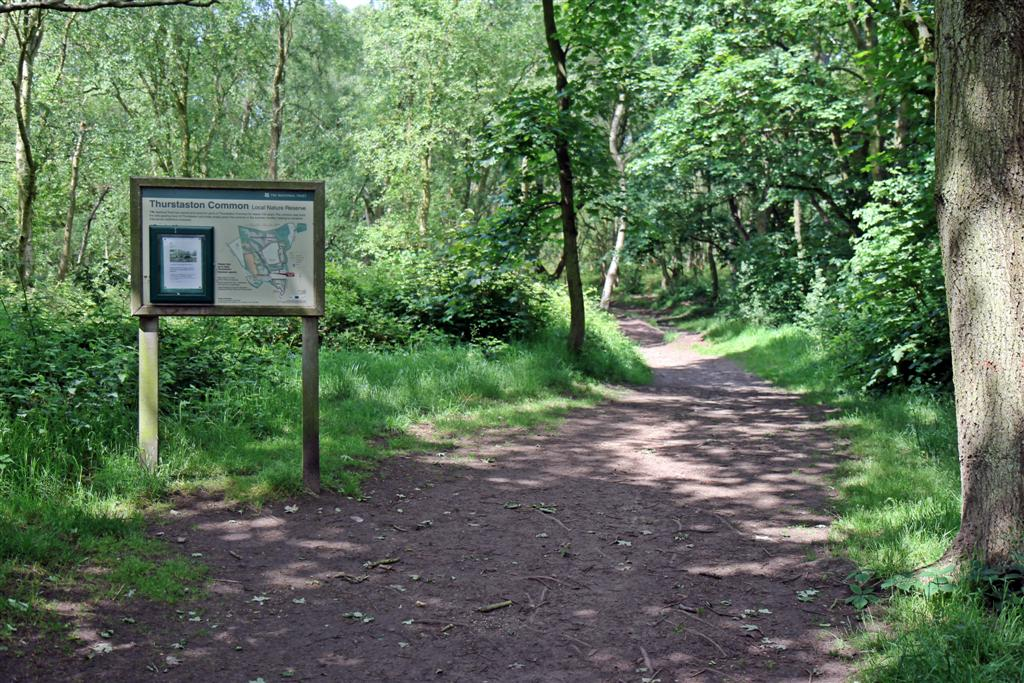
The path from School Lane

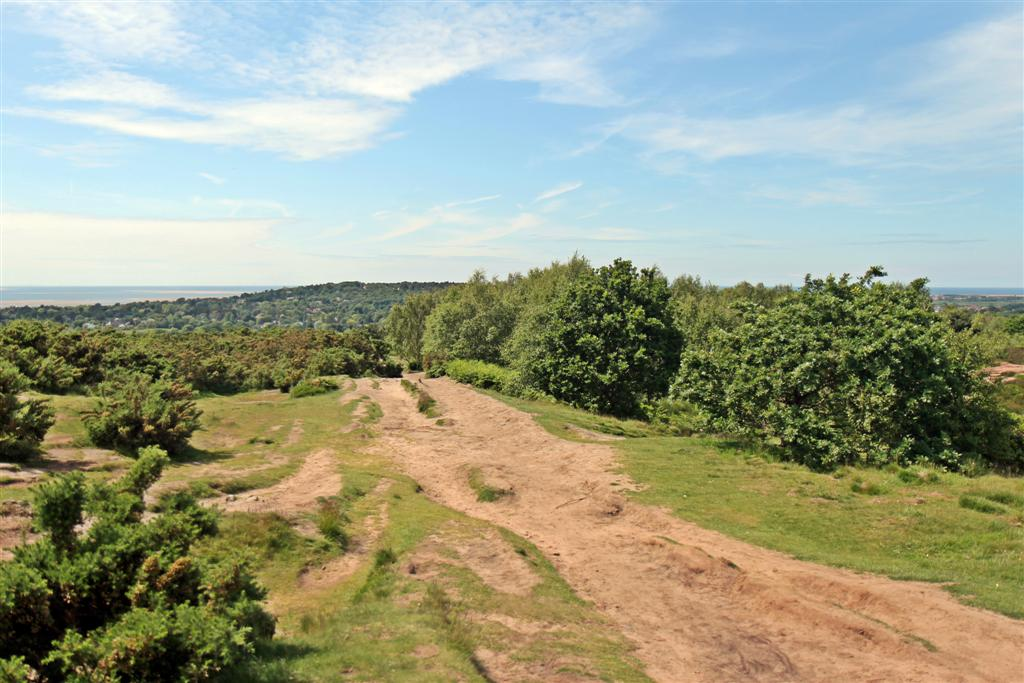
Pathway on Thurstaston Hill

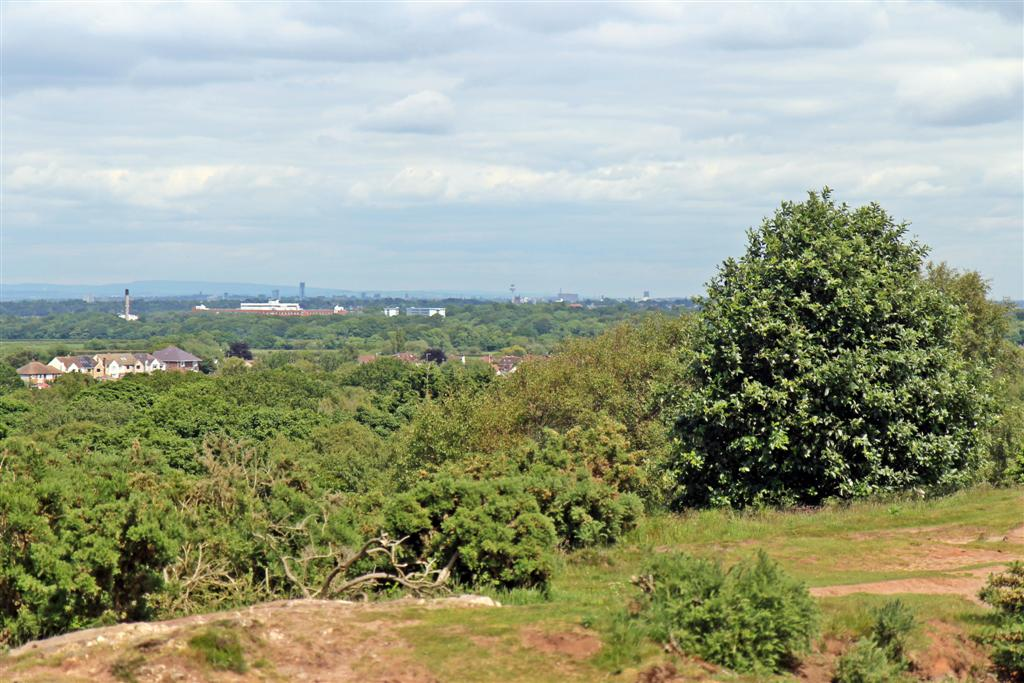
Looking towards Arrowe Park and Liverpool

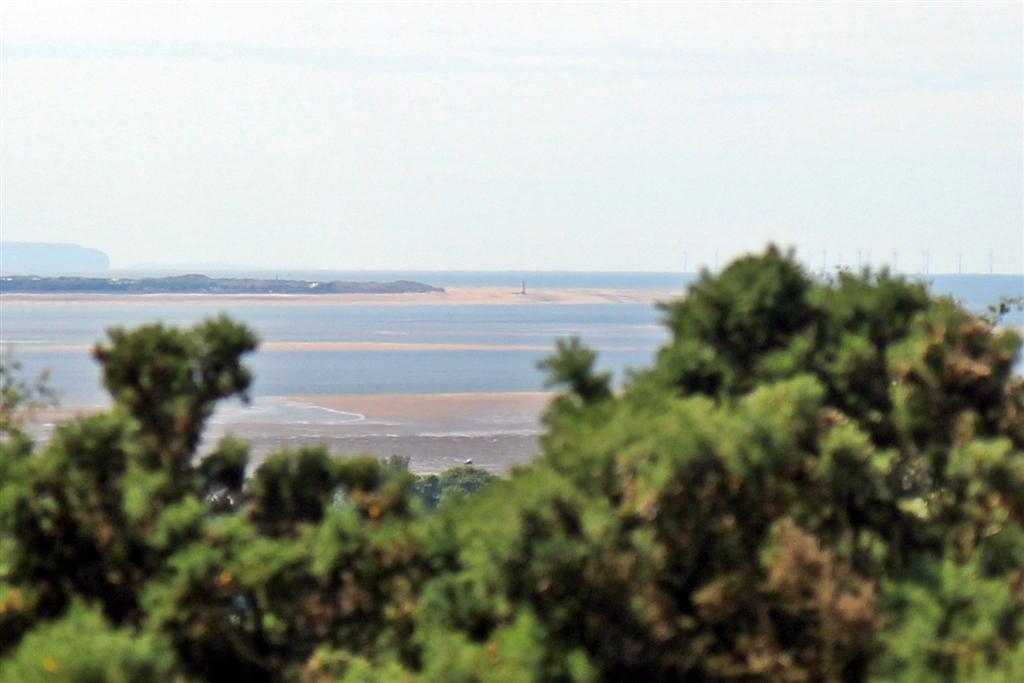
The view to Point of Ayr
