= Bank y Llong =

Welsh bank (1806–1815)

Aberystwith and Cardiganshire Bank
- Company type: Private company
- Traded as: Aberystwith and Cardiganshire Bank; Ship Bank; Banc y Llong
- Industry: banking
- Predecessor: Jones, Morgan & Davies
- Founded: 1 June 1806; 220 years ago in Aberystwyth, United Kingdom
- Founder: John Jones, David Davies, Thomas Morgan
- Defunct: 12 August 1815; 210 years ago
- Fate: Takeover
- Successor: Williams, Davies and Co.; The North and South Wales Bank; London, City and Midland Bank; Midland Bank
- Headquarters: Aberystwyth, Wales
- Area served: Ceredigion
- Key people: John Jones, David Davies, Thomas Morgan
- Products: lending, deposits
- Services: financial services
- Total assets: one branch
- Owner: John Jones, David Davies, Thomas Morgan

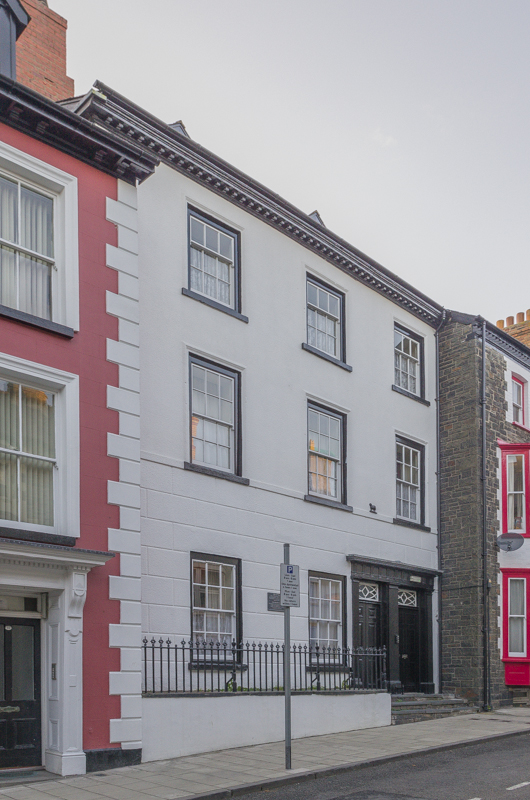

Bank y Llong (Ship Bank) (officially known as the Aberystwith and Cardiganshire Bank) was a Welsh bank. It got its name from an engraving of a ship decorating its bank notes (Llong means "ship" in the Welsh language). It was probably the first bank in Aberystwyth and was founded soon after the removal of the Custom House from Aberdyfi to Aberystwyth, around 1762.

== Establishment and partnership agreement ==
On 1 June 1806 an agreement was entered into whereby John Jones, a London-Welsh surgeon and apothecary, of Gracechurch Street, London and Derry Ormond, Ceredigion, Thomas Morgan, an Aberystwyth solicitor and David Davies, of Machynlleth later of Aberystwyth, then of Castle Green House, Cardigan, entered into partnership to carry on for 14 years a banking business under the name Jones, Morgan & Davies.

The partners were to raise the capital and share the profits in equal shares. John Jones had the right to nominate one of his sons to succeed him in the partnership if he died. If either of the other two partners died his interest in the business was to be calculated and the value paid to his executor. Any partner could terminate the partnership upon six months’ notice.

== Bank premises and staff ==
It is not clear if the 1806 agreement represented a variation of the earlier 1762 bank business, or the establishment of a new bank. The business was to be carried on in Aberystwyth and there was a restrictive covenant preventing them from entering into any other banking activity. There was a requirement for an annual statement of account.

The bank premises, stuccoed with corniced eaves, were located at 43 Bridge Street, Aberystwyth, in a row of three-storey late Georgian houses. The building is still known as The Old Bank House.

Under an agreement dated 1 July 1806, made between Rice Jones, from Dolgellau, and the partners in the Bank, Rice Jones became a bank clerk for three years at a salary of £30 per annum. He was given meat, drink, and lodging by David Davies, and the arrangement could be terminated by either party on six months’ notice. Rice Jones gave a guarantee bond for the sum of £1000 to the Bank in return.

== Succession ==
Between 1806 and 1808, Thomas Morgan died and the partnership admitted Thomas Williams of Aberystwyth as replacement partner. By means of an indenture dated 13 September 1808, Thomas Williams acquired a one-third share in the Bank, and otherwise on terms identical to the partnership deed of 1806. He was probably the brother of Evan Williams, with whom he was in partnership in a printing business in London, and which printed the first edition of Dr W.O. Pughe’s Welsh Dictionary.

Thomas Williams died on 15 April 1839, aged 53. His name appears in a list of donors, having given a donation of £100 towards the work in rebuilding St Michael’s Church (built 1829-33), Aberystwyth in 1830.

== Dissolution and regeneration ==
In 1815 the partnership was dissolved and a notice of dissolution appeared in the London Gazette on 12 August 1815, which stated that all local bank notes of the Bank would be paid at the banking house at Aberystwyth, while all notes payable in London would be paid at the house of Sir James Esdaile & Co., in London.

On 21 August 1816 the partners in the Bank made an assignment of their debts, probably in order to liquidate the assets of the Bank for distribution between the partners.

Despite dissolution of the partnership in 1815, and payment of creditors in full, the business appeared to have been continued by Thomas Williams. In 1832, a bank was doing business in Bridge Street, Aberystwyth called Williams, Davies & Co., with London agents being Sir James Esdaile & Co.

In about 1815 Williams either continued the bank or established a new one. It was known as Williams, Davies and Co. Rice Jones later became a partner with Henry Benson (a wine dealer and sometime a mayor and coroner).

The North and South Wales Bank took it over on 15 August 1836 and paid Benson and Rice Jones £3,000. Rice Jones became the manager at a salary of £400. The North and South Wales Bank was in New Street from about 1864 - 1885, then moved to a building on the south side of Great Darkgate Street. It planned to move over the road to a new building but while it was under construction, in 1908, the bank was taken over by the London, City and Midland Bank which later became the Midland.

When the bank was in Bridge Street it occupied a building owned by the Powells of Nanteos. It is listed in their rentals from 1815 (some of those for 1772-1795 exist but don’t mention a bank; those for 1796-1813 are missing). The names applied to the site are sometimes a little out of date since the list of rented properties was copied from one year to the next. 1815: referred to as the Aberystwyth Bank; 1816: Rentals missing; 1817-1819: referred to as the Banking Company; 1820-1826: referred to as Davies, Morris and Co; 1826-1835: referred to as the William, Davies and Co; 1834: referred to as the Williams, Davies, Benson, Jones and Co on map of Aberystwyth; 1836–1838; referred to as Messrs Benson and Co; 1839-1845: referred to as the Bank (property leased by Rice Jones Esq); 1846-1853: referred to as the North and South Wales bank; 1864: the property formerly occupied by the bank was available for lease.

== Bank notes ==
There is a note for £1 in the Ceredigion Museum (on loan from Powysland Museum) and another in the St Fagans National Museum of History in Cardiff.

== Other Aberystwyth banks ==
Other Aberystwyth banks included Aberystwyth and Tregaron Bank and Aberystwyth Provident Bank for Savings, both had branches on Bridge Street, Aberystwyth.
