= Banknotes of the Black Sheep Company of Wales Limited =

Banknotes of the Black Sheep Company of Wales Limited were private sterling banknotes issued between June 1969 and 1972 by the Welsh banker Richard Hugh Williams of Llandudno, Wales. The notes were a private issue by Williams's private banking venture, and each issue had to be approved by the Board of Trade. Although not official legal tender in Wales, they would have enjoyed a similar status to Scottish and Northern Irish banknotes as promissory notes.

== History ==
In March 1969 Richard issued notes called Banknotes of the Chief Treasury of Wales Limited. These continued to be issued until June 1969. The Board of Trade was uncomfortable with his use of the Welsh word for "treasury" in the name of his company - Prif Trysorfa Cymru Ltd ('Chief Treasury of Wales Ltd'), as it appeared to confer upon his endeavour the functions of state. The Board therefore imposed numerous restrictions on the denominations permitted, and refused to approve notes below the value of £5. The last issue of the Chief Treasury of Wales Ltd was a £1 million pound note.

== The use of the black sheep ==
Williams was forced to change the name of his company in 1969 and he selected Cwmni y Ddafad Ddu Gymreig Cyfyngedig ("Welsh Black Sheep Company Limited"), recalling the banknotes which had been issued in the early 19th century by the Aberystwyth and Tregaron Bank and which featured a picture of black sheep.

== Operation of the currency ==
The earliest issues contained a phrase in Welsh that referred to the Chief Treasury of Wales Limited, so that anyone who had the old notes knew who would exchange them for new notes. The phrase in question is "Gynt, Prif Trysorfa Cymru Cyfyngedig", the company thus describing itself as "formerly, Chief Treasury of Wales Ltd".

Williams had to send his banknotes to the Inland Revenue at Somerset House prior to issue; according to the law of the time, promissory notes each attracted a stamp duty payment by Williams of 2d, and notes were stamped with a "two pence" duty stamp. The Board of Trade imposed numerous restrictions on the denominations permitted, Williams's use of the term "£G" (meaning "Welsh pound", suggesting a separate currency) and his use of the Prince of Wales's feathers in the designs.

== Decimal currency issue ==
This issue was released into circulation as from the 15 February 1971. Williams ceased production of the notes and he was eventually declared bankrupt by Bangor Crown Court in 1978.

== See also ==
- Banknotes of the pound sterling
