= Uffington House, Chester =

Uffington House
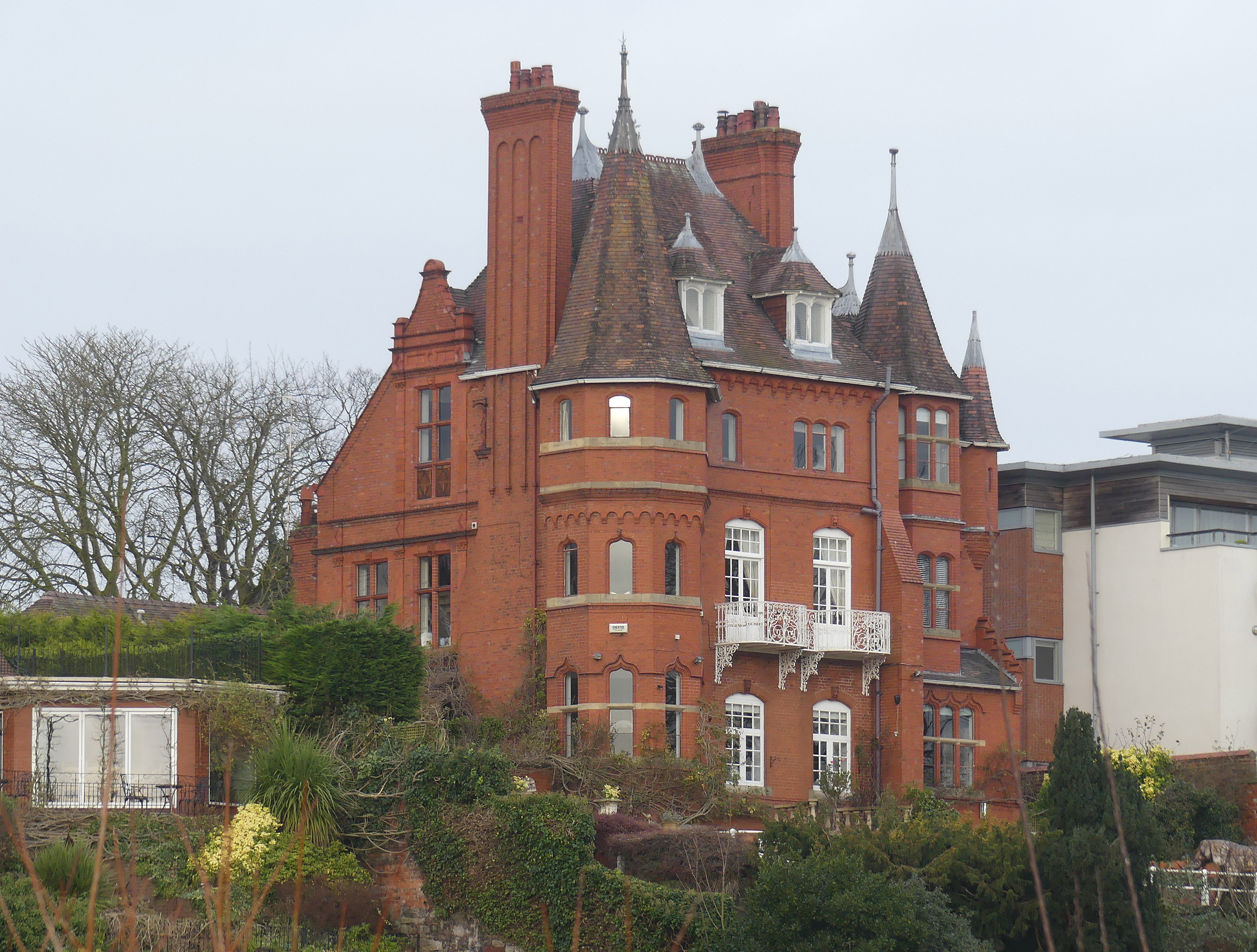
- Uffington House from the River Dee

- Location within Cheshire
- 53.1915°N 2.8777°W
- Location: Chester, United Kingdom

History
- Built: 1885
- Built for: Thomas Hughes

Site notes
- Architect: Edward Ould

Listed Building – Grade II
- Official name: Uffington House
- Designated: 10 January 1972
- Reference no.: 1375762

Uffington House is in Dee Hills Park, Chester, Cheshire, England. It was built in 1885 for Thomas Hughes, the author of Tom Brown's School Days, and designed by Edward Ould. It is constructed in red brick with stone and terracotta dressings and a red tile roof. The house is in three storeys with cellars and an attic. Its architectural features include turrets surmounted by spires with lead finials. The house is recorded in the National Heritage List for England as a designated Grade II listed building.

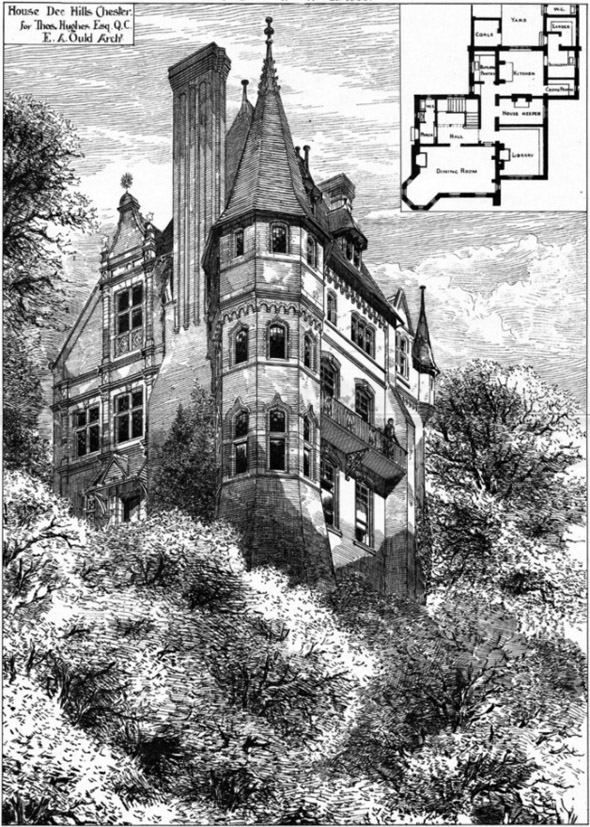
Uffington House as depicted in The Building News, 1885

== See also ==
- Grade II listed buildings in Chester (east)
- List of works by Grayson and Ould
