= Aberystwyth and Tregaron Bank =

Welsh bank of the early 19th century

Aberystwith and Tregaron Bank
- Type: Private company
- Traded as: Aberystwith and Tregaron Bank; Banc y Ddafad Ddu
- Industry: banking
- Predecessor: Evans, Jones, Davies & Co.
- Founded: 1 October 1810; 215 years ago in Aberystwyth, United Kingdom
- Founder: John Evans, Joseph Jones, William Davies
- Defunct: 10 August 1815; 210 years ago
- Fate: Administration and Closure
- Successor: none but imitated by R H Williams (1960s-1970s) who used the name "Cwmni y Ddafad Ddu Gymreig Cyfyngedig“
- Headquarters: Aberystwyth, Wales
- Area served: Ceredigion
- Key people: John Evans, William Davies
- Products: lending, deposits
- Services: financial services
- Revenue: unknown
- Operating income: unknown
- Net income: unknown
- Total assets: two branches
- Total equity: unknown
- Owner: John Evans, Joseph Jones, William Davis
- Number of employees: unknown
- Parent: not applicable
- Divisions: none
- Subsidiaries: branch at Tregaron
- Website: none but see: Everything Aberystwyth

The bank officially known as the Aberystwith and Tregaron Bank was established at Aberystwyth, Cardiganshire in the beginning of the 19th century and was locally known as ‘Banc y Ddafad Ddu’, because the bank notes were imprinted with an engraving of a black sheep. The bank later established a branch at Tregaron.

In the 1960s and 1970s the bank's notes inspired a Mr Richard Williams to imitate them.

== Banknotes ==
The notes were issued for ten shillings, £1, £2 and up to £10. The number of sheep on the engraving corresponded to the number of pounds represented by the bank note, though the £5 and £10 notes bore respectively one ram and two rams. The ten shilling note had an illustration of a lamb.

The earliest note appears to have been issued on 1 October 1810 and bears the signature of William Davies on behalf of Evans, Jones, Davies & Co. A number of notes have been preserved signed either by John Evans or by William Davies. The notes are all dated within the period 1810 to 1814.

Original Black Sheep bank notes are held by the British Museum and Ceredigion Museum. Llanidloes Museum holds original promissory notes issued by the Bank.

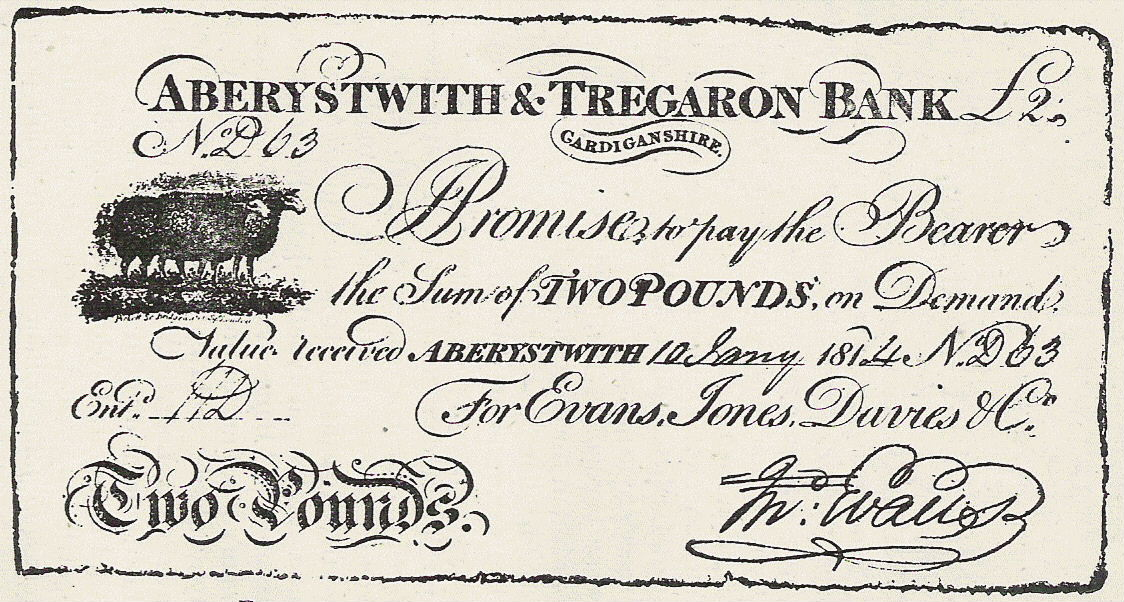
Banknote of the Aberystwith and Tregaron Bank

== Members of the bank ==
The members of the bank were John Evans of Penygraig, Aberystwyth, Joseph Jones and William Davies, and their London agents at that date were Veres, Smart, Baron & Co.

== Tregaron branch ==
The bank opened a branch in Tregaron in 1810, as a result of the thriving local economy based on wool, droving, agriculture, and supporting businesses, such as blacksmiths and public houses.

== Liquidation ==
The bank was in trouble by 1811, as an advert in the Carmarthen Journal recorded: Evans, Jones, Davies and Co, Bankers of the Aberystwith and Tregaron Bank beg leave to inform the public that their bank has been open for business since its commencement and will continue so, notwithstanding an attempt lately made to injure it by inveterate enemies."

In 1815 it went into liquidation. "Aberystwyth Old Bank. Messrs Jones, Davies and Williams beg to inform the public that the dissolution of their form has taken place by mutual consent, and they will feel obliged by the holders of their local notes sending them for payment to their Banking house, at Aberystwyith and those made payable in London to the House of Sir James Esdaile and Co. Aberystwyth Old bank, August 10, 1815."

Debts were still due to the bank in 1820. "Aberystwith and Tregaron Bank. Evans, Jones and Davies Bankruptcy (public notice). Any debts to the above to be paid by 1 November 1820 to William Leyburn of Aberystwyth or Thomas Jones, ropemaker."

A number of notes bear a memorandum stamped across the face of the note stating that they had been exhibited before G. Bonsall under a commission of bankruptcy against the firm, and that a first dividend of 6s. 8d. in the £ had been paid. The memorandum does not bear a date, but it appears that no other dividend was received by the owners of the notes.

== Imitation ==
During the late 1960s and early 1970s, Richard Williams of Llandudno issued private banknotes which bore a 2d (2 "old" pence) duty stamp, which he paid for. This meant, in his view, that the notes were "officially" recognised.

The first issues were made by "y Prif Trysorfa [sic] Cymru Cyfyngedig" ("the Chief [T]reasury of Wales Ltd"), and the significance of this company name appears to have been overlooked initially by the Stamp Office, as the notes were written in Welsh. It is unlikely that the notes would have been officially stamped – or even that registration of such a company name would have been allowed – if this had been recognised.

When officials demanded that the company name be changed, Williams changed it to "Cwmni y Ddafad Ddu Gymreig Cyfyngedig" (the "Welsh Black Sheep Company Ltd"), a name inspired by the bank note issues of the Aberystwyth & Tregaron Bank. Again, it seems that the Stamp Office was unaware of this historical precedent and the significance of the name. They duly officially stamped these issues also.

== Other Aberystwyth banks ==
Other Aberystwyth banks include Bank Y Llong and Aberystwyth Provident Bank for Savings, both had branches on Bridge Street, Aberystwyth.

== See also ==
- Banknotes of the Chief Treasury of Wales Limited
- Banknotes of the Black Sheep Company of Wales Limited
