= Edward Ould =

British architect

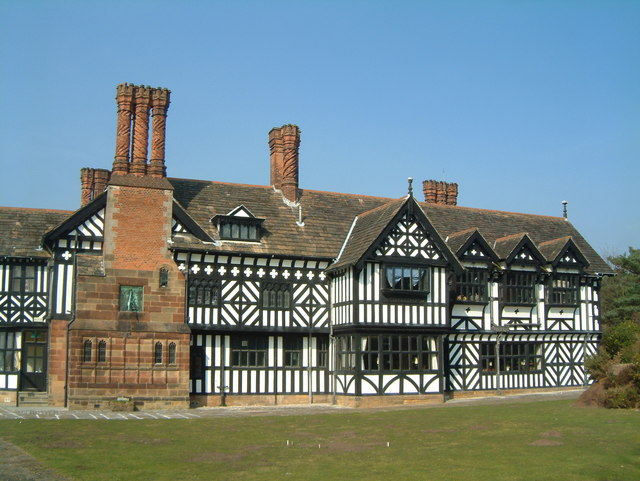
Hill Bark

Edward Augustus Lyle Ould (1852–1909) was an English architect.

Ould was a son of the rector of Tattenhall, Cheshire. He became a pupil of the Chester architect John Douglas and in 1886 he joined in partnership with the Liverpool architect G. E. Grayson. His early work was influenced by Douglas, particularly his use of half-timbering. In 1904 he was the joint author of a book on half-timbered buildings.

Before he joined Grayson, Ould's works include Uffington House, and the Queen's School, both in Chester, and both influenced by Douglas. After joining Grayson, Ould is given credit for the design of Hill Bark, originally built as Bidston Court in Bidston Hill, and later moved to Frankby, Merseyside. The firm of Grayson and Ould is best known for their designs at Trinity Hall and Selwyn College in Cambridge University, and Ould himself for two houses for the Mander family at Wightwick Manor and The Mount, both near Wolverhampton.

== Bibliography ==
- Parkinson, James; Ould, Edward (1904), Old Cottages, Farm Houses, and other Half-Timber Buildings in Shropshire, Herefordshire and Cheshire, London

== See also ==
- List of works by Grayson and Ould
