= George Enoch Grayson =

English architect

George Enoch Grayson FRIBA (7 June 1833 – 7 November 1912) was an English architect from Liverpool. He was the son of shipbuilder John Dorlin Grayson and Jane Dixon Grayson. He was articled to Jonathan Gilliband Sale in 1851, travelled on the Continent for 12 months in 1856, and opened an independent practice the following year. In 1886, he formed a partnership with Edward Ould, and in the same year he was elected a Fellow of the Royal Institute of British Architects. His son George Hastwell Grayson (1871–1951) was also an architect in Liverpool, and became a partner in the same practice. He worked in UK.

== See also ==
- List of works by Grayson and Ould
