= Liverpool Hilton =

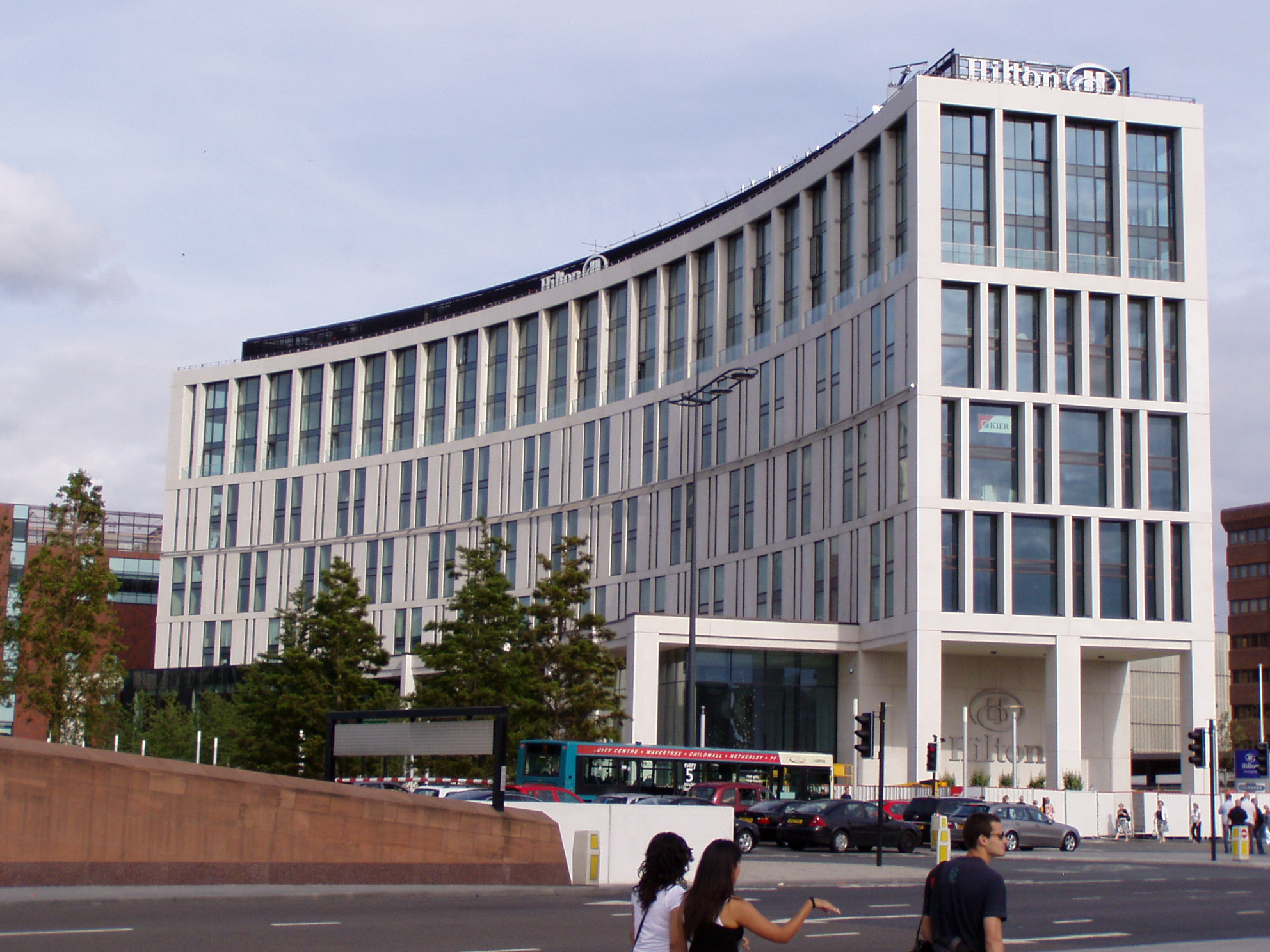
Hilton Hotel, Liverpool One

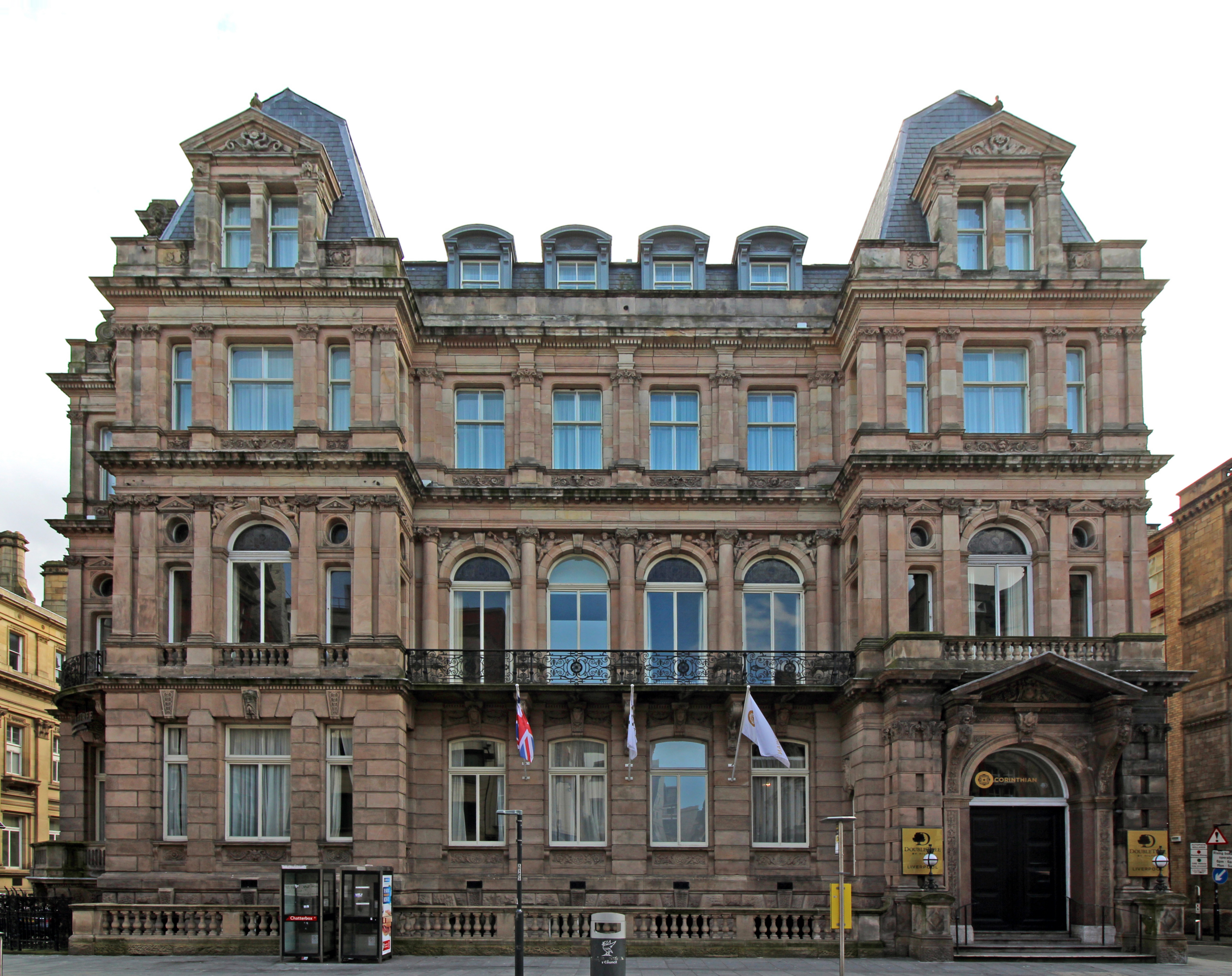
DoubleTree by Hilton Liverpool

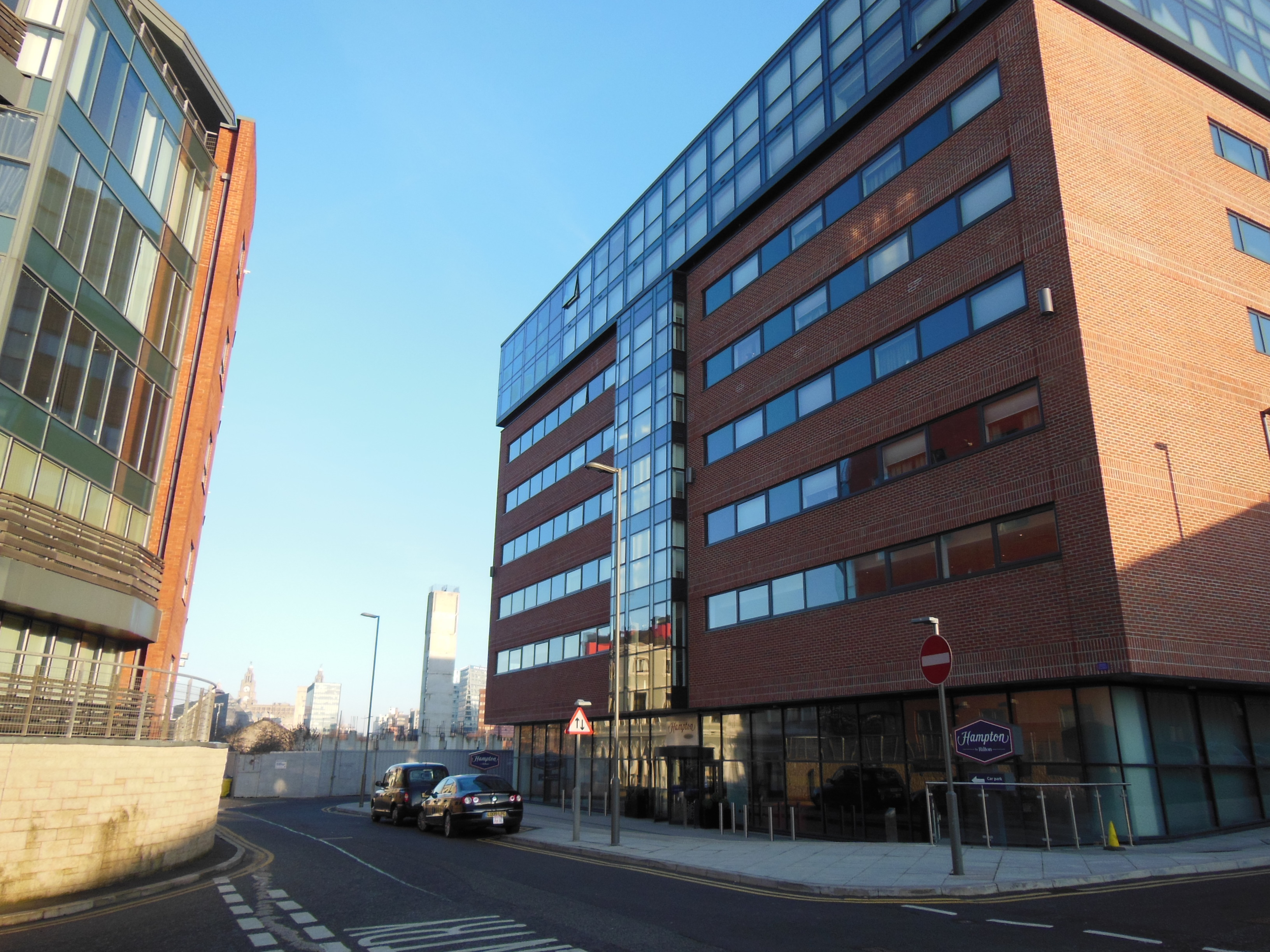
Hampton by Hilton Liverpool City Centre

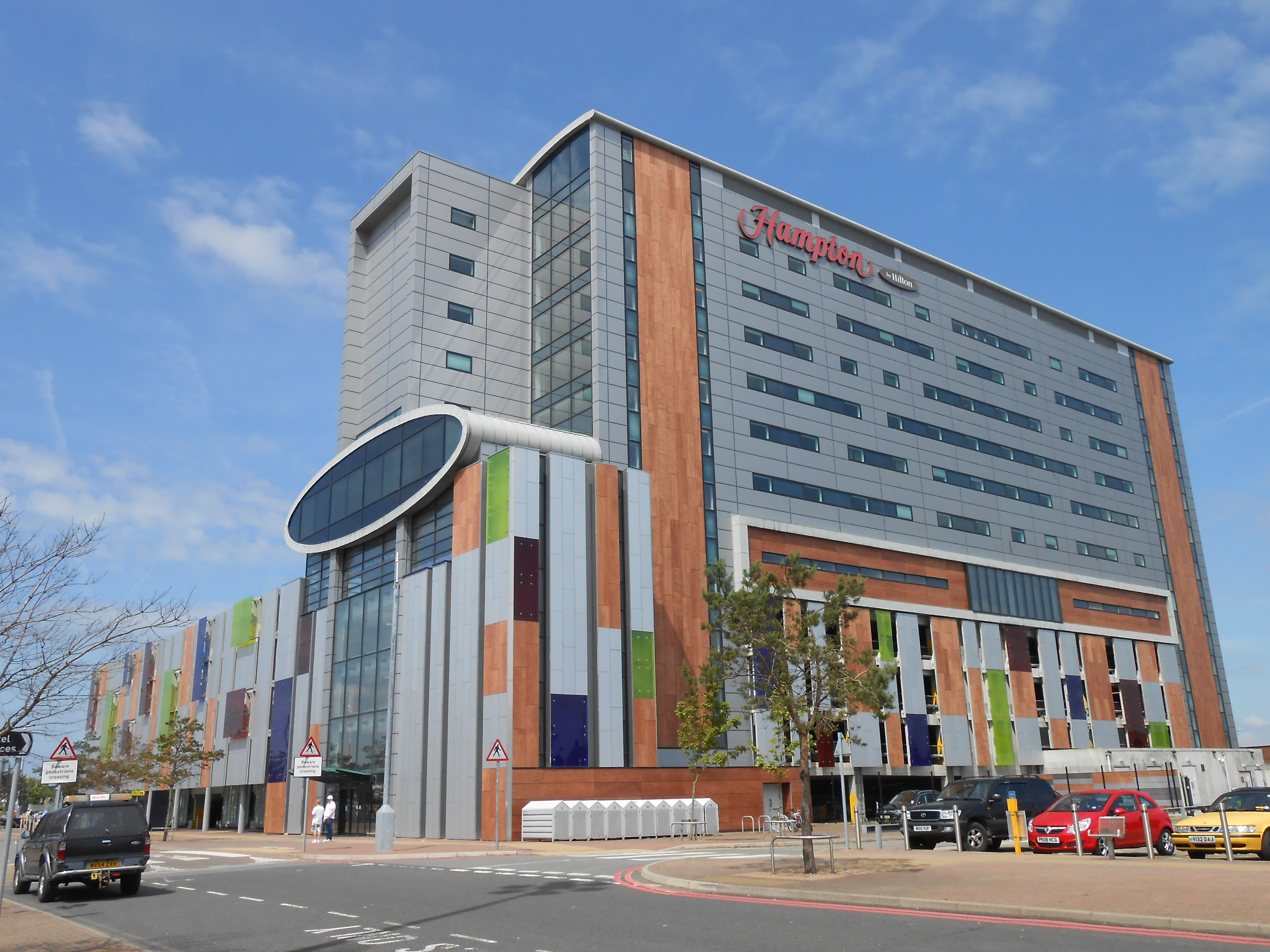
Hampton by Hilton Liverpool John Lennon Airport

Liverpool Hilton could refer to one of four hotels in Liverpool, England, United Kingdom:

- Hilton Liverpool City Centre, 3 Thomas Steers Way, Liverpool One
- DoubleTree by Hilton Liverpool (Municipal Annexe), 6 Sir Thomas Street
- Hampton by Hilton Liverpool City Centre, Kings Dock Mill, 7 Hurst Street
- Hampton by Hilton Liverpool John Lennon Airport, Speke Hall Avenue
