= Municipal Buildings, Liverpool =

Listed building in Liverpool, England

Municipal Buildings
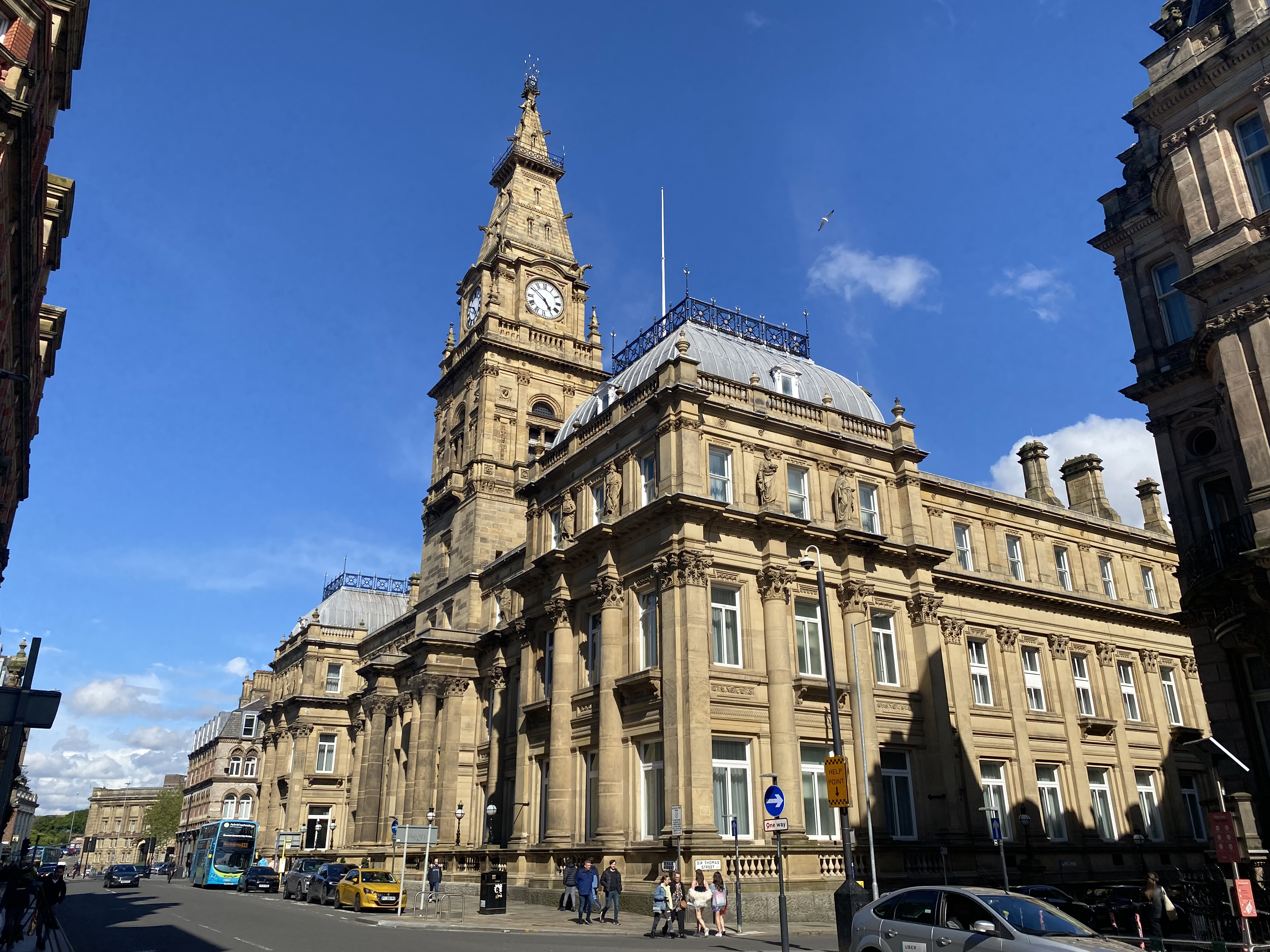
- Municipal Buildings, Dale Street

General information
- Architectural style: Second Empire
- Location: Dale Street, Liverpool, England
- Coordinates: 53.4085°N 2.9862°W
- Year built: 1862–68
- Designations

Listed Building – Grade II*
- Official name: Municipal Buildings
- Designated: 12 July 1966
- Reference no.: 1068281

Municipal Buildings is a former council office building that has been converted into a hotel. It is located on Dale Street in the centre of Liverpool, England and is a Grade II* listed building.

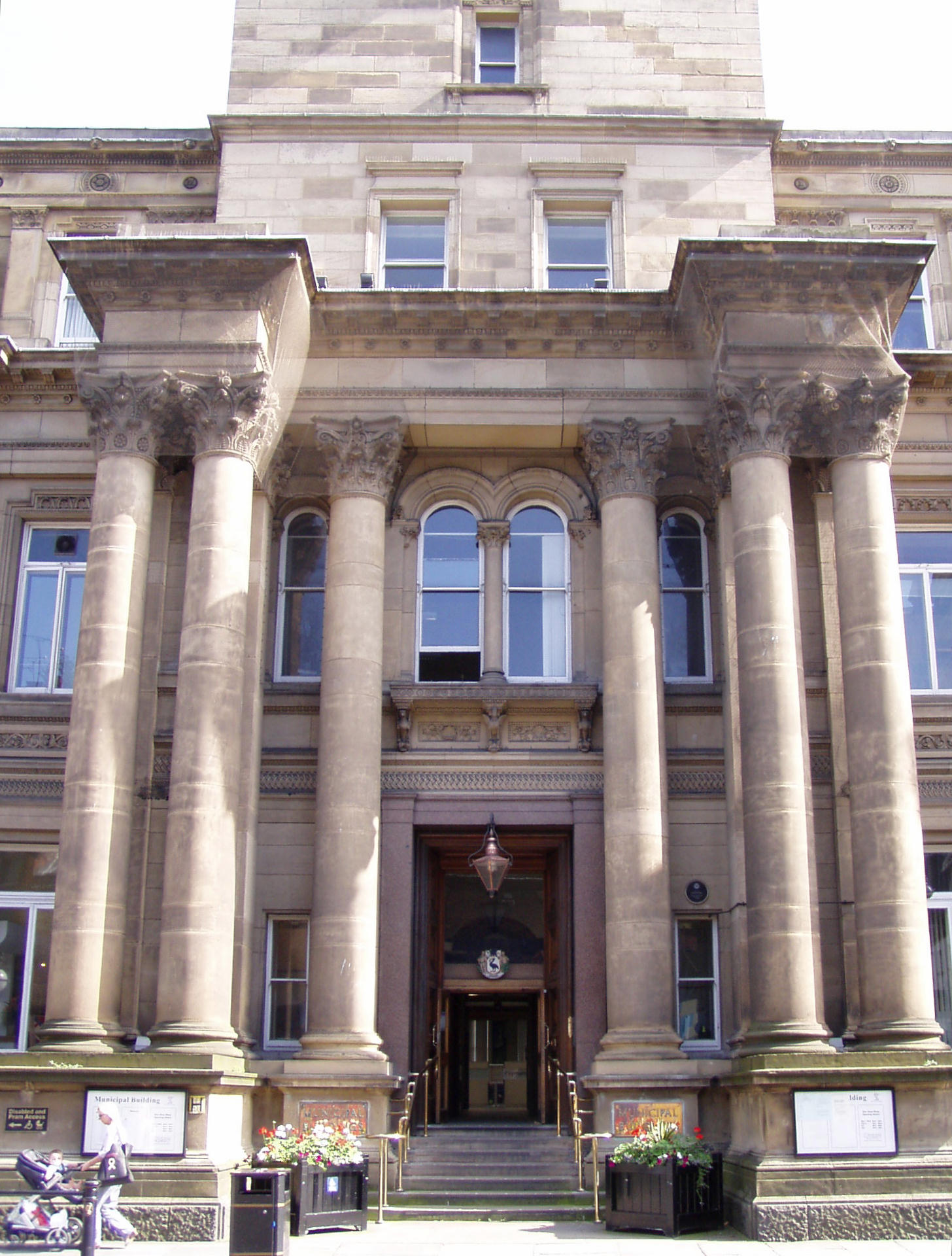
Main entrance, Dale Street

== History ==
The building was built by the town council to accommodate the growing number of administrative staff. Work was started in 1862 by Liverpool Corporation surveyor John Weightman, and finished by Edward Robert Robson in 1868. The building was put up for sale by the council in 2016 as it was deemed "surplus to requirements" and too expensive to run and maintain.

In January 2016, it was announced that Singapore-based international property group Fragrance Group had bought the building and were planning on turning it into a hotel. The remaining 640 council staff then working in the building were moved to other offices within the city ahead of the sale. Work began in autumn 2020.

The project was worth £80 million including the acquisition costs, and involved the creation of a four-storey extension at the back of the building, allowing the facility to have a pool, spa, gym and space for 179 suites and bedrooms for guests.

The building opened on 10 May 2023 as 'The Municipal Hotel Liverpool, MGallery' by Accor the French multinational hotel chain.

== Architecture ==
The quadrangular building has three storeys and is built of stone with a lead roof. The Dale Street frontage is over 220 ft (67 m) wide and the sides of the building extend back 197 ft (60 m) along Crosshall Street and Sir Thomas Street. Pavilions at each corner are topped by convex-hipped mansard-style roofs with ornamental ironwork. The design of the building was influenced by the Second Empire style. Distributed along the attic storey are eighteen sandstone figures representing the arts, sciences and industries of Liverpool (see gallery below).

In the centre of the building, above the main Dale Street entrance, is a 210 ft (64 m) tower containing a clock and five bells; (the clock was by Messrs Pendlinton & Hutton of Liverpool, the bells by Warner & Sons). The four quarter bells are hung for English-style Change Ringing. A two-stage pyramidal spire is situated on the top the tower. There are balconies at the belfry level and clock level, and halfway up the spire.

Inside, the building contained the offices of various officials (which had previously been scattered in different locations around the city). The principal offices were at ground-floor level. Directly behind the main entrance hall was the Treasurer's Public Office, a two-storey hall which filled the centre of the internal quadrangle. To the left were the offices of the Borough Engineer, the Treasurer and the Medical Officer of Health; to the right were the Town Clerk, Deputy Town Clerk and Water Engineer. There were also several committee rooms on this side. At first floor level, the principal offices facing Dale Street were occupied by the Borough Architect and Surveyor. The clerks of the various departments were accommodated in offices on the upper floors.

== Gallery of statues ==
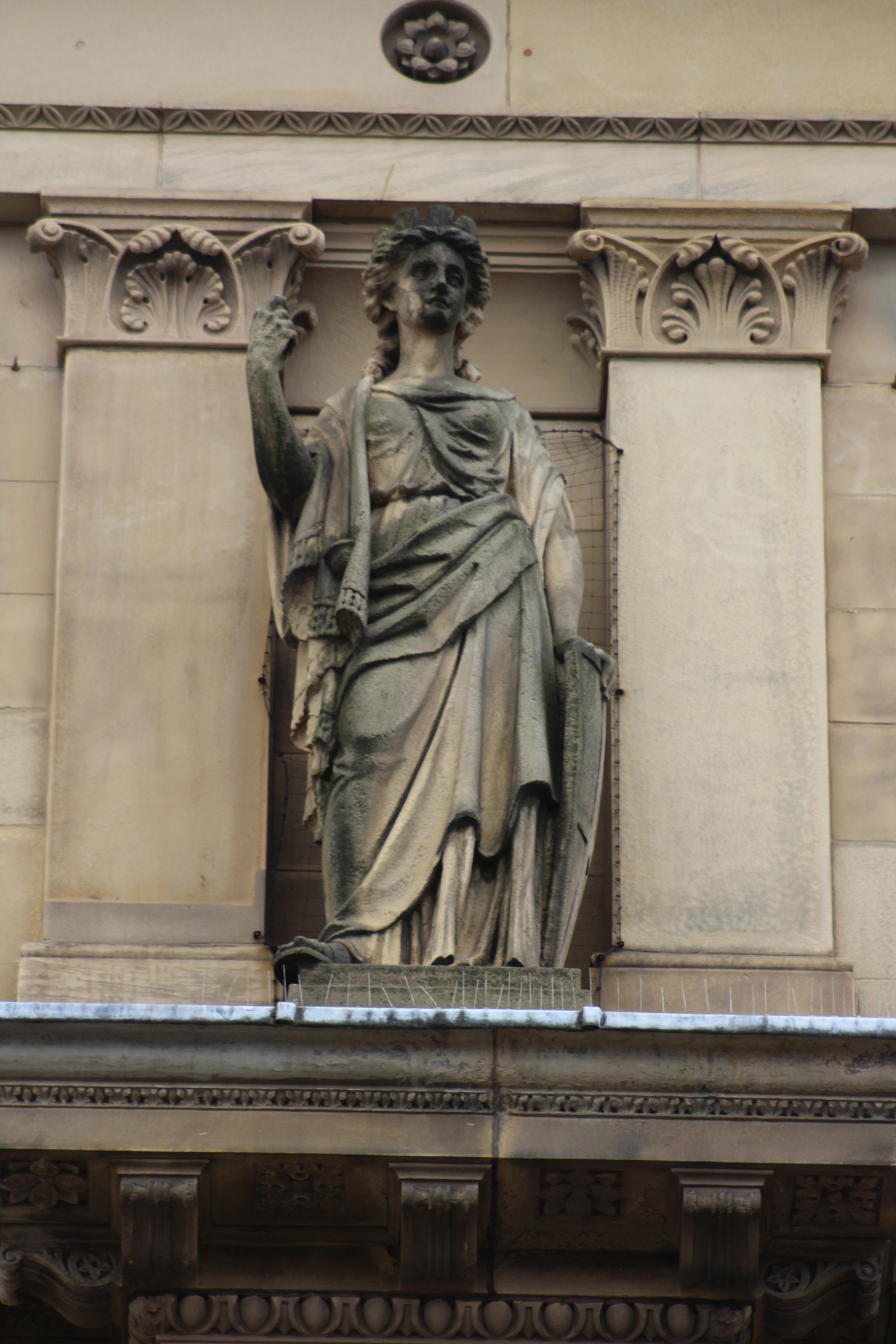
Europe, Dale Street front

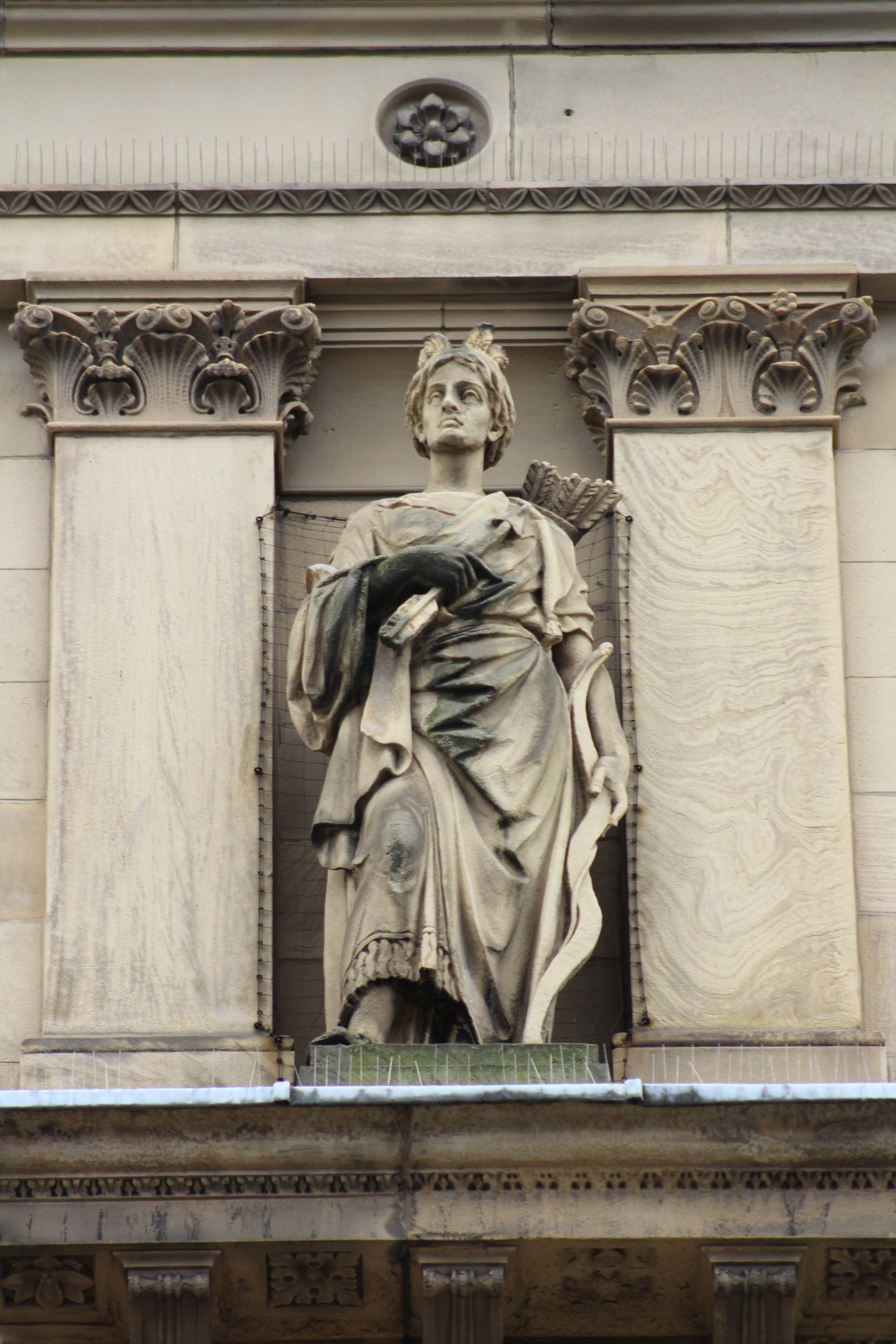
America, Dale Street front

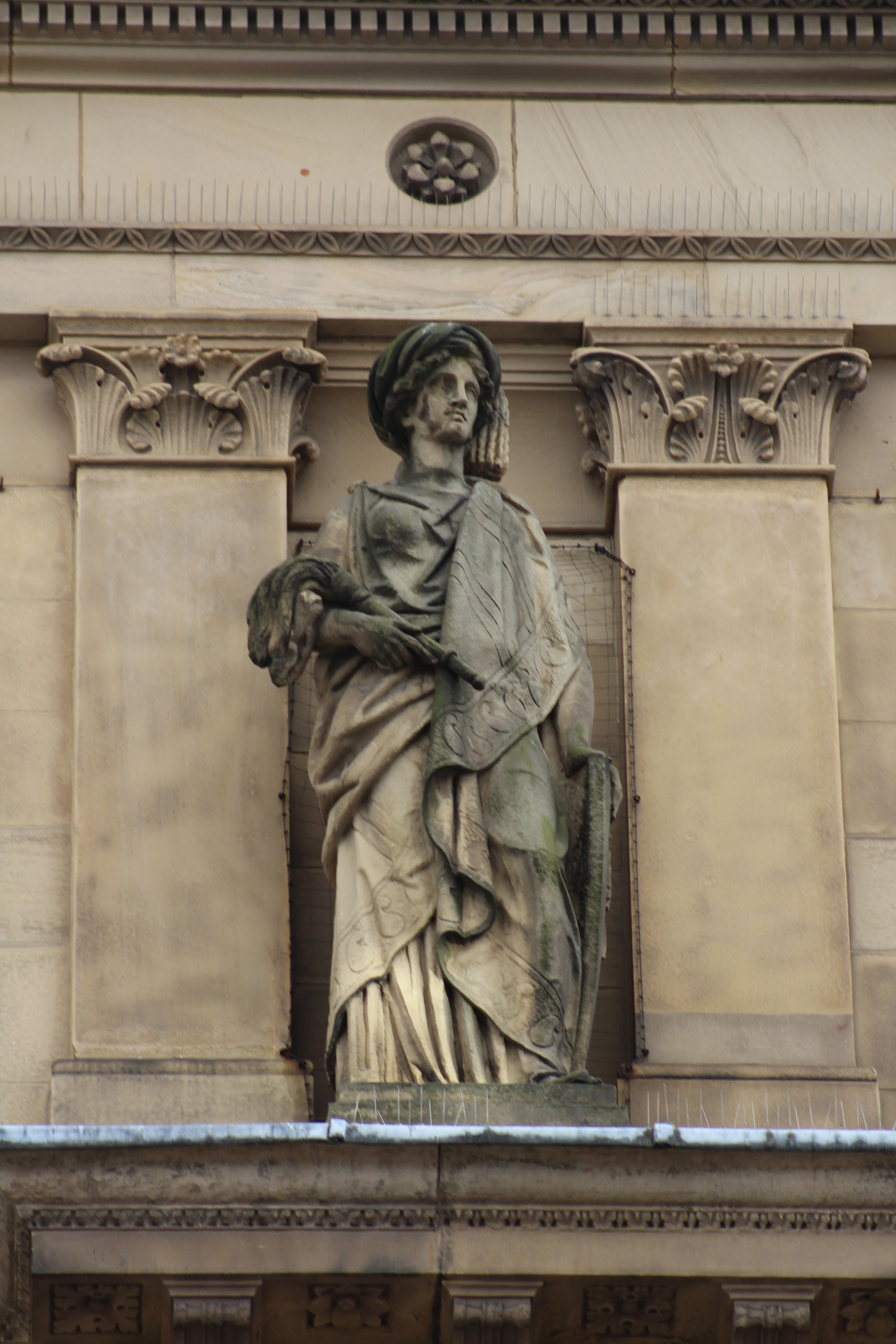
Asia, Dale Street front

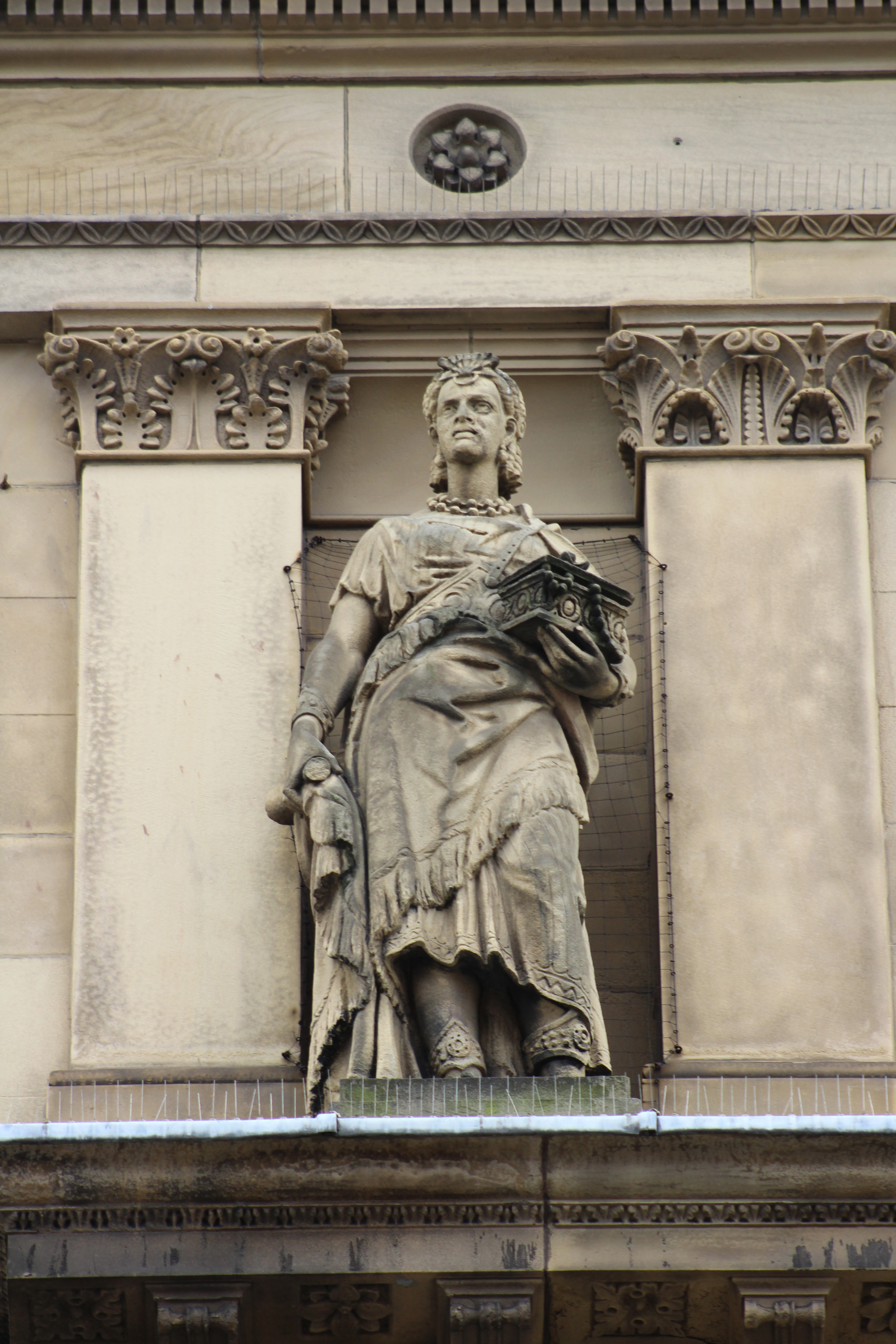
Africa, Dale Street front

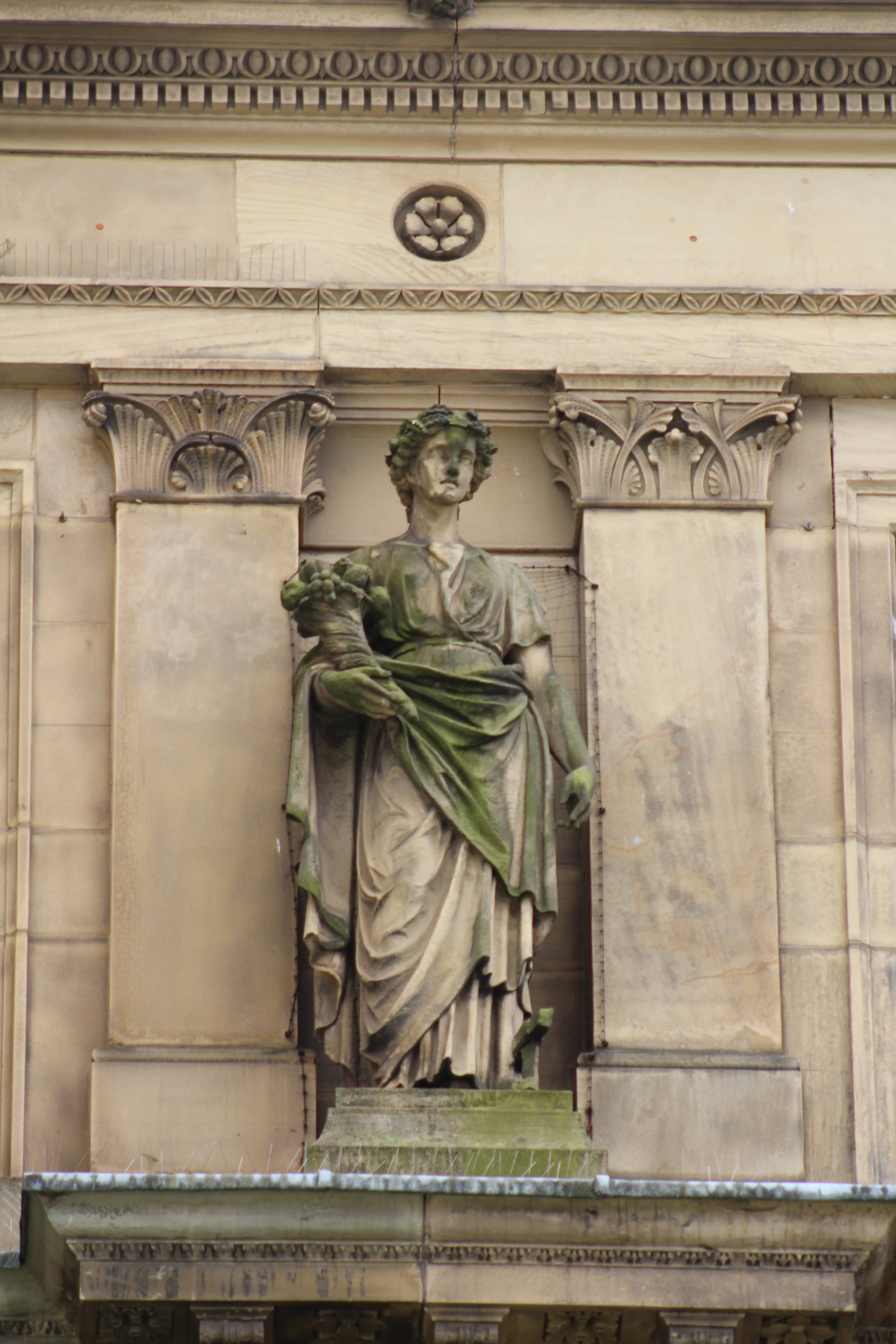
Agriculture, Dale Street front

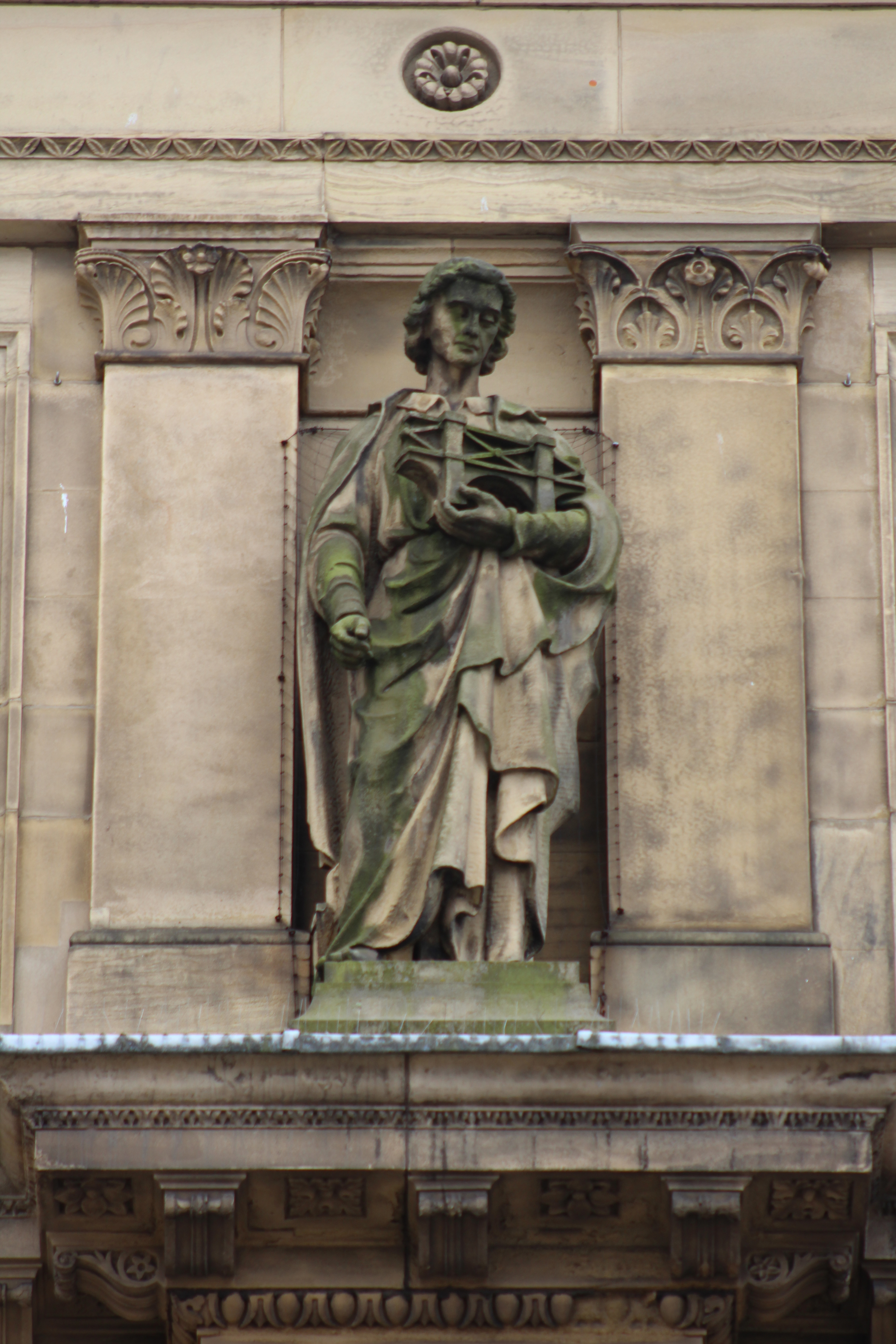
Manufacturing, Dale Street front

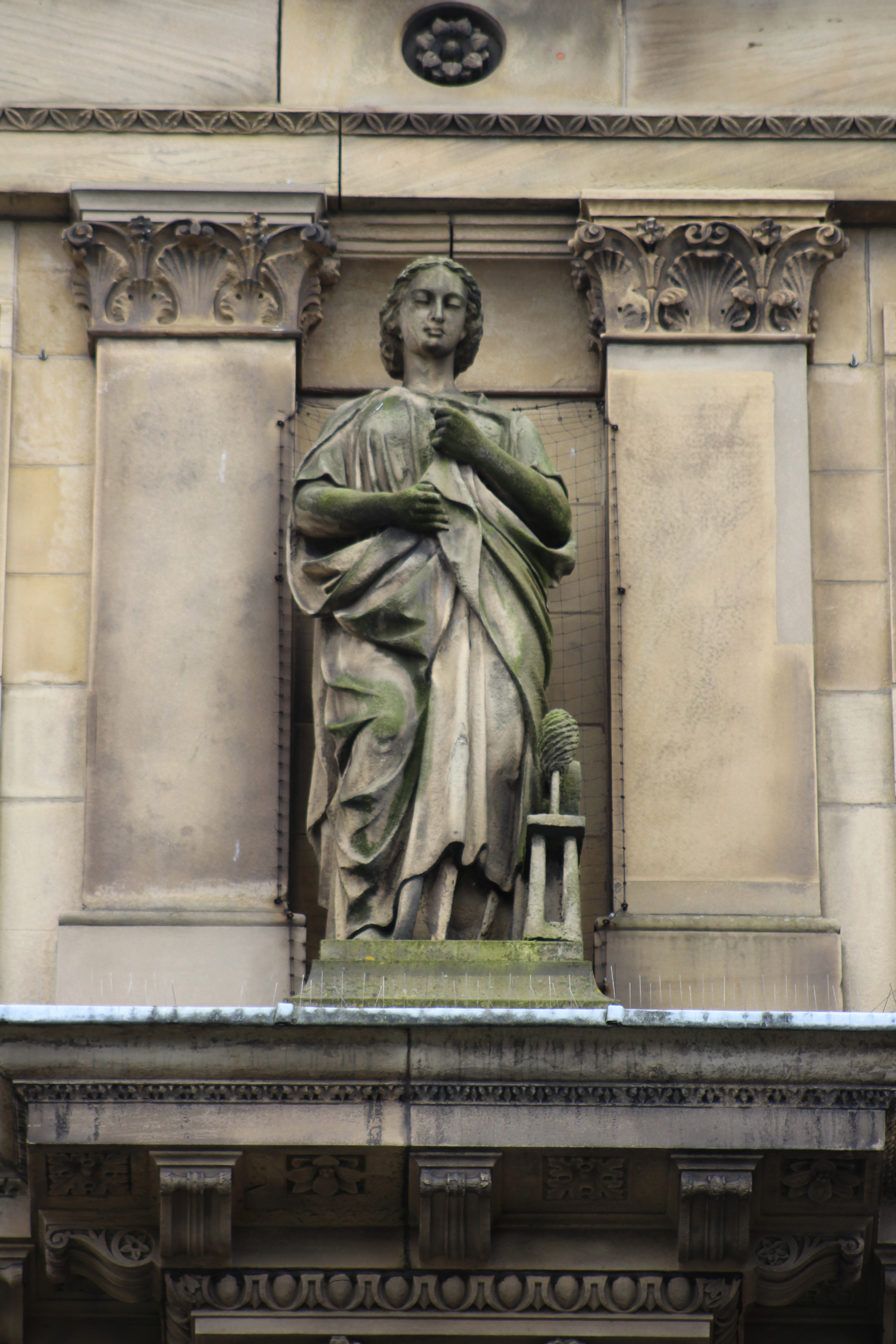
Cotton, Dale Street front

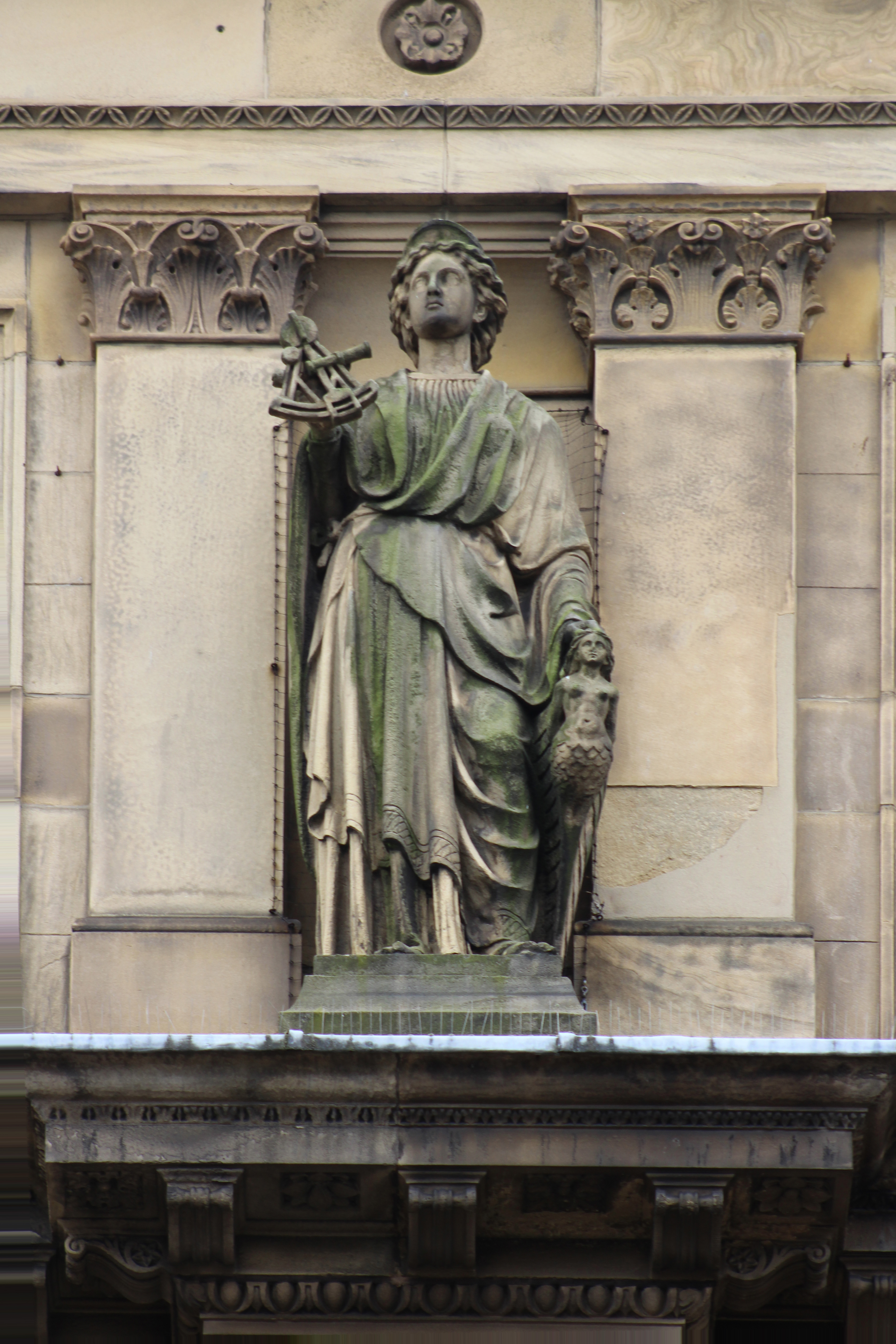
Navigation, Dale Street front

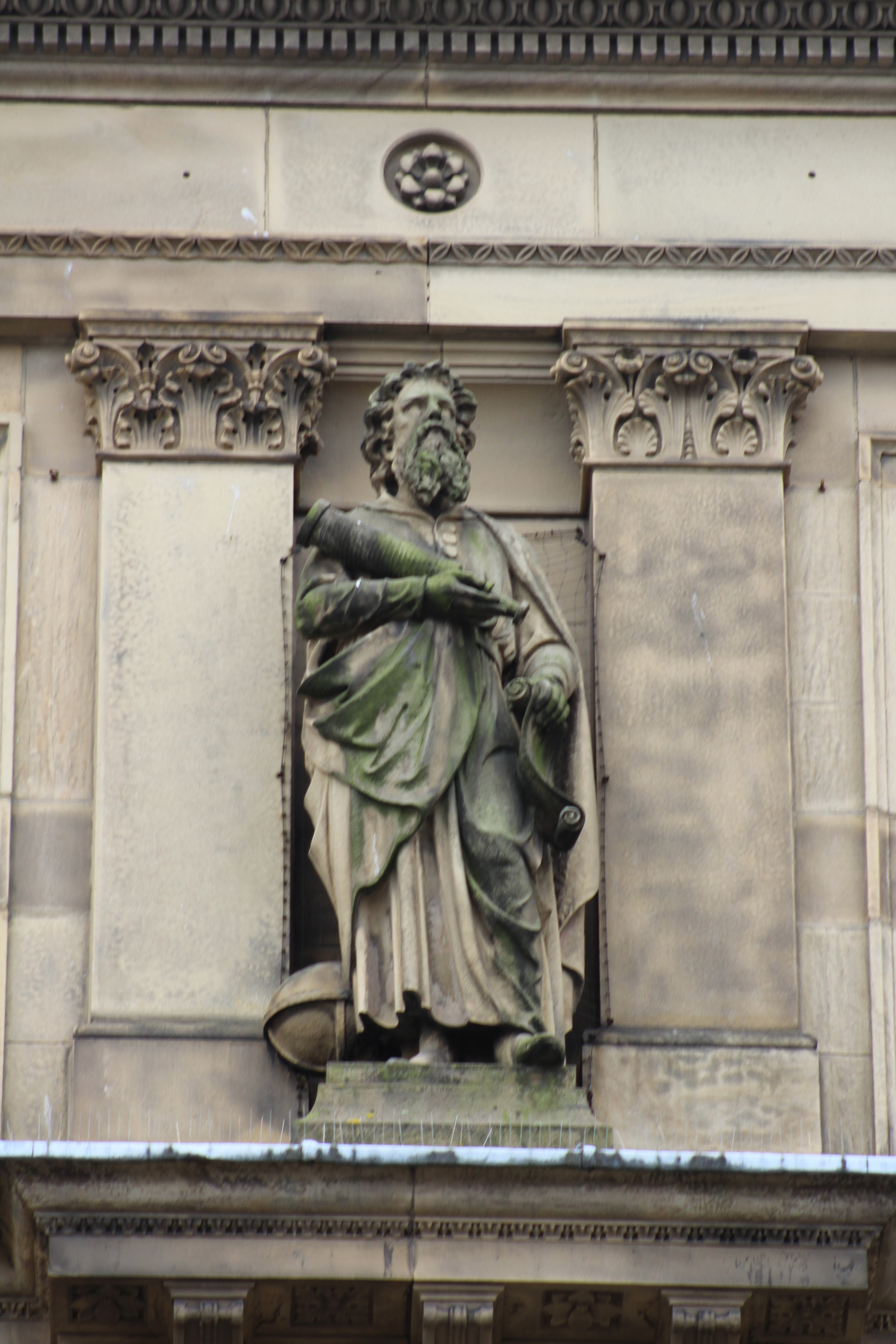
Astronomy, Dale Street front

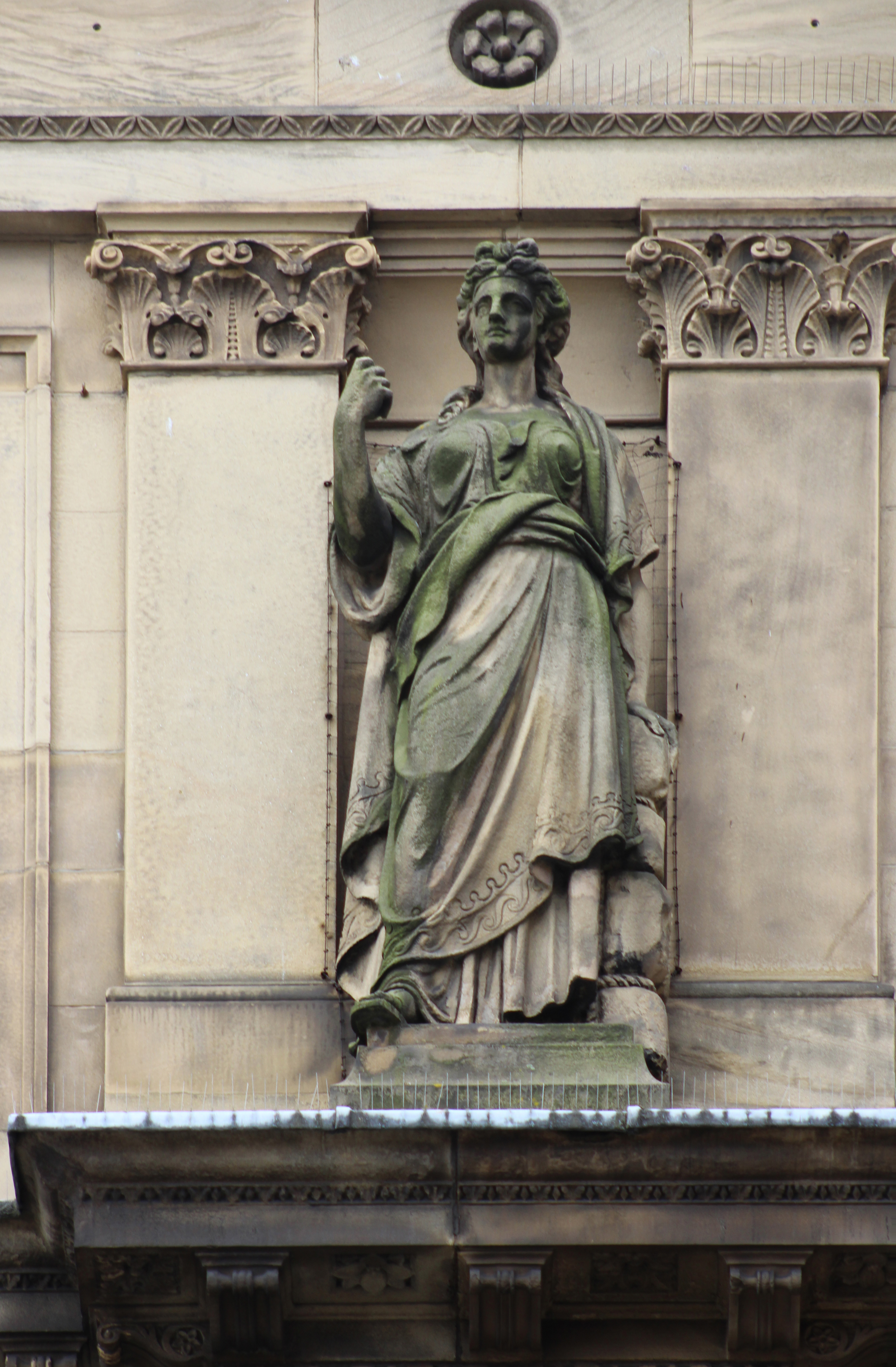
Trade, Dale Street front

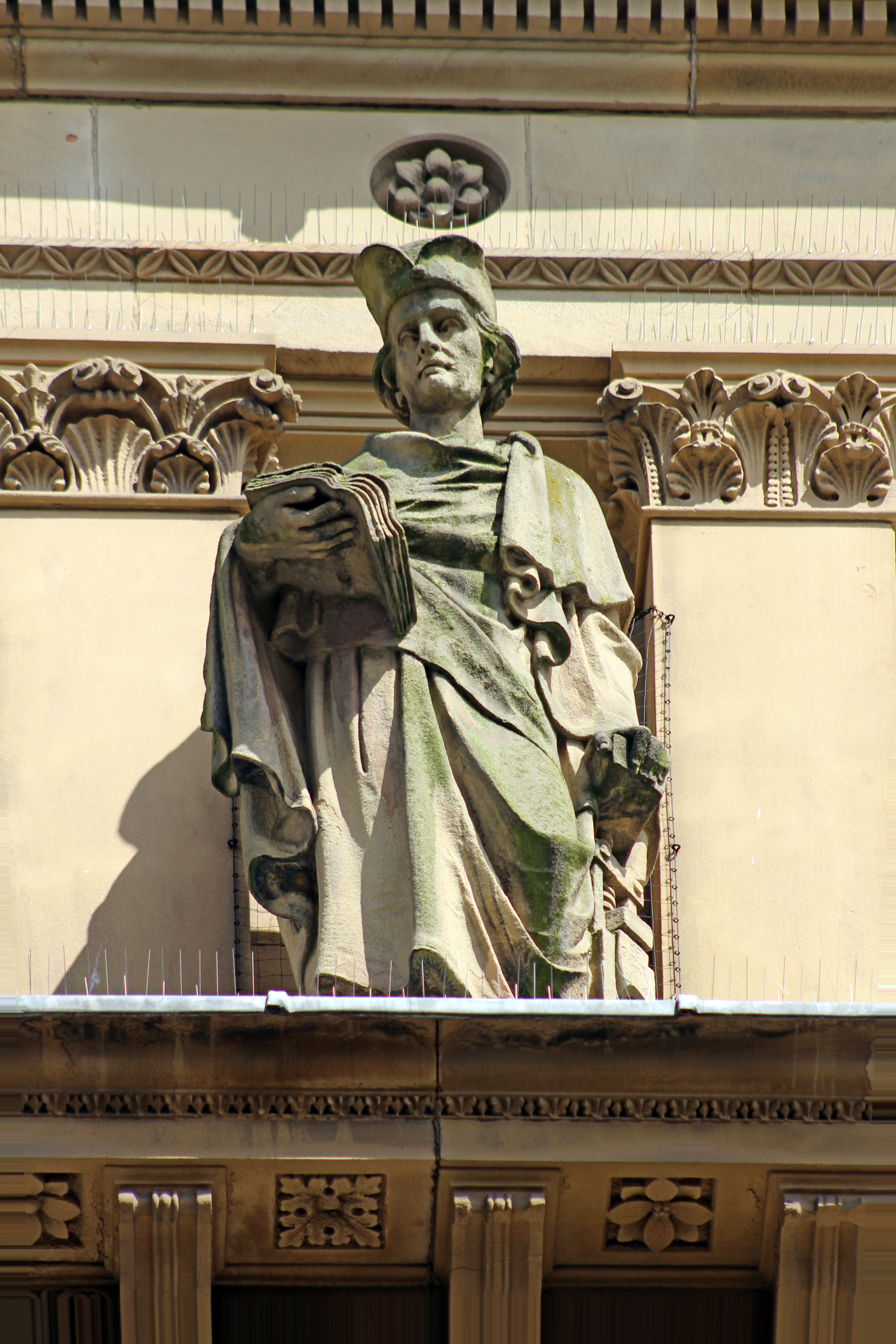
Literature, Sir Thomas Street front

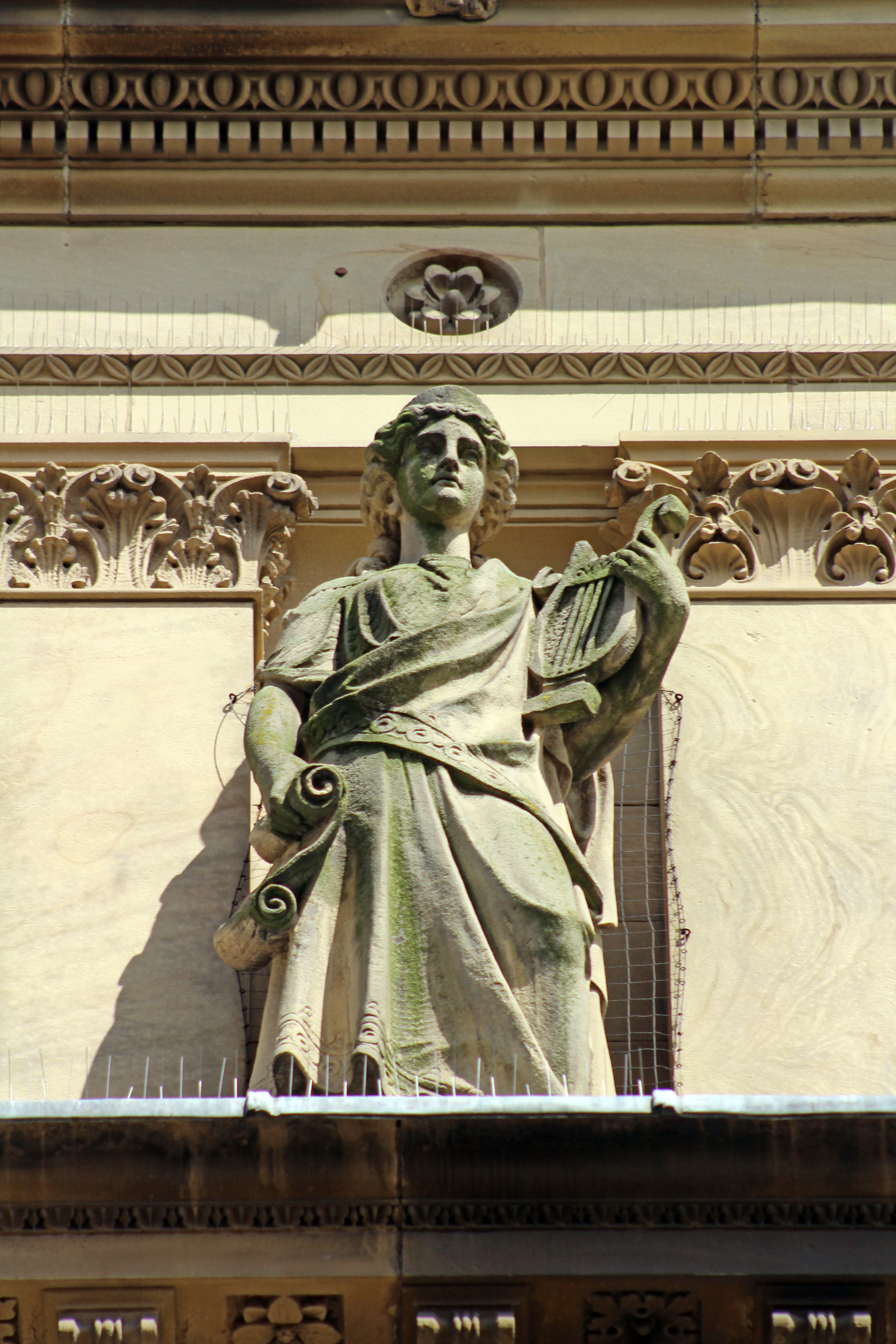
Music, Sir Thomas Street front

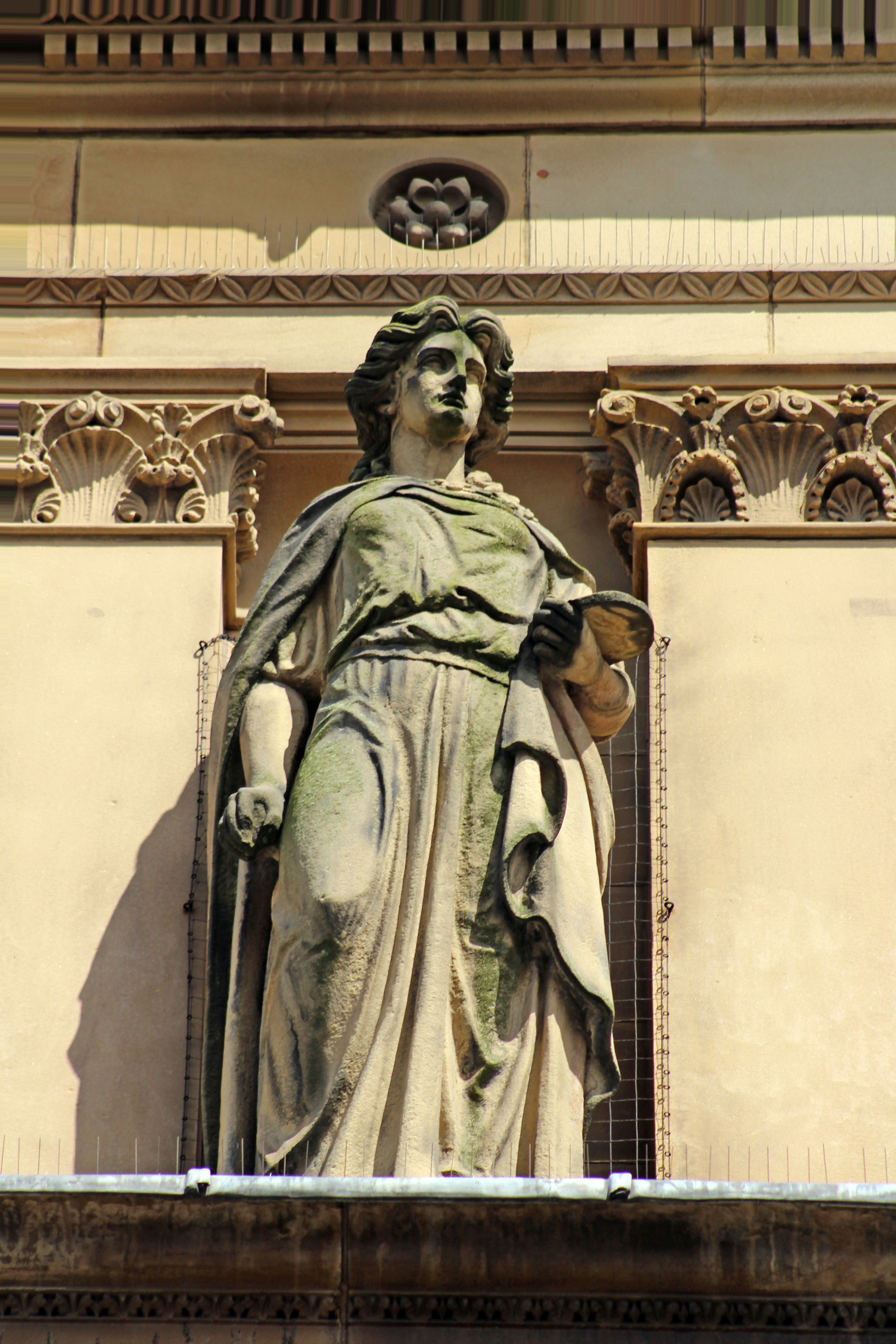
Art, Sir Thomas Street front

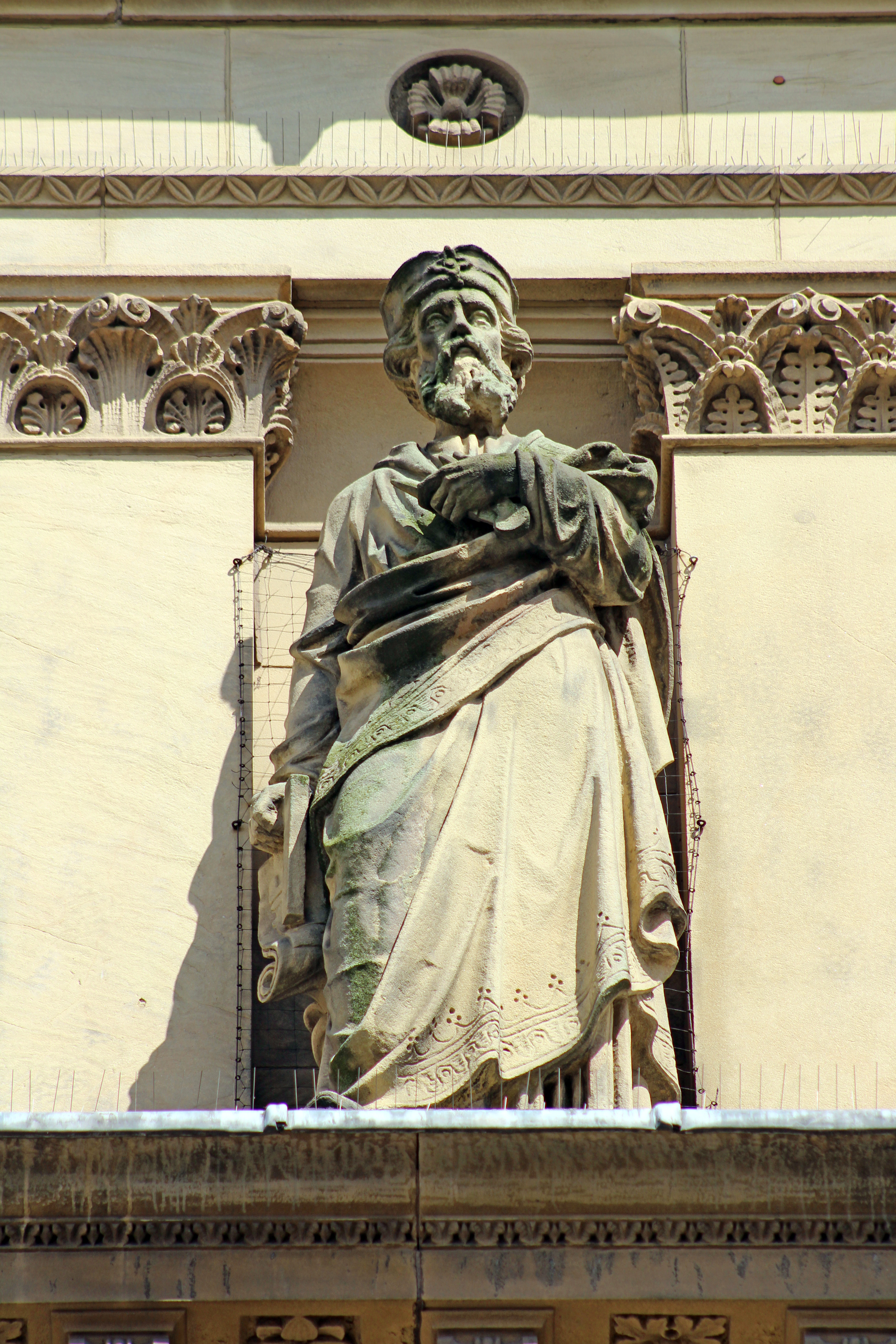
Architecture, Sir Thomas Street front

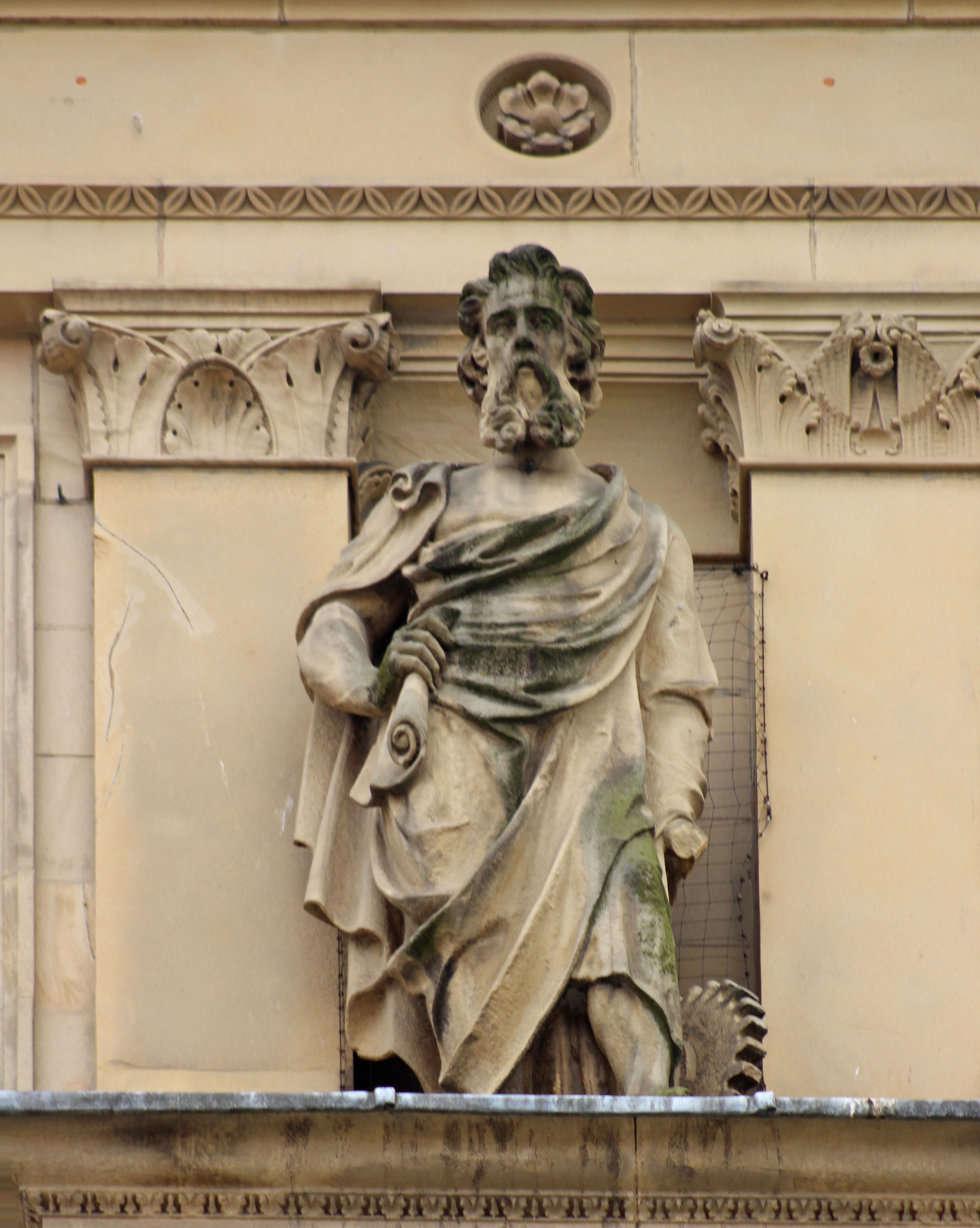
Engineering, Crosshall Street front

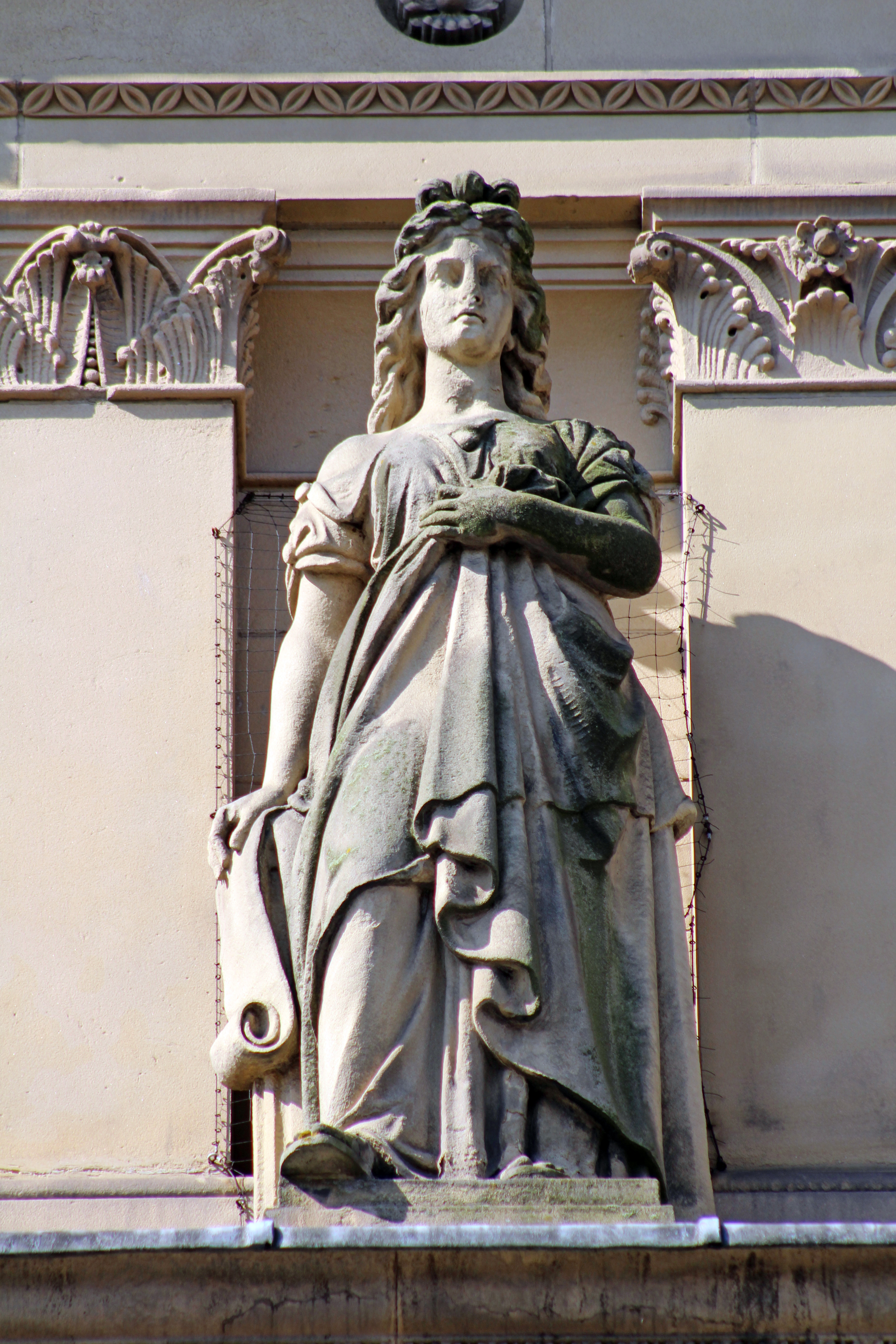
Building, Crosshall Street front

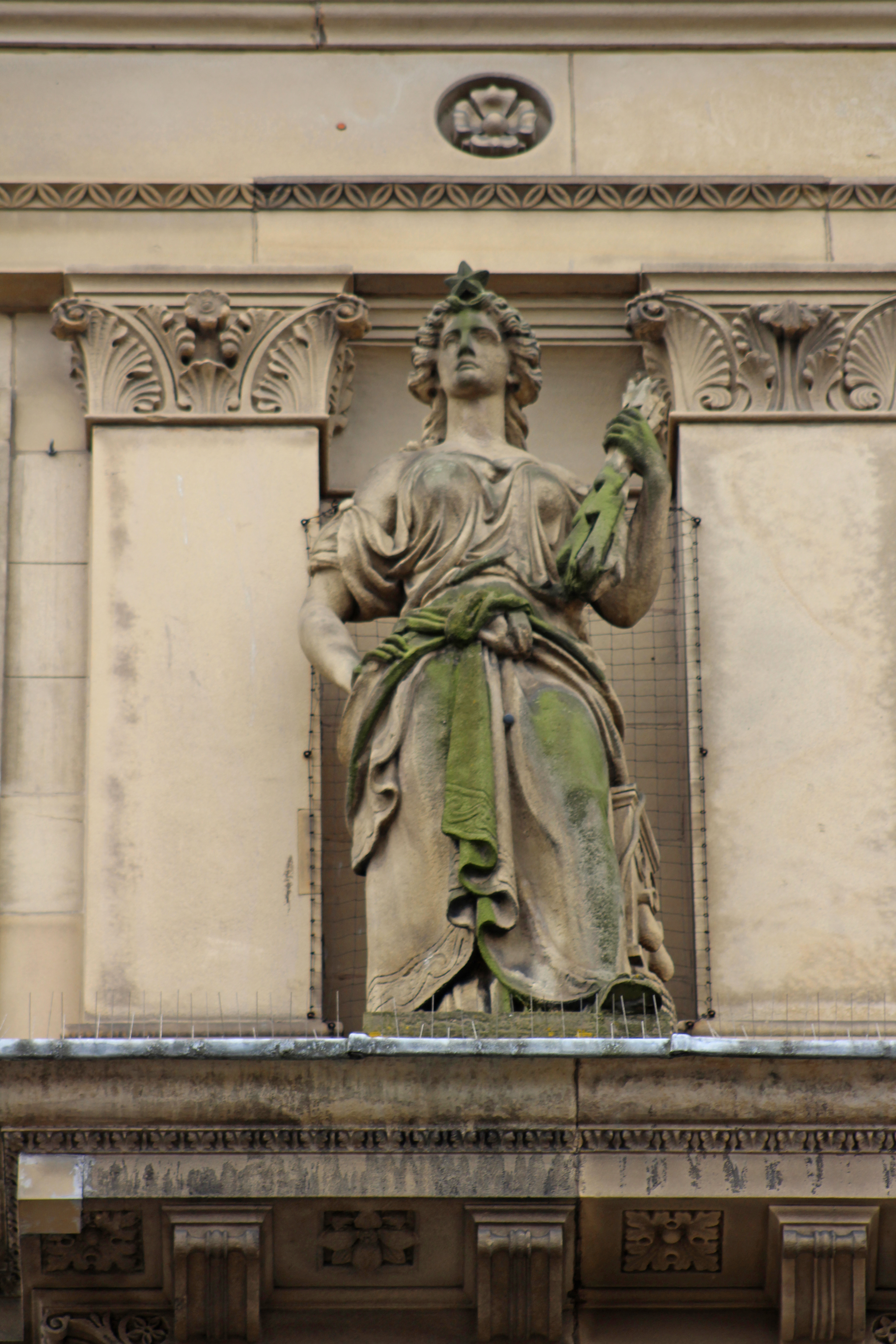
Electricity, Crosshall Street front

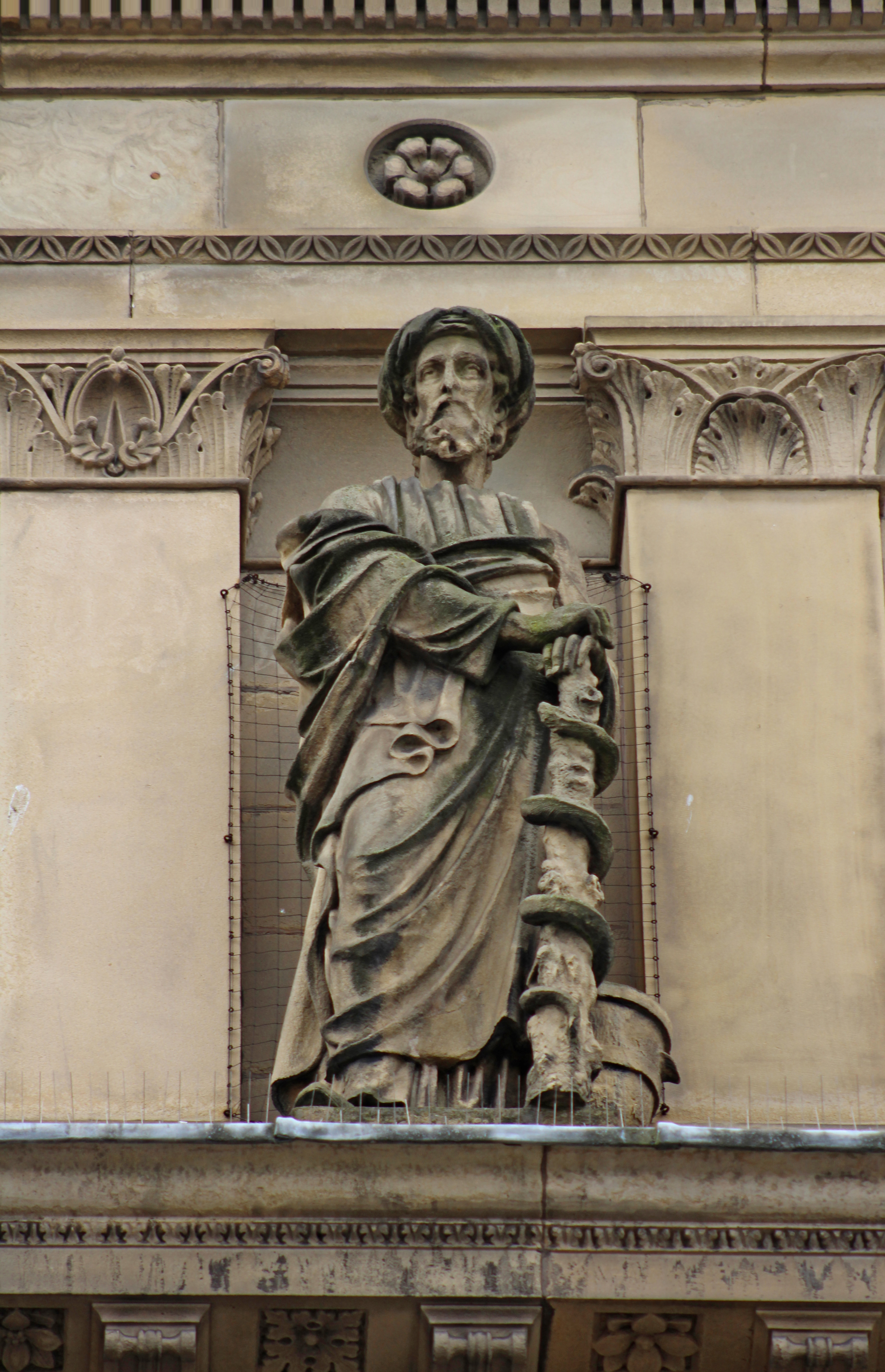
Medicine, Crosshall Street front

== See also ==
- Architecture of Liverpool
- Grade II* listed buildings in Liverpool – City Centre
- Municipal Annexe
