= Municipal Annexe =

Building in Liverpool, England

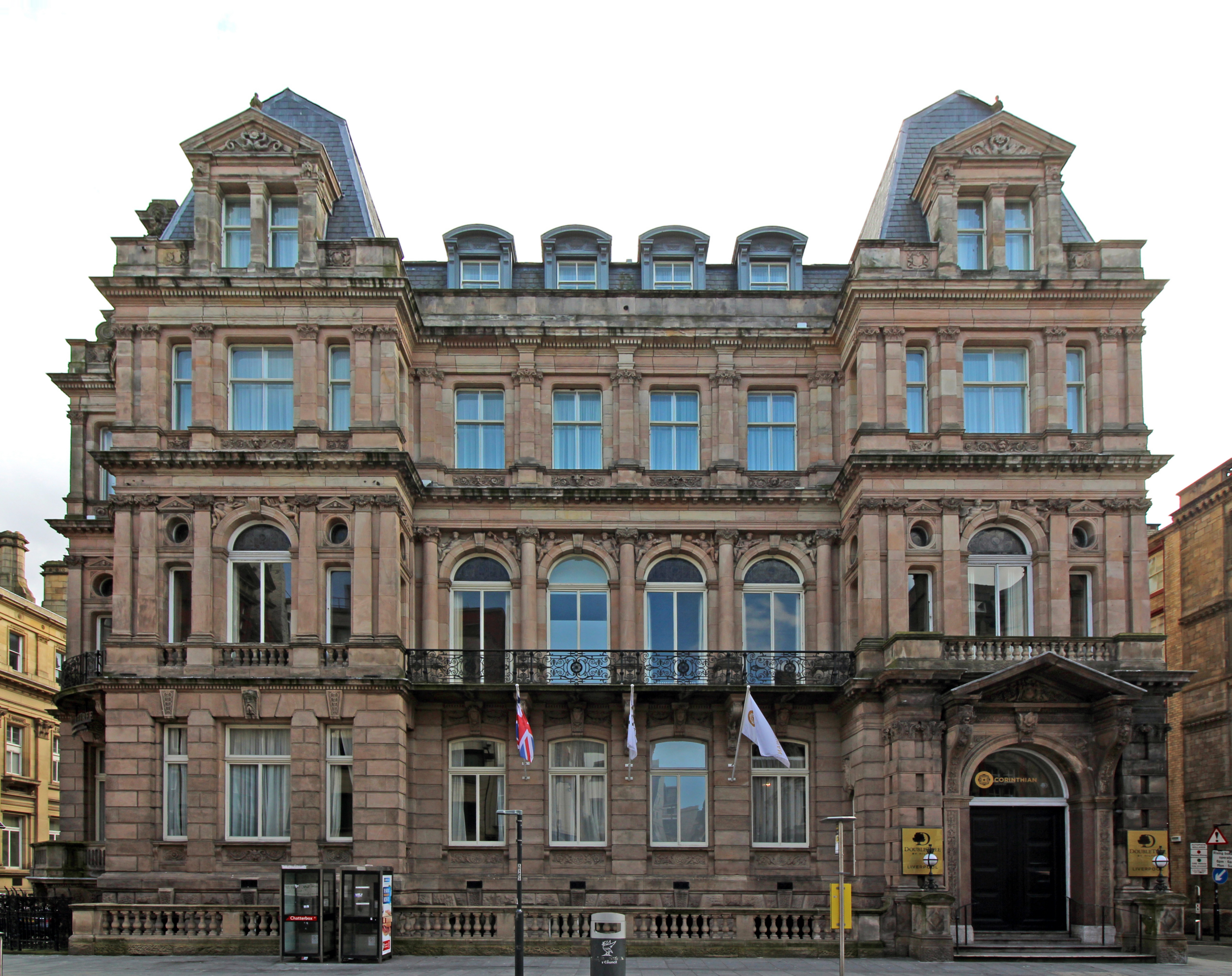
- Municipal Annexe
- Location: Liverpool, England
- Coordinates: 53.4083°N 2.9871°W
- Built: 1883
- Architect: F and G Holme
- Architectural style(s): Classical
- Governing body: Historic England

Listed Building – Grade II*
- Designated: 14 Mar 1975
- Reference no.: 1206496

The Municipal Annexe, 68 Dale Street, Liverpool is next to the Municipal Buildings, Liverpool, the former administrative headquarters of Liverpool City Council.

== History ==
It was built in 1883 to a design by F & G Holme as the base for the Conservative Club. It was later acquired by the City Council and housed the education department and several rooms used for Council Committee meetings, but was sold in the late 1990s. It was intended that the building would be linked with two other properties on St Thomas Street and turned into Liverpool's first 5-star hotel, known as the Layla. Initially planned for opening in 2006, the project was delayed and the investors, Illiad, sold their shares in the development to a Dubai-based consortium in July 2012. The new 87-room hotel opened in October 2015 branded as a DoubleTree by Hilton.

== Architecture ==
The building is three storeys tall with a basement and an attic and is built from stone with a slate mansard roof. The exterior is partially surrounded with balustrades and there is a balcony on the first floor of the building.

== See also ==
- Liverpool Town Hall
- Municipal Buildings
