= Liverpool =

City in Merseyside, England

- City and metropolitan borough
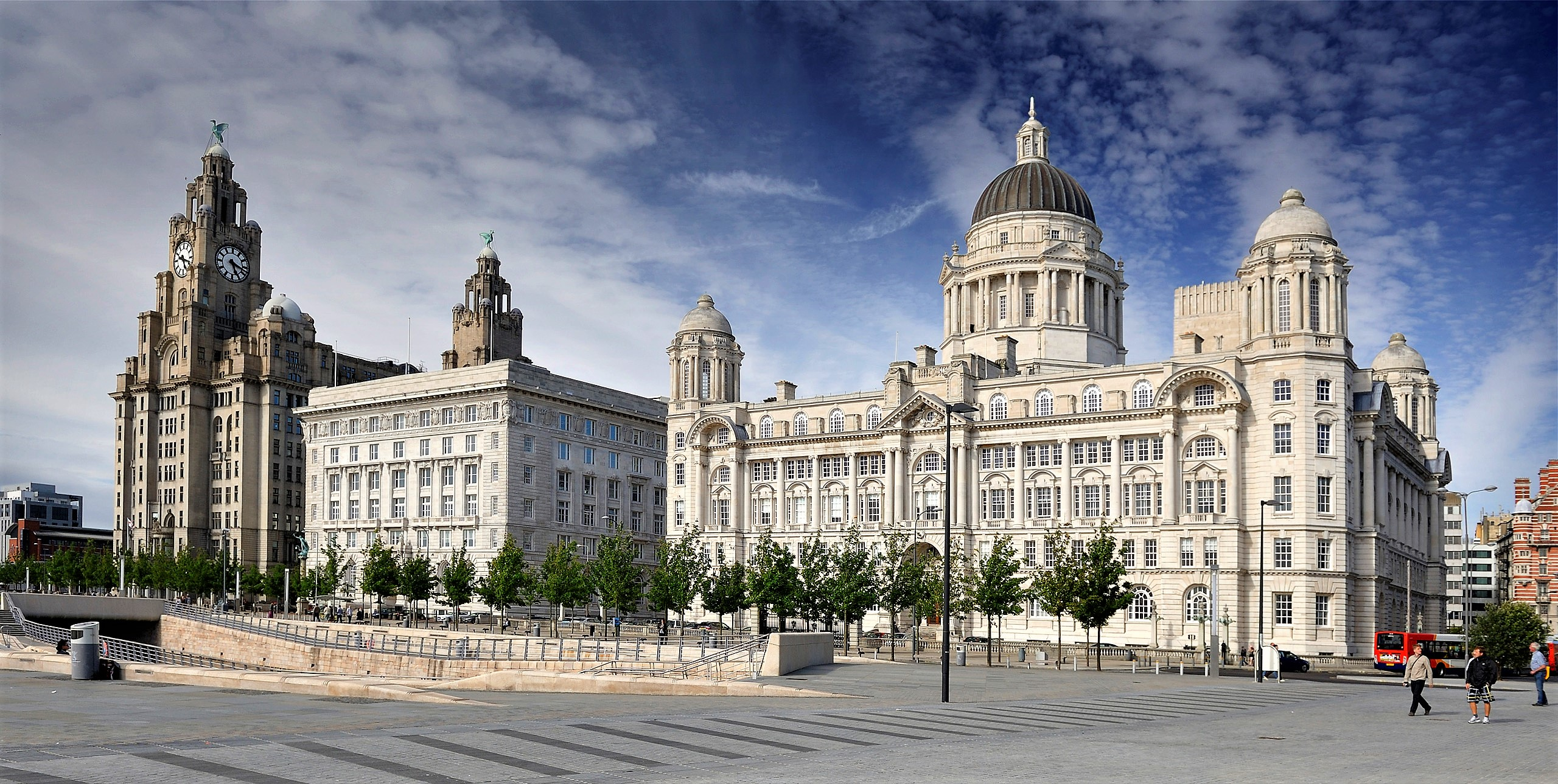
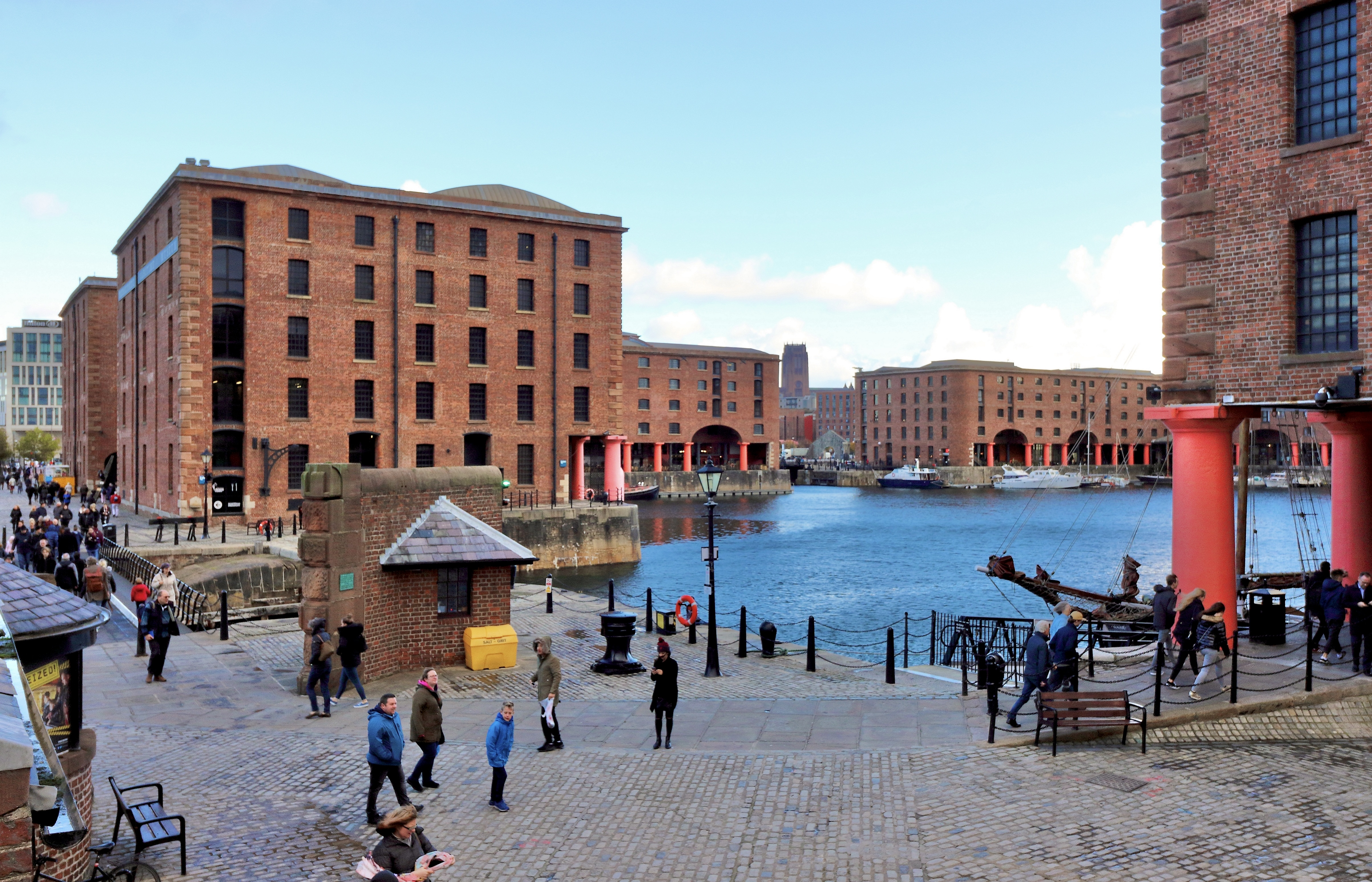
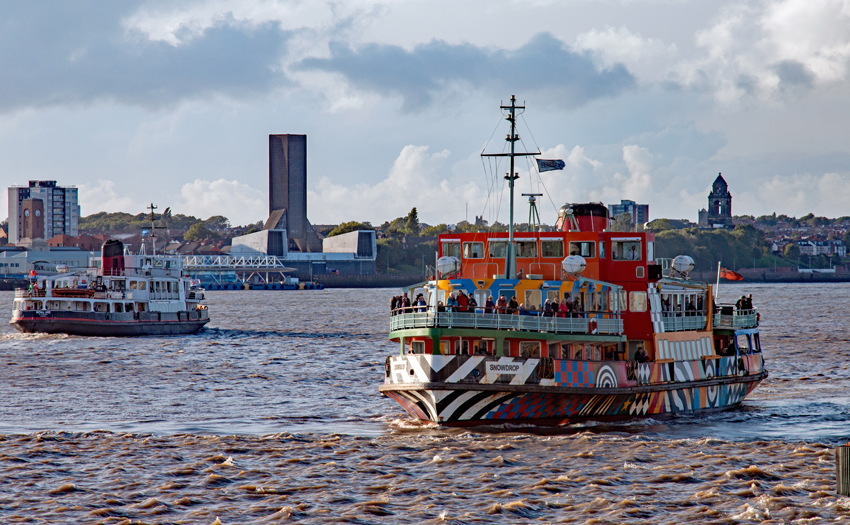
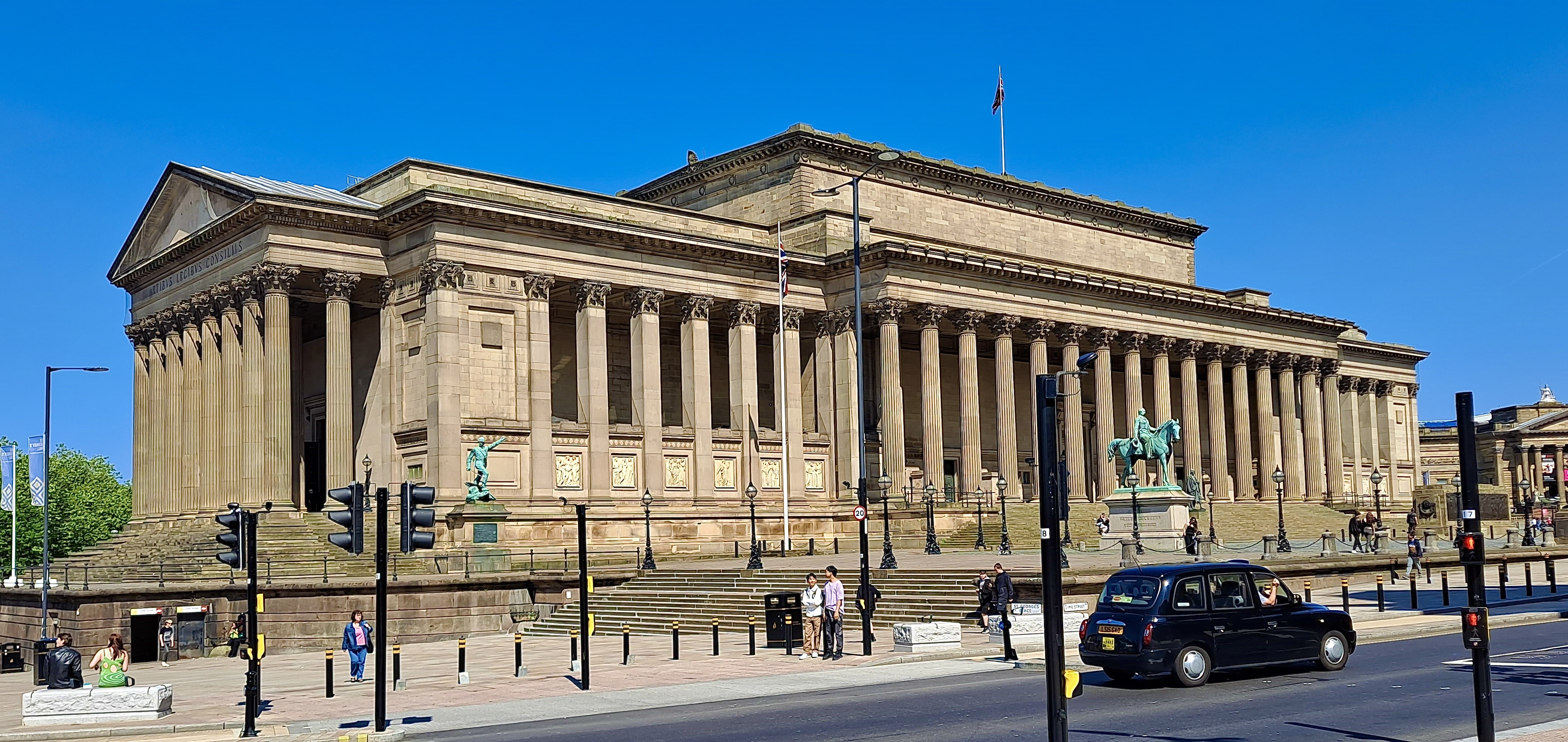
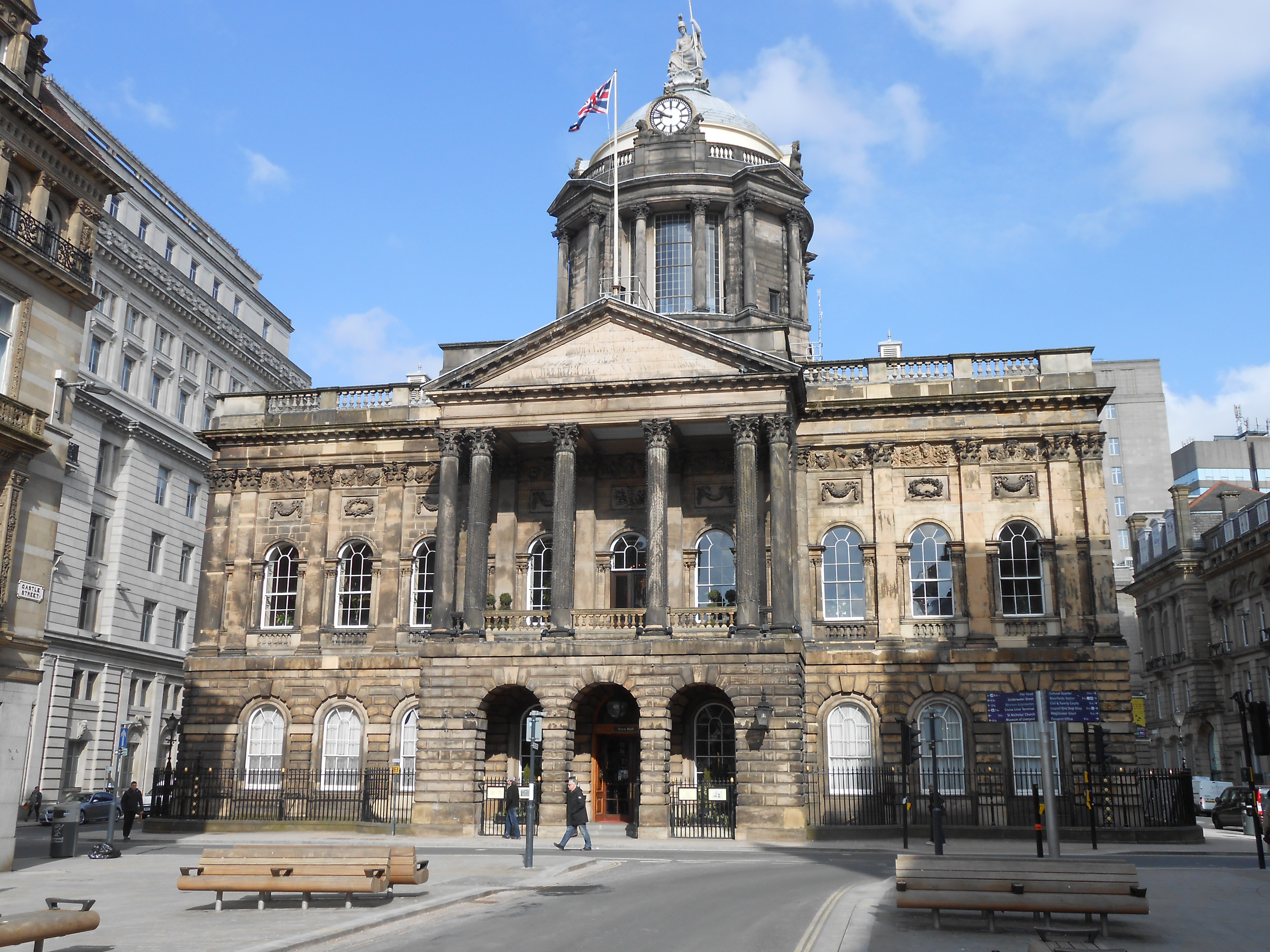
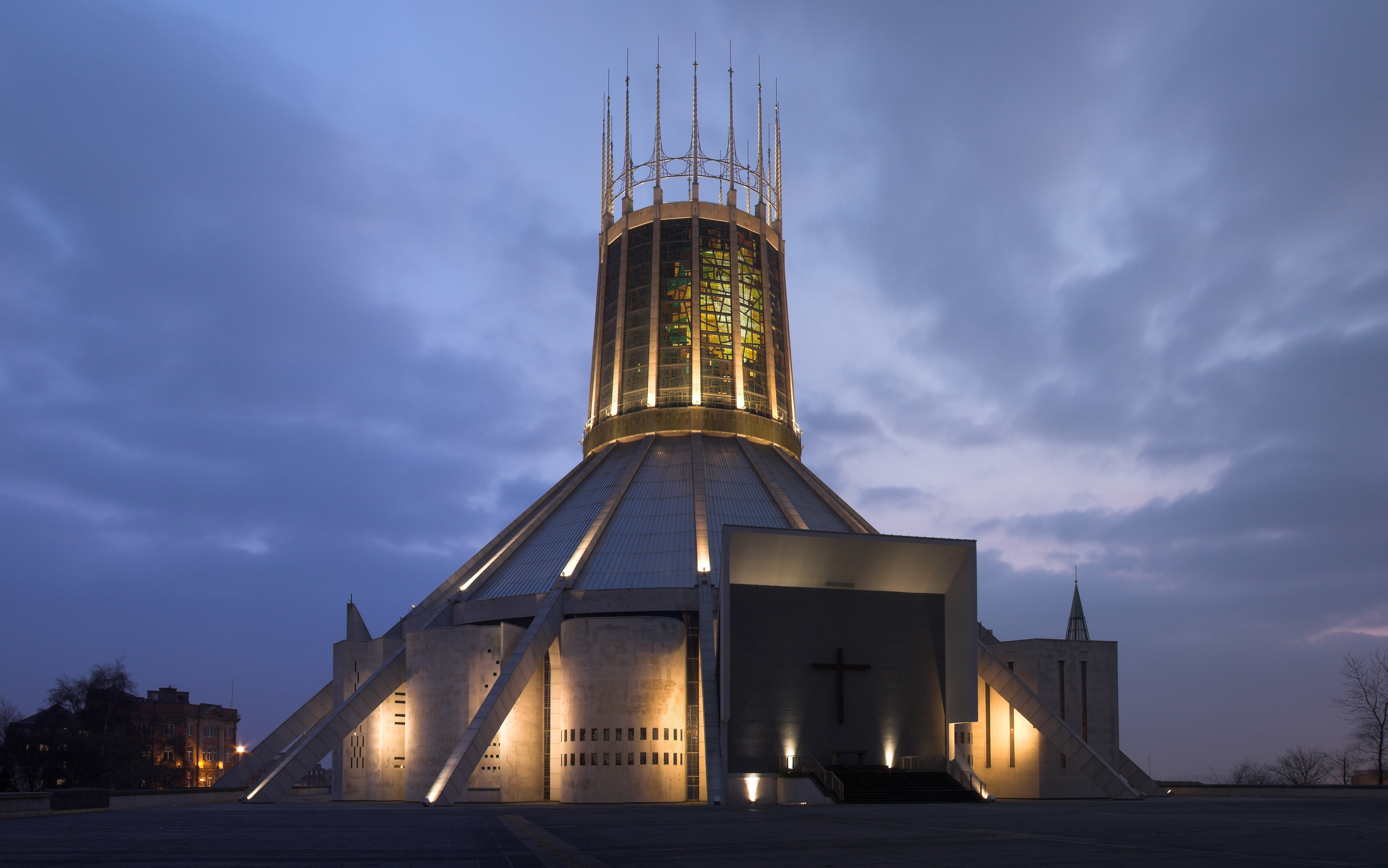
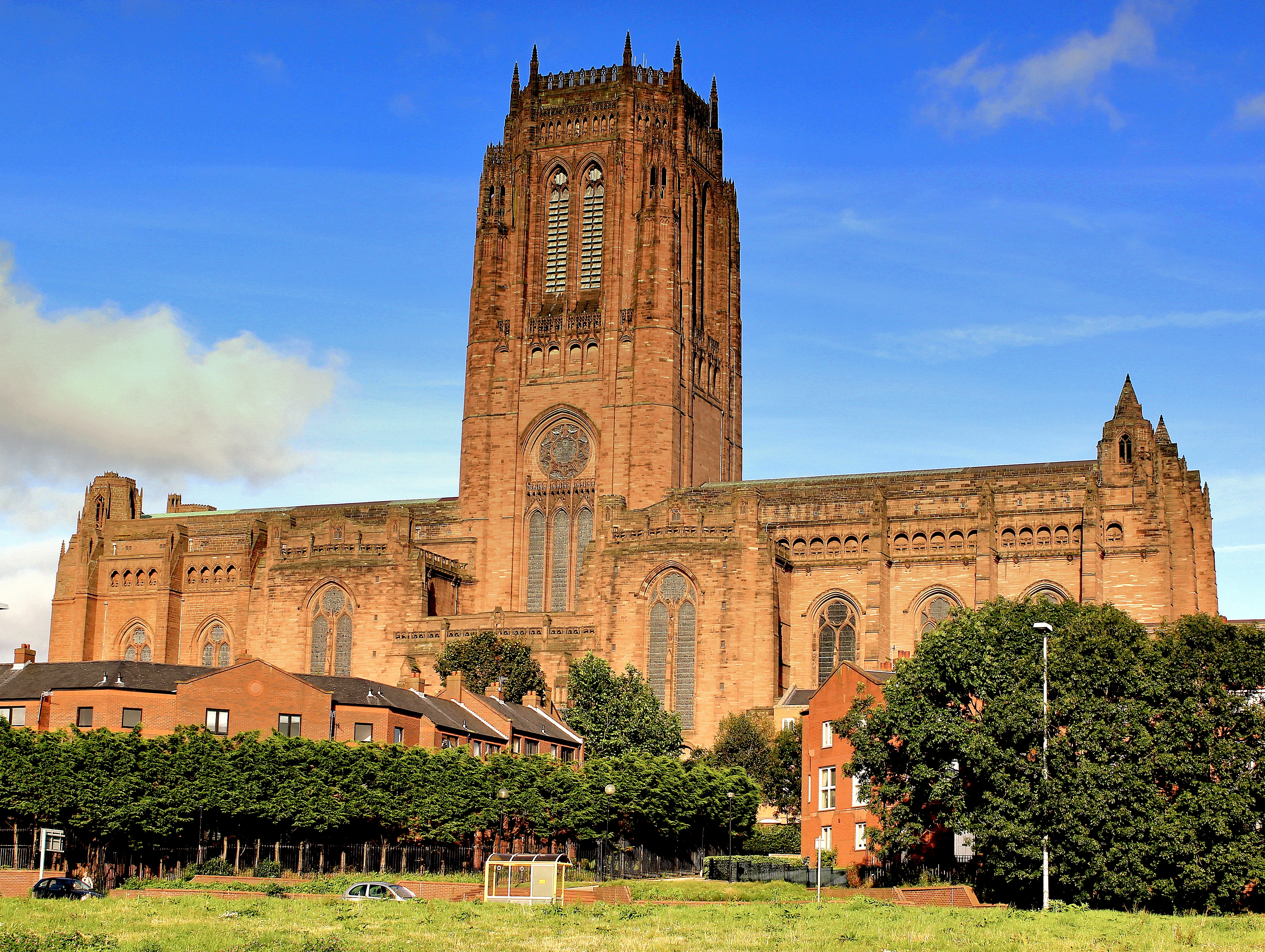
- Pier Head – the Three Graces Royal Albert Dock Mersey Ferries St George's Hall Town Hall Metropolitan Cathedral Anglican Cathedral

- Coat of arms
- Motto(s): Latin: Deus Nobis Haec Otia Fecit, lit. 'God has granted us this ease'
- Liverpool shown within Merseyside
- Coordinates: 53°24′26″N 2°59′30″W
- Sovereign state: United Kingdom
- Country: England
- Region: North West
- Ceremonial county: Merseyside
- Historic county: Lancashire
- City region: Liverpool
- Founded: 1207
- City status: 1880
- Metropolitan borough: 1 April 1974
- Administrative HQ: Cunard Building
- Districts of the city: List: Aigburth; Allerton; Anfield; Belle Vale; Broadgreen; Canning; Childwall; Chinatown; City Centre; Clubmoor; Croxteth; Dingle; Dovecot; Edge Hill; Everton; Fairfield; Fazakerley; Garston; Gateacre; Gillmoss; Grassendale; Hunt's Cross; Kensington; Kirkdale; Knotty Ash; Mossley Hill; Netherley; Norris Green; Oglet; Old Swan; Orrell Park; Sefton Park; St Michael's Hamlet; Speke; Stoneycroft; Toxteth; Tuebrook; Vauxhall; Walton; Wavertree; West Derby; Woolton

Government
  - Type: Metropolitan borough
  - Body: Liverpool City Council
  - Executive: Leader and cabinet
  - Control: Labour
  - Leader: Liam Robinson (L)
  - Lord Mayor: William Shortall
  - MPs: 5 MPs: Paula Barker (L); Ian Byrne (L); Dan Carden (L); Maria Eagle (L); Kim Johnson (L)

Area
  - Total: 134 km^{2} (52 sq mi)
  - Land: 112 km^{2} (43 sq mi)
  - Rank: 185th

Population (2025)
  - Total: 507,915
  - Rank: 12th
  - Density: 4,541/km^{2} (11,760/sq mi)
- Demonyms: Liverpudlian; Scouser (colloq.)

Ethnicity (2021)
  - Ethnic groups: List: 84.0% White; 5.7% Asian; 3.5% Black; 3.5% Mixed; 3.3% other

Religion (2021)
  - Religion: List: 57.3% Christianity; 29.4% no religion; 5.3% Islam; 0.8% Hinduism; 0.4% Buddhism; 0.4% Judaism; 0.1% Sikhism; 0.4% other; 5.9% not stated
- Time zone: UTC+0 (GMT)
  - Summer (DST): UTC+1 (BST)
- Postcode area: L
- Dialling code: 0151
- ISO 3166 code: GB-LIV
- GSS code: E08000012
- Website: liverpool.gov.uk

Liverpool is a port city and metropolitan borough in Merseyside, England. It is situated on the eastern side of the Mersey Estuary, near the Irish Sea, 178 miles (286 km) north-west of London. It had an estimated population of 507,915 in 2025. The city is within the larger Liverpool City Region, a combined authority area with a population of over 1.5 million.

Established as a borough in Lancashire in 1207, Liverpool became significant in the late 17th century when the Port of Liverpool was heavily involved in the Atlantic slave trade. The port also imported cotton for the Lancashire textile mills, and became a major departure point for English and Irish emigrants to North America. Liverpool rose to global economic importance at the forefront of the Industrial Revolution in the 19th century and was home to the first inter-city railway, the first non-combustible warehouse system (the Royal Albert Dock), and a pioneering elevated electrical railway; it was granted city status in 1880 and was moved from Lancashire to the newly created county of Merseyside in 1974. It entered a period of decline in the mid-20th century, which was largely reversed after the European Union selected it as the European Capital of Culture for 2008, (Note: Shared with Stavanger in Norway.) reportedly generating over £800 million for the local economy within a year.

The economy of Liverpool is diverse and encompasses tourism, culture, maritime, hospitality, healthcare, life sciences, advanced manufacturing, creative and digital sectors. The city is home to the UK's second highest number of art galleries, national museums, listed buildings, and parks and open spaces, behind only London. It is often used as a filming location due to its architecture and was the fifth most visited UK city by foreign tourists in 2022. It has produced numerous musicians, most notably the Beatles, and recording artists from the city have had more UK No. 1 singles than anywhere else in the world. It has also produced numerous academics, actors, artists, comedians, filmmakers, poets, scientists, sportspeople, and writers. It is the home of Premier League football teams Everton and Liverpool. The world's oldest still-operating main line railway station, Liverpool Lime Street, is in the city centre; it is also served by the underground Merseyrail network. The city's port was the fourth largest in the UK in 2023, with numerous shipping and freight lines having headquarters and offices there.

Residents of Liverpool are formally known as Liverpudlians but are more often called Scousers in reference to scouse, a local stew made popular by sailors. The city's distinct local accent is also primarily known as Scouse. Its cultural and ethnic diversity is the result of attracting immigrants from various areas, particularly Ireland, Scandinavia, and Wales; it is also home to the UK's oldest black community and Europe's oldest Chinese community, as well as the first mosque in England.

== Toponymy ==
The name comes from the Old English lifer, meaning thick or muddy water, and pōl, meaning a pool or creek, and is first recorded around 1190 as Liuerpul. According to the Cambridge Dictionary of English Place-Names, "The original reference was to a pool or tidal creek now filled up into which two streams drained". Other origins of the name have been suggested, including "elverpool", a reference to the large number of eels in the Mersey. The adjective "Liverpudlian" was first recorded in 1833.

== History ==
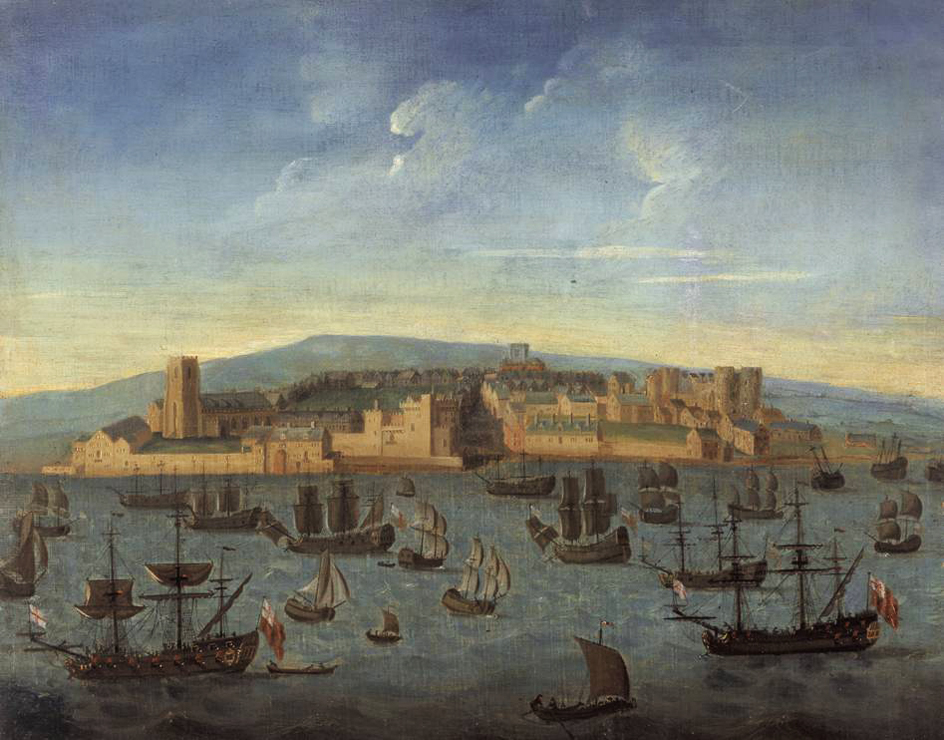
The earliest-known image of Liverpool, in 1680

A map of Liverpool's original seven streets (north to the left)

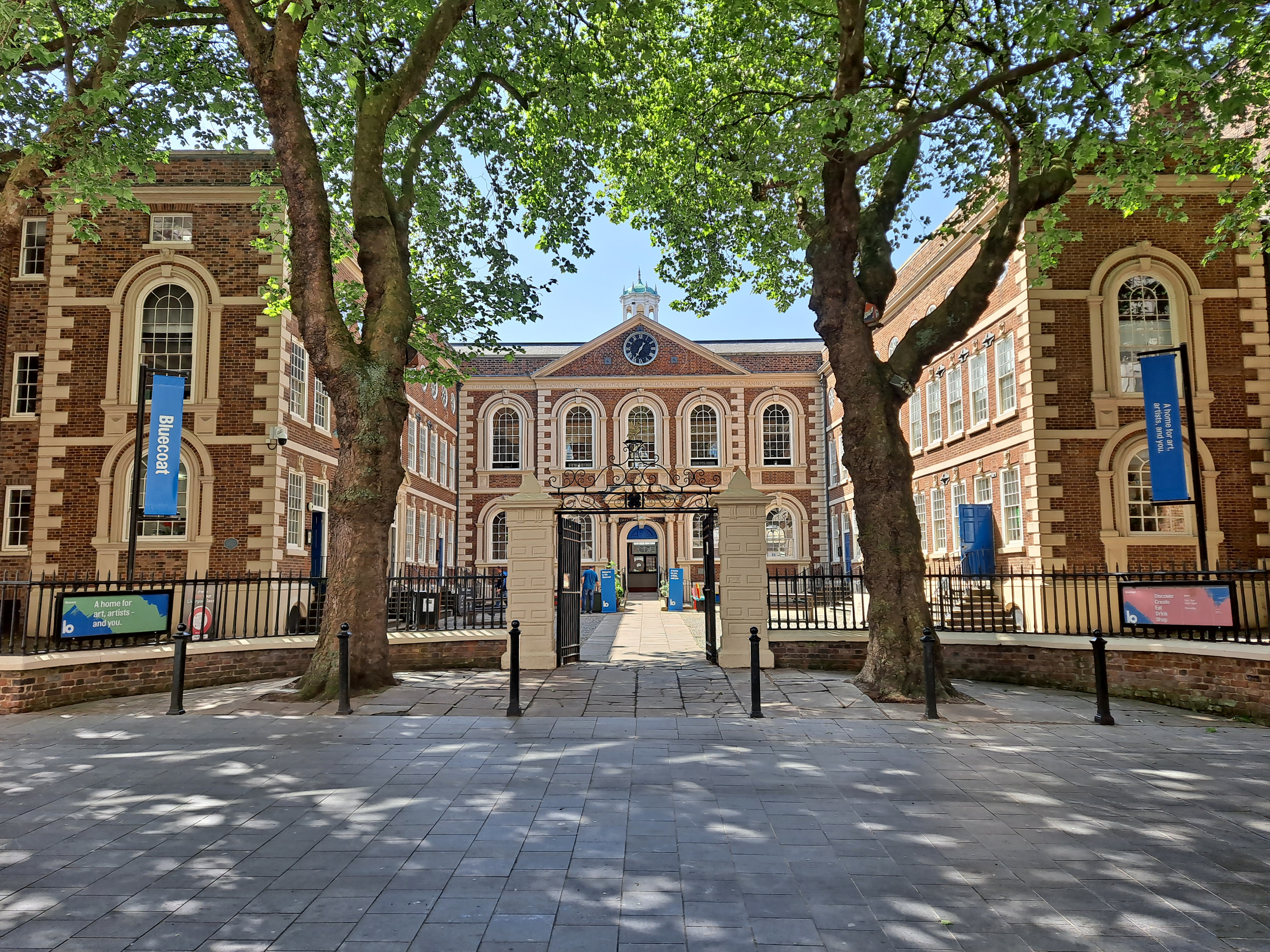
Bluecoat Chambers, completed in 1725, the oldest surviving building in Liverpool city centre

=== Early history ===
In the Middle Ages, Liverpool first existed as farmland within the West Derby Hundred before growing into a small town of farmers, fishermen and tradesmen and tactical army base for King John of England. A tidal creek, known as the Pool provided a natural harbour for ships. The town was planned with its own castle, although due to outbreaks of disease and its subordinance to the nearby Roman port of Chester, the town's growth and prosperity stagnated until the late 17th and early 18th centuries. There was substantial growth in the mid- to late 18th century, when the town became the European port most heavily involved in the Atlantic slave trade.

King John's letters patent of 1207 announced the foundation of the borough of Liverpool (then spelt as Liuerpul). There is no evidence that the place had previously been a centre of any trade. The borough was probably created because King John decided that it would be a convenient place to embark men and supplies for his Irish campaigns: in particular his Irish campaign of 1209. The original street plan of Liverpool is said to have been designed by King John near the same time it was granted a royal charter, making it a borough. The original seven streets were laid out in the shape of a double cross: Bank Street (now Water Street), Castle Street, Chapel Street, Dale Street, Juggler Street (now High Street), Moor Street (now Tithebarn Street) and Whiteacre Street (now Old Hall Street). Liverpool Castle was built before 1235, and survived until it was demolished in the 1720s. By the middle of the 16th century, the population was still around 600, although this was likely to have fallen from an earlier peak of 1,000 people due to slow trade and the effects of the plague.

In the 17th century, there was slow progress in trade and population growth. Battles for control of the town were waged during the English Civil War, including a brief siege in 1644. In 1699, the same year as its first recorded slave ship, Liverpool Merchant, set sail for Africa, Liverpool was made a parish by Act of Parliament. But arguably, the legislation of 1695 that reformed the Liverpool council was of more significance to its subsequent development. Since Roman times nearby Chester on the River Dee had been the region's principal port on the Irish Sea. However, as the Dee began to silt up, maritime trade from Chester became increasingly difficult and shifted towards Liverpool on the neighbouring River Mersey. The first of the Liverpool docks was constructed in 1715, and the system of docks gradually grew into a large interconnected system.

As trade from the West Indies, including sugar, surpassed that of Ireland and Europe, and as the River Dee continued to silt up, Liverpool began to grow even faster. The first commercial wet dock was built in Liverpool in 1715. Substantial profits from the slave trade and tobacco helped the town to prosper and rapidly grow, although several prominent local men, including William Rathbone, William Roscoe and Edward Rushton, were at the forefront of the local abolitionist movement.

=== 19th century ===
Inaugural journey of the Liverpool and Manchester Railway in 1830

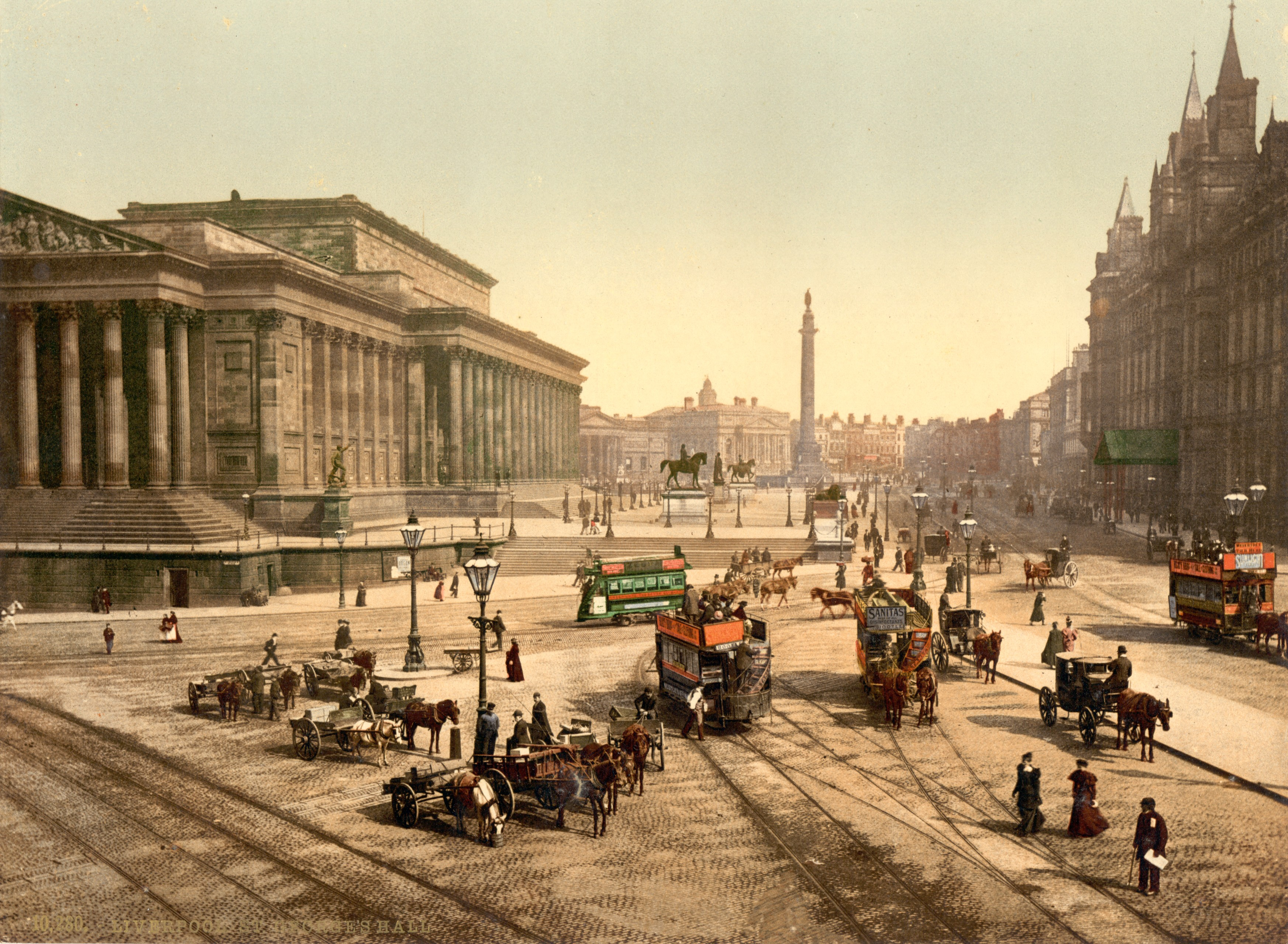
Lime Street, Liverpool, in the 1890s, St.George's Hall to the left, Great North Western Hotel to the right, Walker Art Gallery and Sessions House in the background. Statues of Prince Albert, Disraeli, Queen Victoria and Wellington's Column in the middle ground.

The 19th century saw Liverpool rise to global economic importance. Pioneering arose, and world-first technology and civic facilities launched in the city to serve the accelerating population, one that was fuelled by an influx of ethnic and religious communities from all around the world.

By the start of the 19th century, a large volume of trade was passing through Liverpool, and the construction of major buildings reflected this wealth. In 1830, Liverpool and Manchester became the first cities to have an intercity rail link, through the Liverpool and Manchester Railway. The population continued to rise rapidly, especially during the 1840s when Irish migrants began arriving by the hundreds of thousands as a result of the Great Famine. While many Irish people settled in the city at that time, a large percentage also emigrated to the United States or moved to the industrial centres of Lancashire, Yorkshire, and the Midlands.

In her poetical illustration "Liverpool" (1832), which celebrates the city's worldwide commerce, Letitia Elizabeth Landon refers specifically to the Macgregor Laird expedition to the Niger River, at that time in progress. This is accompanied by a painting by Samuel Austin, Liverpool, from the Mersey.

Britain was a major market for cotton imported from the Deep South of the United States, which fed the textile industry in the country. Given the crucial place cotton held in the city's economy, during the American Civil War Liverpool was, in the words of historian Sven Beckert, "the most pro-Confederate place in the world outside the Confederacy itself". Liverpool merchants helped to bring out cotton from ports blockaded by the Union Navy, built ships of war for the Confederacy, and supplied the South with military equipment and credit.

During the war, the Confederate Navy ship, the CSS Alabama, was built at Birkenhead on the Mersey, and the CSS Shenandoah surrendered there (being the final surrender at the end of the war). The city was also the centre of Confederate purchases of war materiel, including arms and ammunition, uniforms, and naval supplies to be smuggled by British blockade runners to the South.

For periods during the 19th century, the wealth of Liverpool exceeded that of London, and Liverpool's Custom House was the single largest contributor to the British Exchequer. Liverpool was the only British city ever to have its own Whitehall office. During this century, at least 40% of the world's entire trade passed through Liverpool.

In the early 19th century, Liverpool played a major role in the Antarctic sealing industry, in recognition of which Liverpool Beach in the South Shetland Islands is named after the city.

As early as 1851, the city was described as "the New York of Europe". During the late 19th and early 20th centuries, Liverpool was attracting immigrants from across Europe. This resulted in the construction of a diverse array of religious buildings in the city for the new ethnic and religious groups, many of which are still in use today. The Deutsche Kirche, Greek Orthodox Church of St Nicholas, Gustav Adolf Church and Princes Road Synagogue were all established in the 1800s to serve Liverpool's growing German, Greek, Nordic and Jewish communities, respectively. One of Liverpool's oldest surviving churches, St. Peter's Roman Catholic Church, served the Polish community in its final years as a place of worship.

=== 20th century ===
The 20th century saw Liverpool's established rank as a global economic powerhouse challenged. Its strategic location as an international seaport made it particularly vulnerable in two World wars. Economic depressions (both in the United Kingdom and across the world), changing housing patterns and containerisation in the maritime industry contributed to a downtrend in the city's productivity and prosperity. Despite this, the city's influence on global popular culture excelled and by the end of the century, the continuing process of urban renewal paved the way for the redefined modern city of the 21st century.

The period after the Great War was marked by social unrest, as society grappled with the massive war losses of young men, as well as trying to re-integrate veterans into civilian life and the economy. Unemployment and poor living standards greeted many ex-servicemen. Union organising and strikes took place in numerous locations, including a police strike in Liverpool among the City Police. Numerous colonial soldiers and sailors from Africa and India, who had served with the British Armed Forces, settled in Liverpool and other port cities. In June 1919, they were subject to attack by whites in racial riots; residents in the port included Swedish immigrants, and both groups had to compete with native people from Liverpool for jobs and housing. In this period, race riots also took place in other port cities.

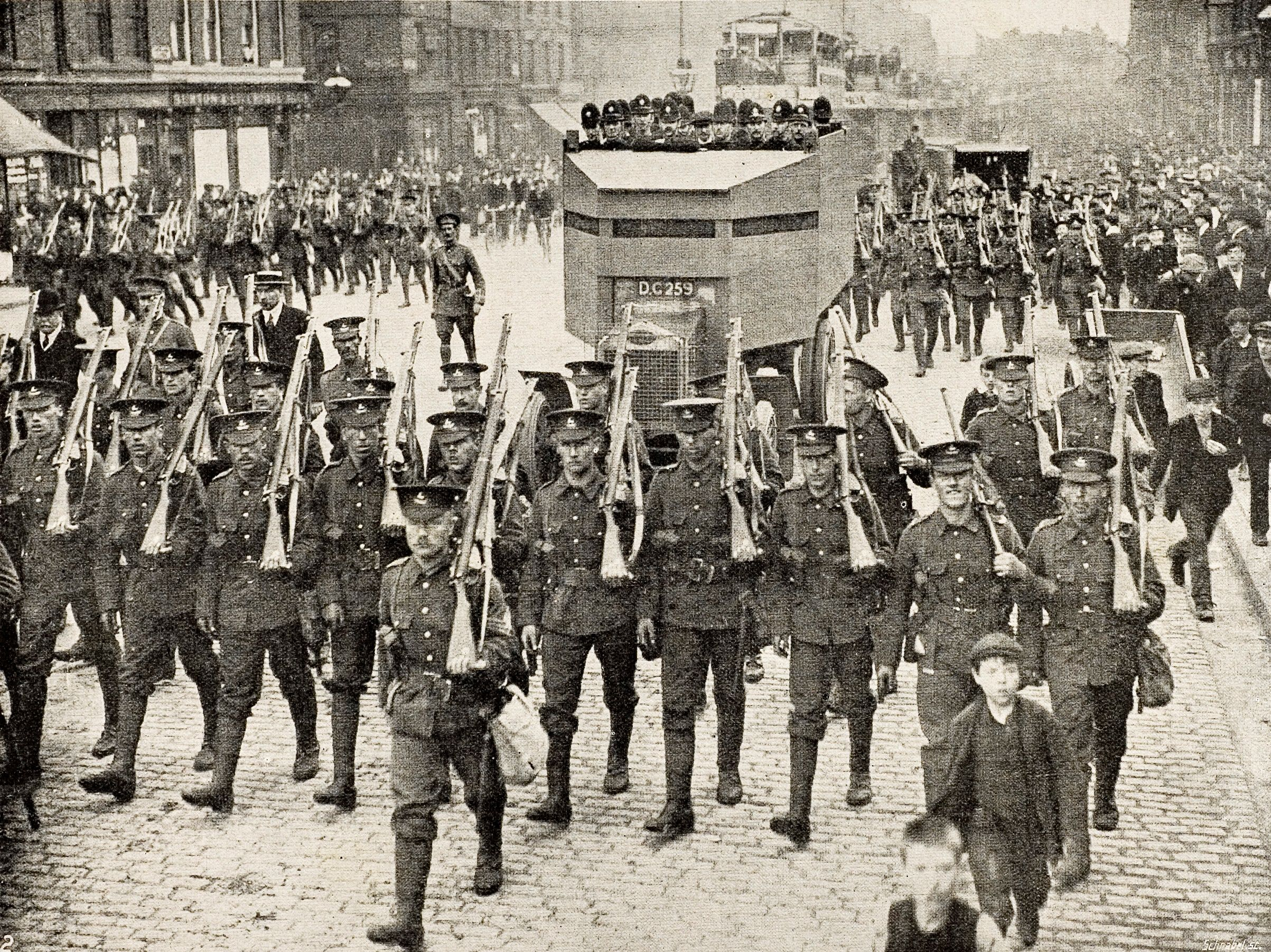
Soldiers escorting a police transport through Liverpool during the National railway strike of 1911

The Housing, Town Planning, &c. Act 1919 resulted in mass council housing being built across Liverpool during the 1920s and 1930s. In the 1920s and 1930s, as much as 15% of the city's population (around 140,000 people) was relocated from the inner-city to new purpose built, lower density suburban housing estates, based on the belief that this would improve their standard of living, though the overall benefits have been contested. Numerous private homes were also built during this era. During the Great Depression of the early 1930s, unemployment peaked at around 30% in the city. Liverpool was the site of Britain's first provincial airport, operating from 1930.

During the Second World War, the critical strategic importance of Liverpool was recognised by both Hitler and Churchill. The city was heavily bombed by the Germans, suffering a blitz second only to London's. The pivotal Battle of the Atlantic was planned, fought and won from Liverpool.

Soldiers waving goodbye on board the troopship MV Georgic as she leaves Liverpool for the Middle East, circa July 1945

The Luftwaffe made 80 air raids on Merseyside, killing 2,500 people and causing damage to almost half the homes in the metropolitan area. Significant rebuilding followed the war, including massive housing estates and the Seaforth Dock, the largest dock project in Britain. Since 1952, Liverpool has been twinned with Cologne, Germany, a city that also suffered severe aerial bombing during the war. In the 1950s and 1960s, much of the immediate reconstruction that took place in the city centre proved to be deeply unpopular. The historic portions of the city that had survived German bombing suffered extensive destruction during urban renewal. It has been argued that the so-called "Shankland Plan" of the 1960s, named after the town planner Graeme Shankland, led to compromised town planning and vast road-building schemes that devastated and divided inner city neighbourhoods. Concrete brutalist architecture, compromised visions, botched projects and grand designs that were never realised became the subject of condemnation. Historian Raphael Samuel labelled Graeme Shankland "the butcher of Liverpool".

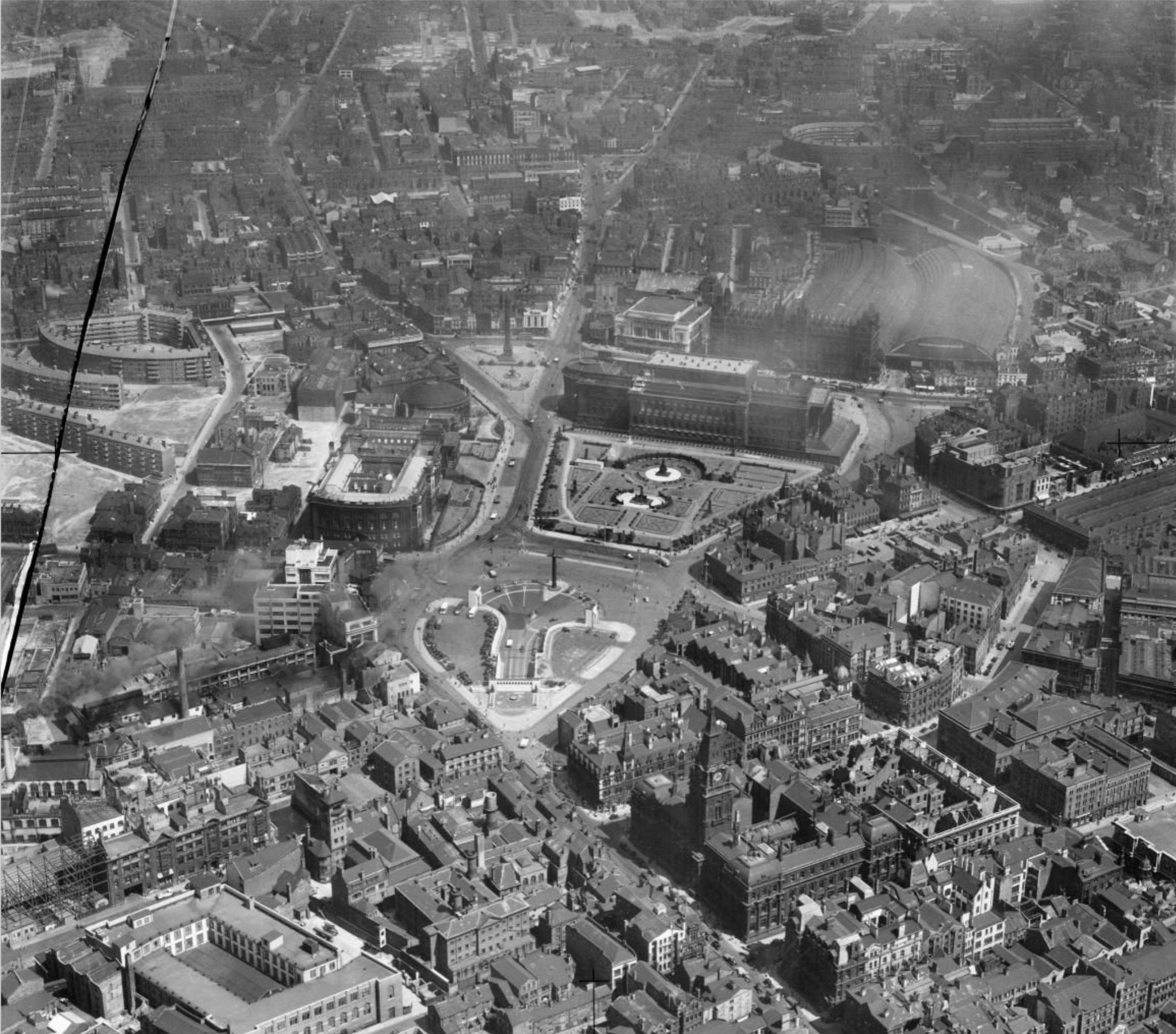
Liverpool's Lime Street area pictured from above in 1946

A West Indian black community has existed in the city since the first two decades of the 20th century. Like most British cities and industrialised towns, Liverpool became home to Commonwealth immigrants, beginning after World War I with colonial soldiers and sailors who had served in the area. More immigrants arrived after World War II, mostly settling in older inner-city areas such as Toxteth, where housing was less expensive. The black population of Liverpool was recorded at 1.90% in 2011. In the 2021 Census, 5.2% described themselves as black African, Caribbean, mixed white and black African, mixed white and Caribbean or 'other black'.

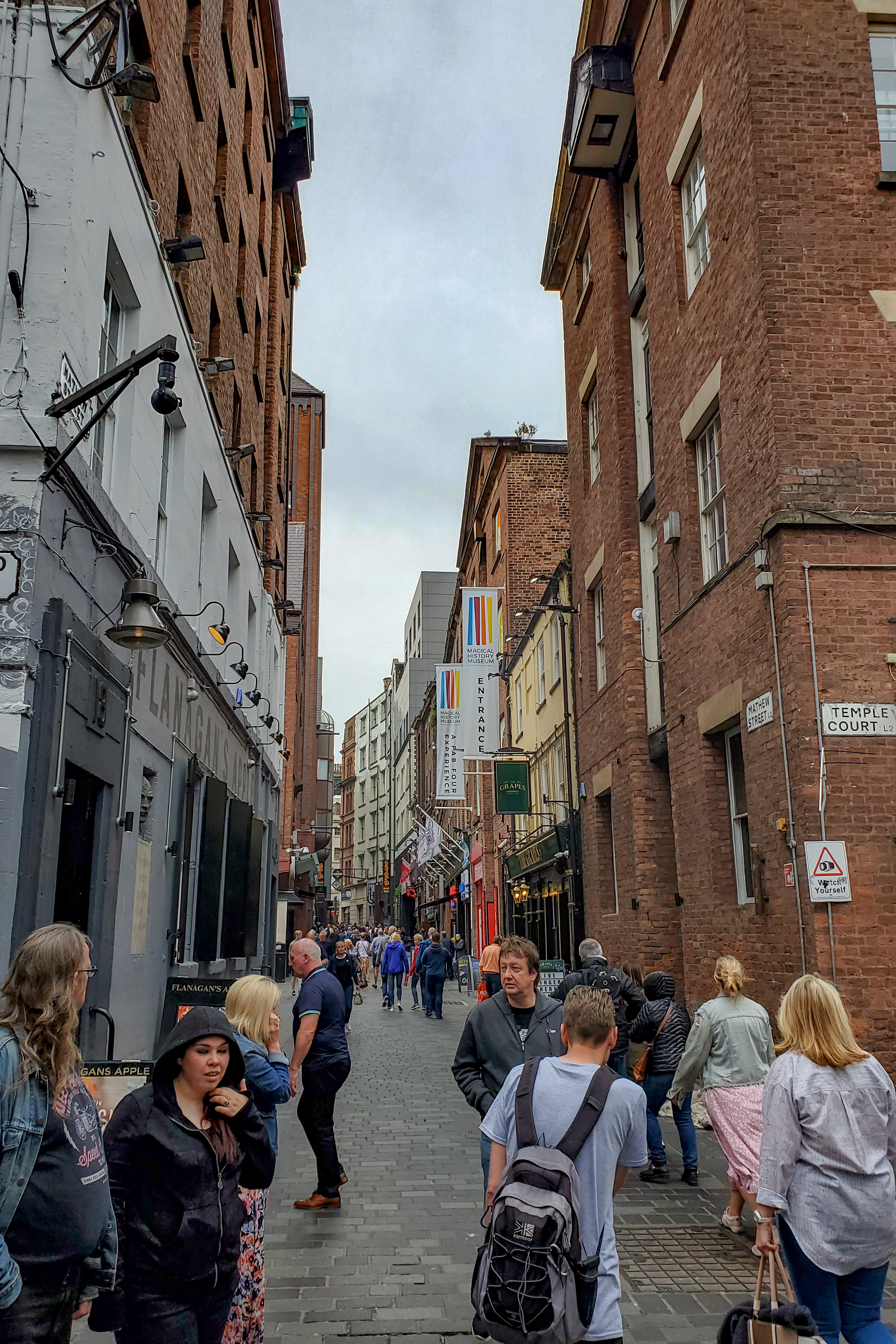
Mathew Street is one of many tourist attractions related to the Beatles, and the location of The Cavern Club and Liverpool Wall of Fame.

In the 1960s, Liverpool was the centre of the "Merseybeat" sound whose best-known band is the Beatles. Liverpool Airport was renamed after Beatle and Liverpudlian John Lennon in 2002, the first British airport to be named in honour of an individual.

Previously part of Lancashire, and a county borough from 1889, Liverpool became a metropolitan borough within the newly created metropolitan county of Merseyside, in 1974. From the mid-1970s onwards, Liverpool's docks and traditional manufacturing industries declined due to restructuring of shipping and heavy industry, causing massive losses of jobs. The advent of containerisation meant that the city's docks became largely obsolete, and dock workers were made unemployed. By the early 1980s, unemployment rates in Liverpool were among the highest in the UK, standing at 17% by January 1982 although, this was about half the level of unemployment that had affected the city during the Great Depression some 50 years previously. During this period, Liverpool became a hub of fierce left-wing opposition to the central government in London. Liverpool in the 1980s has been labelled as Britain's 'shock city'. Once the acclaimed second city of the British Empire which rivalled the capital city in global significance, Liverpool had collapsed in to its 'nadir' at the depths of post-colonial, post-industrial Britain. In the late 20th century, Liverpool's economy began to recover. The late 1980s saw the opening of a regenerated Albert Dock which proved to be a catalyst for further regeneration. In the mid-1990s, the city enjoyed growth rates higher than the national average. At the end of the 20th century, Liverpool was concentrating on regeneration, a process that continues today.

=== 21st century ===
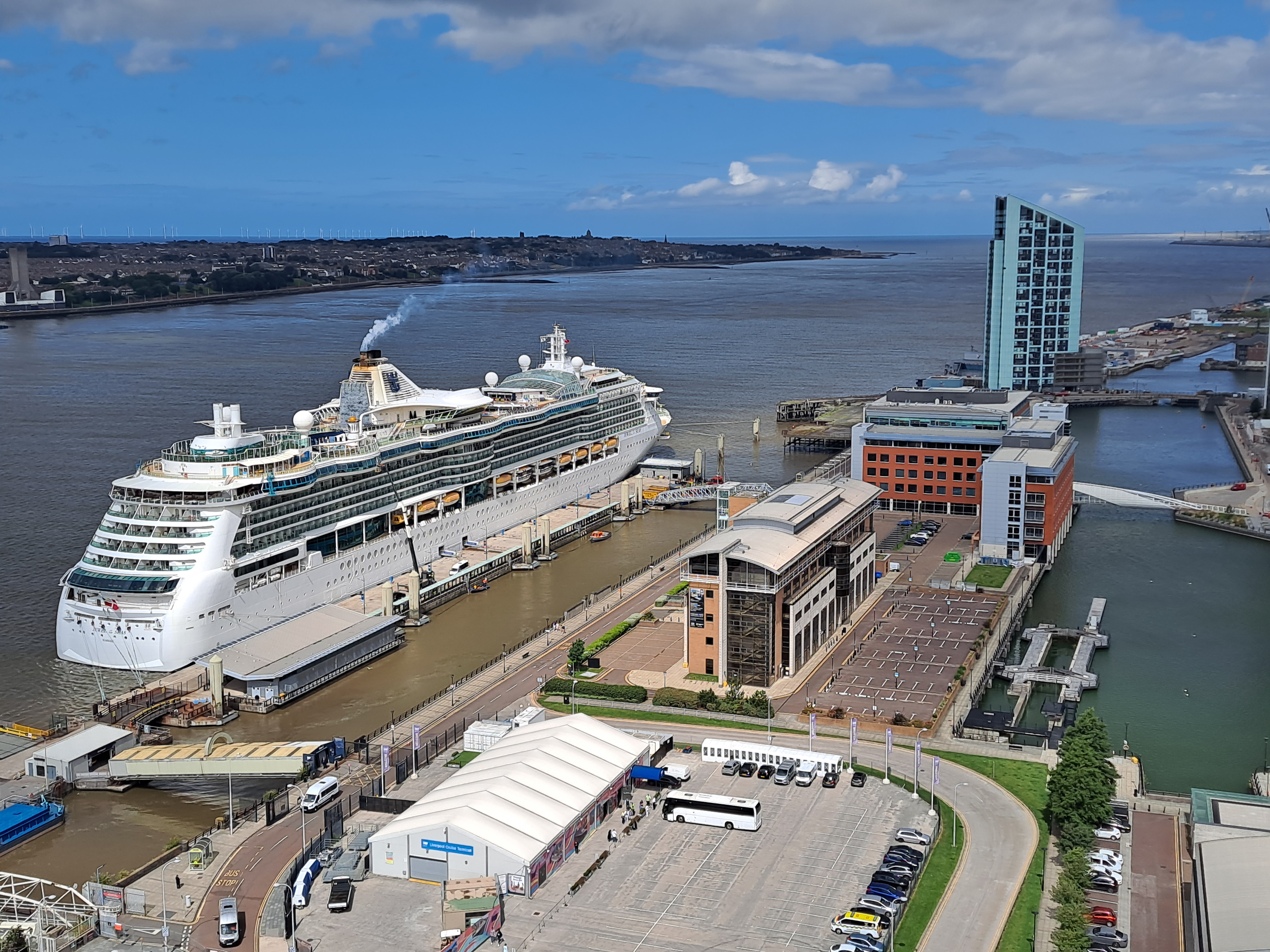
The Liverpool Cruise Terminal and surrounding office and residential developments, part of the Liverpool Waters megaproject

Ongoing regeneration combined with the hosting of internationally significant events has helped to re-purpose Liverpool as one of the most visited, tourist orientated, cities in the United Kingdom. City leaders are focussing on long-term strategies to grow the city's population and economy, while national government explores the continuous potential for devolution in the city.

In 2002, Queen Elizabeth II and Prince Philip, Duke of Edinburgh visited Liverpool to mark the Golden Jubilee. On speaking to an audience at Liverpool Town Hall, the Queen recognised Liverpool as "one of the most distinctive and energetic parts of the United Kingdom", and paid tribute to the city's "major orchestras, world-class museums and galleries". She also acknowledged Liverpool's bid to become the European Capital of Culture. To celebrate the Golden Jubilee of Elizabeth II in 2002, the conservation charity Plantlife organised a competition to choose county flowers; the sea-holly was Liverpool's final choice. The initiative was designed to highlight growing threats to the UK's flower species and also ask the public about which flowers best represented their county.

Capitalising on the popularity of 1960s rock groups, such as the Beatles, as well as the city's world-class art galleries, museums and landmarks, tourism and culture have become a significant factor in Liverpool's economy.

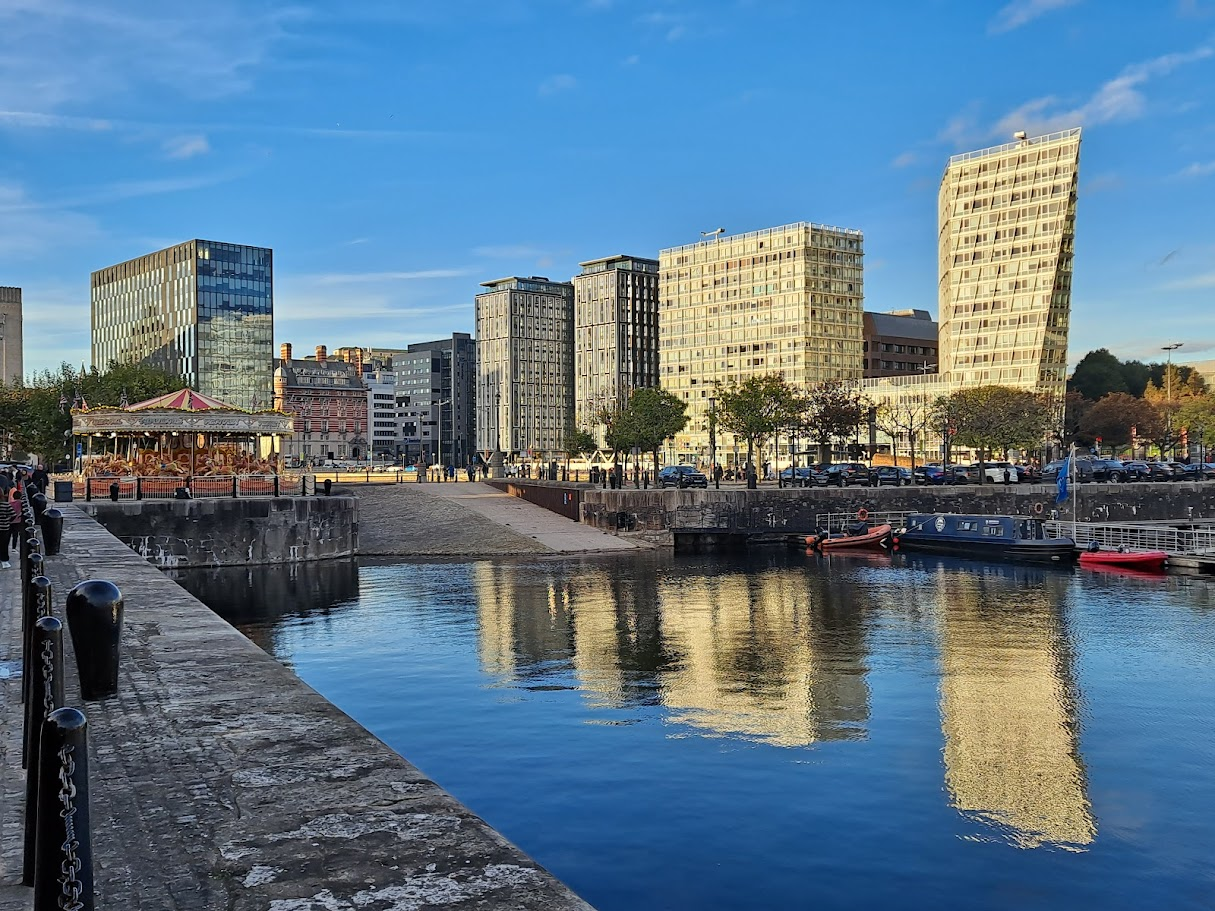
Modern developments on the Liverpool Waterfront

In 2004, property developer Grosvenor started the Paradise Project, a £920 million development based on Paradise Street. This produced one of the most significant changes to Liverpool's city centre since the post-war reconstruction. Renamed as 'Liverpool One,' the centre opened in May 2008.

In 2007, events and celebrations took place in honour of the 800th anniversary of the founding of the borough of Liverpool. Liverpool was designated as a joint European Capital of Culture for 2008. The celebrations included the erection of La Princesse, a large mechanical spider 20 metres high and weighing 37 tonnes, which represented the "eight legs" of Liverpool: honour, history, music, the Mersey, the ports, governance, sunshine and culture. La Princesse roamed the streets of the city during the festivities, and concluded by entering the Queensway Tunnel.

Spearheaded by the multi-billion-pound Liverpool ONE development, regeneration continued throughout the 2010s. Some of the most significant redevelopment projects included new buildings in the Commercial District, King's Dock, Mann Island, around Lime Street, the Baltic Triangle, RopeWalks, and Edge Lane.

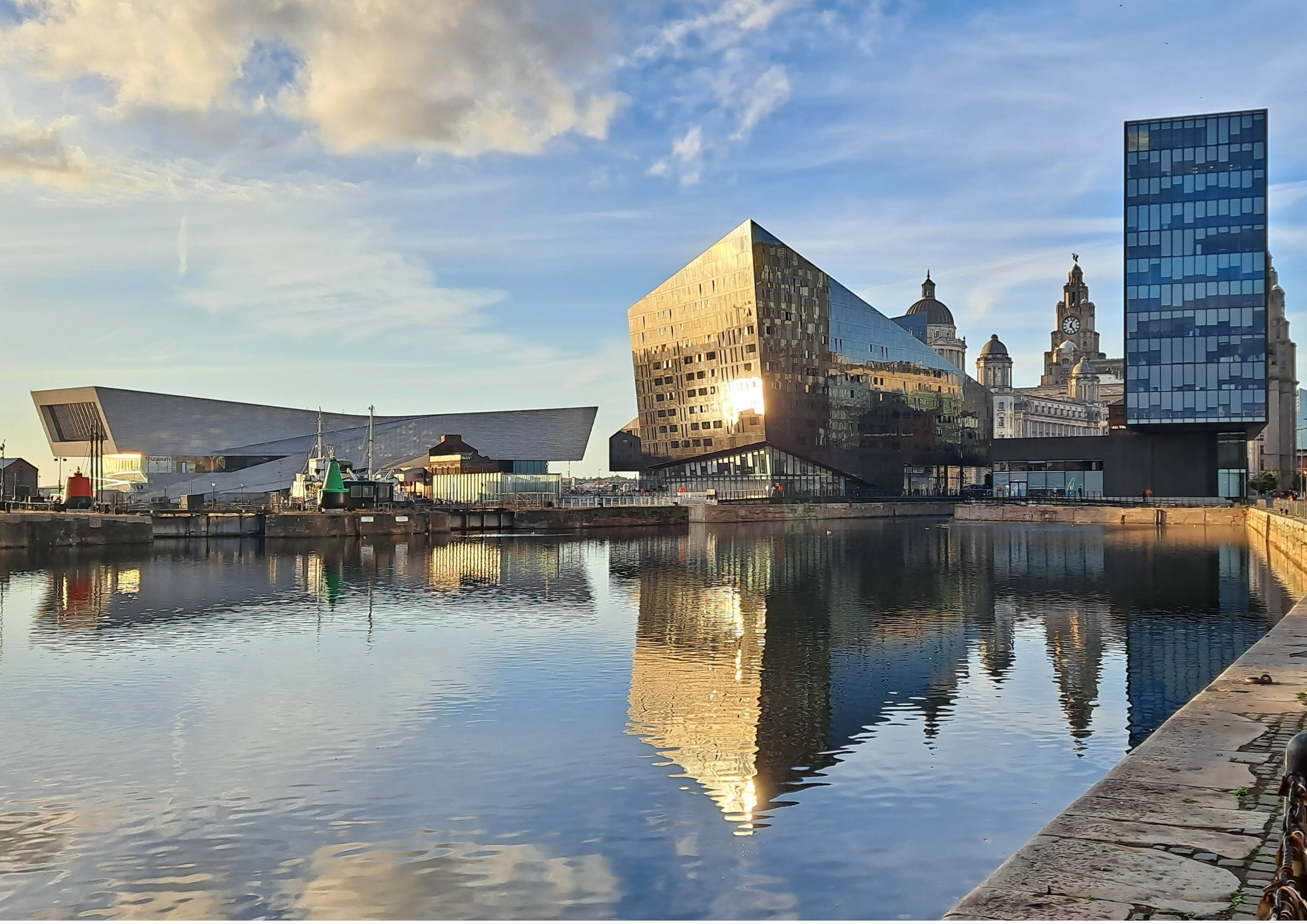
Headquarters of Liverpool City Region Combined Authority, which invests in Liverpool's major infrastructure and regeneration projects

Changes to Liverpool's governance took place in 2014. The local authority of Liverpool City Council decided to pool its power and resources with surrounding boroughs through the formation of the Liverpool City Region Combined Authority in a form of devolution. With a devolved budget granted by central government, the authority now oversees and invests in foremost strategic affairs throughout the Liverpool City Region, including major regeneration projects. The authority, along with Liverpool City Council itself, has embarked on long-term plans to grow the population and economy of the city.

By the 2020s, urban regeneration throughout the city continues. Liverpool Waters, a mixed-use development in the city's disused northern docklands, has been identified as one of the largest megaprojects in the UK's history. Everton's new stadium at Bramley-Moore Dock was regarded as the largest single-site private sector development in the United Kingdom at the time of construction.

Major events, business and political conferences regularly take place in the city and form an important part of the economy. In June 2014, Prime Minister David Cameron launched the International Festival for Business in Liverpool, the world's largest business event in 2014, and the largest in the UK since the Festival of Britain in 1951. The Labour Party has chosen Liverpool numerous times since the mid-2010s for their annual Labour Party Conference. Liverpool hosted the Eurovision Song Contest 2023.

In the early to mid-2020s, Liverpool saw several notable demonstrations on social and political issues. Between September and November 2022, about 600 workers at the Port of Liverpool held a series of strikes over pay. In October 2023, following the 7 October attacks, protests linked to the Israel–Gaza conflict took place in Liverpool, including a city-centre march, a student occupation and encampment by Palestine protesters at the University of Liverpool, and further protests and marches that continued into 2024. In August 2024, anti-immigration and anti-racism demonstrations were accompanied by violent disorder. In 2025 and 2026, protests by Palestine supporters over the UK's ban on Palestine Action, a group proscribed under the Terrorism Act 2000, led to 66 arrests and more than 50 arrests respectively in Liverpool.

=== Inventions and innovations ===
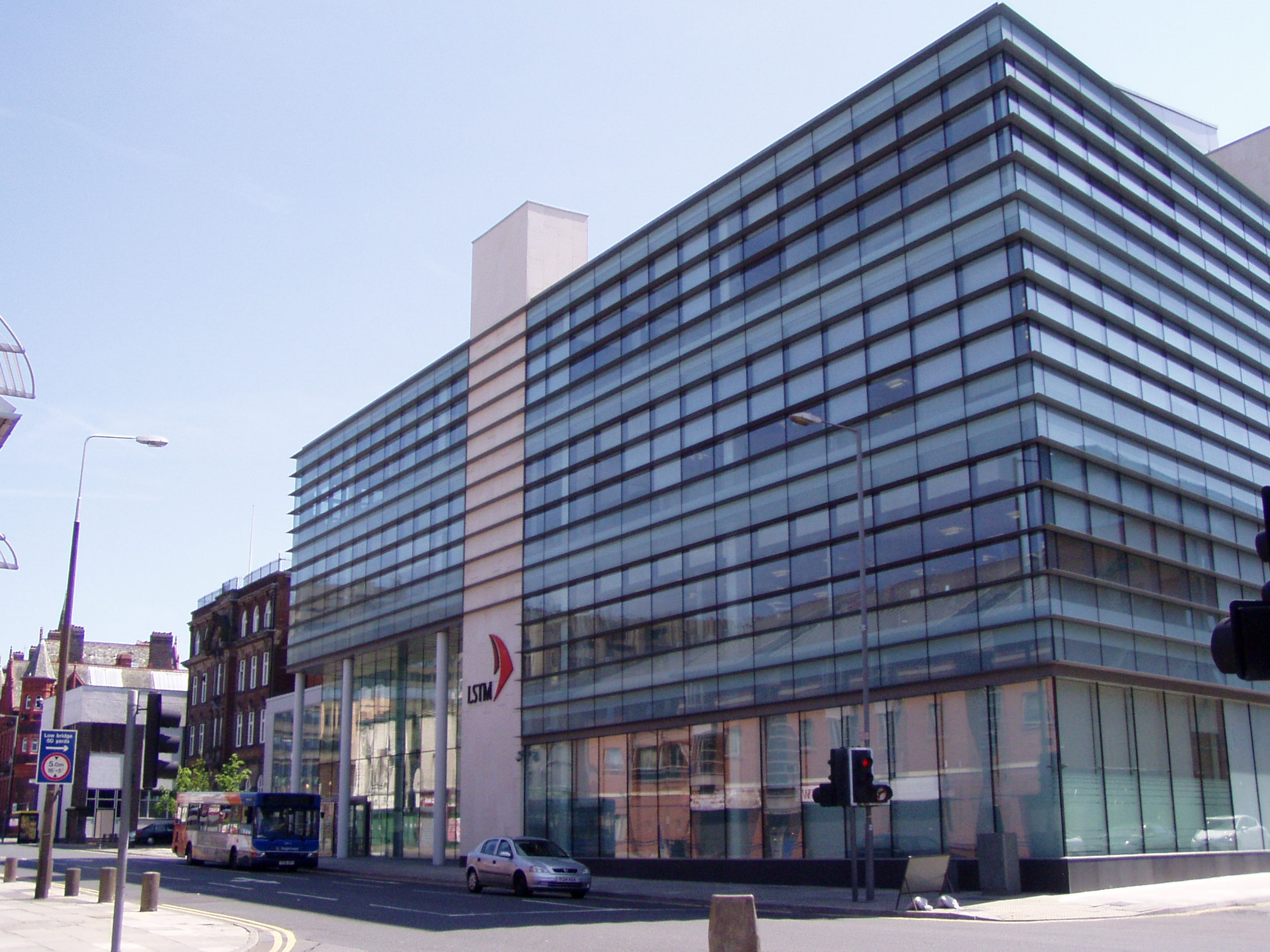
The Liverpool School of Tropical Medicine, the first such school in the world

Liverpool has been a centre of invention and innovation. Railways, transatlantic steamships, municipal trams, and electric trains were all pioneered in Liverpool as modes of mass transit. In 1829 and 1836, the first railway tunnels in the world were constructed under Liverpool (Wapping Tunnel). From 1950 to 1951, the world's first scheduled passenger helicopter service ran between Liverpool and Cardiff.

The first School for the Blind, Mechanics' Institute, High School for Girls, council house, and Juvenile Court were all founded in Liverpool. Charities such as the RSPCA, NSPCC, Age Concern, Relate, and Citizen's Advice Bureau all evolved from work in the city.

The first lifeboat station, public bath and wash-house, sanitary act, medical officer for health (William Henry Duncan), district nurse, slum clearance, purpose-built ambulance, X-ray medical diagnosis, school of tropical medicine (Liverpool School of Tropical Medicine), motorised municipal fire-engine, free school meal, cancer research centre, and zoonosis research centre all originated in Liverpool. The first British Nobel Prize was awarded in 1902 to Ronald Ross, professor at the School of Tropical Medicine, the first school of its kind in the world. Orthopaedic surgery was pioneered in Liverpool by Hugh Owen Thomas, and modern medical anaesthetics by Thomas Cecil Gray.

The world's first integrated sewer system was constructed in Liverpool by James Newlands, appointed in 1847 as the UK's first borough engineer. Liverpool also founded the UK's first Underwriters' Association and the first Institute of Accountants. The Western world's first financial derivatives (cotton futures) were traded on the Liverpool Cotton Exchange in the late 1700s.

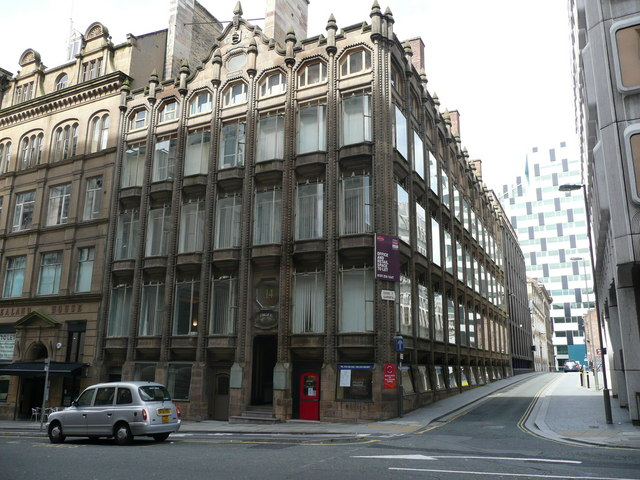
Oriel Chambers, the first "modern" building in the world with its iron-framed curtain-wall

In the arts, Liverpool was home to the first lending library (The Lyceum), athenaeum society (Liverpool Athenaeum), arts centre (Bluecoat Chambers), and public art conservation centre (National Conservation Centre). It is also home to the UK's oldest surviving classical orchestra (Royal Liverpool Philharmonic Orchestra) and repertory theatre (Liverpool Playhouse).

In 1864, Peter Ellis built the world's first iron-framed, curtain-walled office building, Oriel Chambers, which has become a defining feature of skyscrapers around the world. The UK's first purpose-built department store was Compton House, completed in 1867 for the retailer J.R. Jeffrey. It was the largest store in the world at the time.

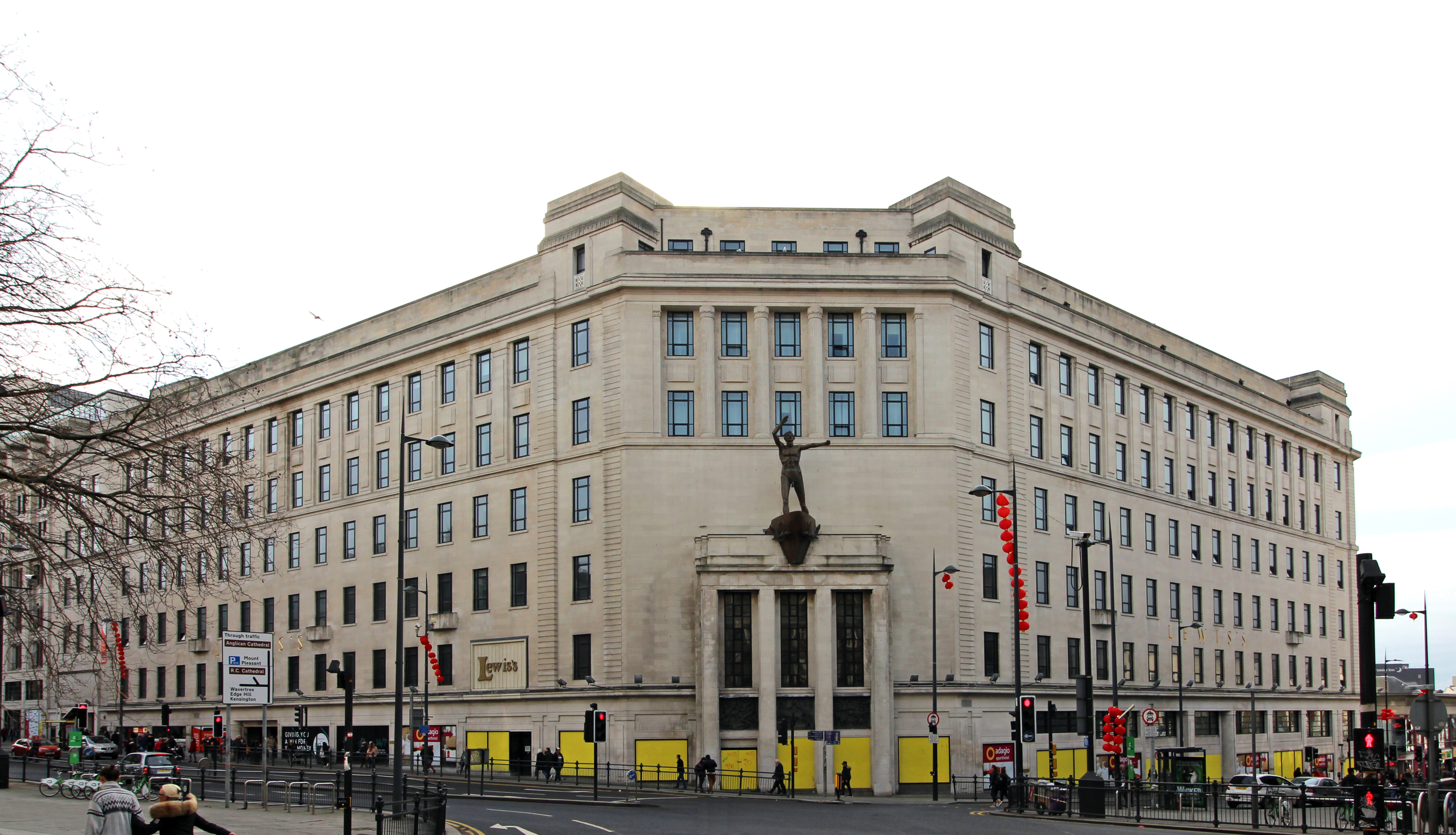
Lewis's department store on Ranelagh Street. In 1879, the Christmas grotto was conceived in the store.

Between 1862 and 1867, Liverpool held an annual Grand Olympic Festival. Devised by John Hulley and Charles Pierre Melly, these games were the first to be wholly amateur in nature and international in outlook. The programme of the first modern Olympiad in Athens in 1896 was almost identical to that of the Liverpool Olympics. In 1865, Hulley co-founded the National Olympian Association in Liverpool, a forerunner of the British Olympic Association. Its articles of foundation provided the framework for the Olympic Charter.

A concept devised by retail entrepreneur David Lewis, the first Christmas grotto opened in Lewis's department store in Liverpool in 1879. Sir Alfred Lewis Jones, a shipowner, introduced bananas to the UK via Liverpool's docks in 1884. The Mersey Railway, opened in 1886, incorporated the world's first tunnel under a tidal estuary and the world's first deep-level underground stations (Liverpool James Street railway station).

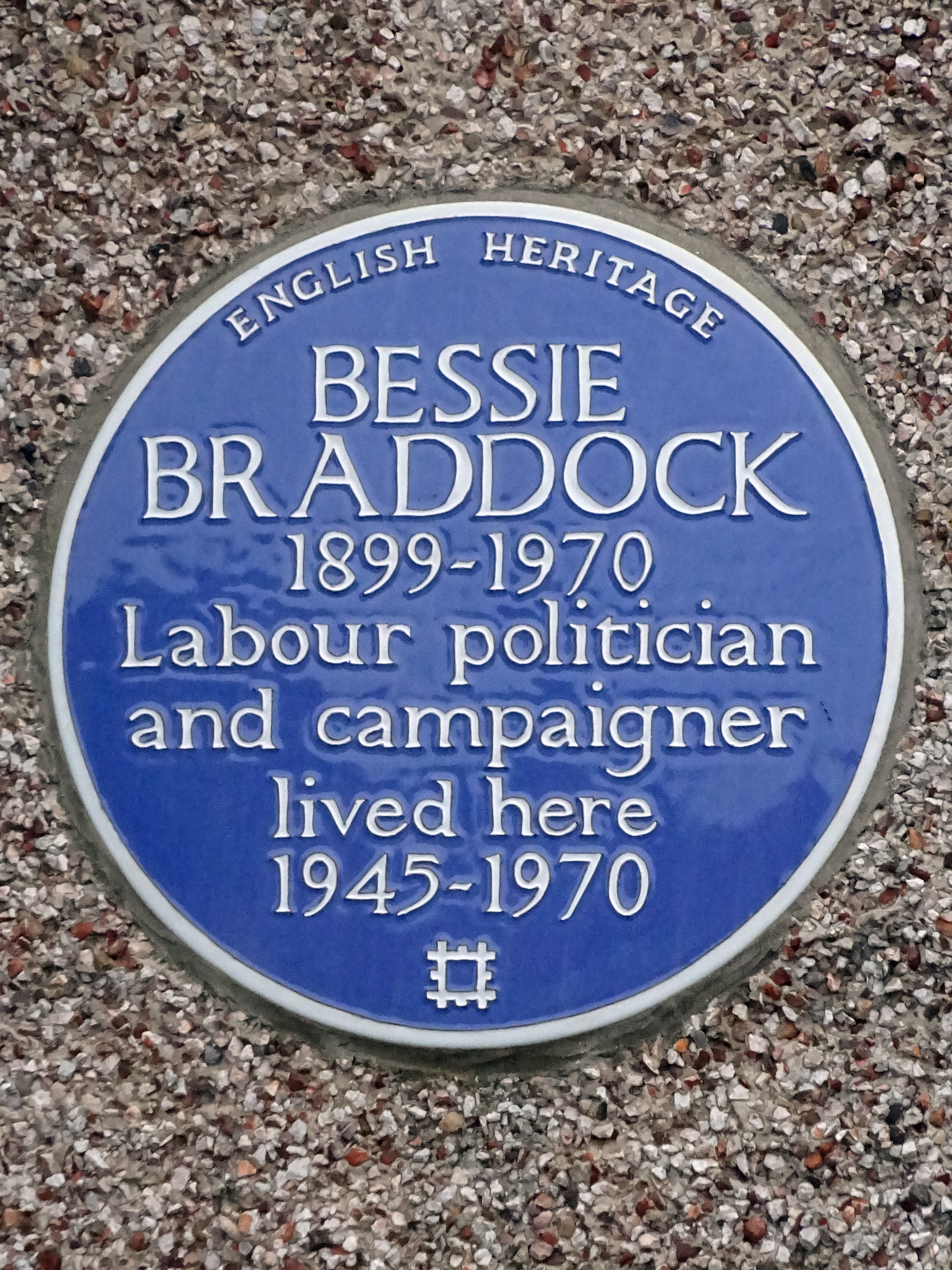
Liverpool was the first city outside London to be chosen to have an official Blue plaque and now has the largest number outside London.

In 1889, borough engineer John Alexander Brodie invented the football goal net. He was also a pioneer in the use of pre-fabricated housing and oversaw the construction of the UK's first ring road (A5058) and intercity highway (East Lancashire Road), as well as the Queensway Tunnel linking Liverpool and Birkenhead. Described as "the eighth wonder of the world" at the time of its construction, it was the longest underwater tunnel in the world for 24 years.

In 1897, the Lumière brothers filmed Liverpool, including what is believed to be the world's first tracking shot, taken from the Liverpool Overhead Railway, the world's first elevated electrified railway. The Overhead Railway was the first railway in the world to use electric multiple units, employ automatic signalling, and install an escalator.

Liverpool inventor Frank Hornby was a visionary in toy development and manufacture, producing three of the most popular lines of toys in the 20th century: Meccano, Hornby Model Railways (both in 1901), and Dinky Toys in 1934. The British Interplanetary Society, founded in Liverpool in 1933 by Phillip Ellaby Cleator, is the world's oldest existing organisation devoted to the promotion of spaceflight. Its journal, the Journal of the British Interplanetary Society, is the longest-running astronautical publication in the world.

In 1999, Liverpool was the first city outside London to be awarded blue plaques by English Heritage in recognition of the "significant contribution made by its sons and daughters in all walks of life".

== Government ==
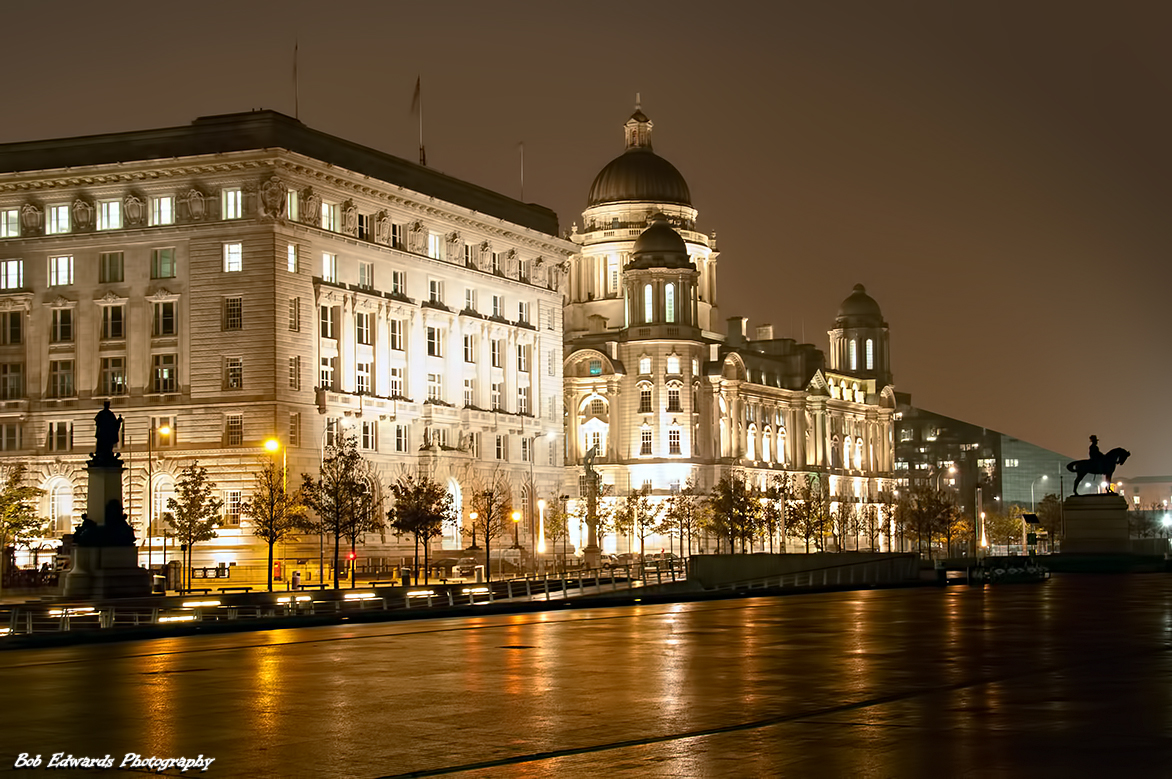
The Cunard Building (left), housing the main offices of Liverpool City Council

For the purposes of local government, Liverpool is classified as a metropolitan borough with city status. The metropolitan borough is located within both the county of Merseyside and the Liverpool City Region. Each of these geographical areas is treated as an administrative area with different levels of local governance applying to each.

Liverpool City Council is the governing body solely for the Metropolitan Borough of Liverpool and performs functions that are standard of an English Unitary Authority. The Liverpool City Region Combined Authority and the Mayor of the Liverpool City Region reserve major strategic powers over such things as transport, economic development and regeneration for the city along with the 5 surrounding boroughs of the Liverpool City Region. The Combined Authority has competency over areas which have been devolved by national government and are specific to the city region.

Nevertheless, there are a few exceptions to local governance apart from these two structures. Liverpool was administered by Merseyside County Council between 1974 and 1986 and some residual aspects of organisation which date back to this time have survived. When the County Council was disbanded in 1986, most civic functions were transferred to Liverpool City Council. However, several authorities such as the police and fire and rescue service, continue to be run at a county-wide level. The county of Merseyside, therefore, continues to exist as an administrative area for a few limited services only, while the capability and capacity of the Liverpool City Region Combined Authority is evolving over time.

The city also elects five members of Parliament (MPs) to the Westminster Parliament, all Labour as of the 2024 general election.

=== Liverpool City Council ===
==== City Council Leader and Cabinet ====
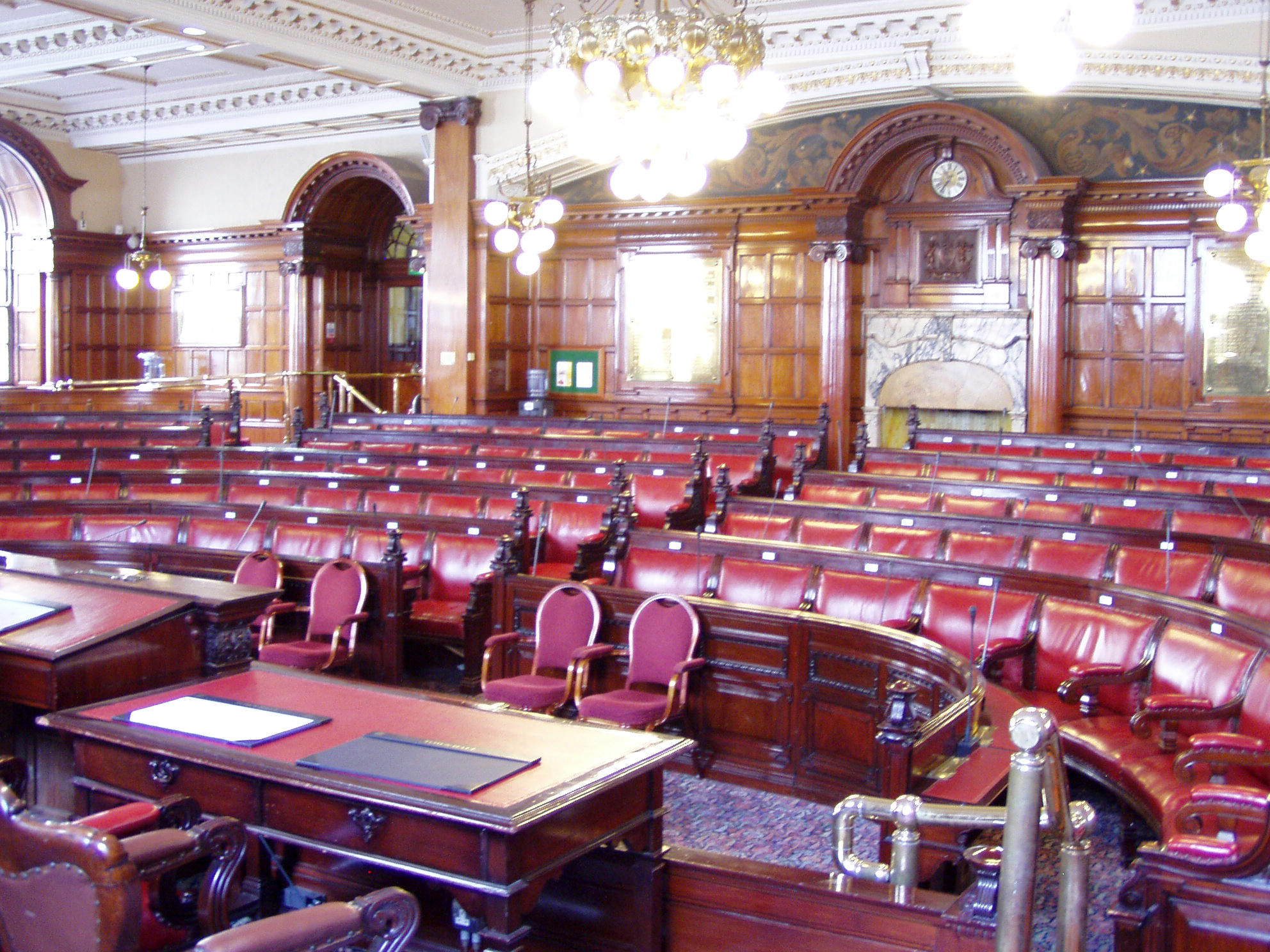
City Councillors meet regularly at the Council Chamber in Liverpool Town Hall to conduct civic business.

Liverpool City Council operates under a constitution comprising 85 city councillors who are directly elected by the Liverpool electorate every four years and represent a variety of different political parties. The city councillors make decisions about local services for the city's people.

At each election, the political party that wins the majority of the 85 council seats leads the council for the following four years. The local leader of this party assumes the role of Leader of the City Council who then chairs a Cabinet of 9 councillors who are assigned specific responsibilities known as 'portfolios'.

The incumbent Leader of Liverpool City Council is Councillor Liam Robinson, who represents the Labour Party, which secured a large majority at the 2023 local election, the Leader is also a member of the Mayor of the Liverpool City Regions cabinet (Separate from the City Council Cabinet), at present Robinson holds the portfolio of Cabinet Member for Innovation.

The City Council's decisions and scrutiny of activities are undertaken by a number of different committees and panels which include the Overview and Scrutiny Committees, Scrutiny Panels, Regulatory Committees and other committees. The day-to-day management of the council is carried out by the management team which includes the Chief Executive and several directors and senior officers. The management team works with the Cabinet and councillors to deliver strategic direction and priorities such as the budget and the City Plan.

==== Liverpool City Council elections ====
Every four years, the city elects 85 councillors from 64 local council wards.

During the 2023 Liverpool City Council election, the Labour Party consolidated its control of Liverpool City Council, following on from the previous elections. Out of the total 85 City Council seats up for election, The Labour Party won 61 seats (53.13% of the electorate's total votes), the Liberal Democrats won 15 seats (21.61% of the votes), the Green Party won three seats (9.76% of the votes), the Liverpool Community Independents won three seats (4.64% of the votes) and the Liberal Party won the remaining three seats (3.21% of the votes). The Conservative Party, the political party in power at national government, had no representation on Liverpool City Council. Only 27.27% of the eligible Liverpool electorate turned out to vote.

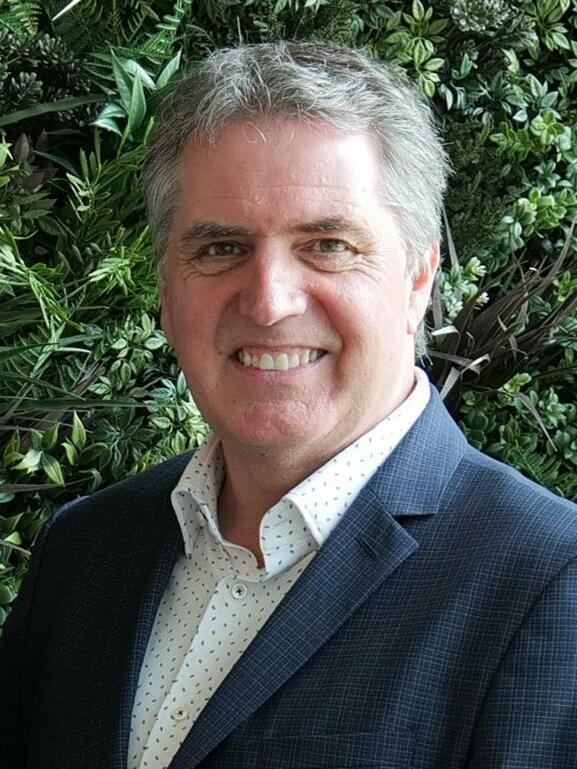
Steve Rotheram, Mayor of the Liverpool City Region

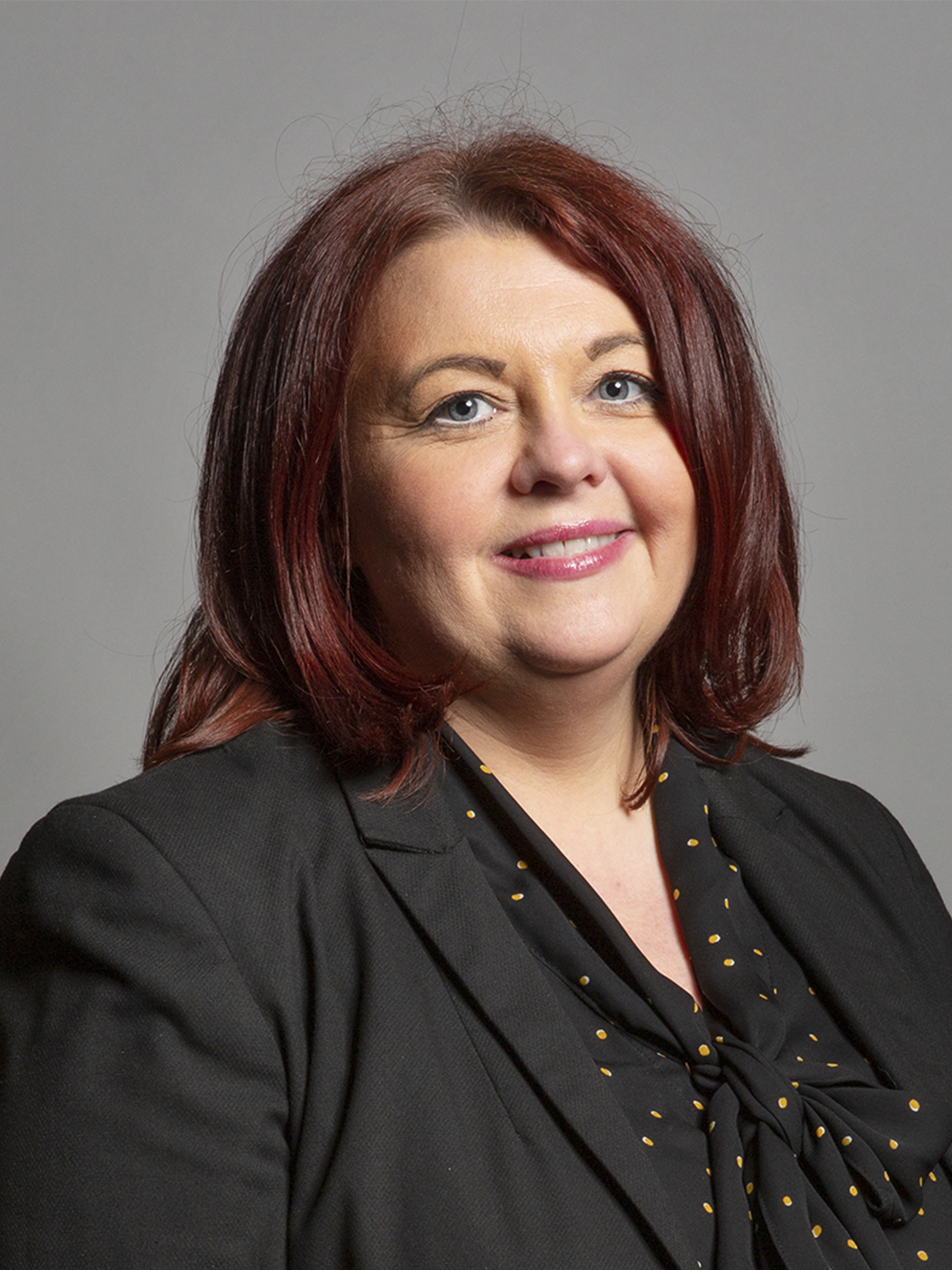
Paula Barker, MP for Liverpool Wavertree

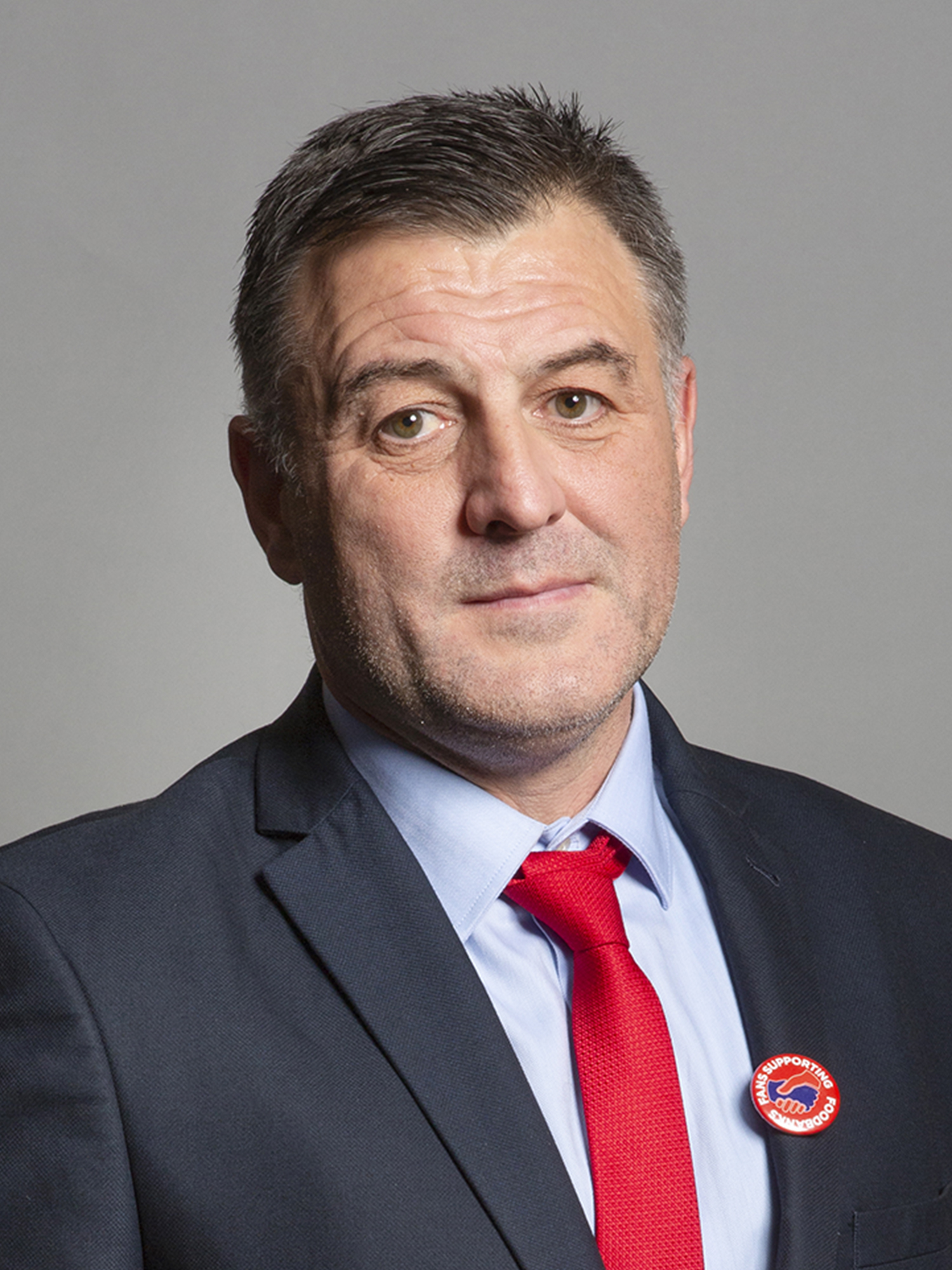
Ian Byrne, MP for Liverpool West Derby

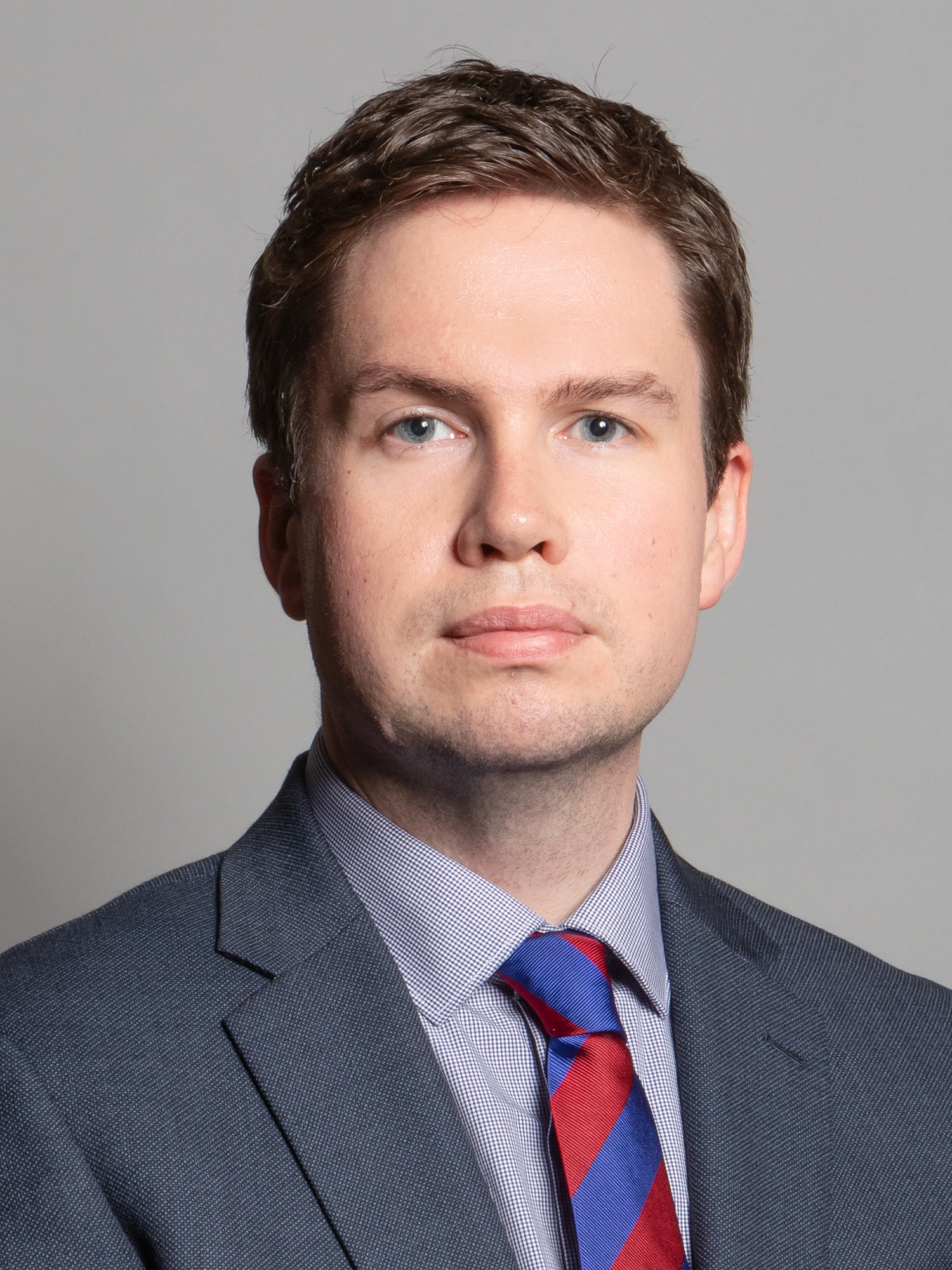
Dan Carden, MP for Liverpool Walton

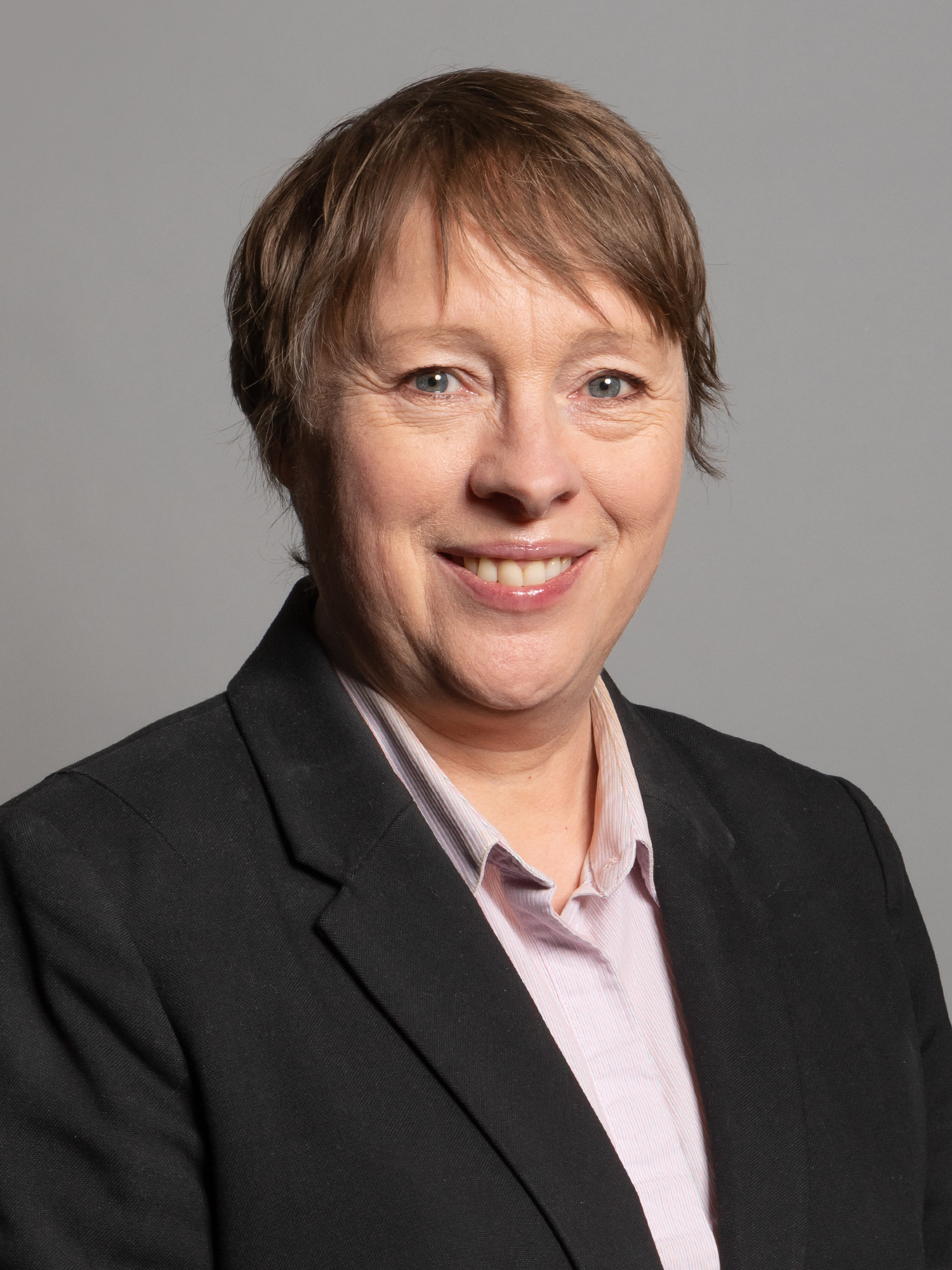
Maria Eagle, MP for Liverpool Garston

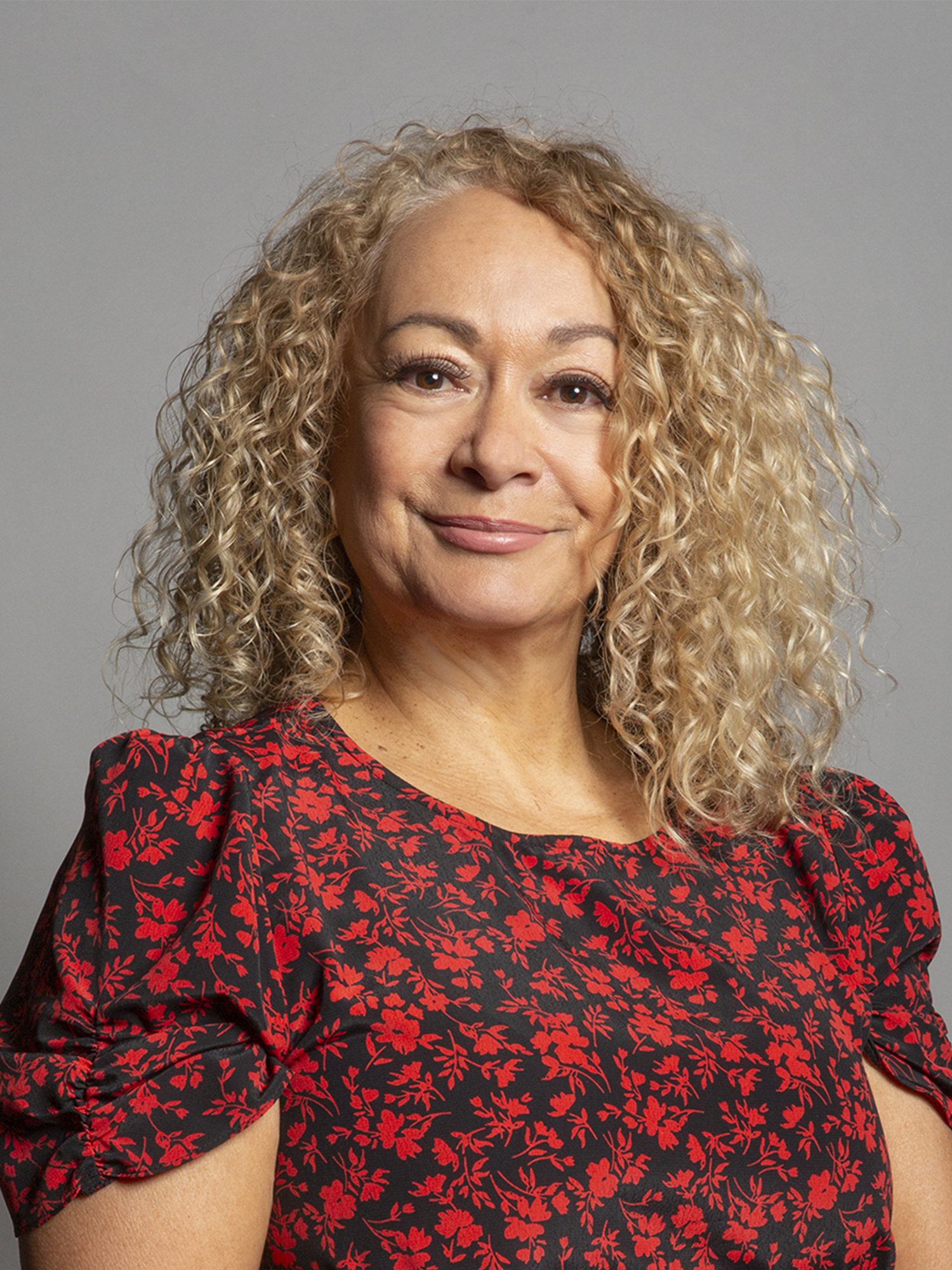
Kim Johnson, MP for Liverpool Riverside

Throughout most of the 19th and early 20th centuries, Liverpool was a municipal stronghold of Toryism. However, support for the Conservative Party in recent times has been among the lowest in any part of Britain, particularly since the monetarist economic policies of former prime minister Margaret Thatcher. After the 1979 general election, many have claimed that her victory contributed to longstanding high unemployment and decline in the city. Liverpool is one of the Labour Party's key strongholds; however, the city has also seen hard times under Labour governments. Particularly in the Winter of Discontent (late 1978 and early 1979) when Liverpool suffered public sector strikes along with the rest of the United Kingdom, but also when it suffered the particularly humiliating misfortune of having grave-diggers going on strike, leaving the dead unburied for long periods.

==== City Council criticism and improvement ====
In recent years, Liverpool City Council began an extensive improvement program designed to ensure that the authority makes efficient use of taxpayers' money and to encourage more business and investment in the city. Grosvenor Group, the property company responsible for Liverpool One, commended the changes as an "opportunity for bold thinking in liverpool".

In 2021, a highly critical government inspection and subsequent report of Liverpool City Council (referred to as the Caller report) identified multiple shortcomings at Liverpool City Council. The Secretary of State for Housing, Communities and Local Government, Robert Jenrick sent government commissioners to oversee the City Council's highways, regeneration, property management, governance and financial decision-making. The authority was compelled to commit to a three-year improvement plan in which the entire structure of the council would be overhauled. As a result of the intervention, major structural changes at the City Council took place by the 2023 United Kingdom local elections, which were labelled "the most unpredictable [elections] in the city's history". The number of electoral wards in the city was doubled from 30 to 64, while the overall number of city councillors up for election was reduced from 90 to 85. In future, the council would also change to 'all out' elections every four years whereby every single city councillor would be eligible for re-election at the same time. The role of elected city mayor was also abolished and the Council reverted to the previous Leader and Cabinet style of leadership. The outcome of the elections were seen not only as a test of how the general public would respond to the government intervention in the city, but also to Prime Minister Rishi Sunak's government as a whole.

Liam Robinson became the new Leader of Liverpool City Council at the 2023 City Council election. The Liverpool Strategic Futures Advisory Panel, chaired by the Mayor of Liverpool City Region Steve Rotheram, and including several high-profile figures with experience in local government, was established. The panel was tasked with directing the council's long-term future outside of government intervention measures and to advise on plans and priorities that the city should pursue.

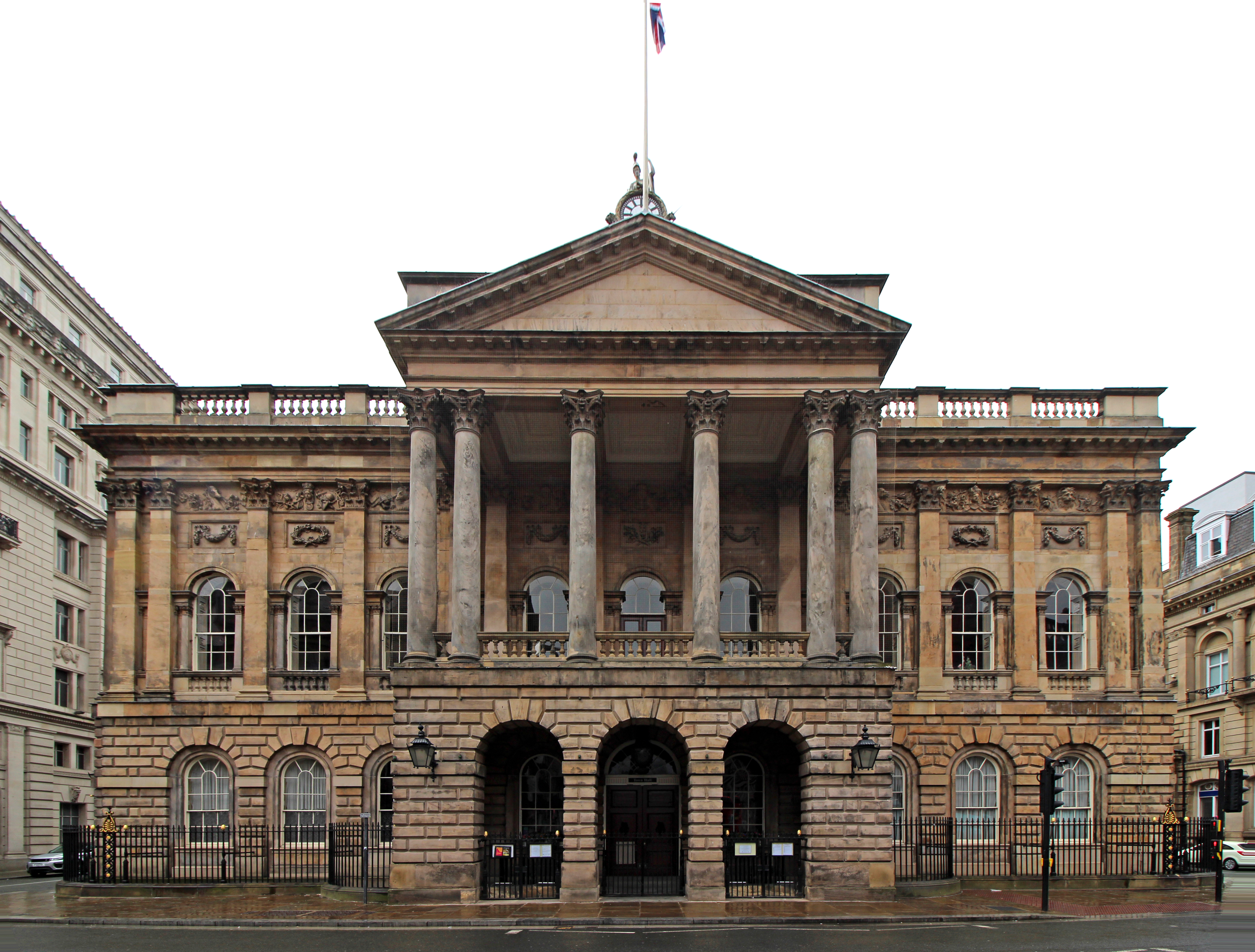
Liverpool Town Hall houses the official office for the Lord Mayor of Liverpool

In February 2008, Liverpool City Council was reported to be the worst-performing council in the country, receiving just a one-star rating (classified as inadequate). The main cause of the poor rating was attributed to the council's poor handling of tax-payer money, including the accumulation of a £20 million shortfall while the city held the title of European Capital of Culture. In April 2024, the Office for Local Government released a ranking of local authorities, placing Liverpool City Council 317th out of a possible 318.

==== Lord Mayor of Liverpool ====
The Lord Mayor of Liverpool is an ancient ceremonial role. Councillors within Liverpool City Council (not the general public) elect the Lord Mayor annually, who then serves a one-year term. The Lord Mayor is styled as the "first citizen" and is chosen to represent the city at civic functions and engagements, promote it to the wider world, support local charities and community groups, attend religious events, meet delegates from Liverpool's twin cities, chair council meetings and confer Honorary Freemen and associations. The Lord Mayor is also the presiding officer for Liverpool City Council full meetings.

=== Mayor of the Liverpool City Region ===
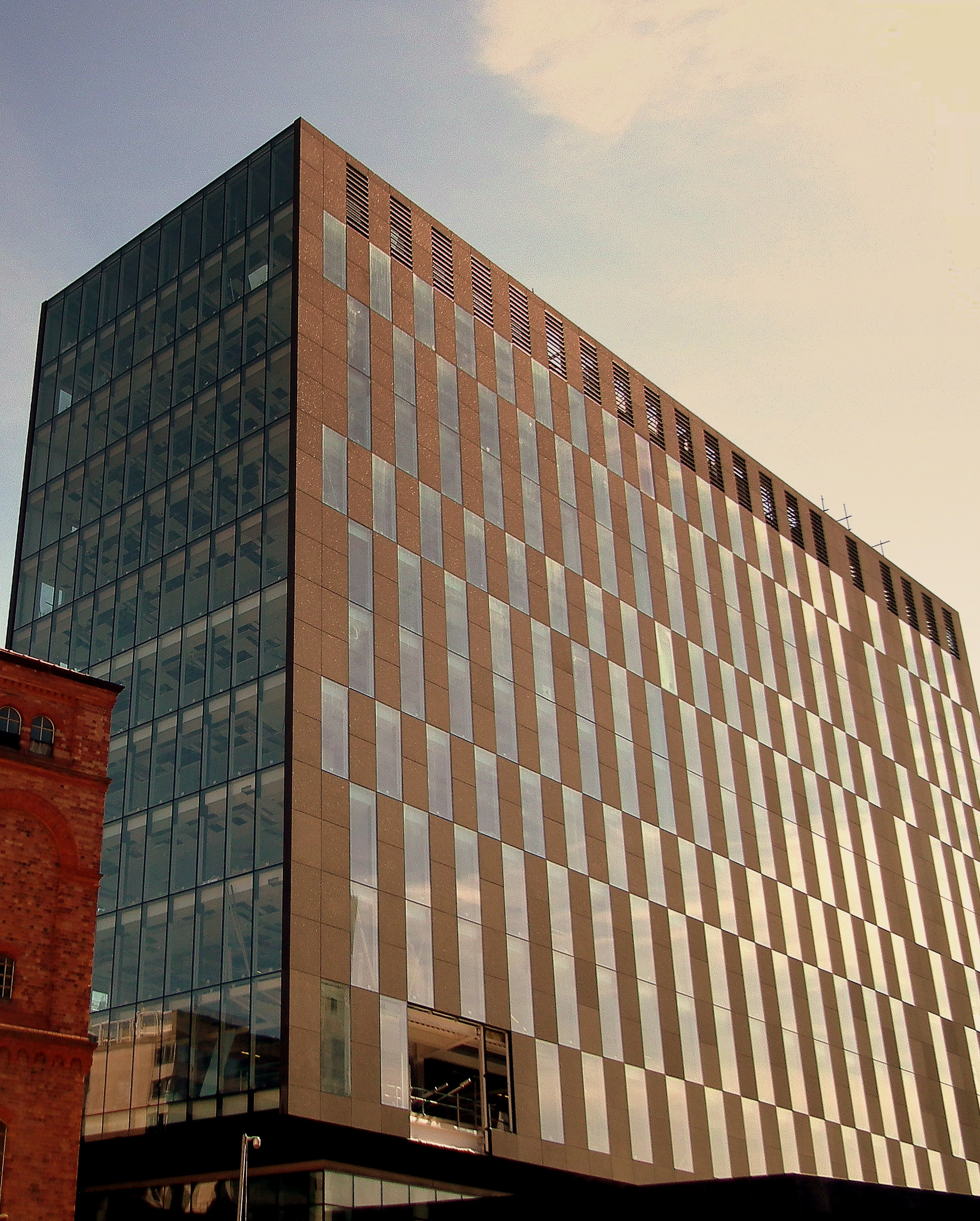
1 Mann Island contains the offices of the Mayor of the Liverpool City Region and combined authority.

Liverpool is one of the six constituent boroughs of the Liverpool City Region. The Mayor of the Liverpool City Region is directly every four years by residents of those six boroughs and oversees the Liverpool City Region Combined Authority. The Combined Authority is the top-tier administrative body for the local governance of the city region and is tasked with taking major strategic decisions on issues such as transport and investment, economic development, employment and skills, tourism, culture, housing and physical infrastructure. The current Mayor is Steve Rotheram.

=== Parliamentary constituencies and MPs ===
Liverpool is included within five parliamentary constituencies, through which MPs are elected to represent the city in Westminster: Liverpool Garston, Liverpool Riverside, Liverpool Walton, Liverpool Wavertree and Liverpool West Derby. At the last general election, all were won by Labour with representation being from Maria Eagle, Kim Johnson, Dan Carden, Paula Barker and Ian Byrne respectively.

== Geography ==
=== Environment ===
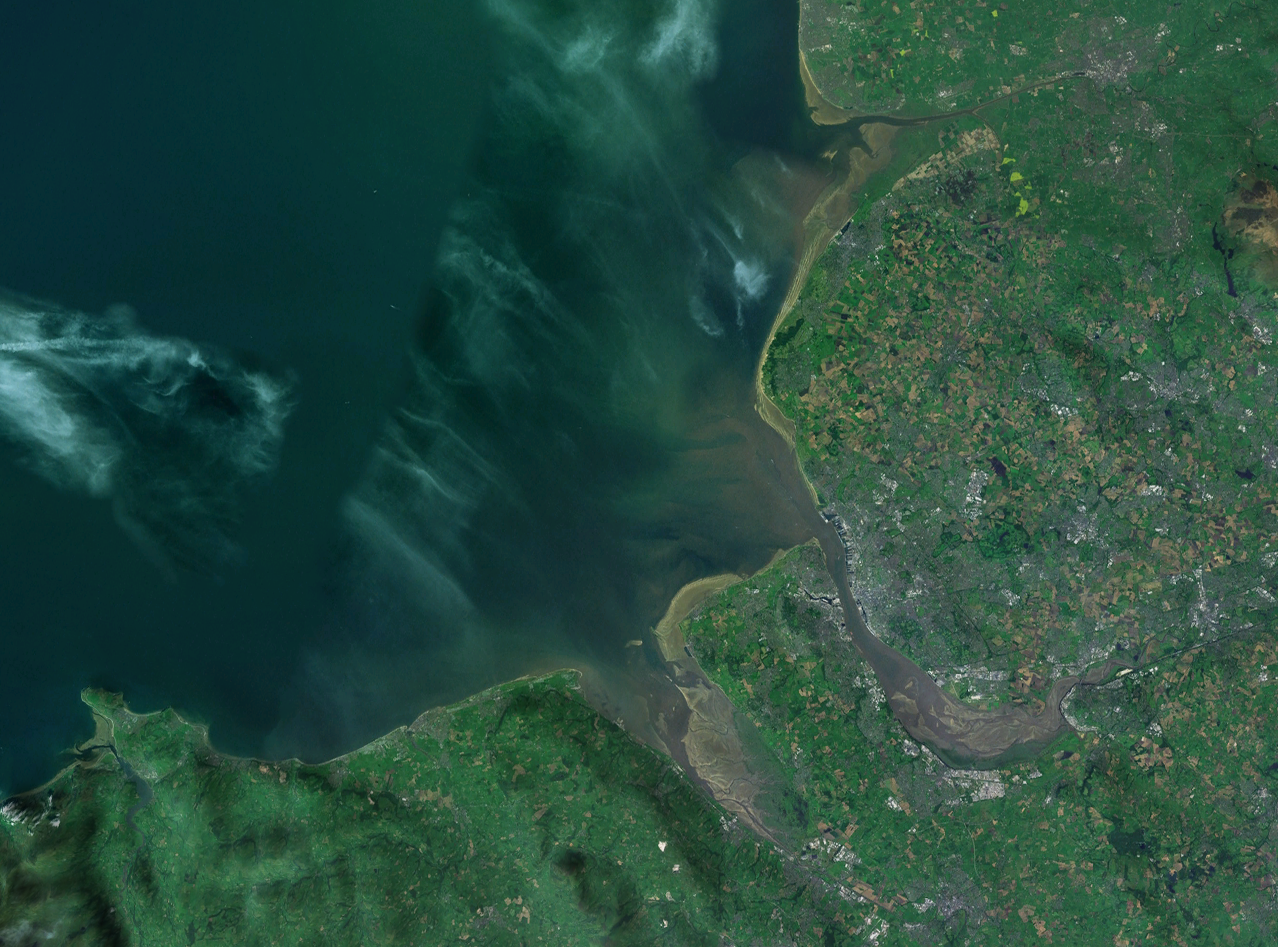
Satellite imagery showing Liverpool Bay, Liverpool and the wider Merseyside area

Liverpool has been described as having "the most splendid setting of any English city". At 53°24′0″N 2°59′0″W (53.4, −2.98), 176 miles (283 kilometres) north-west of London, located on the Liverpool Bay of the Irish Sea, Liverpool is built across a ridge of sandstone hills rising up to a height of around 230 feet (70 m) above sea-level at Everton Hill, which represents the southern boundary of the West Lancashire Coastal Plain.

The Mersey Estuary separates Liverpool from the Wirral Peninsula. The boundaries of Liverpool are adjacent to Bootle, Crosby and Maghull in south Sefton to the north, and Kirkby, Huyton, Prescot and Halewood in Knowsley to the east.

=== Climate ===
Liverpool

Climate chart (precipitation, max. and min. temperature)
J	F	M	A	M	J	J	A	S	O	N	D
69 8 3	57 8 3	53 10 4	50 13 6	53 16 8	64 18 11	66 20 14	72 20 14	77 18 11	90 14 9	82 11 6	92 8 3
- █ Average max. and min. temperatures in °C
- █ Precipitation totals in mm
- Source: Met Office
Imperial conversion
J	F	M	A	M	J	J	A	S	O	N	D
2.7 46 37	2.2 46 37	2.1 50 39	2 55 43	2.1 61 46	2.5 64 52	2.6 68 57	2.8 68 57	3 64 52	3.5 57 48	3.2 52 43	3.6 46 37
- █ Average max. and min. temperatures in °F
- █ Precipitation totals in inches

Liverpool experiences a temperate maritime climate (Köppen: Cfb), like much of the British Isles, with relatively mild summers, cool winters and rainfall spread fairly evenly throughout the year. Rainfall and temperature records had been kept at Bidston Hill since 1867, but records for atmospheric pressure go back as far as at least 1846. Bidston closed down in 2002 but the Met Office also has a weather station at Crosby. Since records began in 1867, temperatures have ranged from −17.6 °C (0.3 °F) on 21 December 2010 to 34.5 °C (94.1 °F) on 2 August 1990, although Liverpool Airport recorded a temperature of 35.0 °C (95.0 °F) on 19 July 2006.

The lowest amount of sunshine on record was 16.5 hours in December 1927 whereas the most was 314.5 hours in July 2013.

Tornado activity or funnel cloud formation is very rare in and around the Liverpool area and tornadoes that do form are usually weak. Recent tornadoes or funnel clouds in Merseyside have been seen in 1998 and 2014.

During the period 1981–2010, Crosby recorded an average of 32.8 days of air frost per year, which is low for the United Kingdom. Snow is fairly common during the winter although heavy snow is rare. Snow generally falls between November and March but can occasionally fall earlier and later. In recent times, the earliest snowfall was on 1 October 2008 while the latest occurred on 15 May 2012. Although historically, the earliest snowfall occurred on 10 September 1908 and the latest on 2 June 1975.

Rainfall, although light, is quite a common occurrence in Liverpool, with the wettest month on record being August 1956, which recorded 221.2 mm (8.71 in) of rain and the driest being February 1932, with 0.9 mm (0.035 in). The driest year on record was 1991, with 480.5 mm (18.92 in) of rainfall and the wettest was 1872, with 1,159.9 mm (45.67 in).

Climate data for Crosby (Note: Weather station is located 7 miles (11 km) from the Liverpool city centre.) WMO ID: 03316; coordinates 53°29′50″N 3°03′28″W; elevation: 30 m (98 ft); 1991–2020 normals, (Note: Sunshine hours were recorded at the Bidston Observatory from the period of 1971–2000.) (Note: Humidity was recorded at the Bidston Observatory for the period of 1975–June 2002. The period Jul–Sep 1992 has no record, with Jan–May 2001 reporting unreliabe data.) extremes 1867–present (Note: From 1867–2002, extremes were recorded at the Bidston Observatory in Wirral. Since 1983, extremes were recorded at Crosby, Sefton.)
Month	Jan	Feb	Mar	Apr	May	Jun	Jul	Aug	Sep	Oct	Nov	Dec	Year
Record high °C (°F)	15.1 (59.2)	18.9 (66.0)	21.2 (70.2)	24.6 (76.3)	32.5 (90.5)	34.0 (93.2)	35.5 (95.9)	34.5 (94.1)	30.4 (86.7)	25.9 (78.6)	18.7 (65.7)	15.8 (60.4)	35.5 (95.9)
Mean daily maximum °C (°F)	7.5 (45.5)	7.9 (46.2)	9.9 (49.8)	12.8 (55.0)	15.9 (60.6)	18.4 (65.1)	20.0 (68.0)	19.7 (67.5)	17.7 (63.9)	14.2 (57.6)	10.5 (50.9)	8.0 (46.4)	13.6 (56.5)
Daily mean °C (°F)	5.2 (41.4)	5.3 (41.5)	6.9 (44.4)	9.2 (48.6)	12.1 (53.8)	14.9 (58.8)	16.7 (62.1)	16.6 (61.9)	14.5 (58.1)	11.4 (52.5)	8.1 (46.6)	5.6 (42.1)	10.5 (50.9)
Mean daily minimum °C (°F)	2.8 (37.0)	2.7 (36.9)	3.9 (39.0)	5.6 (42.1)	8.3 (46.9)	11.3 (52.3)	13.5 (56.3)	13.5 (56.3)	11.2 (52.2)	8.5 (47.3)	5.7 (42.3)	3.1 (37.6)	7.5 (45.5)
Record low °C (°F)	−13.1 (8.4)	−11.3 (11.7)	−8.6 (16.5)	−5.6 (21.9)	−1.7 (28.9)	1.0 (33.8)	5.0 (41.0)	3.1 (37.6)	1.7 (35.1)	−2.9 (26.8)	−7.5 (18.5)	−17.6 (0.3)	−17.6 (0.3)
Average precipitation mm (inches)	69.4 (2.73)	57.1 (2.25)	53.3 (2.10)	49.8 (1.96)	52.5 (2.07)	64.4 (2.54)	65.5 (2.58)	72.1 (2.84)	76.6 (3.02)	89.7 (3.53)	82.2 (3.24)	91.9 (3.62)	824.3 (32.45)
Average precipitation days (≥ 1.0 mm)	13.8	11.5	11.3	10.0	9.8	10.4	11.0	12.2	11.8	14.4	15.5	15.4	146.9
Average snowy days	6	5	4	2	0	0	0	0	0	0	1	4	22
Average relative humidity (%)	85.1	83.5	80.7	77.9	76.6	78.9	79.0	80.1	81.9	84.6	85.1	85.6	80.8
Mean monthly sunshine hours	56.0	70.3	105.1	154.2	207.0	191.5	197.0	175.2	132.7	97.3	65.8	46.8	1,499.1
Mean daily daylight hours	8.2	9.9	11.9	14.1	15.9	16.9	16.4	14.7	12.7	10.5	8.6	7.6	12.3
Average ultraviolet index	0	1	2	4	5	6	6	5	4	2	1	0	3
Source 1: Met Office
Source 2: National Oceanography Centre WeatherAtlas CEDA Archive

=== Human ===
==== Suburbs and districts ====
Suburbs and districts of Liverpool include:

- Aigburth
- Allerton
- Anfield
- Belle Vale
- Broadgreen
- Canning
- Childwall
- Chinatown
- City Centre
- Clubmoor
- Croxteth
- Dingle
- Dovecot
- Edge Hill
- Everton
- Fairfield
- Fazakerley
- Garston
- Gateacre
- Gillmoss
- Grassendale
- Hunt's Cross
- Kensington
- Kirkdale
- Knotty Ash
- Mossley Hill
- Netherley
- Norris Green
- Oglet
- Old Swan
- Orrell Park
- St Michael's Hamlet
- Speke
- Stoneycroft
- Toxteth
- Tuebrook
- Vauxhall
- Walton
- Wavertree
- West Derby
- Woolton

==== Green Liverpool ====
UK core cities – Population and population density (Number of usual residents per km^{2}) (2021)
Core City	Population	Population density
Birmingham	1,144,900	4275.4
Leeds	812,000	1471.7
Glasgow	635,130	3637.0
Sheffield	556,500	1512.5
Manchester	552,000	4772.7
Liverpool	486,100	4346.1
Bristol	472,400	4308.1
Cardiff	362,400	2571.3
Belfast	345,418	2597.8
Nottingham	323,700	4337.6
Newcastle	300,200	2646.1

In 2010, Liverpool City Council and the Primary Care Trust commissioned the Mersey Forest to complete "A Green Infrastructure Strategy" for the city.

==== Green belt ====
Liverpool is a core urban element of a green belt region that extends into the wider surrounding counties, which is in place to reduce urban sprawl, prevent the towns in the conurbation from further convergence, protect the identity of outlying communities, encourage brownfield reuse, and preserve nearby countryside. This is achieved by restricting inappropriate development within the designated areas and imposing stricter conditions on permitted building.

Due to being already highly built up, the city contains limited portions of protected green belt area within greenfield throughout the borough at Fazakerley, Croxteth Hall and country park and Craven Wood, Woodfields Park and nearby golf courses in Netherley, small greenfield tracts east of the Speke area by the St Ambrose primary school, and the small hamlet of Oglet and the surrounding area south of Liverpool Airport.

The green belt was first drawn up in 1983 under Merseyside County Council and the size in the city amounts to 530 hectares (5.3 km^{2}; 2.0 mi^{2}).

== Demonyms ==
=== Scouser ===
Since the mid-20th century, Scouser has become the predominant demonym for the inhabitants of Liverpool, and is strongly associated with the Scouse accent and dialect of the city. The Scouse accent is described as progressively diverging from the Lancastrian accent in the late 19th century.

The etymology of Scouser is derived from the traditional dish Scouse brought to the area by sailors travelling through Liverpool's port.

=== Earlier demonyms ===
Earlier terms used to refer to inhabitants of Liverpool include:

- Liverpoldon (17th century)
- Leeirpooltonian (17th century)
- Liverpolitan (19th century)
- Liverpudlian (19th century to present)

Professor Tony Crowley writes that up until the 1950s, inhabitants of Liverpool were generally referred to by a number of demonyms, including, in the mid-20th century, the rival terms of 'Liverpolitan' and 'Liverpudlian'. Debate surrounded the lexicology of these terms and their connotations of social class.

Professor John Belchem suggests that a series of other nicknames such as 'Dick Liver', 'Dicky Sam' and 'whacker' were used, but gradually fell out of use. Belchem and Philip Boland suggest that comedic radio presenters and entertainers brought the Liverpool identity to a national audience, which in turn encouraged locals to be gradually more known as 'scousers'. By the time that Frank Shaw's My Liverpool, a Celebration of 'Scousetown' was published in 1971, Belchem argues, 'Scouser' had firmly become the dominant demonym.

== Demography ==
=== Population ===
Historical population of Liverpool (numbers vary by source) Sources:
Date	Population	Notes
1207		Borough of Liverpool founded by John, King of England. The economy was focused on agricultural and food processing, grain mills and warehouses until the 16th century.
1272	840	
14th century	1,000 – 1,200	Population roughly 1,000 in 1300. Because Liverpool was a port, it was more at risk from the spread of disease. Townspeople lived partly by farming and fishing. Some were craftsmen or tradesmen such as bakers, brewers, butchers, blacksmiths, and carpenters. A watermill existed to ground grain into flour for the townspeople's bread, and there was a windmill. Black Death wiped out whole families and bodies were buried in a mass grave at St Nicholas's churchyard.
16th century		Ireland was still Liverpool's main trading partner. In 1540, a writer said: "Irish merchants come much hither as to a good harbor". He also said there was "good merchandise at Liverpool and much Irish yarn, that Manchester men buy there". Skins and hides were still imported from Ireland. Exports from Liverpool included coal, woolen cloth, knives and leather goods. There were still many fishermen in Liverpool. In the mid 16th century, the town was under the control of the country gentry and trade was slow. The population dropped to below 600, in part due to deaths in the 1558 plague when a third of the townspeople died. Further plague outbreaks took place in 1609, 1647 and 1650 which led to static or retrogressive population levels. The town was regarded as subordinate to Chester until the 1650s.
1600	<2,000	English troops bound for rebellions in Ireland settled in the 16th and early 17th centuries.
1626		Charles I of England issued new Charter for the town. Trade with other cities, Ireland, Isle of Man, France and Spain increased. Fish and wool was exported to the Continent, and wines, iron and other commodities imported. In the following decades, merchants invested in Liverpool and its importance grew. Regular shipping began to America and West Indies. Liverpool was controlled by the Crown, the Molyneux and Stanley families.
1642	2,500	Liverpool overtook Chester in exporting coal and salt in early 17th century, especially to Ireland.
1644		During English Civil War, Prince Rupert led a royalist army to capture Liverpool. He described the town as a "mere crow's nest which a parcel of boys could take". He stormed Liverpool Castle in the 'Siege of Liverpool' with considerable slaughter.
1647		Liverpool was made a free and independent port, no longer subject to Chester.
1648		First recorded cargo from America landed at Liverpool.
Late 17th century		Liverpool grew rapidly with the growth of English colonies in North America and West Indies. Liverpool was well placed to trade across Atlantic Ocean. The writer Celia Fiennes visited Liverpool and said: "Liverpool is built on the River Mersey. It is mostly newly built, of brick and stone after the London fashion. The original (town) was a few fishermen's houses. It has now grown into a large, fine town. It is but one parish with one church though there be 24 streets in it, there is indeed a little chapel and there are a great many dissenters in the town (Protestants who did not belong to the Church of England). It's a very rich trading town, the houses are of brick and stone, built high and even so that a street looks very handsome. The streets are well paved. There is an abundance of persons who are well dressed and fashionable. The streets are fair and long. It's London in miniature as much as I ever saw anything. There is a very pretty exchange. It stands on 8 pillars, over which is a very handsome Town Hall."
1700	5,714	First recorded Liverpool slave ship, the 'Liverpool Merchant', sold a cargo of 220 slaves in Barbados. In the early 1700s, the writer Daniel Defoe said: "Liverpool has an opulent, flourishing and increasing trade to Virginia and English colonies in America. They trade around the whole island (of Great Britain), send ships to Norway, to Hamburg, and to the Baltic as also to Holland and Flanders (roughly modern Belgium)." Welsh people in search of work and opportunity made up a large amount of population in the early 18th century.
1715		World's first wet dock opened in Liverpool, symbolising a new era in the town's growth, the starting point of the 18th-century boom in Liverpool's fortunes.
1720s		Liverpool Castle demolished (built in the 1230s)
1750	20,000	
1795		Influx of Irish, Welsh, Scandinavian and Dutch communities grew the town rapidly. Most of the population were not native to Liverpool.
1797	77,708	
1801	77,000 – 85,000	
1811	94,376	
1821	118,972	
1831	165,175	
1835		Boundary of Liverpool expanded to include Everton, Kirkdale and parts of Toxteth and West Derby. Liverpool was second only to London in importance. Poor, overcrowded and unsanitary living conditions led to disease and epidemics of cholera in 1830s to 1860s.
1841	286,487	
1851	375,955	At the height of the Great Famine in Ireland, Liverpool's Irish-born population peaked to about 83,000–90,000. Forty-three thousand were settled in the area around the docks. More Irish people lived in Liverpool than the majority of Irish towns. Forty per cent of the world's trade was passing through Liverpool's docks.
1861	413,000 – 462,749	
1871	493,405 – 539,248	
1880		Liverpool officially became a city.
1881	552,508 – 648,616	
1891	617,032 – 644,243	
1895		Boundary of Liverpool expanded to include Wavertree, Walton, and parts of Toxteth and West Derby.
1901	684,958 – 711,030	
1902		Boundary of Liverpool expanded to include Garston, Aigburth, Cressington and Grassendale.
1904		Boundary of Liverpool expanded to include Fazakerley.
1907	746,144	
1911	746,421 – 766,044	
1913		Boundary of Liverpool expanded to include Woolton and Gateacre.
1921	805,046 – 821,000	
1931	855,688	
1937	867,000	The highest-recorded population of Liverpool city proper
1941	806,271	Liverpool's population fell in the following decades, largely due to the new towns movement and the British government's policy to displace thousands of people from major British cities (including Central Liverpool) to various new towns within the region such as Kirkby, Skelmersdale, Runcorn and Warrington.
1951	765,641 – 768,337	
1961	683,133 – 737,637	
1971	595,252 – 607,454	Suburbanisation into neighbouring local authorities continues.
1981	492,164 – 503,726	
1991	448,629 – 480,196	
2001	439,428 – 439,476	Liverpool's population steadily increased again, partly attributed to a rise in students, student accommodation, young professionals, and increased job opportunities through urban regeneration.
2011	466,415	
2021	486,100	

==== The city ====
The city of Liverpool is at the core of a much larger and more populous metropolitan area; however, at the most recent UK Census in 2021, the area governed by Liverpool City Council had a population of 486,100, a 4.2% increase from the previous Census in 2011. This figure increased to 500,500 people by 2022, according to data from Liverpool City Council.

Taking in to account how local government is organised within the cities and metropolitan areas of England, the Liverpool was the fifth largest of England's 'core cities' and had the second-overall-highest population density of those, by 2021.

The population of the city has steadily risen since the 2001 Census. As well as having a growing population, the population density also grew at the 2021 Census compared to the previous census. Since 2011, its population size ranked 10th out of 309 local authority areas.

The population of the city is comparatively younger than that of England as a whole. Family life in the city is also growing at odds with the North West England region as a whole: At the 2021 Census, the percentage of households including a couple without children increased in Liverpool, but fell across the North West. The percentage of people aged 16 years and over (excluding full-time students) who were employed also increased in Liverpool compared to the overall North West region where it fell.

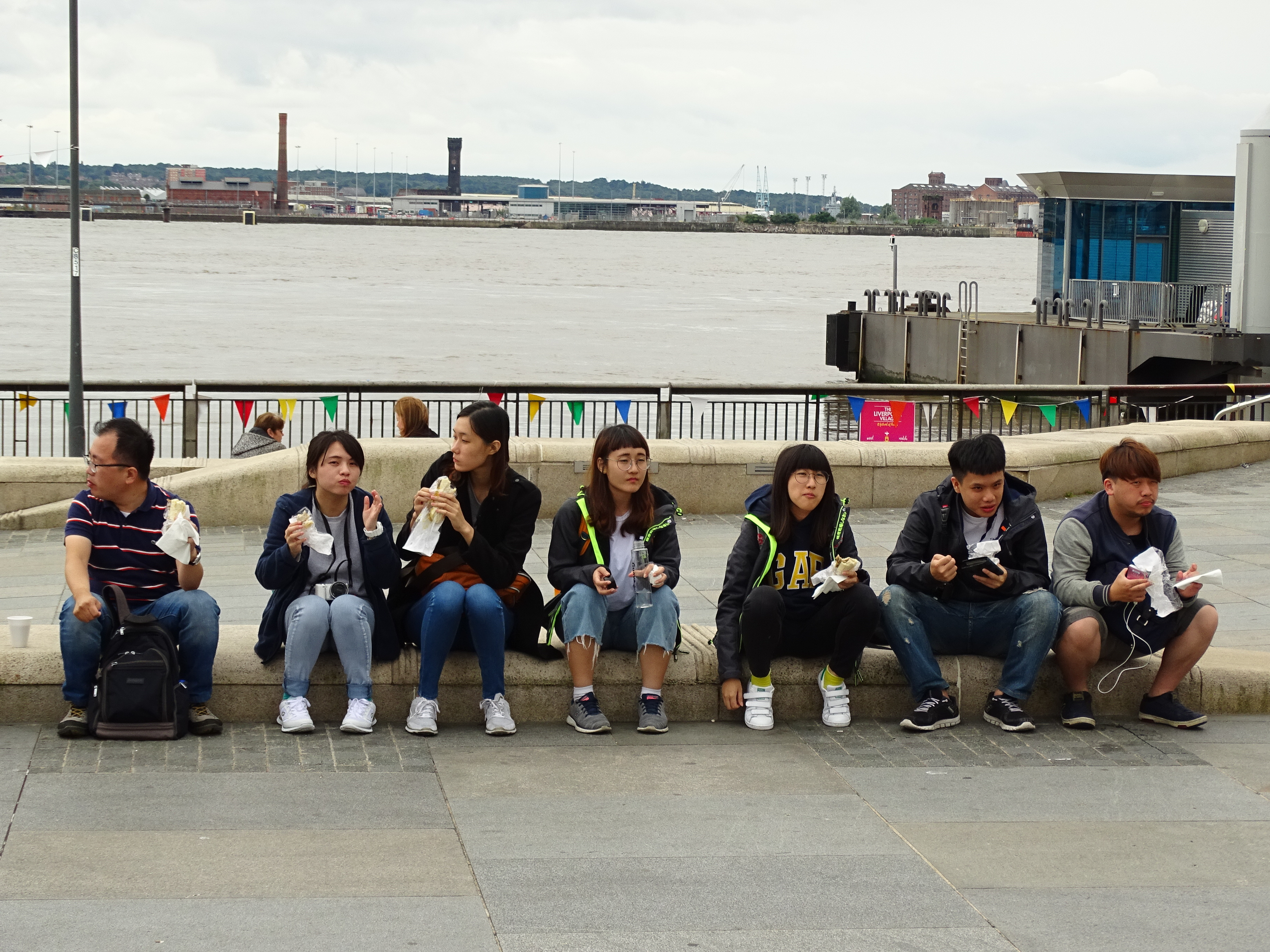
Liverpool's ethnic and international population is growing. More people in the city identified as Asian and Black in the most recent census, compared to the previous census.

The 2021 Census also showed that Liverpool's ethnic and international population was growing. The number of residents in the city born outside of England has increased since the previous census, while the number of residents who did not identify with any national identity associated with the UK has also increased at a faster rate than England as a whole. The overall share of the city's population who identified as Asian and Black increased, while the percentage who identified as white decreased in the city compared with previous Census.

It has been argued that the city can claim to have one of the strongest Irish heritages in the United Kingdom, with as many as 75 per cent (estimated) of Liverpool's population with some form of Irish ancestry.

The growing population of Liverpool in the 21st century reverses a trend which took place between the 1930s and 2001, when the population of the city proper effectively halved.

At the 1931 United Kingdom census, Liverpool's population reached an all-time high of 846,302. Following this peak, in response to central government policy, the Council authority of Liverpool then built and owned large several 'new town' council estates in the suburbs within Liverpool's metropolitan area. Tens of thousands of people were systematically relocated to new housing in areas such as Halton, Knowsley, St Helens, Sefton, Wirral, Cheshire West and Chester, West Lancashire, Warrington and as far as North Wales.

Such a mass relocation and population loss during this time was common practice for many British cities, including London and Manchester, In contrast, satellite towns such as Kirkby, Skelmersdale and Runcorn saw a corresponding rise in their populations (Kirkby being the fastest growing town in Britain during the 1960s).

==== Urban and metropolitan area ====
Liverpool is typically grouped with the wider Merseyside (plus Halton) area for the purpose of defining its metropolitan footprint, and there are several methodologies. Sometimes, this metropolitan area is broadened to encompass urban settlements in the neighbouring counties of Lancashire and Cheshire.

The Office for National Statistics in the United Kingdom uses the international standardised International Territorial Levels (ITLs) to divide up the economic territory of the UK. This enables the ONS to calculate regional and local statistics and data. The ONS uses a series of codes to identify these areas. In order of hierarchy from largest area to smallest area, Liverpool is part of the following regions:

===== ITL 1 region =====
North West England (code TLD)
At the 2021 Census, the ITL 1 region of North West England had a usual resident population of 7,417,300.

===== ITL 2 region =====
Merseyside (code TLD7)
The ITL 2 region of Merseyside is defined as the area comprising East Merseyside (TLD71) plus Liverpool (TLD72), Sefton (TLD73) and Wirral (TLD74).
At the 2021 Census, the population of this area was as follows:

East Merseyside (TLD71):

- Halton = 128,200
- Knowsley = 154,500
- St. Helens = 183,200

Liverpool (TLD72) = 486,100

Sefton (TLD73) = 279,300

Wirral (TLD74) = 320,200

Therefore, the total population of the ITL 2 Merseyside region was 1,551,500 based on the 2021 Census.

===== ITL 3 region =====
The smallest ITL 3 area classed as Liverpool (code TLD72), therefore, had a population of 486,100 at the 2021 Census.

===== Other definitions =====
At the 2021 Census, the ONS used a refreshed concept of built-up areas (BUAs) based on the physical built environment, using satellite imagery to recognise developed land, such as cities, towns and villages. This allows the ONS to investigate economic and social statistics based on actual settlements where most people live. Data from the 2021 Census is not directly comparable with 2011 Census data due to this revised methodology. Using the population figures of BUAs at the 2021 Census (excluding London), Liverpool Built-up Area is the third largest in England with some 506,565 usual residents (behind only Birmingham and Leeds). Liverpool's built-up area is, therefore, larger than the major English cities of Bristol, Manchester, Newcastle upon Tyne, Nottingham and Sheffield.

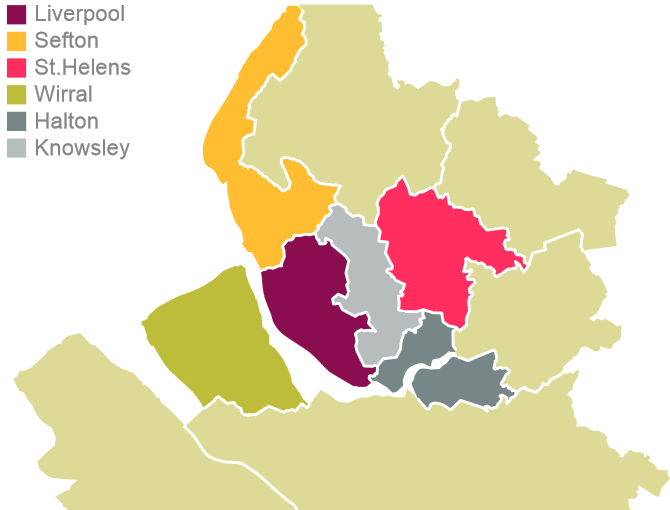
Map showing the six boroughs of Liverpool City Region: the fourth-largest combined authority area in England.

Excluding London, the Liverpool City Region was the fourth-largest combined authority area in England, by 2021. The population is approximately 1.6 million. The Liverpool City Region is a political and economic partnership between local authorities including Liverpool, plus the Metropolitan boroughs of Knowsley, Sefton, St Helens, Wirral and the Borough of Halton. The Liverpool City Region Combined Authority exercises strategic governance powers for the region in many areas. The economic data of the Liverpool city region is of particular policy interest to the Office for National Statistics, particularly as the British Government continuously explores the potential to negotiate increased devolved powers for each combined authority area.

A 2011 report, Liverpool City Region – Building on its Strengths, by Michael Heseltine and Terry Leahy, stated that "what is now called Liverpool City Region has a population of around 1.5 million", but also referred to "an urban region that spreads from Wrexham and Flintshire to Chester, Warrington, West Lancashire and across to Southport", with a population of 2.3 million.

In 2006, in an attempt to harmonise the series of metropolitan areas across the European Union, ESPON (now European Observation Network for Territorial Development and Cohesion) released a study defining a "Liverpool/Birkenhead Metropolitan area" with an estimated population of 2.241 million people. The metro area comprised a functional urban area consisting of a contiguous urban sprawl, labour pool, and commuter Travel to work areas. The analysis defined this metropolitan area as Liverpool itself, combined with the surrounding areas of Birkenhead, Wigan/Ashton, Warrington, Widnes/Runcorn, Chester, Southport, Ellesmere Port, Ormskirk and Skelmersdale.

Liverpool and Manchester are sometimes considered as one large polynuclear metropolitan area, or megalopolis.

=== Ethnicity ===
In recent decades, Liverpool's population is becoming more multicultural. According to the 2021 census, 77% of all Liverpool residents described their ethnic group as White English, Welsh, Scottish, Northern Irish or British. The remaining 23% were described as non-White English/British. Between 2011 and 2021, there was population growth across all ethnic groups, except 'White English/British' and 'Any Other', where there were overall losses. The number of 'Other White residents' in Liverpool also increased by almost 12,000 people, with notable increases in the 'Other Asian', 'Arab', and 'Other Mixed/Multiple' population categories. The non-White English/British population as a percentage of the total population across the 'newly organised city electoral wards' ranged from 5% in the Orrell Park ward to 69% in the Princes Park ward. Nine out of ten Liverpool residents regarded English as their main language. The most spoken non-English languages in the city were Arabic (5,743 main speakers) followed by Polish (4,809 main speakers). Overall, almost 45,000 residents had a main language that was not English.

Ethnic breakdown in Liverpool – (UK Census 2021)
Ethnic group	Population	
Ethnic group	Number	Percentage
White: English, Welsh, Scottish, Northern Irish or British	375,785	77.3
White: Other White	24,162	5.0
Black, Black British, Black Welsh, Caribbean or African: African	12,709	2.6
Asian, Asian British or Asian Welsh: Chinese	8,841	1.8
Other ethnic group: Arab	8,312	1.7
Other ethnic group: Any other ethnic group	7,722	1.6
Asian, Asian British or Asian Welsh: Other Asian	7,085	1.5
White: Irish	6,826	1.4
Asian, Asian British or Asian Welsh: Indian	6,251	1.3
Mixed or multiple ethnic groups: Other mixed or multiple ethnic groups	4,934	1.0
Mixed or multiple ethnic groups: White and Black African	4,157	0.9
Mixed or multiple ethnic groups: White and Black Caribbean	4,127	0.8
Asian, Asian British or Asian Welsh: Pakistani	3,673	0.8
Mixed or multiple ethnic groups: White and Asian	3,662	0.8
Black, Black British, Black Welsh, Caribbean or African: Other Black	2,762	0.6
Asian, Asian British or Asian Welsh: Bangladeshi	1,917	0.4
Black, Black British, Black Welsh, Caribbean or African: Caribbean	1,493	0.3
White: Roma	1,169	0.2
White: Gypsy or Irish Traveller	501	0.1

According to a 2014 survey, the ten most popular surnames of Liverpool and their occurrence in the population are:

1. Jones – 23,012
2. Smith – 16,276
3. Williams – 13,997
4. Davies – 10,149
5. Hughes – 9,787
6. Roberts – 9,571
7. Taylor – 8,219
8. Johnson – 6,715
9. Brown – 6,603
10. Murphy – 6,495

Liverpool is home to the UK's oldest black community, dating back to at least the 1730s. Some Liverpudlians can trace their black ancestry in the city back ten generations. Early Black settlers in the city included seamen, the children of traders sent to be educated, and freed slaves, since slaves entering the country after 1722 were deemed free men. Since the 20th century, Liverpool is also noted for its large African-Caribbean, Ghanaian, and Somali communities, formed of more recent African-descended immigrants and their subsequent generations.

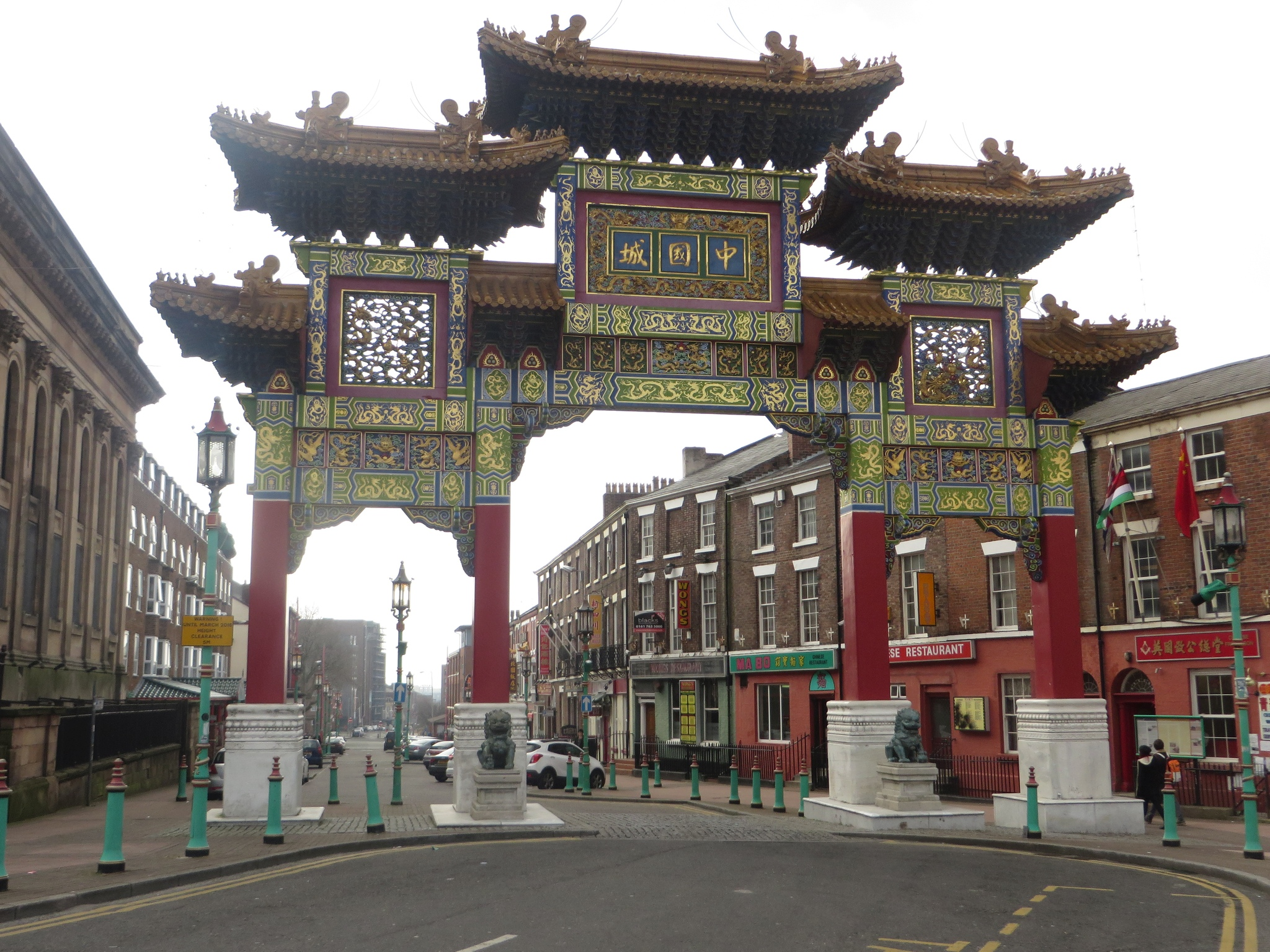
Liverpool has the oldest Chinese community in Europe and the largest Chinese arch outside China.

The city is also home to the oldest Chinese community in Europe; the first residents of the city's Chinatown arrived as seamen in the 19th century. The traditional Chinese gateway erected in Liverpool's Chinatown is the largest such gateway outside China. Liverpool also has a long-standing Filipino community. Lita Roza, a singer from Liverpool who was the first woman to achieve a UK number one hit, had Filipino ancestry.

The city is also known for its large Irish and Welsh populations. In 1813, 10 per cent of Liverpool's population was Welsh, leading to the city becoming known as "the capital of North Wales."

During, and in the decades following, the Great Irish Famine in the mid-19th century, up to two million Irish people travelled to Liverpool within one decade, with many subsequently departing for the United States. By 1851, more than 20 per cent of the population of Liverpool was Irish. At the 2001 Census, 1.17 per cent of the population were Welsh-born and 0.75 per cent were born in the Republic of Ireland, while 0.54 per cent were born in Northern Ireland, but many more Liverpudlians are of legacy Welsh or Irish ancestry.

Other contemporary ethnicities include Indian, Latin American, Malaysian, and Yemeni communities, which number several thousand each.

=== Religion ===
Religion of Liverpool residents, 2021
Christian	57.3%
No religion	29.4%
Religion not stated	5.9%
Muslim	5.3%
Hindu	0.8%
Buddhist	0.4%
Any other religion	0.4%
Jewish	0.4%
Sikh	0.1%
Source: 2021 census

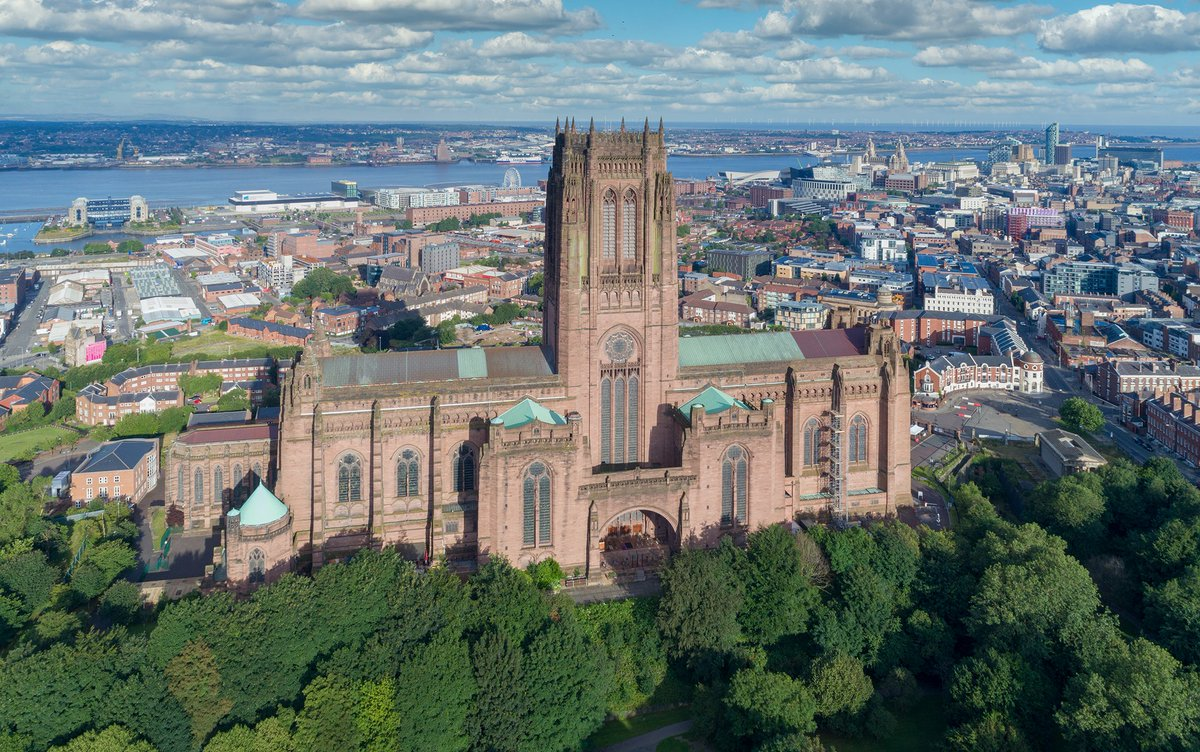
Liverpool Anglican Cathedral, one of the largest cathedrals in the world

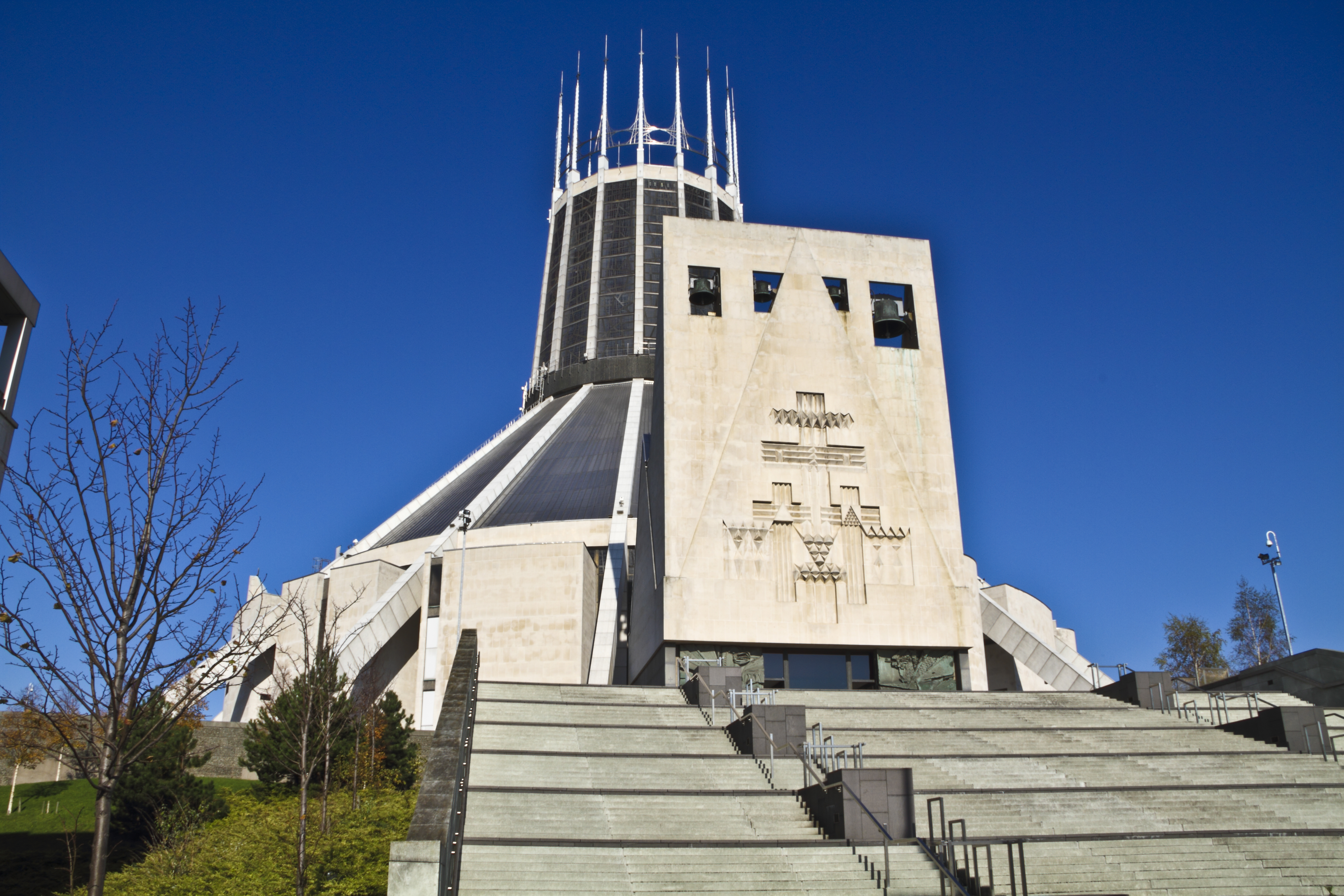
Liverpool Metropolitan Cathedral of Christ the King

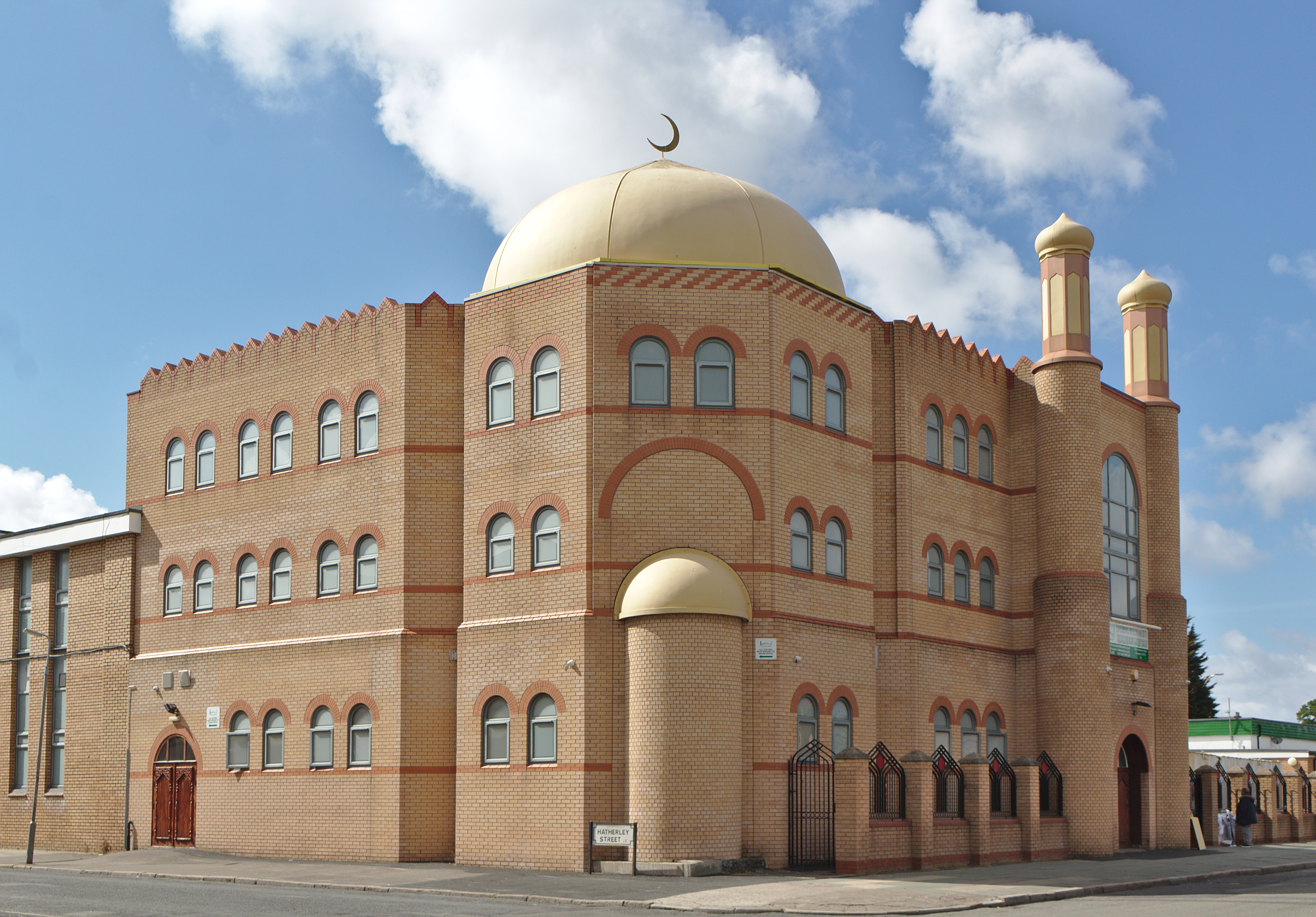
The Al-Rahma Mosque in the Toxteth area of Liverpool

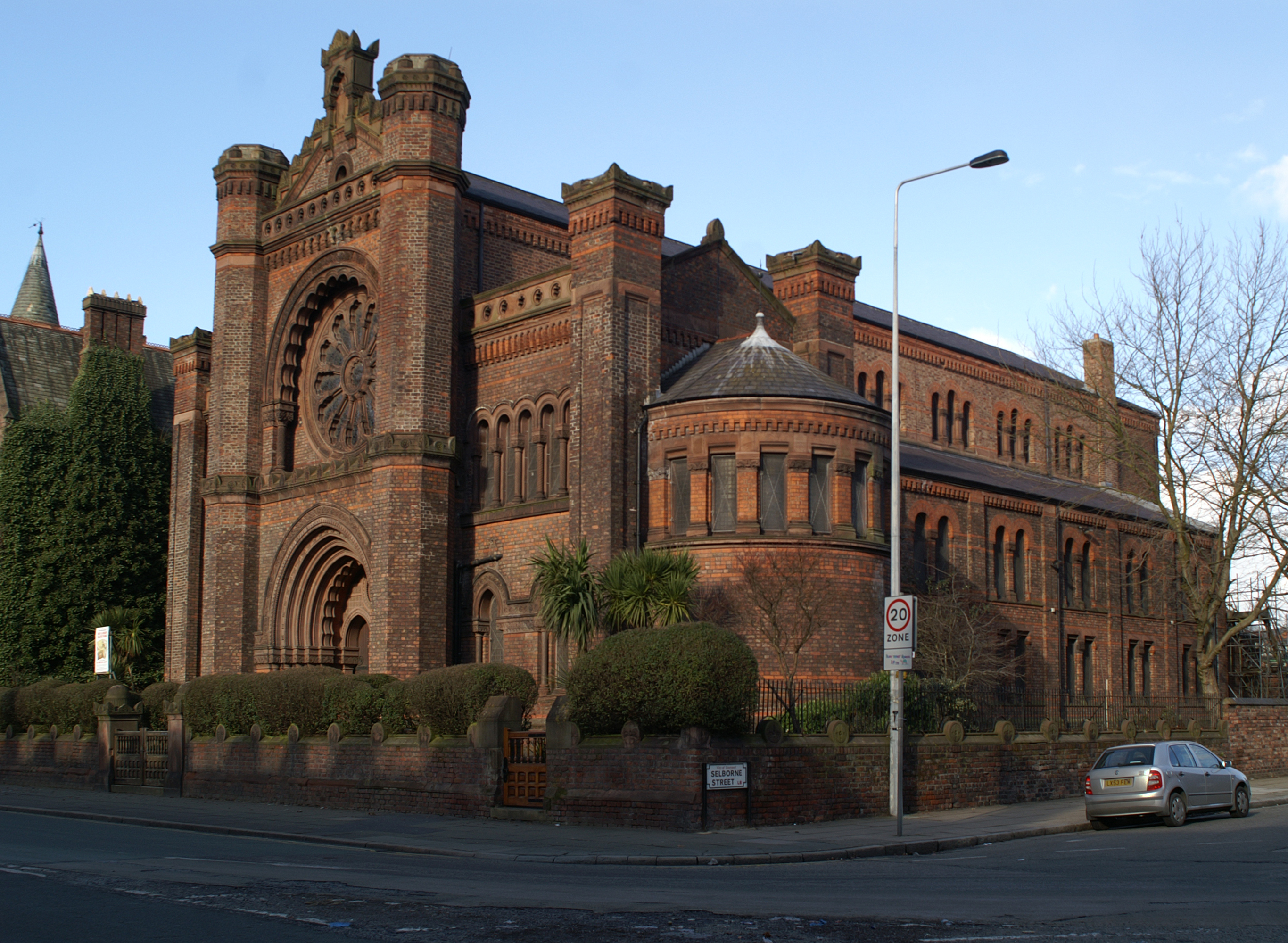
Princes Road Synagogue, Toxteth

The thousands of migrants and sailors passing through Liverpool resulted in a religious diversity that is still apparent today. This is reflected in the equally diverse collection of religious buildings, including two Christian cathedrals.

Liverpool is known to be England's 'most Catholic city', with a Catholic population much larger than in other parts of England. This is mainly due to high historic Irish migration to the city and their descendants since.

The parish church of Liverpool is the Anglican Our Lady and St Nicholas, colloquially known as "the sailors church", which has existed near the waterfront since 1257. It regularly plays host to Catholic masses. Other notable churches include the Greek Orthodox Church of St Nicholas (built in the Neo-Byzantine architecture style) and the Gustav Adolf Church (the Swedish Seamen's Church, reminiscent of Nordic styles).

Liverpool's wealth as a port city enabled the construction of two enormous cathedrals in the 20th century. The Anglican Cathedral, which was designed by Sir Giles Gilbert Scott and plays host to the annual Liverpool Shakespeare Festival, has one of the longest naves, largest organs and heaviest and highest peals of bells in the world. The Roman Catholic Metropolitan Cathedral, on Mount Pleasant next to Liverpool Science Park, was initially planned to be even larger. Of Sir Edwin Lutyens's original design, only the crypt was completed. The cathedral was eventually built to a simpler design by Sir Frederick Gibberd. While this is on a smaller scale than Lutyens' original design, it still incorporates the largest panel of stained glass in the world. The road running between the two cathedrals is called Hope Street. The cathedral has long been colloquially referred to as "Paddy's Wigwam" due to its shape.

Liverpool contains several synagogues, of which the Grade I listed Moorish Revival Princes Road Synagogue is architecturally the most notable. Princes Road is widely considered to be the most magnificent of Britain's Moorish Revival synagogues and one of the finest buildings in Liverpool. Liverpool has a thriving Jewish community with a further two orthodox Synagogues, one in the Allerton district of the city and a second in the Childwall district of the city where a significant Jewish community reside. A third orthodox Synagogue in the Greenbank Park area of L17 has recently closed and is a listed 1930s structure. There is also a Lubavitch Chabad House and a reform synagogue. Liverpool has had a Jewish community since the mid-18th century. The Jewish population of Liverpool is around 5,000. The Liverpool Talmudical College existed from 1914 until 1990, when its classes moved to the Childwall Synagogue.

Liverpool also has a Hindu community, with a Mandir on Edge Lane, Edge Hill. The Shri Radha Krishna Temple from the Hindu Cultural Organisation in Liverpool is located there. Liverpool also has the Guru Nanak Sikh Gurdwara in Wavertree and a Baháʼí Centre in the same area.

The city had the earliest Mosque in England and possibly the UK, founded in 1887 by William Abdullah Quilliam, a lawyer who had converted to Islam who set up the Liverpool Muslim Institute in a terraced house on West Derby Road. Apart from the first mosque in England which now houses a museum, the largest and main one, Al-Rahma mosque, was also the third purpose-built mosque in the United Kingdom. The second largest mosque in Liverpool is the Masjid Al-Taiseer. Other mosques in the city include the Bait ul Lateef Ahmadiyya Mosque, Hamza Center (Community Center), Islamic community centre, Liverpool Mosque and Islamic Institute, Liverpool Towhid Centre, Masjid Annour, and the Shah Jalal Mosque.

== Economy ==
=== City and region ===
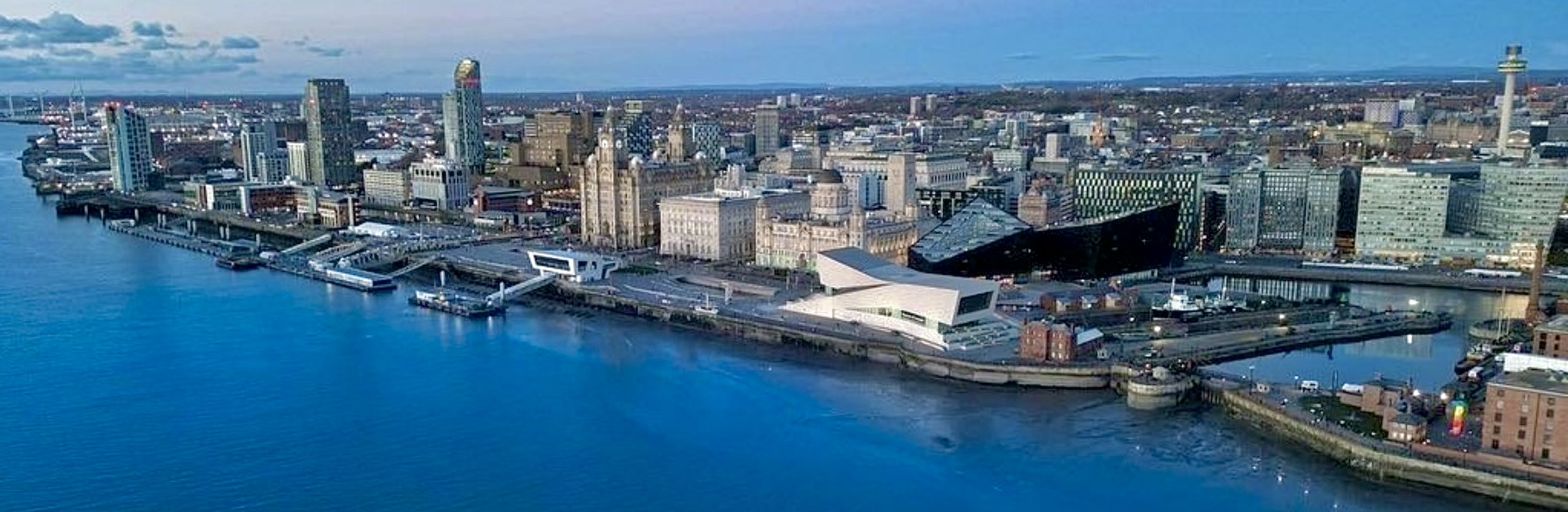
Liverpool is a major component of the third largest regional economy in the United Kingdom. Important sectors in the city include the knowledge economy, maritime industry, tourism, culture, hospitality, healthcare industry, life sciences, the creative and digital sectors.

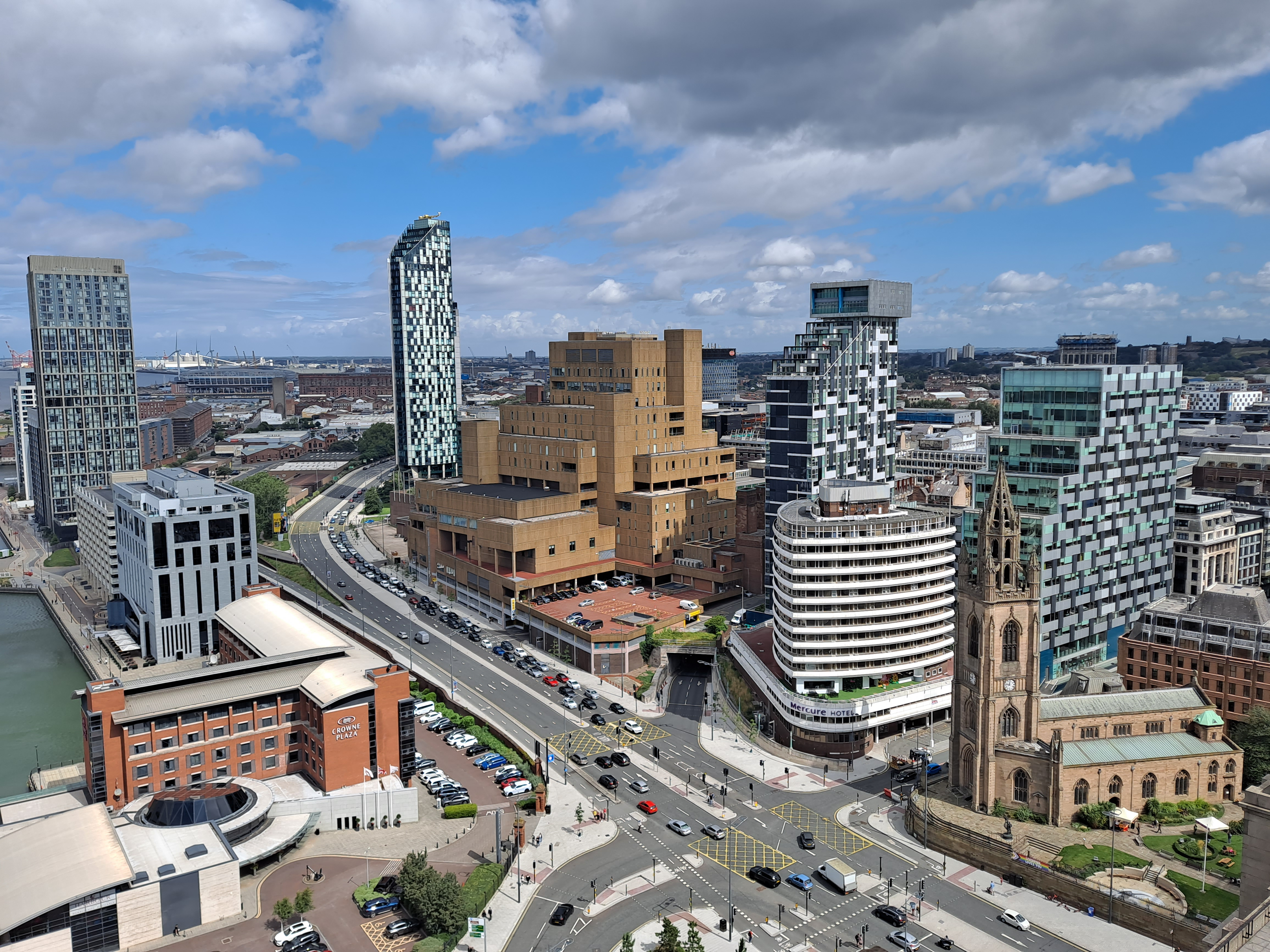
Liverpool skyline showing the Commercial District

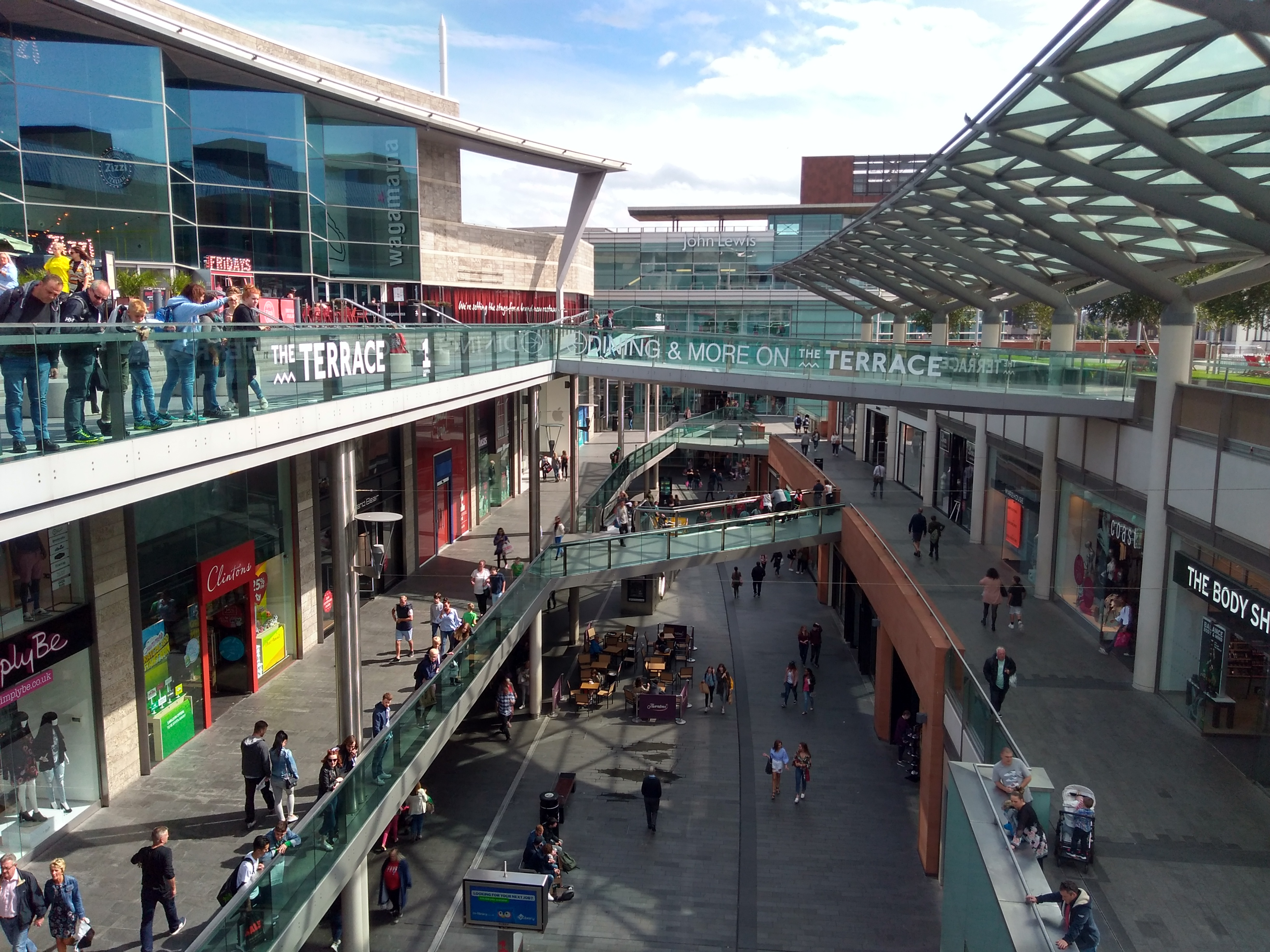
Liverpool is one of the top retail destinations in the UK

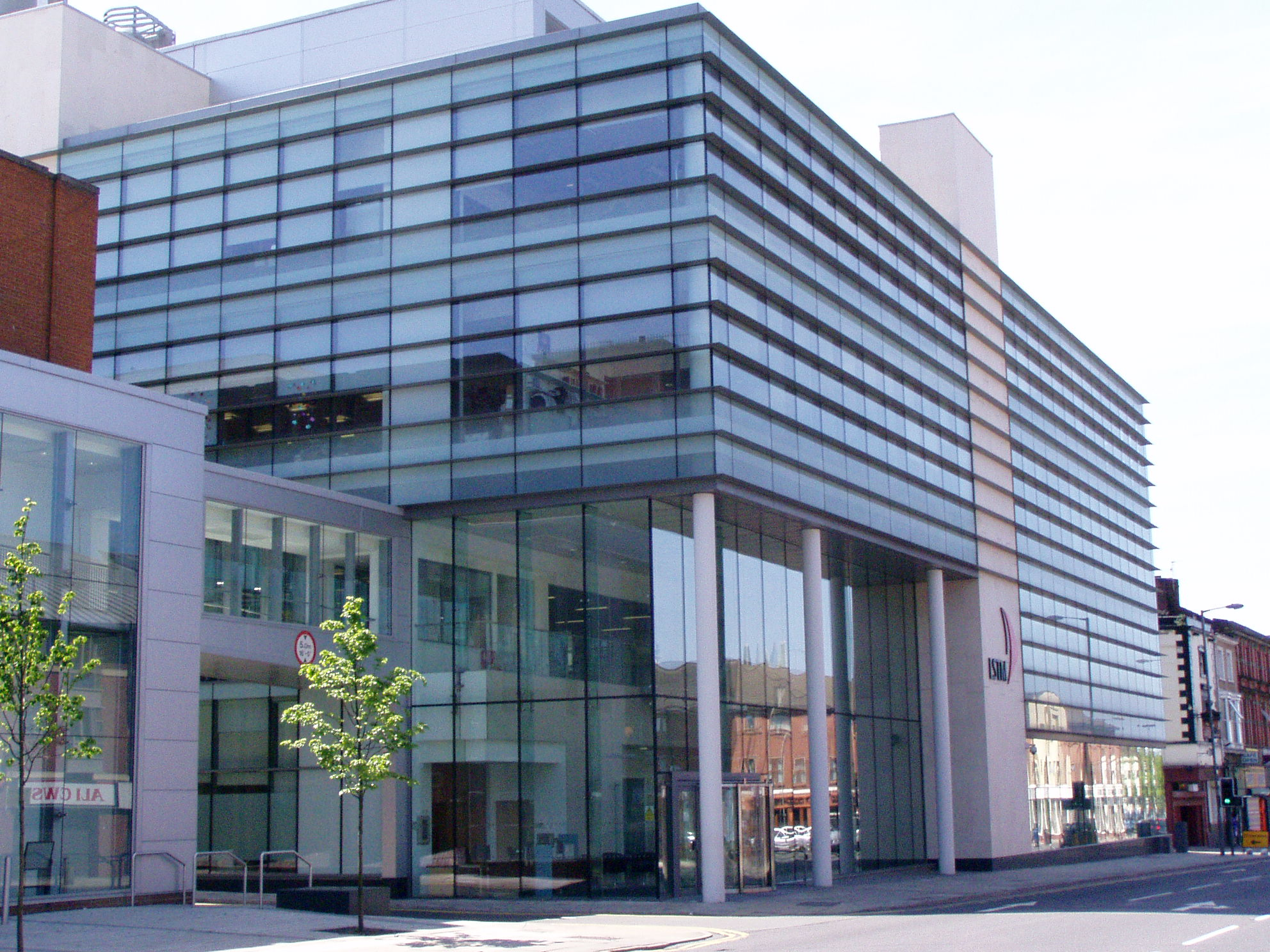
Knowledge Quarter, Liverpool hosts globally significant institutions

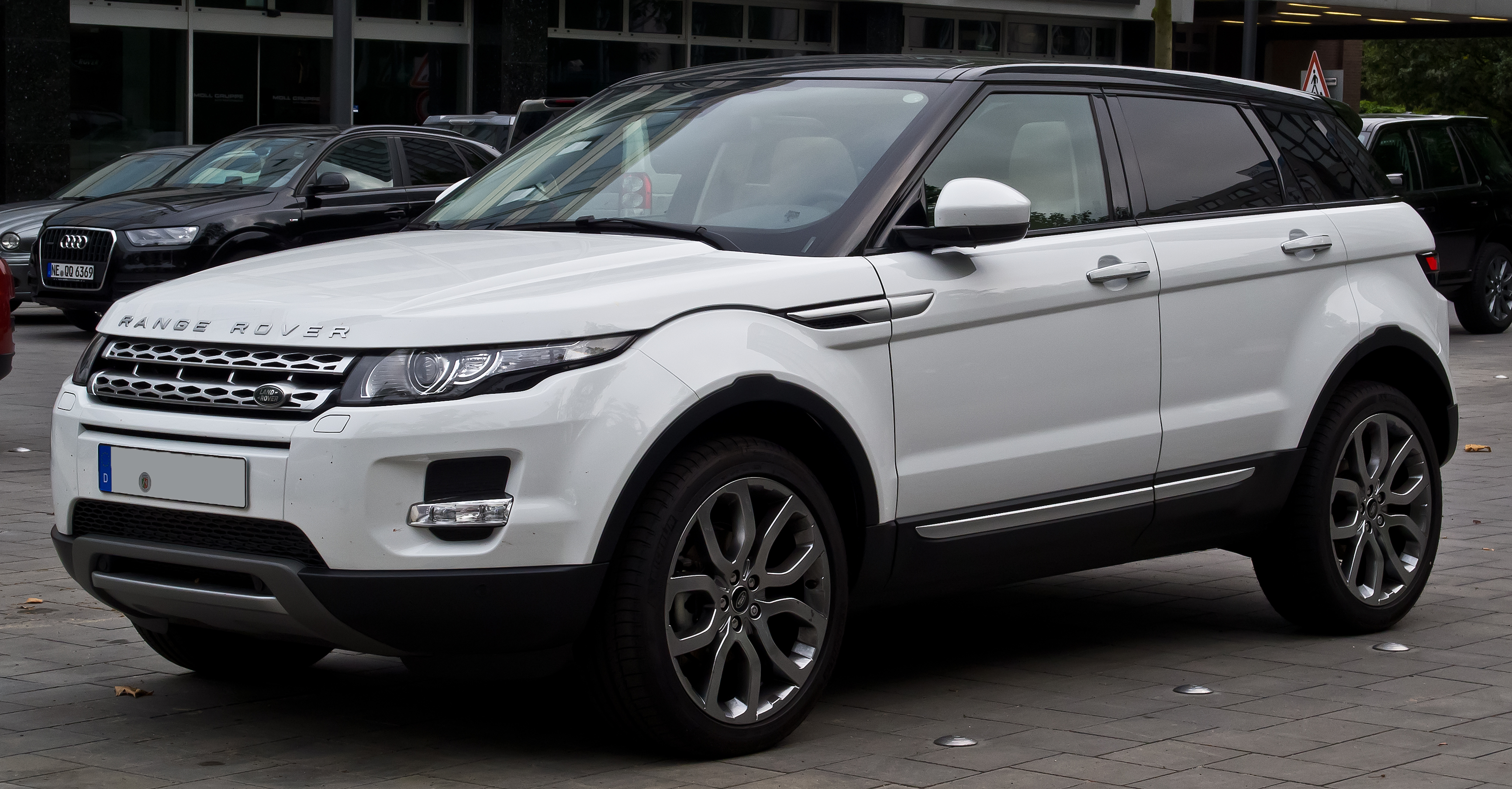
The Range Rover Evoque is manufactured at Jaguar Land Rover Halewood

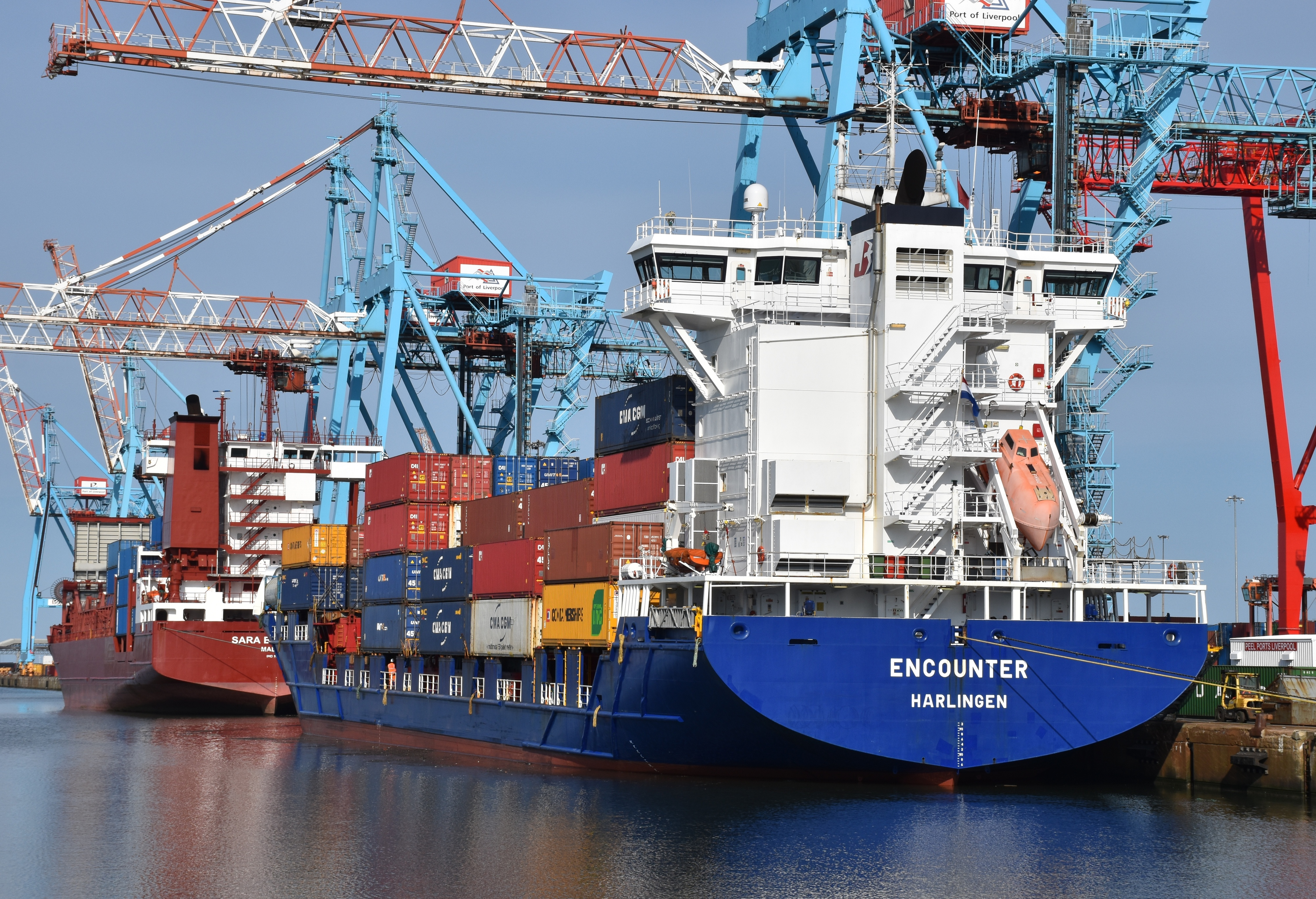
The Port of Liverpool is the 4th largest port in the UK

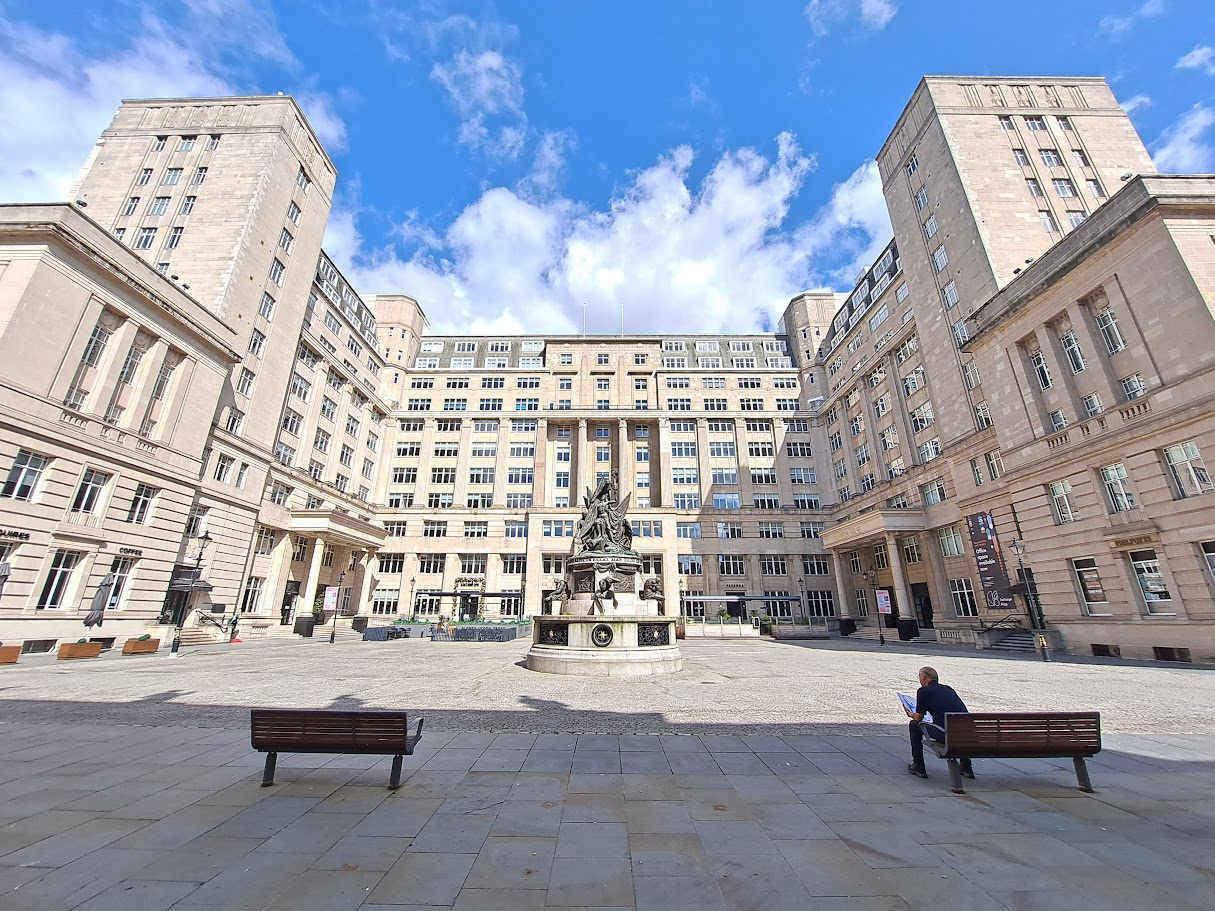
Liverpool is home to many global headquarters and major branch offices

Liverpool forms an integral part of North West England's economy, the third largest regional economy in the United Kingdom. The city is also a major contributor to the economy of Liverpool City Region, worth over £40 billion per year.

The local authority area governed by Liverpool City Council accounts for 39% of the Liverpool city region's total jobs, 40% of its total GVA and 35% of its total businesses. At the local authority level, the city's GVA (balanced) at current basic prices was £14.3 billion in 2021. Its GDP at current market prices was £15.9 billion. This equates to £32,841 per head of the population.

At the 2021 United Kingdom census, 51.1% of Liverpool's population aged 16 years and over was classed as employed, 44.2% economically inactive and 4.8% unemployed. Of those employed, the most popular industries providing the employment were human health and social work activities (18.7%), wholesale and retail trade; repair of motor vehicles and motor cycles (15%), education (10.8%), public administration and defence; compulsory social security (7.3%), accommodation and food service activities (6.8%), construction (6.5%), transport and storage (5.8%), manufacturing (5.5%) and professional, scientific and technical activities (5.2%).

According to the ONS Business Register and Employment Survey 2021, some industries within Liverpool perform strongly compared to other local authorities in Great Britain. In terms of absolute number of jobs per industry in Great Britain's local authority areas, Liverpool features in the national top 10 for human health and social work activities; arts, entertainment and recreation; public administration and defence; compulsory social security; accommodation and food service activities and real estate activities. Liverpool features in the national top 20 for number of jobs in education; construction; wholesale and retail trade; repair of motor vehicles and motorcycles; transportation and storage; financial and insurance activities and professional, scientific and technical activities.

In 2023, Liverpool City Council set out an economic growth plan for the city over the following 20 years. The City Council will have particular focus on economic sectors such as the visitor economy (tourism), culture, life sciences, digital and creative sectors, and advanced car manufacturing.

According to the International passenger Survey, from the ONS, Liverpool was one of the top 5 most visited cities in the UK by overseas tourists in 2022. As of the same year, the city's tourist industry was worth a total of £3.5 billion annually and was part of a larger city region tourist industry worth £5 billion. A consistent calendar of major events, as well as a plethora of cultural attractions, continue to provide a significant draw for tourists. Tourism related to the Beatles is worth an estimated £100 million to the Liverpool economy each year alone. Liverpool One, as well as a growing retail offer overall, has led to the city being one of the most prominent destinations for shopping in the UK. Liverpool Cruise Terminal, which is situated close to the Pier Head, enables tourists to berth in the centre of the city.

Liverpool is home to the Knowledge Quarter, a 450-acre city centre district that hosts some of the world's most influential institutions in science, health, technology, education, music and the creative performing arts. The UK government has also identified the city as a 'pharmaceutical production superpower' and one of the UK's leading regions for bioprocessing. The accolade led to the government choosing the city for England's second ever 'Investment Zone' in 2023. This will involve millions of pounds being invested over the coming years in to science orientated districts including the Knowledge Quarter and the so-called 'pharma cluster' in the city suburb of Speke. The two clusters form an internationally significant role in infectious disease control. Liverpool City Council also plan to invest in the city's Baltic Triangle, which is renowned in the creative and digital industries.

Car manufacturing also takes place in the city at the Jaguar Land Rover Halewood plant, where the Range Rover Evoque model is assembled. In 2023, Jaguar Land Rover announced that the Halewood plant would begin to shift its focus to electric car production.

Historically, the economy of Liverpool was centred on the city's port and manufacturing base. Today, the Port of Liverpool is the UK's fourth-largest port by tonnage of freight, handling over 30 million tonnes in 2020. The city is also the UK's largest port for transatlantic trade, handling 45% of the country's trade from the United States. In 2023, the city was chosen by the British government to be a designated Freeport to encourage growing international commerce.

The Liverpool2 container terminal, completed in 2022, has greatly increased the volume of cargo which Liverpool is able to handle and has facilitated the world's biggest container vessels.

Liverpool is also home to numerous UK headquarters, or the major strategic branch offices, of many shipping and freight lines including: Atlantic Container Line, Bibby Line, Borchard Lines Ltd, CMA CGM, Hapag-Lloyd, Independent Container Line, Irish Ferries, Maersk Line, Mediterranean Shipping Company and Zim Integrated Shipping Services.

Liverpool's rich architectural base has helped the city become the second most filmed city in the UK outside London. As well as being a featured location in its own right, it often doubles up for Chicago, London, Moscow, New York City, Paris and Rome. The Depot studios, close to the city centre, provide space for film and TV productions.

Major economic projects planned for the city include the revitalisation of disused land in the North docks/Ten Streets area, Liverpool Waters and a new purpose-built TV studio at the former Littlewoods Pools building, adjacent to the Depot.

=== City region economy and devolution ===
The Liverpool City Region GDP in 2021 was £40.479 billion. The six contributing boroughs to this GDP were as follows:
1. Liverpool
  (£15.911 billion) (39.3%)
2. Wirral
  (£6.632 billion) (16.4%)
3. Sefton
  (£5.431 billion) (13.4%)
4. Knowsley
  (£4.557 billion) (11.3%)
5. Halton
  (£4.498 billion) (11.1%)
6. St Helens
  (£3.448 billion) (8.52%)

The policy agenda of the British Government is to continuously monitor the economy and productivity of the UK's core cities within the context of their respective city regions. The government's longer-term plan is to assess each area's potential for increased devolution and transfer of additional powers and budgets from central government in Whitehall to their corresponding combined authorities. As such, official statistics about Liverpool's economy within the context of the Liverpool City Region, are closely monitored by the Office for National Statistics. This allows policy and decision makers to more accurately assess the 'functional economic area' of the city, which is not bound by traditional local government geographies.

As of 2023, there are ten city regions in England with combined authorities. The economy of Liverpool's combined authority area in comparison to the other city regions is as follows:

Economy of Liverpool City Region compared to all combined authority areas in England
Combined authority area	Core city (if applicable)	GVA (2021) (£ billions)	GDP (2021) (£ billions)	GDP per head (2021) (£)
Cambridgeshire and Peterborough		28.648	31.698	35,348
Greater Manchester	Manchester	78.744	87.703	30,576
Liverpool City Region	Liverpool	35.345	40.479	26,086
North East		22.516	26.255	23,038
North of Tyne	Newcastle upon Tyne	19.725	22.444	27,075
South Yorkshire	Sheffield	28.971	33.528	24,399
Tees Valley		14.241	16.346	24,103
West Midlands	Birmingham	70.961	79.076	27,117
West of England	Bristol	34.110	37.571	39,371
West Yorkshire	Leeds	60.137	67.607	28,769

== Landmarks ==
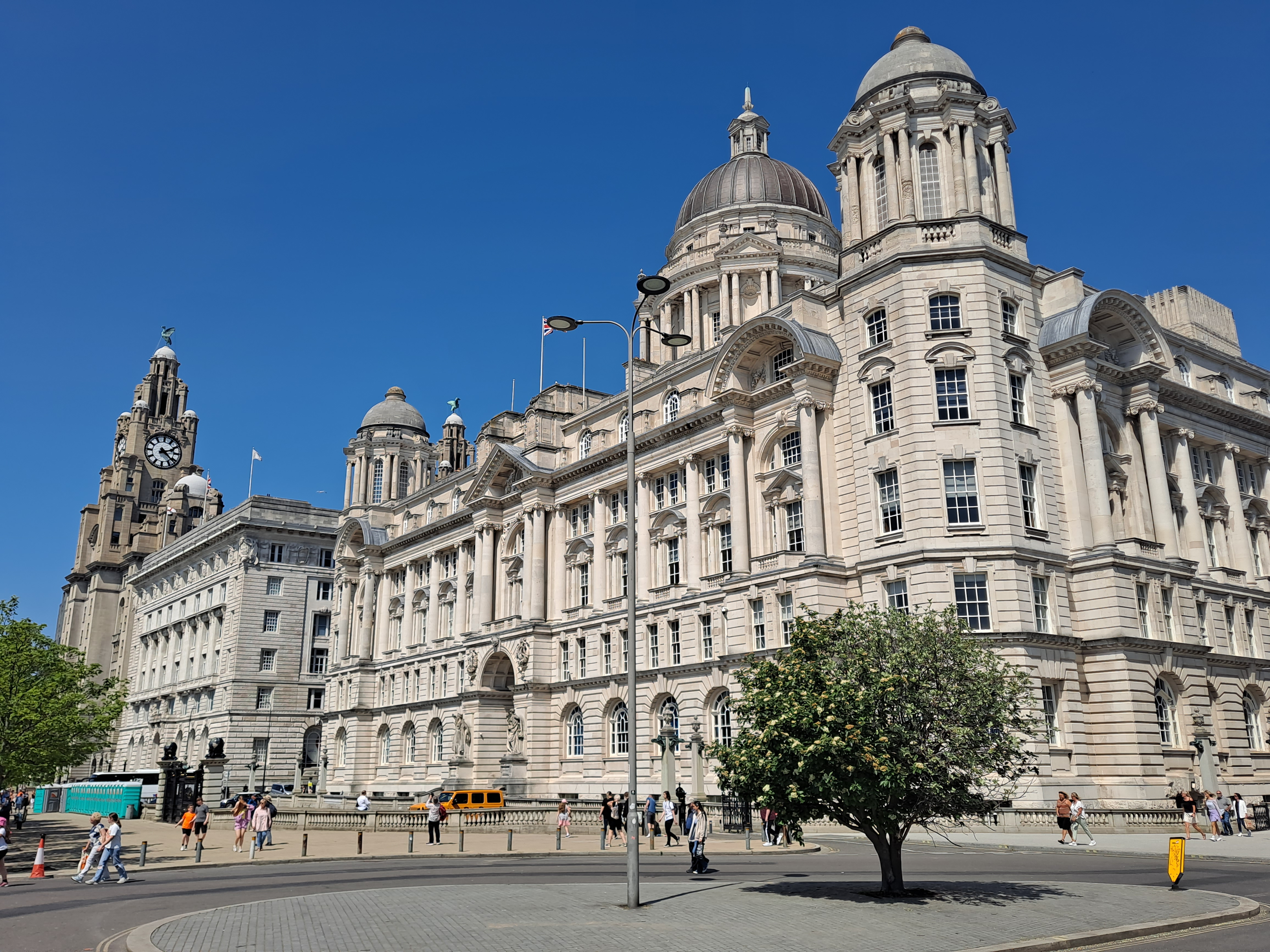
Liverpool's Three Graces, the Royal Liver Building, Cunard Building and Port of Liverpool Building at the Pier Head

Liverpool's long commercial history has given rise to a considerable variety of architectural styles found within the city, ranging from 16th-century Tudor buildings to modern-day contemporary architecture. The majority of buildings in the city date from the late 18th century onwards, the period during which the city grew into one of the foremost powers in the British Empire. There are over 2,500 listed buildings in Liverpool, of which 27 are Grade I listed and 85 are Grade II* listed. The city also has a greater number of public sculptures than any other location in the United Kingdom aside from Westminster and significant number of Georgian houses still exist. This richness of architecture has subsequently seen Liverpool described by English Heritage, as England's finest Victorian city.

The value of Liverpool's architecture and design was recognised in 2004, when several areas throughout the city were declared a UNESCO World Heritage Site. Known as the Liverpool Maritime Mercantile City, the sites were added in recognition of the city's role in the development of international trade and docking technology. However, this status was revoked in July 2021, when UNESCO resolved that recent and proposed developments, such as the Bramley-Moore Dock Stadium and Liverpool Waters projects, had resulted in the "serious deterioration" of the area's significance.

=== Waterfront and docks ===
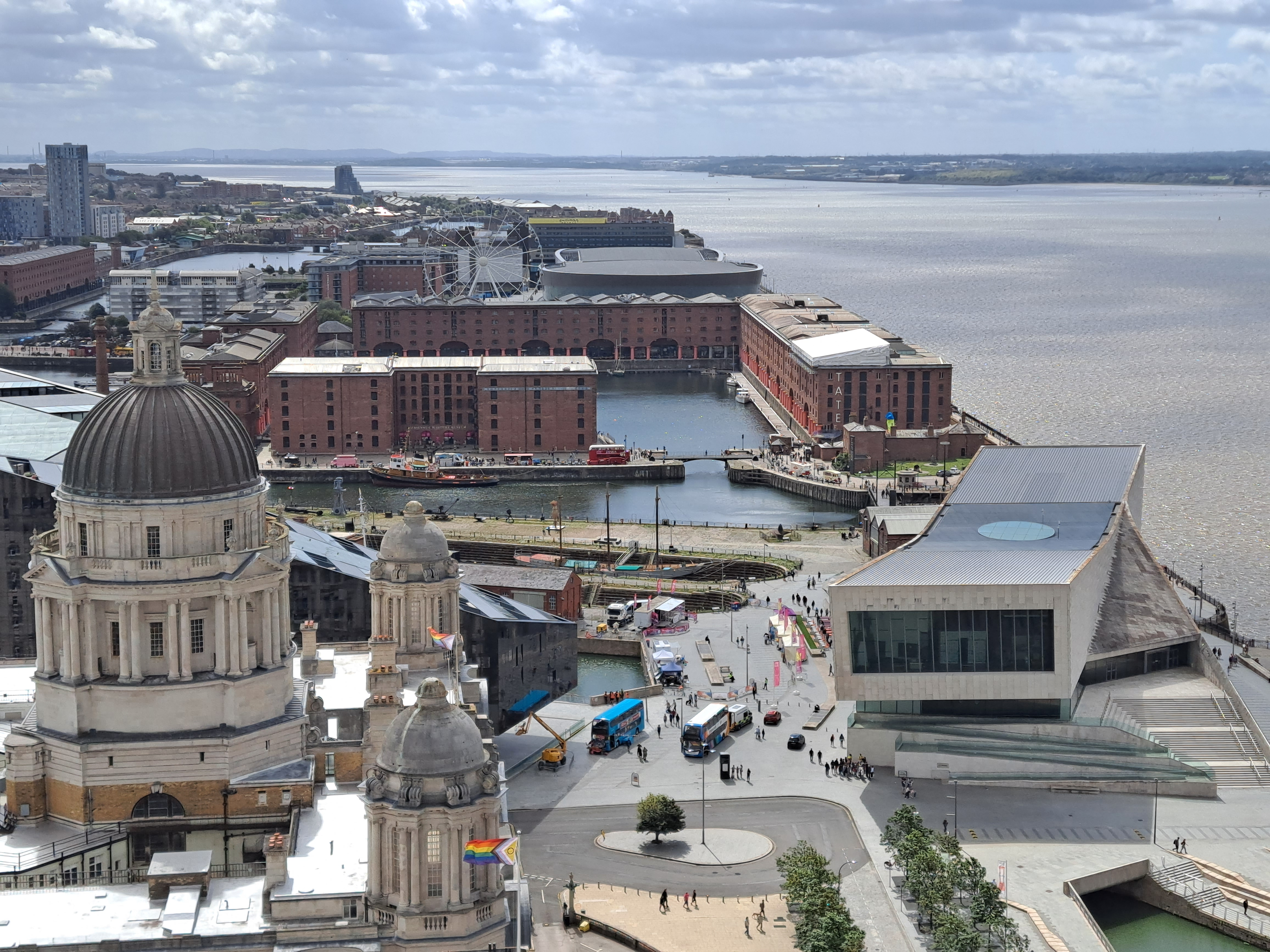
The Liverpool Waterfront with the Port of Liverpool Building, Museum of Liverpool, Royal Albert Dock and Wheel of Liverpool all visible

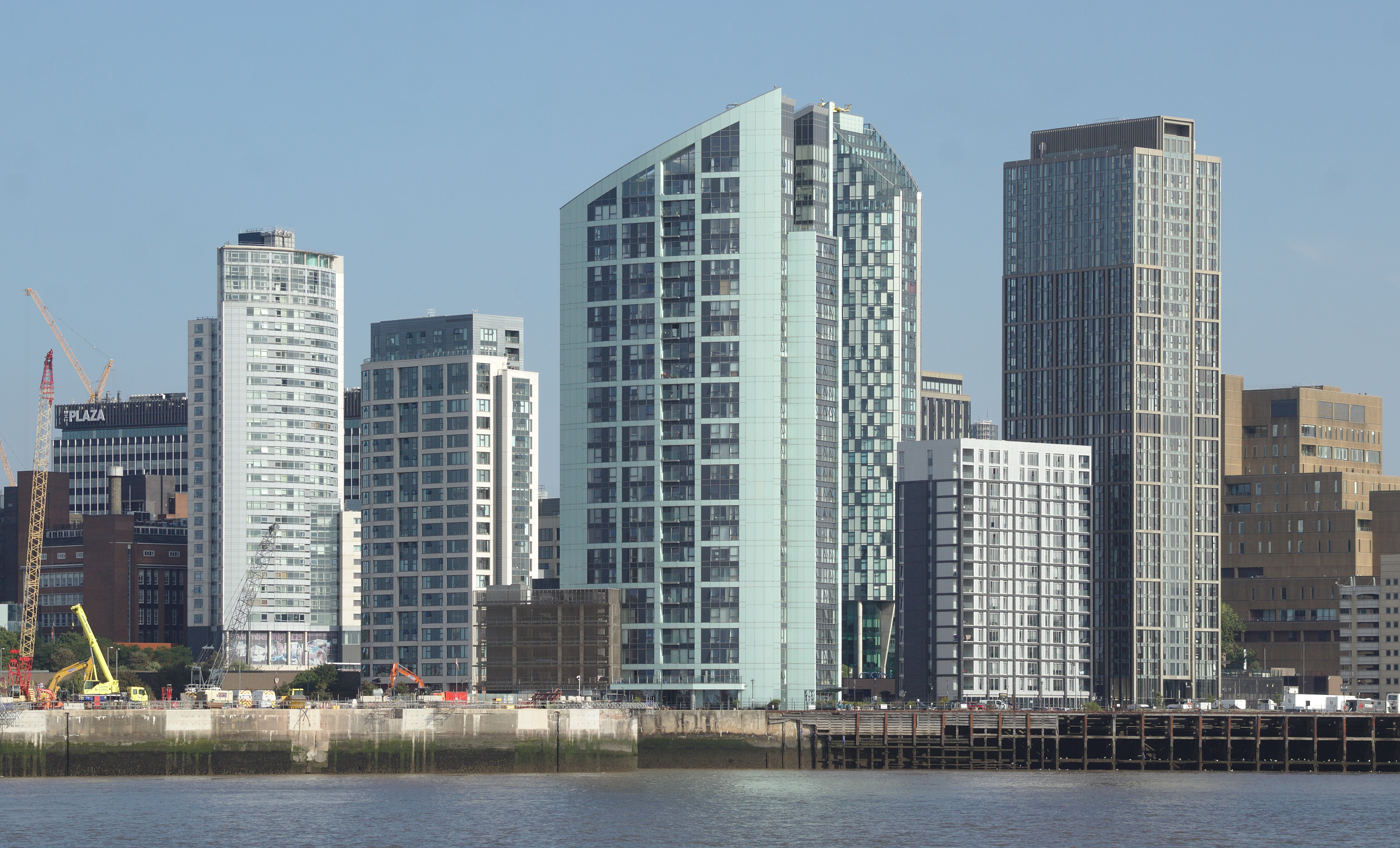
Modern office and commercial developments on the Liverpool Waterfront

As a major British port, the docks in Liverpool have historically been central to the city's development. Several major docking firsts have occurred in the city including the construction of the world's first enclosed wet dock (the Old Dock) in 1715 and the first ever hydraulic lifting cranes. The best-known dock in Liverpool is the Royal Albert Dock, which was constructed in 1846 and today comprises the largest single collection of Grade I listed buildings anywhere in Britain. Built under the guidance of Jesse Hartley, it was considered to be one of the most advanced docks anywhere in the world upon completion and is often attributed with helping the city to become one of the most important ports in the world. Today, the Royal Albert Dock houses restaurants, bars, shops, two hotels as well as the Merseyside Maritime Museum, International Slavery Museum, Tate Liverpool and The Beatles Story. North of the city centre is Stanley Dock, home to the Stanley Dock Tobacco Warehouse, which was at the time of its construction in 1901, the world's largest building in terms of area and today stands as the world's largest brick-work building.

One of the most famous locations in Liverpool is the Pier Head, renowned for the trio of buildings—the Royal Liver Building, the Cunard Building and the Port of Liverpool Building—which sit upon it. Collectively referred to as the Three Graces, these buildings stand as a testament to the great wealth in the city during the late 19th and early 20th centuries. Built in a variety of architectural styles, they are recognised as being the symbol of 'maritime Liverpool' and are regarded by many as contributing to one of the most impressive waterfronts in the world.

In the 21st century, several areas along Liverpool's waterfront have undergone significant redevelopment. Among the notable developments are the Museum of Liverpool, the construction of the Liverpool Arena, ACC Liverpool and Exhibition Centre Liverpool on King's Dock, Alexandra Tower and 1 Princes Dock on Prince's Dock and Liverpool Marina around Coburg and Brunswick Docks. The Wheel of Liverpool opened on 25 March 2010.

However, plans to redevelop parts of Liverpool city centre have been marred by controversy. In December 2016, a newly formed company called North Point Global Ltd. was given the rights to develop part of the docks under the "New Chinatown" working name. Though heavily advertised in Liverpool, Hong Kong and Chinese cities with high-profile advertisements and videos, the "New Chinatown" development failed to materialise. In January 2018, the Liverpool Echo and Asia Times revealed that the site remained sans any construction. North Point Global as well as its subcontractor "Bilt" had both declared bankruptcy, and the small investors (mostly middle class couples) who had already paid money for the apartments had lost most of their savings in them.

=== Commercial district and cultural quarter ===
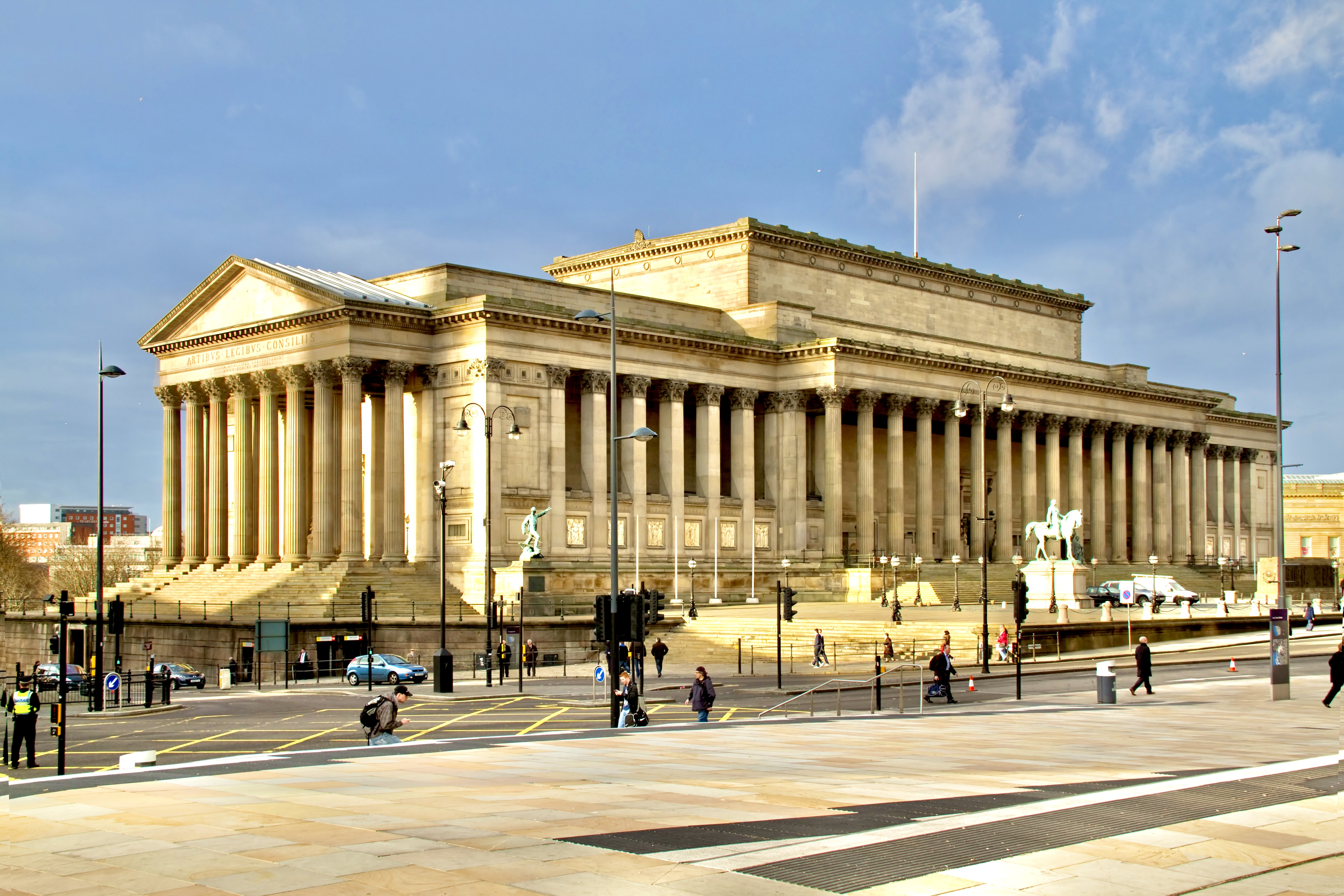
St George's Hall

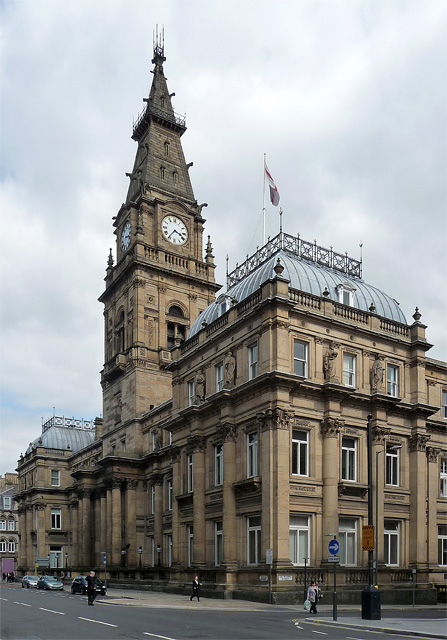
Municipal Buildings

Liverpool's historic position as one of the most important trading ports in the world has meant that over time many grand buildings have been constructed in the city as headquarters for shipping firms, insurance companies, banks and other large firms. The great wealth this brought then allowed for the development of grand civic buildings, which were designed to allow the local administrators to 'run the city with pride'.

The commercial district is centred on the Castle Street, Dale Street and Old Hall Street areas of the city, with many of the area's roads still following their medieval layout. Having developed predominantly over a period of three centuries, the area is regarded as one of the most important architectural locations in the city, as recognised by its inclusion in Liverpool's former World Heritage site.

The oldest building in the area is the Grade I listed Liverpool Town Hall, which is located at the top of Castle Street and dates from 1754. Often regarded as the city's finest piece of Georgian architecture, the building is known as one of the most extravagantly decorated civic buildings anywhere in Britain. Also on Castle Street is the Grade I listed Bank of England Building, constructed between 1845 and 1848, as one of only three provincial branches of the national bank. Among the other buildings in the area are the Tower Buildings, Albion House (the former White Star Line headquarters), the Municipal Buildings and Oriel Chambers, which is considered to be one of the earliest Modernist style buildings ever built.

The area around William Brown Street is referred to as the city's 'Cultural Quarter', owing to the presence of numerous civic buildings, including the William Brown Library, Walker Art Gallery, Picton Reading Rooms and World Museum Liverpool. The area is dominated by neo-classical architecture, of which the most prominent, St George's Hall, is widely regarded as the best example of a neo-classical building anywhere in Europe. A Grade I listed building, it was constructed between 1840 and 1855 to serve a variety of civic functions in the city and its doors are inscribed with "S.P.Q.L." (Latin senatus populusque Liverpudliensis), meaning "the senate and people of Liverpool". William Brown Street is also home to numerous public monuments and sculptures, including Wellington's Column and the Steble Fountain. Many others are located around the area, particularly in St John's Gardens, which was specifically developed for this purpose. The William Brown Street area has been likened to a modern recreation of the Roman Forum.

=== Other notable landmarks ===
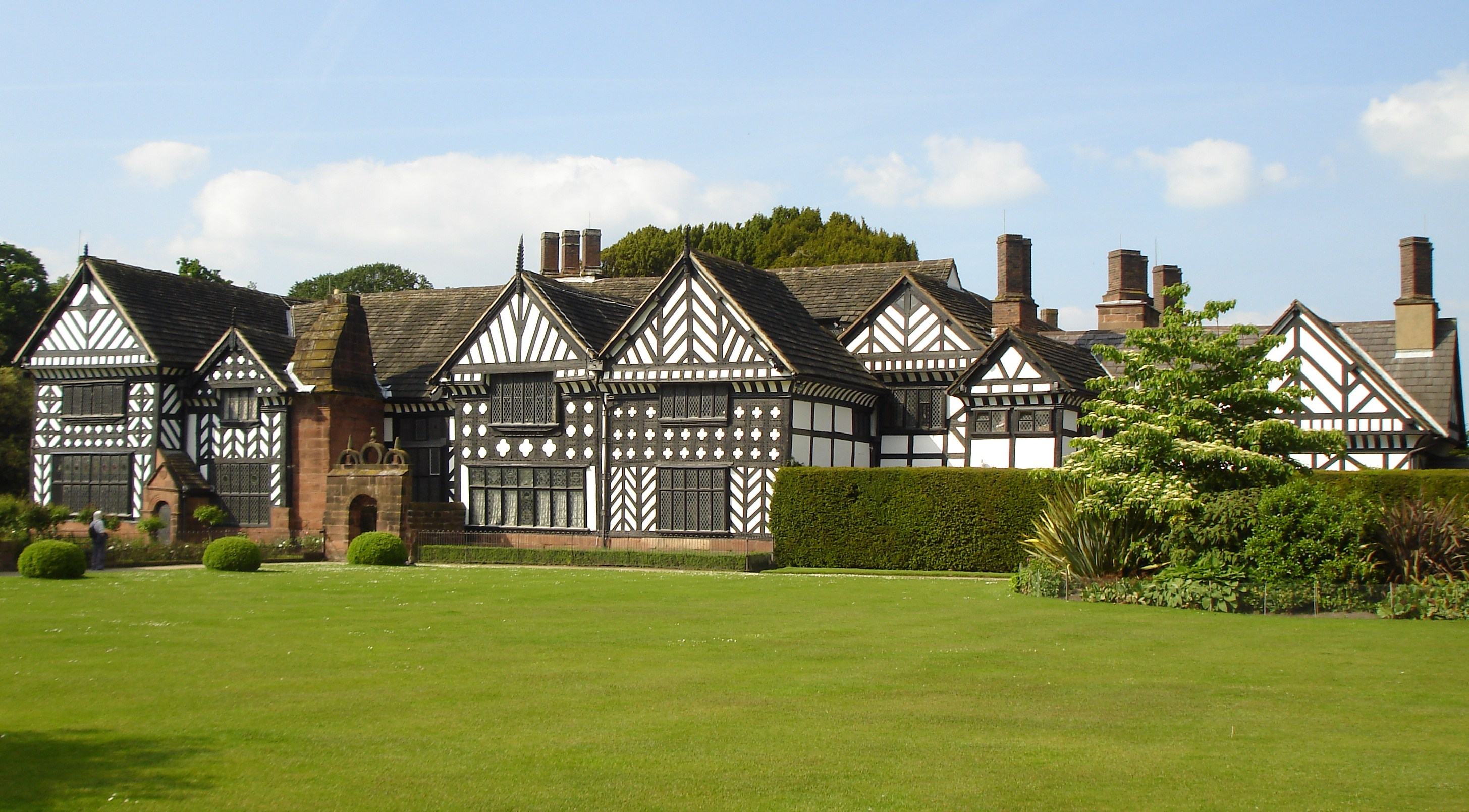
Speke Hall Tudor manor house is one of Liverpool's oldest buildings.

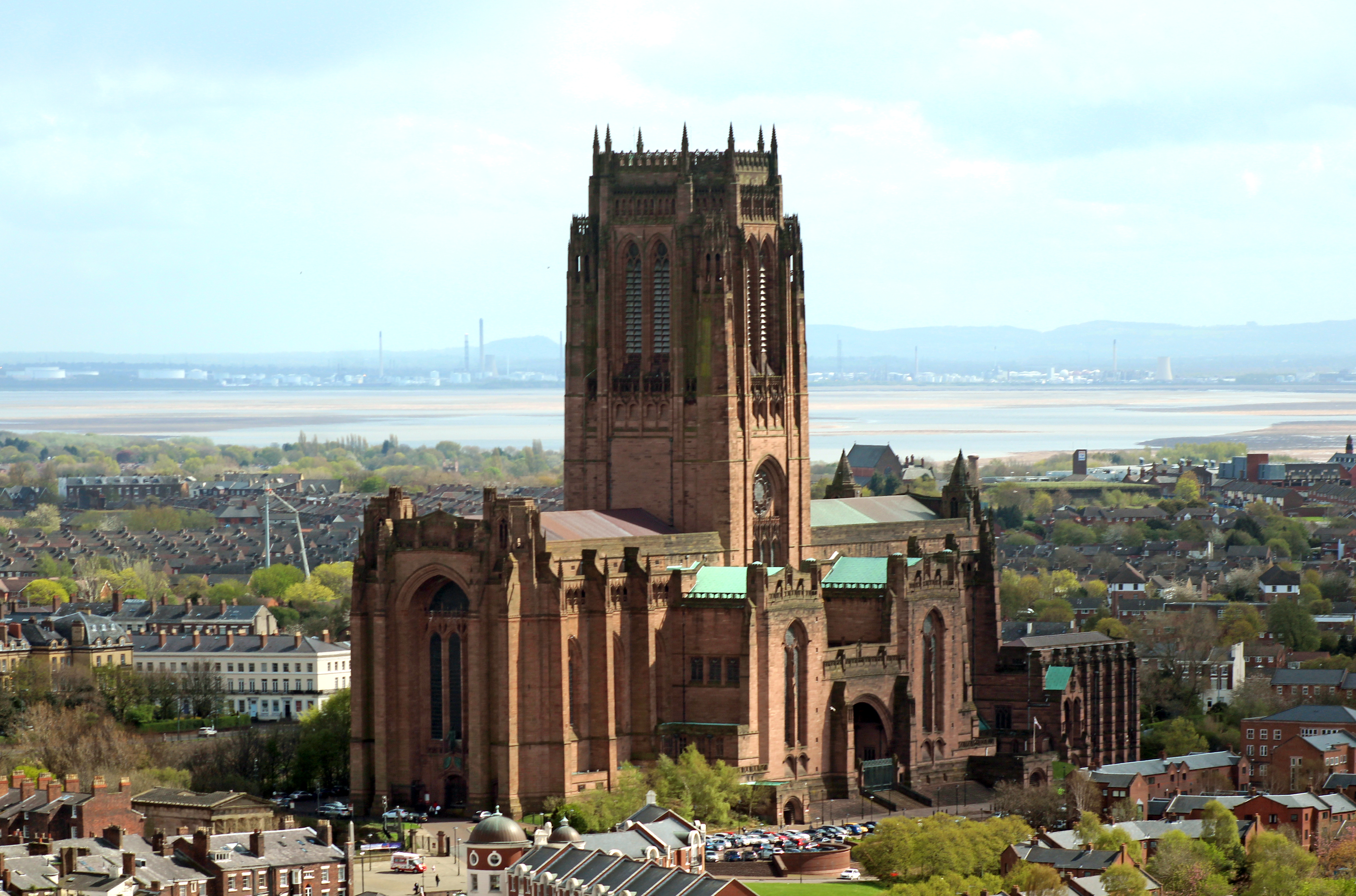
Liverpool Cathedral, the largest cathedral in the UK

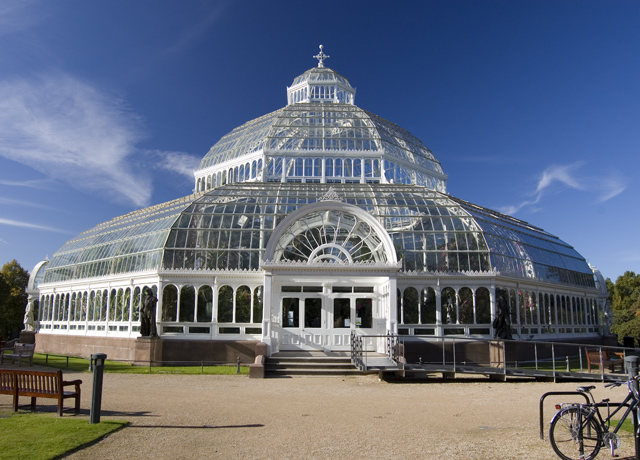
Sefton Park Palm House

While the majority of Liverpool's architecture dates from the mid-18th century onwards, there are several buildings that pre-date this time. One of the oldest surviving buildings is Speke Hall, a Tudor manor house located in the south of the city, which was completed in 1598. The building is one of the few remaining timber framed Tudor houses left in the north of England and is particularly noted for its Victorian interiors, which were added in the mid-19th century. In addition to Speke Hall, many of the city's other oldest surviving buildings are also former manor houses including Croxteth Hall and Woolton Hall, which were completed in 1702 and 1704 respectively.

The oldest building within the city centre is the Grade I listed Bluecoat Chambers, which was built between 1717 and 1718. Constructed in British Queen Anne style architecture, the building was influenced in part by the work of Christopher Wren and was originally the home of the Bluecoat School (who later moved to a larger site in Wavertree in the south of the city). Since 1908, it has acted as a centre for arts in Liverpool.

Liverpool is noted for having two cathedrals, each of which imposes over the landscape around it. The Anglican Cathedral, which was constructed between 1904 and 1978, is the largest cathedral in Britain and the fifth largest in the world. Designed and built in Gothic style, it is regarded as one of the greatest buildings to have been constructed during the 20th century and was described by former British Poet Laureate, John Betjeman, as "one of the great buildings of the world". The Roman Catholic Metropolitan Cathedral was constructed between 1962 and 1967 and is known as one of the first cathedrals to break the traditional longitudinal design.

In the 21st century, many parts of Liverpool's city centre have undergone significant redevelopment and regeneration after years of decline. So far, the largest of these developments has been Liverpool One, which saw almost £1 billion invested in the redevelopment of 42 acres (17 hectares) of land, providing new retail, commercial, residential and leisure space. Around the north of the city centre, several new skyscrapers have also been constructed including the RIBA award-winning Unity Buildings and West Tower, which at 140m is Liverpool's tallest building. Many redevelopment schemes are also in progress including Circus, King's Dock, Paddington Village and Liverpool Waters.

There are many other notable buildings in Liverpool, including the art deco former terminal building of Speke Airport, the University of Liverpool's Victoria Building, (which provided the inspiration for the term Red Brick University), and the Adelphi Hotel, which was in the past considered to be one of the finest hotels anywhere in the world.

=== Parks and gardens ===
The Register of Historic Parks and Gardens of Special Historic Interest in England describes Merseyside's Victorian Parks as collectively the "most important in the country". Liverpool has ten listed parks and cemeteries, including two Grade I and five Grade II*, more than any other English city apart from London.

== Transport ==
Liverpool has an extensive transport infrastructure that connects the city with its metropolitan area, the rest of the United Kingdom, Europe and the world. Various modes of transport provide considerable connections by road, rail, air and sea. The local network of buses, trains and ferries is managed by Merseytravel, on behalf of the Liverpool City Region Combined Authority and the Metro Mayor of the Liverpool City Region. The Mayor and Combined Authority have control of a devolved transport budget and associated transport powers for this local system. The city's major port and international airport provide global links for both passengers and freight.

=== National and international travel ===
==== Roads ====
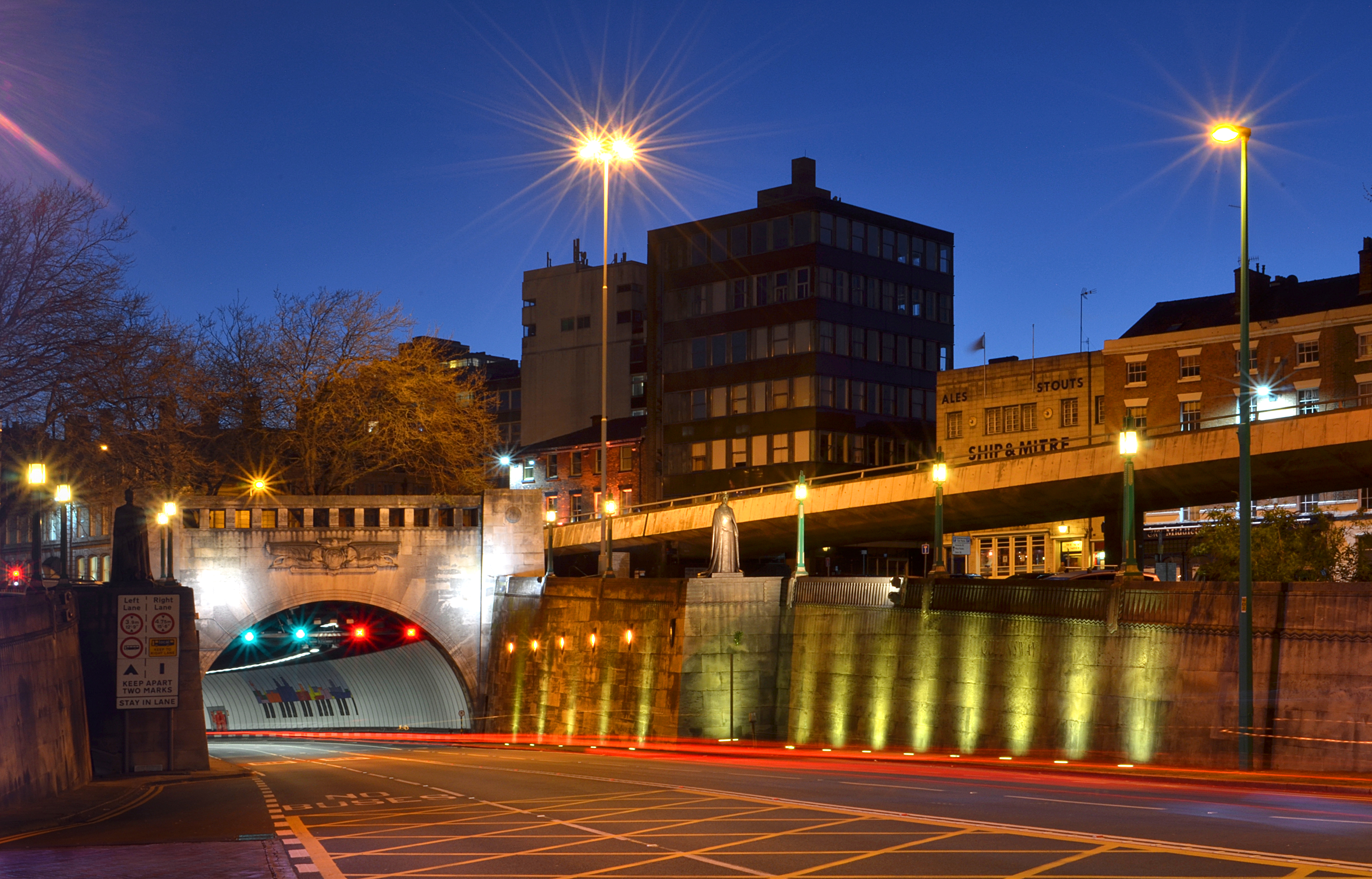
The Liverpool city centre entrance to the Queensway tunnel under the River Mersey

The city sits at the centre of a much larger metropolitan area. Its suburbs run contiguously into the neighbouring boroughs defined by the ONS as the Liverpool Built-up Area. The wider City Region and Merseyside in general is densely urbanised and divided by several motorways and major roads. The city is served by a network motorways. The three motorways in closest proximity are the M58 to the north, and M62 and M57 to the east.

To the north, the M58 motorway runs 12 miles and provides links to the neighbouring counties of Lancashire and Greater Manchester, finally joining with the M6 west of Wigan.

To the east, the M62 runs across the north of England, ultimately connecting Liverpool with Hull on the opposite coast, and along the route with several large cities including Manchester, Leeds and Bradford. The M62 also provides a connection to both the M6 and M1 motorways, providing indirect links to more distant areas including Birmingham, London, Nottingham, Preston and Sheffield.

To the east, but running north–south, the M57 acts as a 10-mile ring road for the city itself and links the M62 and M58 motorways, as well as the A580 East Lancashire Road providing a link directly to the A5300 that links to the bridges that cross the Mersey to the south of the city.

To the south, Liverpool is connected to Widnes and Warrington via the A562 and A5300 and across the River Mersey to Runcorn in Cheshire, via the Silver Jubilee and Mersey Gateway bridges. The M56 motorway then provides routes into parts of the neighbouring counties, with connections to the Wirral and North Wales, and a direct route to Manchester Airport.

The Kingsway and Queensway Tunnels connect Liverpool with the settlements on the Wirral Peninsula across the Mersey to the west, including Birkenhead and Wallasey. The A41 road and M53 motorway, which both begin in Birkenhead, link to Cheshire and Shropshire and via the A55, to North Wales.

==== Railway ====
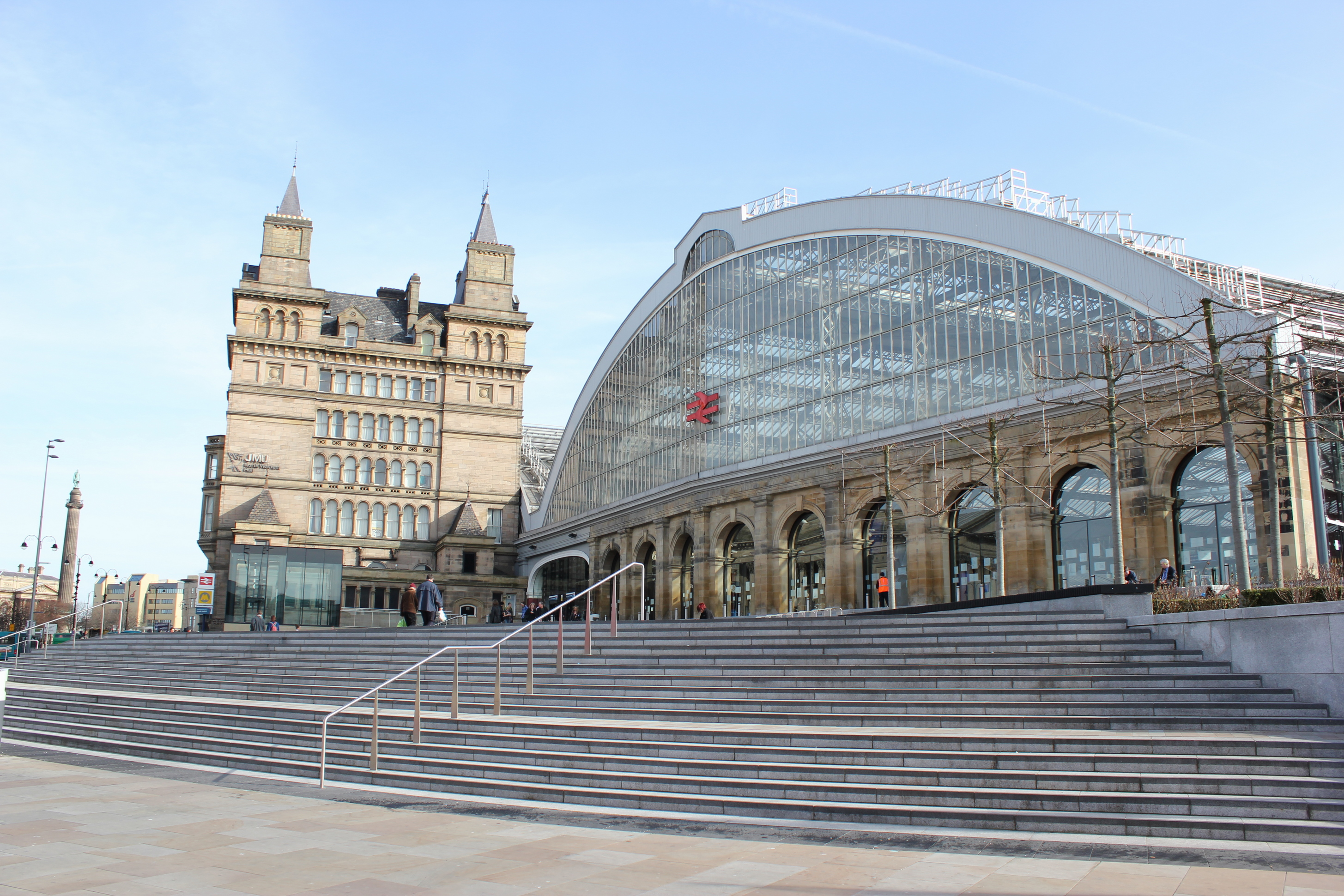
Liverpool Lime Street, one of the busiest railway stations in the UK outside London

The national network, which is managed by Network Rail, provides Liverpool with connections to major towns and cities across England. The city's primary main line station is Liverpool Lime Street, which is the terminus for several lines into the city.

The station is served by six train operating companies: Avanti West Coast, East Midlands Railway, Northern Trains, Transport for Wales, TransPennine Express and West Midlands Trains. Between them, the station is connected with direct services to numerous destinations including London Euston (in 2 hours 8 minutes with Pendolino trains), Birmingham New Street, Cleethorpes, Glasgow Central, Leeds, Manchester Piccadilly, Newcastle, Norwich, Nottingham, Preston, Sheffield and York.

Opened in 1836, Lime Street is the world's oldest main line terminus station still in use. In the south of the city, Liverpool South Parkway provides a connection to the city's airport.

==== Port ====
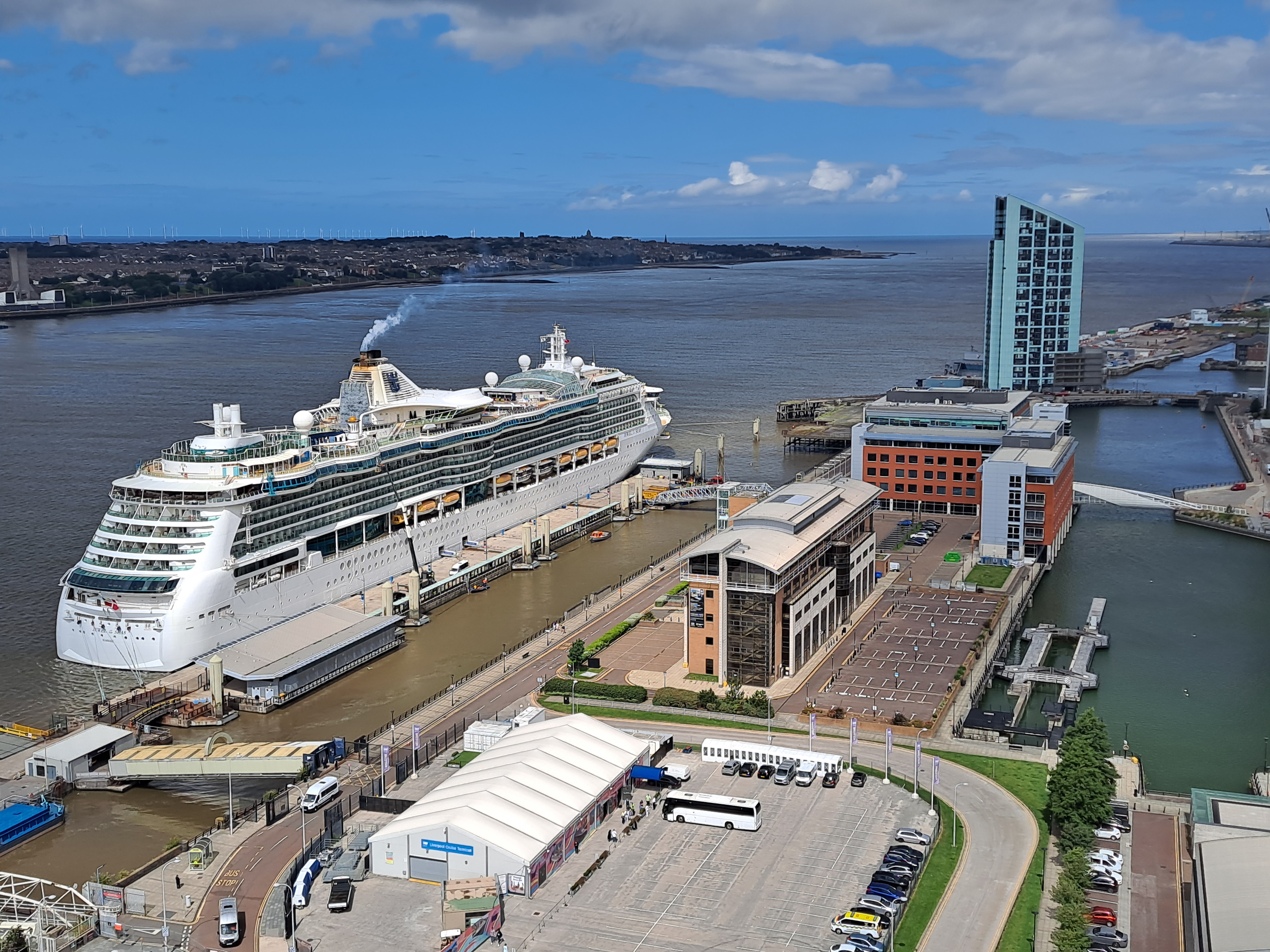
Liverpool Cruise Terminal

The Port of Liverpool connects passengers and freight to Liverpool from all around the world. Passenger ferry services depart from the city across the Irish Sea to Belfast and the Isle of Man. Services are provided by several companies, including the Isle of Man Steam Packet Company, P&O Ferries and Stena Line.

The Liverpool Cruise Terminal handles over 200,000 passengers and crew annually and is located alongside the Pier Head in the city centre. Berthing facilities for long-distance passenger cruises are provided and served by a large number of different cruise lines. Ports in Australia, France, Faroe Islands, Iceland, North America, Norway, Spain and the Caribbean are served by the facility. The cruise lines that call at Liverpool cruise terminal include the following:

- Ambassador
- Atlas Ocean Voyages
- Azamara
- Carnival Cruise Line
- Celebrity Cruises
- Cunard Line
- Disney Cruise Line
- Fred Olsen
- Hapag-Lloyd cruises
- Holland America Line
- Noble Caledonia
- Norwegian
- P&O Cruises
- Princess Cruises
- Regent Seven Seas
- Royal Caribbean
- Saga Cruises
- Silversea Cruises
- Viking

As of 2022, the Port of Liverpool is the fourth busiest port in the UK by freight tonnage, handling 33 million tonnes of freight cargo. It is the main port in the country for transatlantic trade and the largest port on the west coast of the UK. The Royal Seaforth and Liverpool2 container terminals are the port's two main terminals and handle a wide variety of cargo including containers, liquid and dry bulk cargoes such as coal and grain, biomass and roll-on/roll-off cargoes such as cars and trucks. Leeds and Liverpool Canal runs into Liverpool city centre via Liverpool Canal Link at Pier Head since 2009.

==== Airport ====
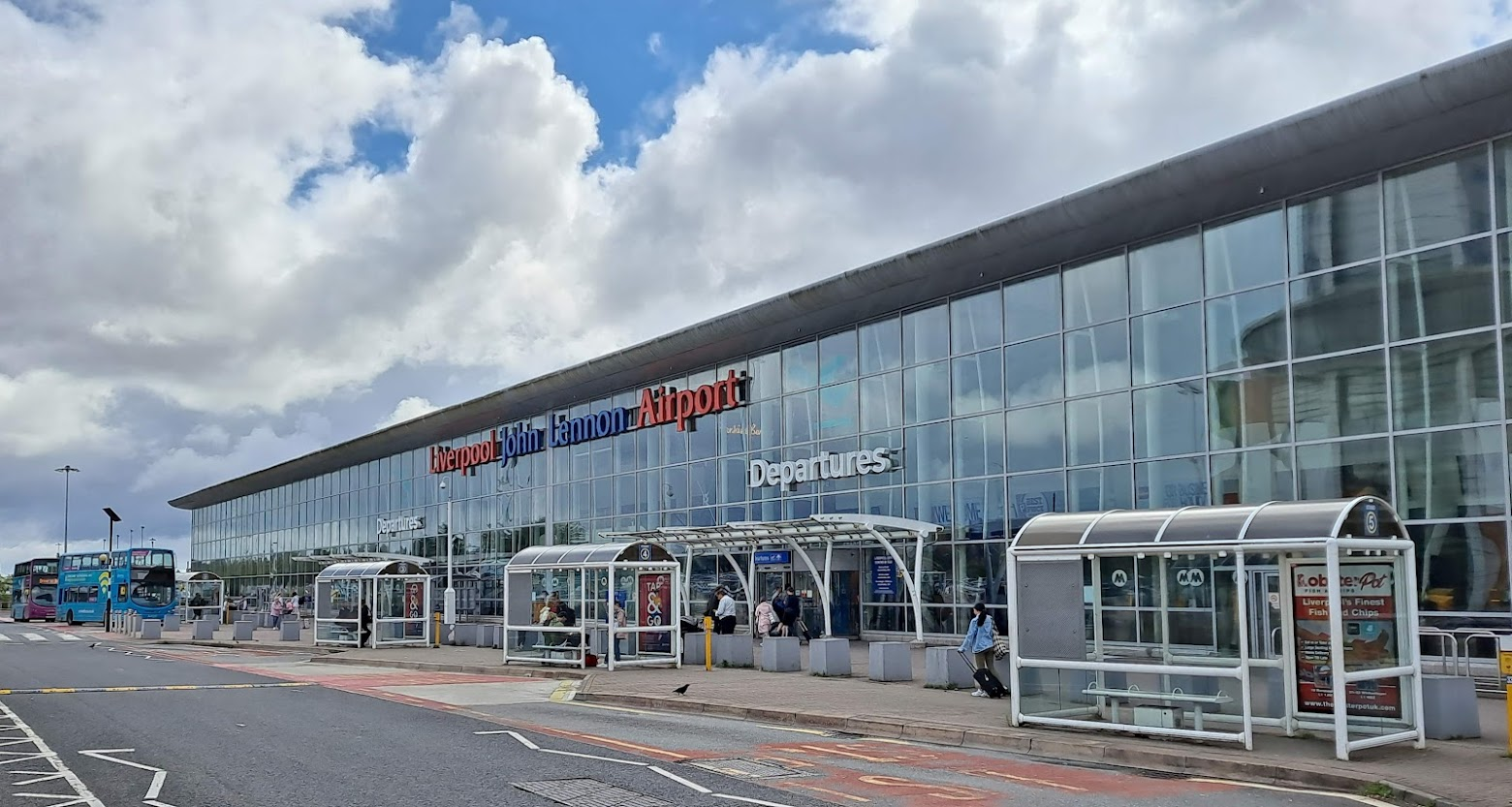
Liverpool John Lennon Airport terminal building

Liverpool John Lennon Airport, which is located in the south of the city, provides direct air connections across the United Kingdom and Europe. It offers direct services to over 60 airports worldwide and to over 100 destinations via one-stop connections in Frankfurt, Dublin and Keflavík. The airport is primarily served by low-cost airlines namely Aer Lingus, easyJet, Jet2.com, Loganair, Lufthansa, Ryanair, Widerøe and Wizz Air, although it does provide facilities for private aircraft.

=== Local travel ===
==== Railway ====
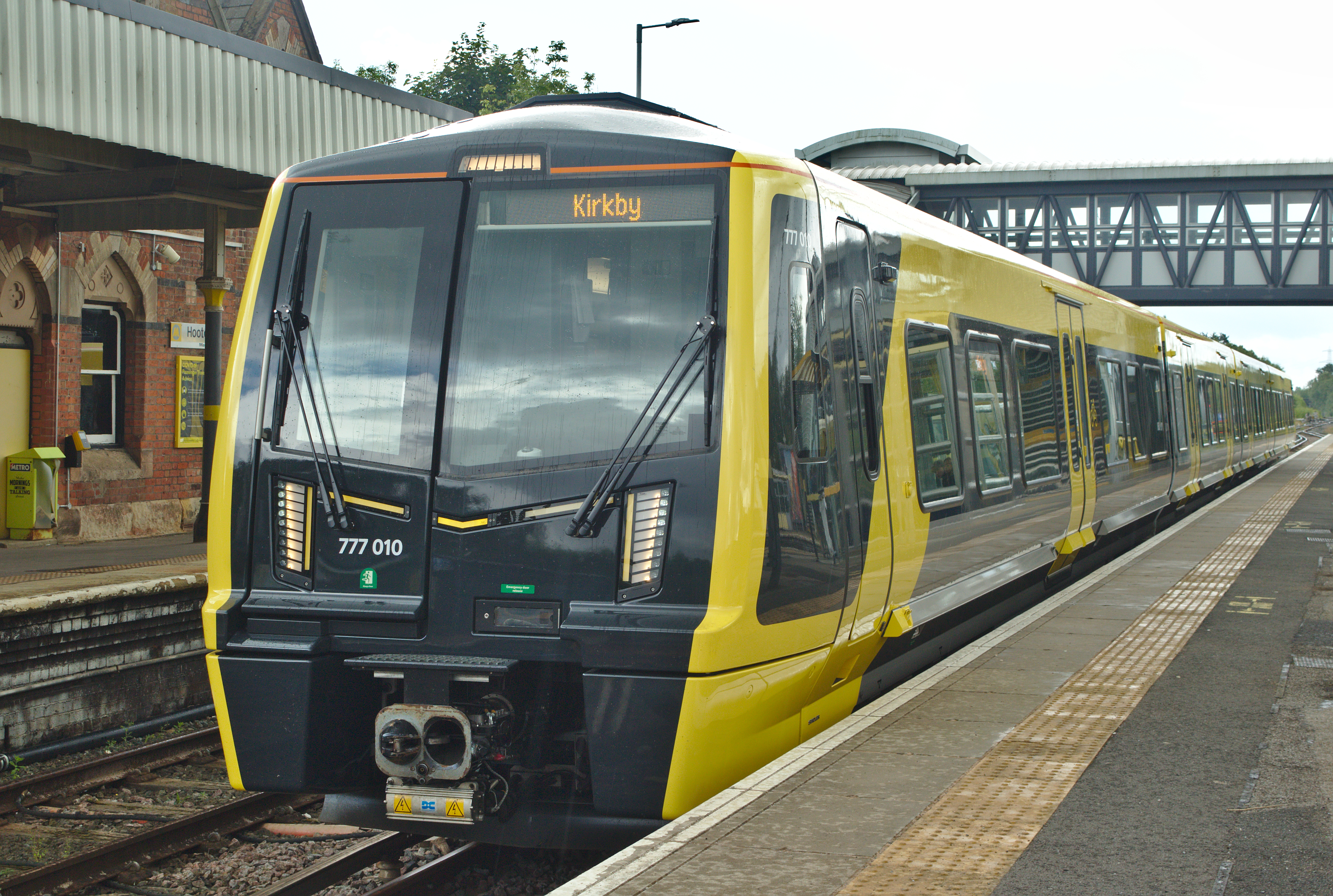
A Class 777 train operated by Merseyrail

Liverpool's urban railway network, known as Merseyrail, is one of the busiest and most extensive in the country. The network provides approximately 30 million passenger journeys per year, across a system of 69 stations throughout Liverpool's metropolitan area, within the formal boundaries of the Liverpool city region and adjacent areas of Cheshire and Lancashire.

The network consists of three lines:

- the Northern Line, which runs to Southport, Ormskirk, Headbolt Lane and Hunts Cross
- the Wirral Line, which runs through the Mersey Railway Tunnel and has branches to New Brighton, West Kirby, Chester and Ellesmere Port
- the City Line, which begins at Lime Street, providing links to St Helens Junction, Wigan North Western, Preston, Warrington Central and Manchester Victoria.

The network is predominantly electric and covers 75 miles (120 kilometres) of track. Trains are owned and operated by the Merseyrail franchise and managed by Merseytravel under the direction of the Liverpool City Region Combined Authority. Local services on the City Line are operated by Northern Trains, although the line itself remains part of the Merseyrail network. Within Liverpool city centre, four stations and over 6 1/2 miles (10.5 kilometres) of tunnels are underground. Birkenhead Hamilton Square and Liverpool James Street are the oldest deep level underground stations in the world.

In 2023, for the first time in UK history, battery-powered passenger trains launched on Merseyrail tracks from the newly opened Headbolt Lane station in Kirkby. The Liverpool City Region Combined Authority's long term Merseyrail for All plan is to reduce dependency on live third rail and promote battery power in order to further expand Merseyrail to previously inaccessible places across the city region and as far as Manchester, Wrexham, Warrington and Preston.

==== Buses ====
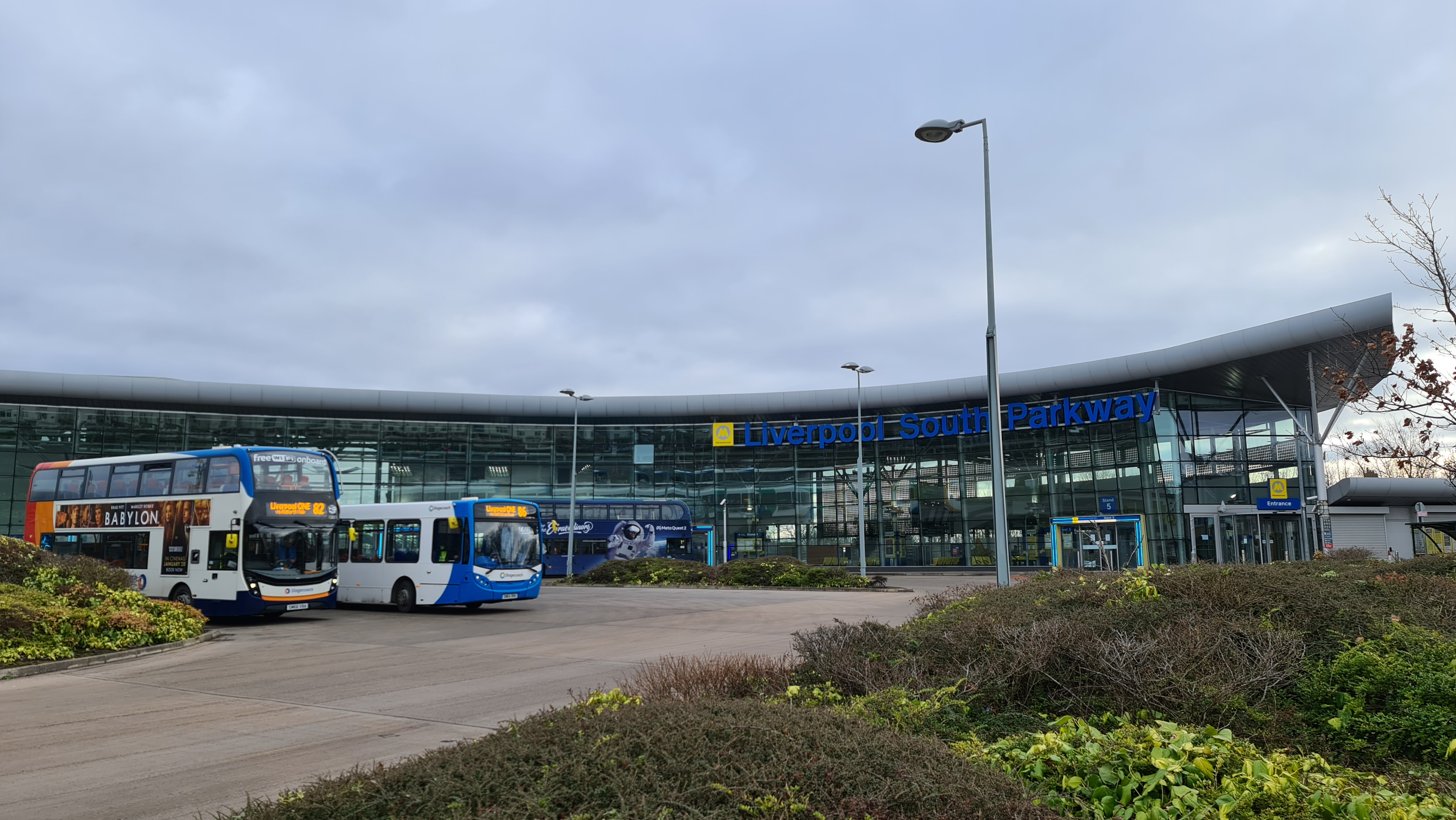
Liverpool South Parkway, a bus & rail interchange serving south Liverpool and Liverpool John Lennon Airport

Local bus services within and around Liverpool are managed by Merseytravel and are run by several different companies, including Arriva and Stagecoach Merseyside and South Lancashire. The two principal termini for local buses are Queen Square bus station (located near Lime Street station) for services north and east of the city, and Liverpool One bus station (located near the Royal Albert Dock) for services to the south and east. Cross-river services to the Wirral use roadside terminus points in Castle Street and Sir Thomas Street. A night bus service also operates on Saturdays providing services from the city centre across Liverpool and wider region.

Tour bus services are provided by Maghull Coaches which allow tourists to hop-on-hop-off and view historical landmarks and attractions, as well as Liverpool F.C. and Beatles related locations. National Express services operate from the Liverpool One bus station to and from destinations across the UK. In 2023, the Liverpool city region confirmed plans to become the second place outside London to implement bus franchising. Local leaders have argued that it will improve services by transferring control over fares, ticketing and routes from bus companies to the Combined Authority. The full implementation of bus franchising will take place by the end of 2028.

==== Mersey Ferry ====
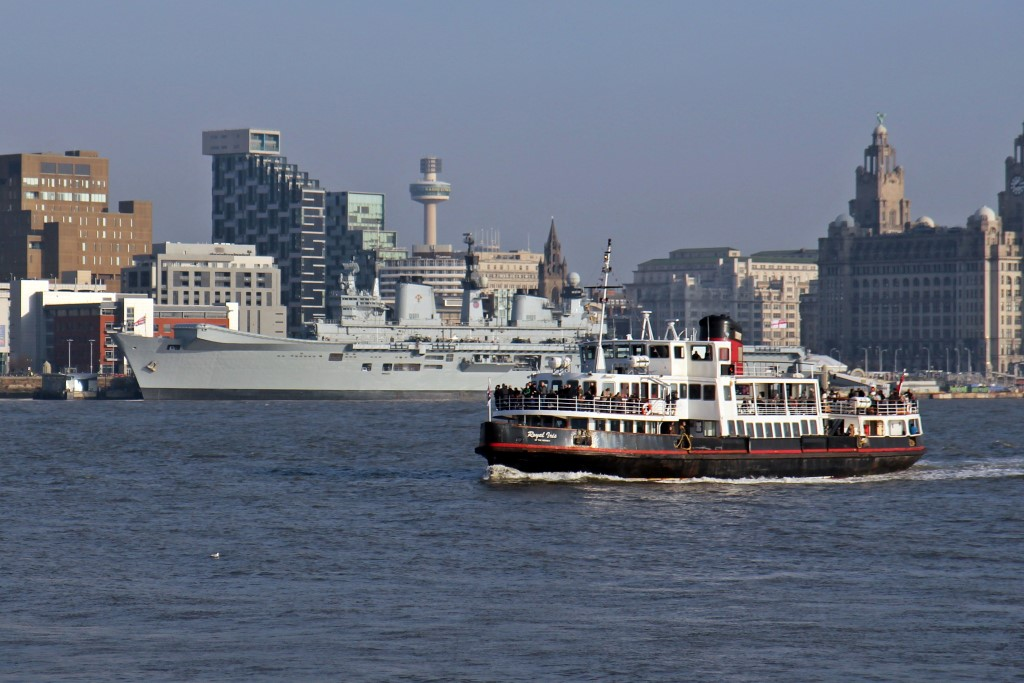
A Mersey Ferry (foreground) with the Liverpool waterfront in the distance

The cross-river ferry service in Liverpool, known as the Mersey Ferry, is managed and operated by Merseytravel, with services operating between the Pier Head in Liverpool city centre and both Woodside in Birkenhead and Seacombe in Wallasey. Services operate at intervals ranging from 20 minutes, at peak times, to every hour during the middle of the day and at weekends. Despite remaining an important transport link between the city and the Wirral Peninsula, the Mersey Ferry has become an increasingly popular tourist attraction within the city, with daytime River Explorer Cruises providing passengers with an historical overview of the River Mersey and surrounding areas.

=== Cycling and scooters ===
A scooter-sharing system and electric bicycle scheme operates throughout Liverpool which allows residents and visitors to move around the city on rented scooters and bicycles. The scheme is operated by Swedish technology company Voi; riders are able to pick up and drop off bikes and scooters at various locations around the city. National Cycle Route 56, National Cycle Route 62 and National Cycle Route 810 run through Liverpool.

== Culture ==
As with other large cities, Liverpool is an important cultural centre within the United Kingdom, incorporating music, performing arts, museums and art galleries, literature and nightlife among others. In 2008, the cultural heritage of the city was celebrated with the city holding the title of European Capital of Culture, during which time a wide range of cultural celebrations took place in the city, including Go Superlambananas! and La Princesse. Liverpool has also held Europe's largest music and poetry event, the Welsh national Eisteddfod, three times, despite being in England, in 1884, 1900, and 1929.

=== Music ===
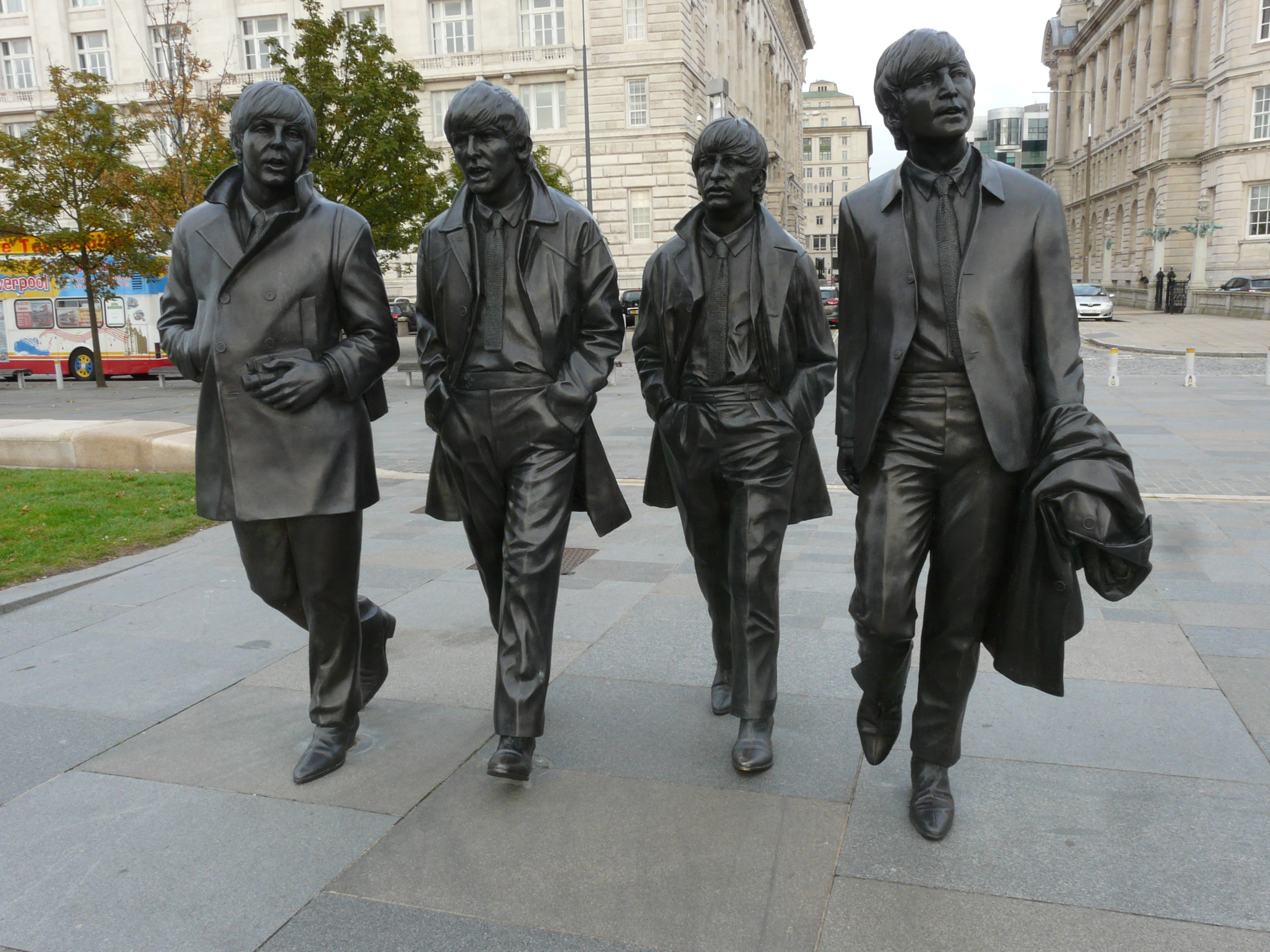
The Beatles statue at Pier Head. The group are the most commercially successful and critically acclaimed band in popular music.

Liverpool is internationally known for music and is recognised by Guinness World Records as the "World Capital City of Pop". Musicians from the city have produced 58 No. 1 singles, more than any other city in the world. Both the most successful male band and girl group in global music history have contained Liverpudlian members. Liverpool is most famous as the birthplace of the Beatles and during the 1960s was at the forefront of the Beat Music movement, which would eventually lead to the British Invasion. Many notable musicians of the time originated in the city including Billy J. Kramer, Cilla Black, Gerry and the Pacemakers and the Searchers. The influence of musicians from Liverpool, coupled with other cultural exploits of the time, such as the Liverpool poets, prompted American poet Allen Ginsberg to proclaim that the city was "the centre of consciousness of the human universe". Other musicians from Liverpool include Billy Fury, A Flock of Seagulls, Echo & the Bunnymen, Frankie Goes to Hollywood, Frankie Vaughan, Anathema, Ladytron, the Zutons, Cast, Atomic Kitten and Rebecca Ferguson. The La's 1990 hit single "There She Goes" was described by Rolling Stone as a "founding piece of Britpop's foundation."

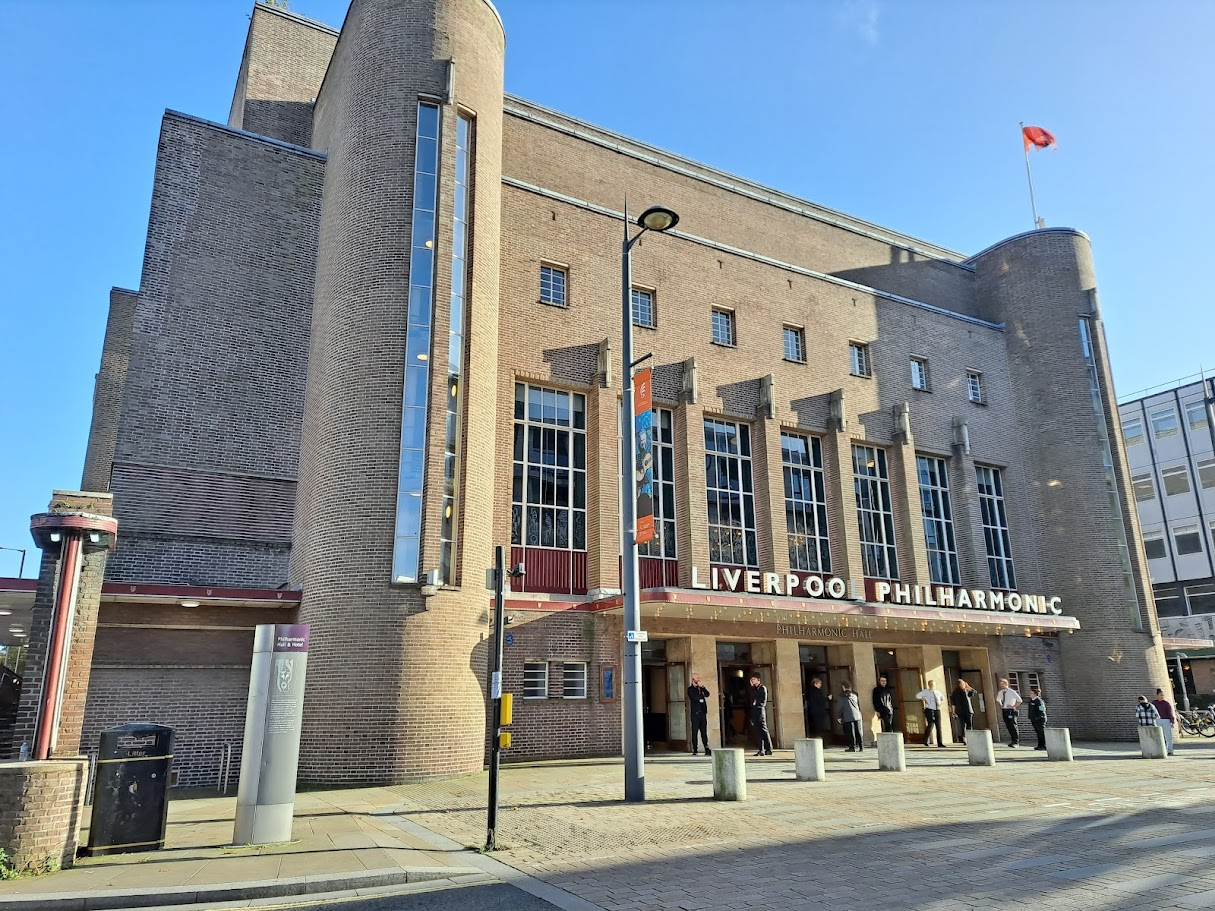
Philharmonic Hall, home of the Royal Liverpool Philharmonic

The city is also home to the oldest surviving professional symphony orchestra in the UK, the Royal Liverpool Philharmonic Orchestra, which is based in the Philharmonic Hall. The chief conductor of the orchestra is Vasily Petrenko. Sir Edward Elgar dedicated his Pomp and Circumstance March No. 1 to the Liverpool Orchestral Society, and the piece had its first performance in the city in 1901. Among Liverpool's curiosities, the Austrian émigré Fritz Spiegl is notable. He not only became a world expert on the etymology of Scouse, but composed the music to Z-cars and the Radio 4 UK Theme.

Well established festivals in the city include Africa Oyé and Brazilica which are the UK's largest free African and Brazilian music festivals respectively. The dance music festival Creamfields was established by the Liverpool-based Cream clubbing brand which started life as a weekly event at Nation nightclub. There are numerous music venues located across the city, however, the Liverpool Arena is by far the largest. Opened in 2008, the 11,000-seat arena hosted the MTV Europe Music Awards the same year, and since then has played host to world-renowned acts such as Andrea Bocelli, Beyoncé, Elton John, Kanye West, Kasabian, the Killers, Lady Gaga, Oasis, Pink, Rihanna, and UB40.

On 7 October 2022, the BBC and the European Broadcasting Union (EBU) announced that Liverpool would host the Eurovision Song Contest 2023 on behalf of the previous year's winning country Ukraine, which was unable to meet the demands of hosting the event due to security concerns caused by the Russo-Ukrainian war. The contest was held at Liverpool Arena, and consisted of two semi-finals on 9 and 11 May and a final on 13 May 2023. This was the first time that the contest took place in the city, and was also a record-extending ninth time that the UK has hosted the contest, having last done so in Birmingham in 1998.

=== Visual arts ===
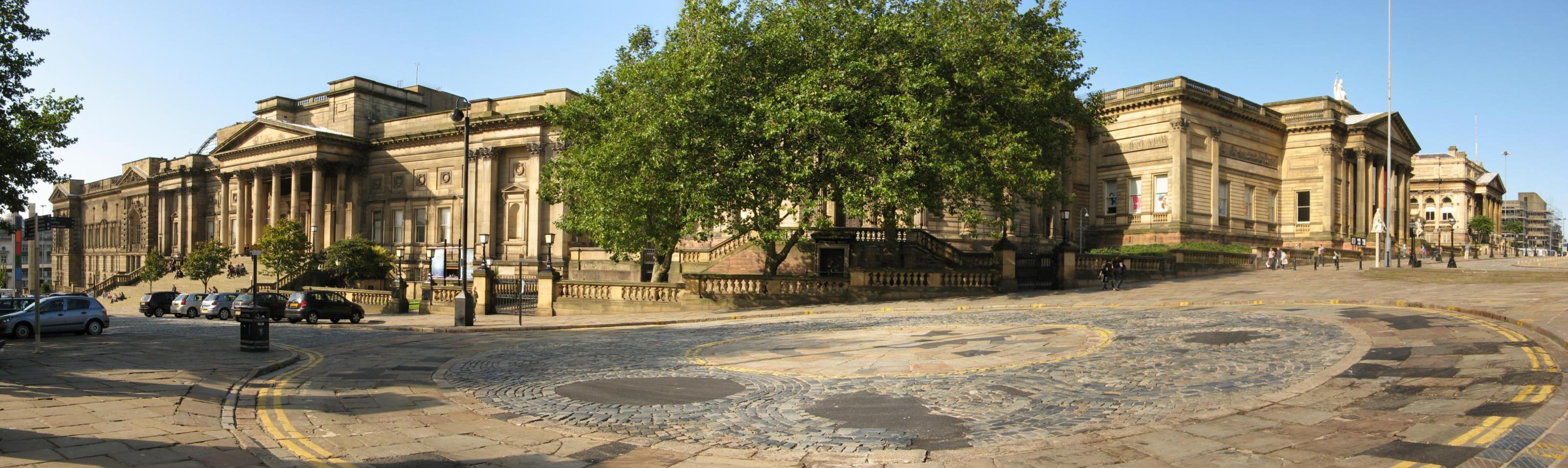
William Brown Street, also known as the Cultural Quarter, was a World Heritage Site consisting of the World Museum, Central Library, Picton Reading Room and Walker Art Gallery.

Liverpool has more galleries and national museums than any other city in the United Kingdom apart from London. National Museums Liverpool is the only English national collection based wholly outside London. The Tate Liverpool gallery houses the modern art collection of the Tate in the North of England and was, until the opening of Tate Modern, the largest exhibition space dedicated to modern art in the United Kingdom. The FACT centre hosts touring multimedia exhibitions, while the Walker Art Gallery houses one of the most impressive permanent collections of Pre-Raphaelite art in the world. Sudley House contains another major collection of pre-20th-century art. Liverpool University's Victoria Building was re-opened as a public art gallery and museum to display the university's artwork and historical collections which include the largest display of art by Audubon outside the US. A number of artists have also come from the city, including painter George Stubbs who was born in Liverpool in 1724.

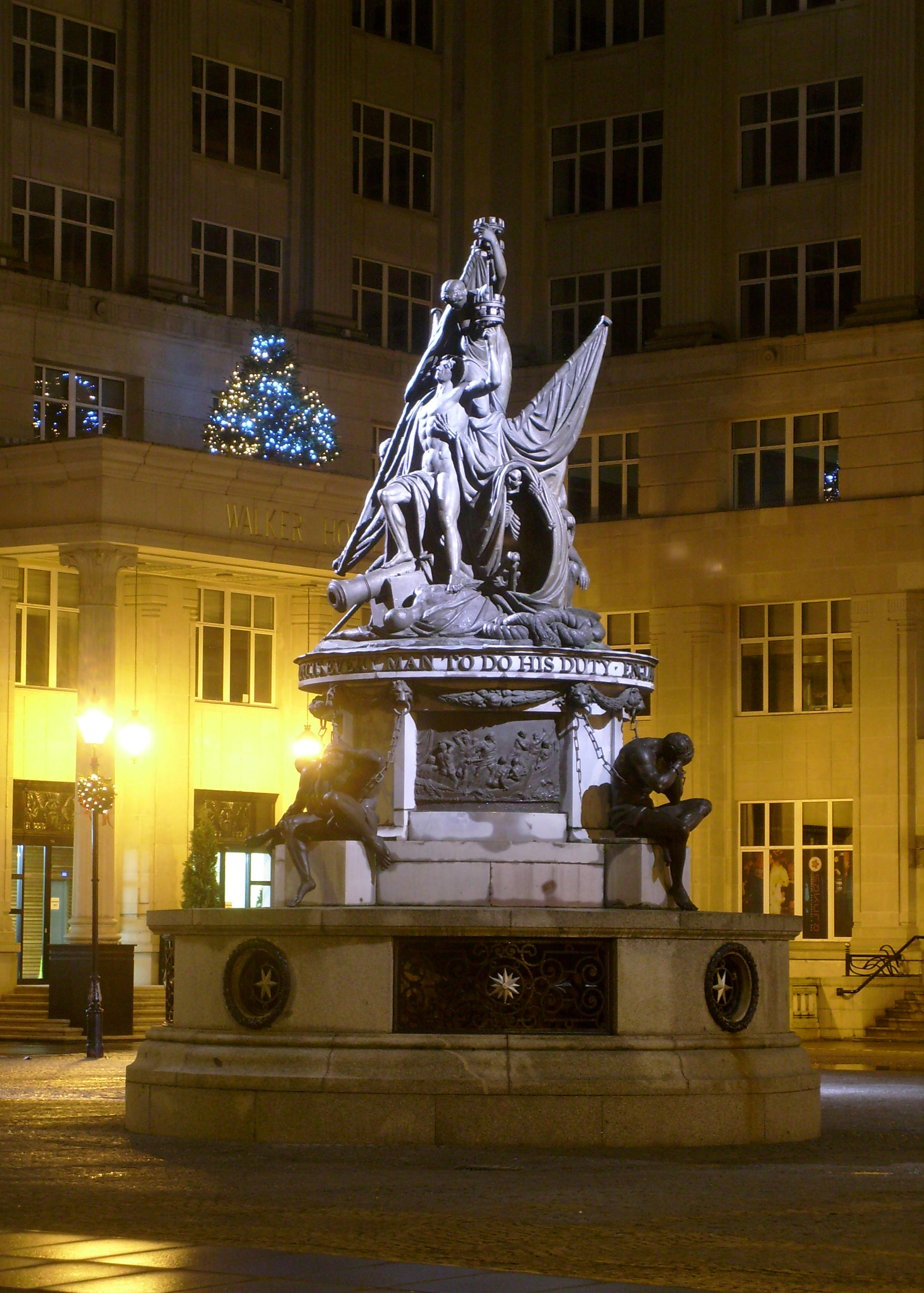
Nelson Monument at Exchange Flags. A short distance away another noted commander from the Napoleonic Wars is commemorated by Wellington's Column.

The Liverpool Biennial festival of arts runs from mid-September to late November and comprises three main sections; the International, The Independents and New Contemporaries although fringe events are timed to coincide. It was during the 2004 festival that Yoko Ono's work "My mummy was beautiful" invited controversy when photographs of a woman's breast and crotch were exhibited on the main shopping street.

=== Literature ===
Felicia Hemans (née Browne) was born in Dale Street, Liverpool, in 1793, although she later moved to Flintshire, in Wales. Felicia was born in Liverpool, a granddaughter of the Venetian consul in that city. Her father's business soon brought the family to Denbighshire in North Wales, where she spent her youth. They made their home near Abergele and St. Asaph (Flintshire), and it is clear that she came to regard herself as Welsh by adoption, later referring to Wales as "Land of my childhood, my home and my dead". Her first poems, dedicated to the Prince of Wales, were published in Liverpool in 1808, when she was only fourteen, arousing the interest of Percy Bysshe Shelley, who briefly corresponded with her.

An engraving of a painting of The Wishing Gate. by S. F. Serres was published in Fisher's Drawing Room Scrap Book, 1834 with a poetical illustration by Letitia Elizabeth Landon to which she adds the note 'I believe that to this haunted gate, a common superstition is attached, namely, that to wish, and to have that wish fulfilled, is the result of such wish being uttered while passing'. It stood on the North Shore before the docks were built and was a place where farewells could be waved to departing voyagers.

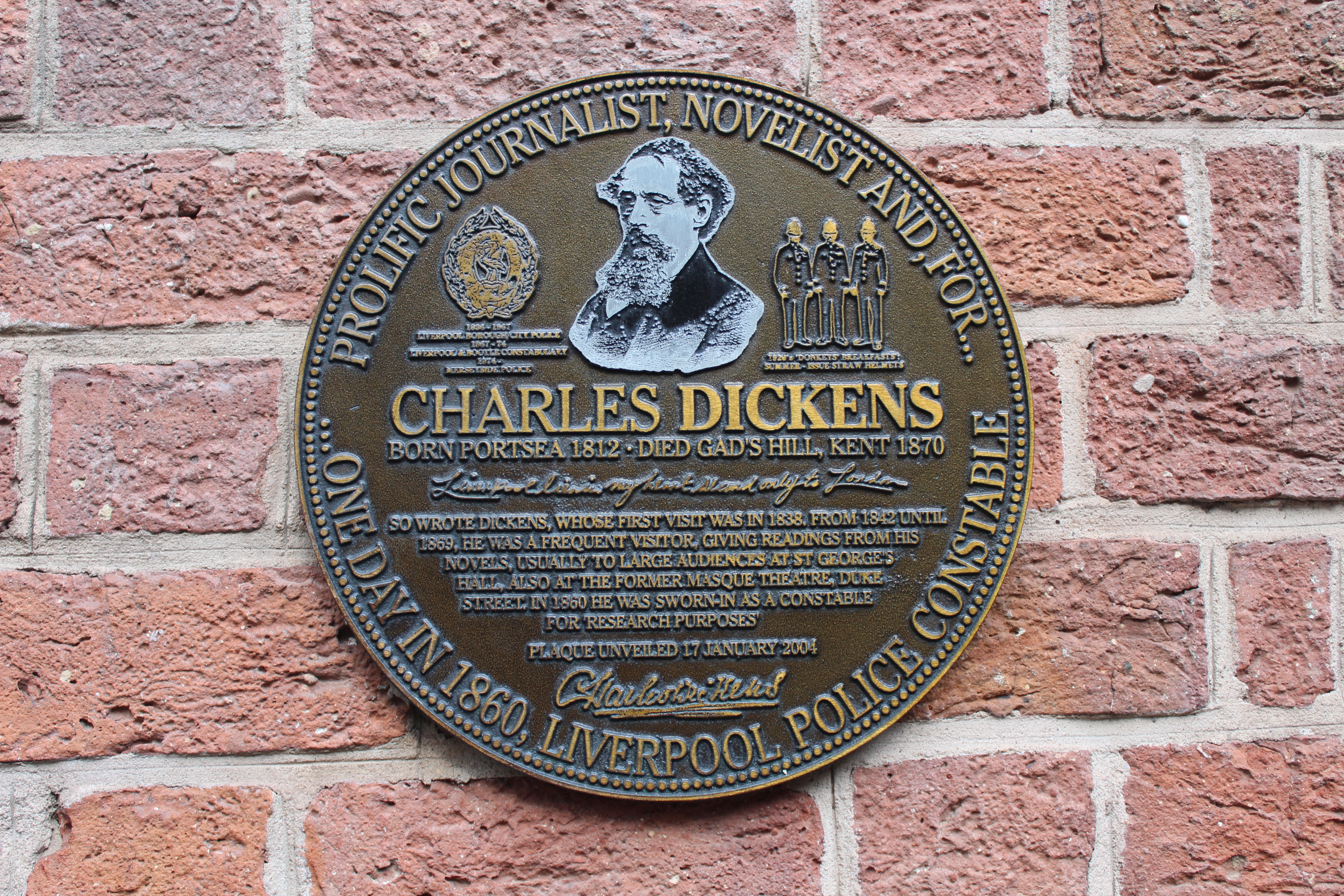
Plaque in Campbell Square commemorating Charles Dickens who from 1842 gave public readings of his novels at St George's Hall, and who for one day in 1860 was appointed a special police constable in the city while researching a novel.

A number of notable authors have visited Liverpool, including Daniel Defoe, Washington Irving, Charles Dickens, Thomas De Quincey, Herman Melville, Nathaniel Hawthorne, Gerard Manley Hopkins and Hugh Walpole. Defoe, after visiting the city, described it, as "one of the wonders of Britain in his 'Tour through England and Wales'". Melville's novel Redburn deals with the first seagoing voyage of 19 years old Wellingborough Redburn between New York and Liverpool in 1839. Largely autobiographical, the middle sections of the book are set in Liverpool and describe the young merchantman's wanderings, and his reflections. From 1842 to 1869, Dickens visited the city to give public readings of his novels. Hawthorne was stationed in Liverpool as United States consul between 1853 and 1856. Hopkins served as priest at St Francis Xavier Church, Langdale St., Liverpool, between 1879 and 81. Although he is not known to have ever visited Liverpool, Jung famously had a vivid dream of the city which he analysed in one of his works.

Her Benny, a novel telling the tragic story of Liverpool street urchins in the 1870s, written by Methodist preacher Silas K. Hocking, was a best-seller and the first book to sell a million copies in the author's lifetime. The prolific writer of adventure novels, Harold Edward Bindloss (1866–1945), was born in Liverpool.

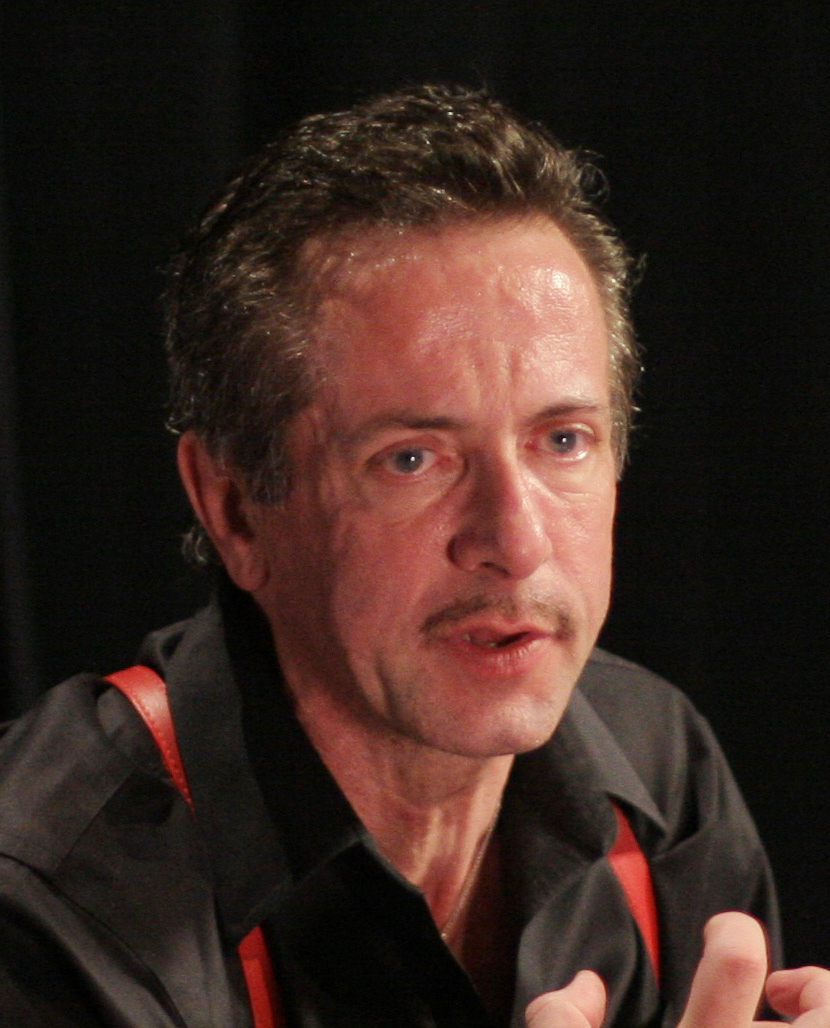
Clive Barker, Liverpool born writer of Hellraiser and creator of Candyman

The writer, docker and political activist George Garrett was born in Seacombe, on the Wirral Peninsula in 1896 and was brought up in Liverpool's South end, around Park Road, the son of a fierce Liverpool–Irish Catholic mother and a staunch 'Orange' stevedore father. In the 1920s and 1930s, his organisation within the Seamen's Vigilance Committees, unemployed demonstrations, and hunger marches from Liverpool became part of a wider cultural force. He spoke at reconciliation meetings in sectarian Liverpool, and helped found the Unity Theatre in the 1930s as part of the Popular Front against the rise of fascism, particularly its echoes in the Spanish Civil War. Garrett died in 1966.

The novelist and playwright James Hanley (1897–1985) was born in Kirkdale, Liverpool, in 1897 (not Dublin, nor 1901 as he generally implied) to a working-class family. Hanley grew up close to the docks and much of his early writing is about seamen. The Furys (1935) is first in a sequence of five loosely autobiographical novels about working-class life in Liverpool. James Hanley's brother, novelist Gerald Hanley (1916–92) was also born in Liverpool (not County Cork, Ireland, as he claimed). While he published a number of novels he also wrote radio plays for the BBC as well as some film scripts, most notably The Blue Max (1966). He was also one of several scriptwriters for a life of Gandhi (1964). Novelist Beryl Bainbridge (1932–2010) was born in Liverpool and raised in nearby Formby. She was primarily known for her works of psychological fiction, often set among the English working classes. Bainbridge won the Whitbread Awards prize for best novel in 1977 and 1996 and was nominated five times for the Booker Prize. The Times newspaper named Bainbridge among their list of "The 50 greatest British writers since 1945".

J. G. Farrell was born in Liverpool in 1935 but left at the outbreak of war in 1939. A novelist of Irish descent, Farrell gained prominence for his historical fiction, most notably his Empire Trilogy (Troubles, The Siege of Krishnapur and The Singapore Grip), dealing with the political and human consequences of British colonial rule. However, his career ended when he drowned in Ireland in 1979 at the age of 44.

Helen Forrester was the pen name of June Bhatia (née Huband) (1919–2011), who was known for her books about her early childhood in Liverpool during the Great Depression, including Twopence to Cross the Mersey (1974), as well as several works of fiction. During the late 1960s the city became well known for the Liverpool poets, who include Roger McGough and the late Adrian Henri. An anthology of poems, The Mersey Sound, written by Henri, McGough and Brian Patten, has sold well since it was first being published in 1967.

Liverpool has produced several noted writers of horror fiction, often set on Merseyside—Ramsey Campbell, Clive Barker and Peter Atkins among them. A collection of Liverpudlian horror fiction, Spook City was edited by a Liverpool expatriate, Angus Mackenzie, and introduced by Doug Bradley, also from Liverpool. Bradley is famed for portraying Barker's creation Pinhead in the Hellraiser series of films.

=== Performing arts ===
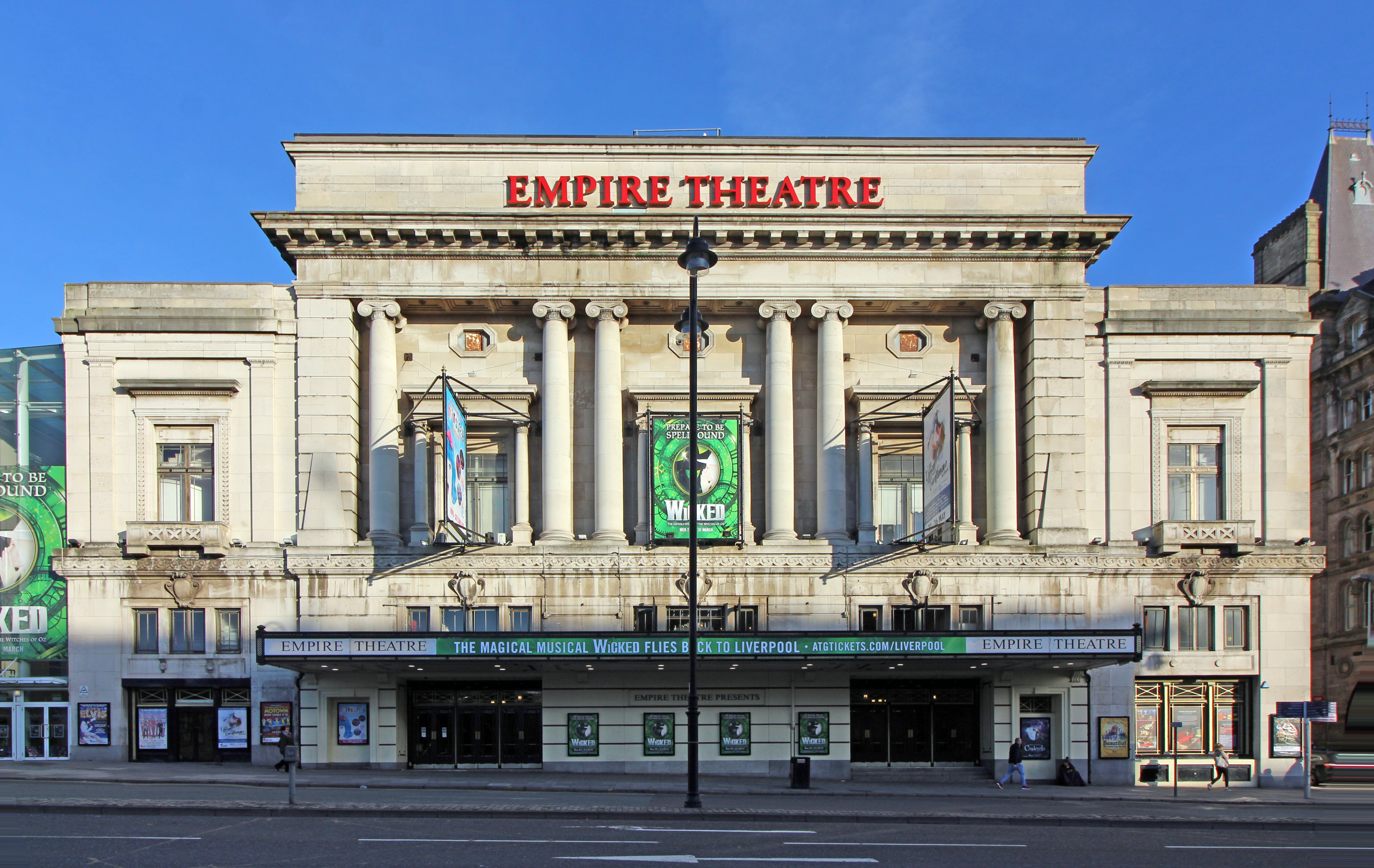
The Empire Theatre has the largest two-tier auditorium in the UK.

Liverpool also has a long history of performing arts, reflected in several annual theatre festivals such as the Liverpool Shakespeare Festival, which takes place inside Liverpool Cathedral and in the adjacent historic St James' Gardens every summer; the Everyword Festival of new theatre writing, the only one of its kind in the country; Physical Fest, an international festival of physical theatre; the annual festivals organised by Liverpool John Moores University's drama department and the Liverpool Institute for Performing Arts; and other festivals by the large number of theatres in the city, such as the Empire, Everyman, Playhouse, Royal Court, and Unity theatres.

Notable actors and actresses from Liverpool include Arthur Askey, Tom Baker, Kim Cattrall, Jodie Comer, Stephen Graham, Rex Harrison, Jason Isaacs, Tina Malone, the McGann brothers (Joe, Mark, Paul, and Stephen), David Morrissey, Elizabeth Morton, Peter Serafinowicz, Elisabeth Sladen, Alison Steadman, and Rita Tushingham. Actors and actresses from elsewhere in the world have strong ties to the city, such as Canadian actor Mike Myers (whose parents were both from Liverpool) and American actress Halle Berry (whose mother was from Liverpool).

=== Nightlife ===
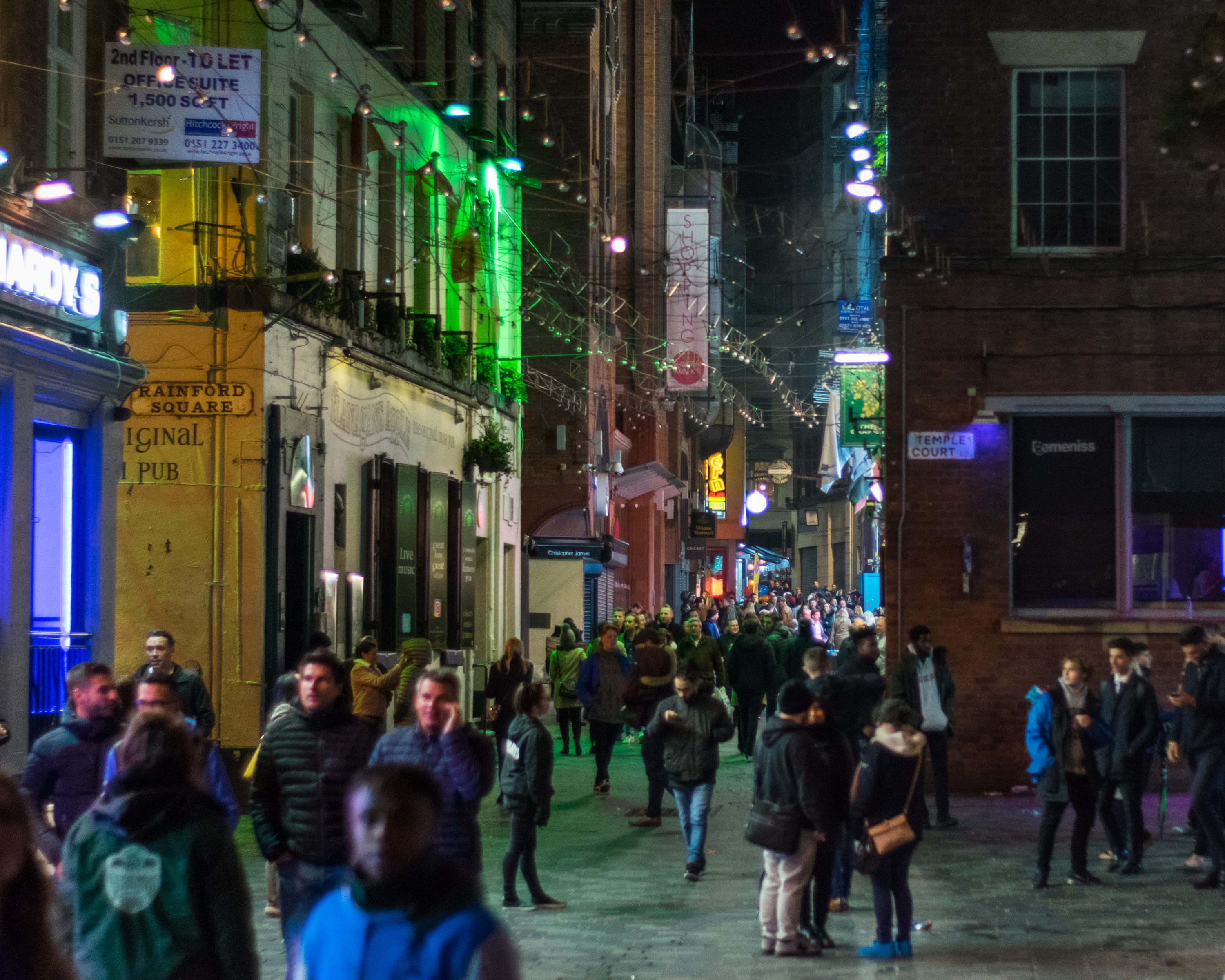
Nightlife in Mathew Street and Temple Court, Liverpool city centre

Liverpool has a thriving and varied nightlife. The majority of the city's late-night restaurants, bars, pubs, nightclubs, music venues and comedy clubs are located in a number of distinct districts.

In 2023, figures from global data company Square show that night-time spending in bars and restaurants in Liverpool city centre outperformed all major UK cities, including London.

Figures by the Liverpool BID Company suggest that the busiest nights of the week in Liverpool city centre are Friday and Saturday. Using cameras to track the flow of people in key locations between 7 pm and 4 am, at least 1.5 million people pass through the city centre every Friday night and almost 2 million people on Saturday nights. The data demonstrates that Monday night is the quietest night of the week in the city centre and footfall then increases every single night to reach its peak on Saturday nights. 125,889 people worked in the city's night time economy as of 2022, according to the Liverpool BID Company.

Liverpool's nightlife is concentrated in a number of districts including Ropewalks which comprises Concert Square, St. Peter's Square and the adjoining Seel Street and Duke Street. Other popular areas include Hardman Street, the Cavern Quarter, Baltic Triangle, Royal Albert Dock and the city's Pride Quarter, which is home to a large number of LGBT venues.

In the city's suburbs, Lark Lane in Aigburth is noted for an abundance of bars and late-night venues.

== Education ==
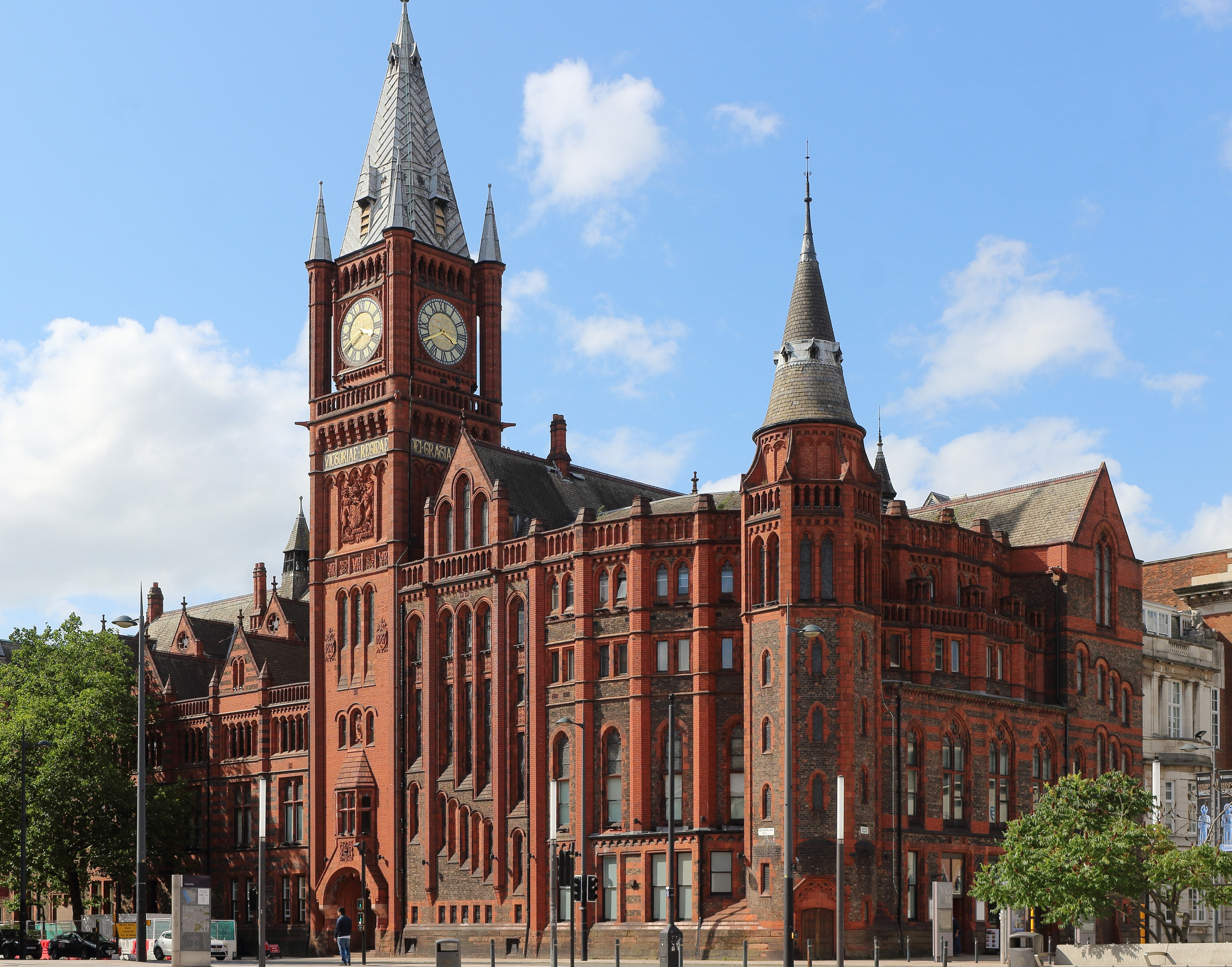
University of Liverpool's Victoria Building

In Liverpool primary and secondary education is available in various forms supported by the state including secular, Church of England, Jewish, and Roman Catholic. Islamic education is available at primary level, but there is no secondary provision. One of Liverpool's important early schools was The Liverpool Blue Coat School; founded in 1708 as a charitable school. It is now a state grammar school.

The Liverpool Blue Coat School is the top-performing school in the city with 100% 5 or more A*-C grades at GCSE resulting in the 30th best GCSE results in the country and an average point score per student of 1087.4 in A/AS levels. Other notable schools include Liverpool College founded in 1840 Merchant Taylors' School founded in 1620. Another of Liverpool's notable senior schools is St. Edward's College situated in the West Derby area of the city. Historic grammar schools, such as the Liverpool Institute High School and Liverpool Collegiate School—both closed in the 1980s—are still remembered as centres of academic excellence. Bellerive Catholic College is the city's top-performing non-selective school, based upon GCSE results in 2007.

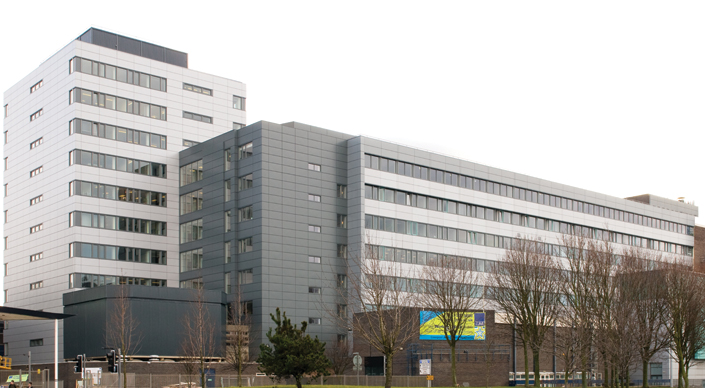
Liverpool John Moores University's James Parsons Building

Liverpool has three universities: the University of Liverpool, Liverpool John Moores University and Liverpool Hope University. Edge Hill University, founded as a teacher-training college in the Edge Hill district of Liverpool, is now located in Ormskirk in South-West Lancashire. Liverpool is also home to the Liverpool Institute for Performing Arts (LIPA).

The University of Liverpool was established in 1881 as University College Liverpool. In 1884, it became part of the federal Victoria University. Following a Royal Charter and Act of Parliament in 1903, it became an independent university, the University of Liverpool, with the right to confer its own degrees. It was the first university to offer degrees in biochemistry, architecture, civic design, veterinary science, oceanography and social science.

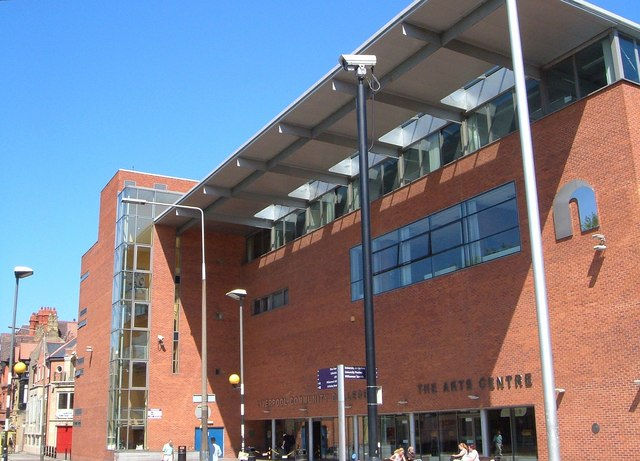
City of Liverpool College's Arts Centre

Liverpool Hope University, which was formed through the merger of three colleges, the earliest of which was founded in 1844, gained university status in 2005. It is the only ecumenical university in Europe. It is situated on both sides of Taggart Avenue in Childwall and has a second campus in the city centre (the Cornerstone).

The Liverpool School of Tropical Medicine, founded to address some of the problems created by trade, continues today as a post-graduate school affiliated with the University of Liverpool and houses an anti-venom repository.

Liverpool John Moores University was previously a polytechnic, and gained status in 1992. It is named in honour of Sir John Moores, one of the founders of the Littlewoods football pools and retail group, who was a major benefactor. The institution was previously owned and run by Liverpool City Council. It traces it lineage to the Liverpool Mechanics' institute, opened in 1823, making it by this measure England's third-oldest university.

The city has one further education college, City of Liverpool College in the city centre. Liverpool City Council operates Burton Manor, a residential adult education college in nearby Burton, on the Wirral Peninsula.

There are two Jewish schools in Liverpool, both belonging to the King David Foundation. King David School, Liverpool, is the High School and the King David Primary School. There is also a King David Kindergarten, featured in the community centre of Harold House. These schools are all run by the King David Foundation located in Harold House in Childwall; conveniently next door to the Childwall Synagogue.

== Sport ==
=== Football ===
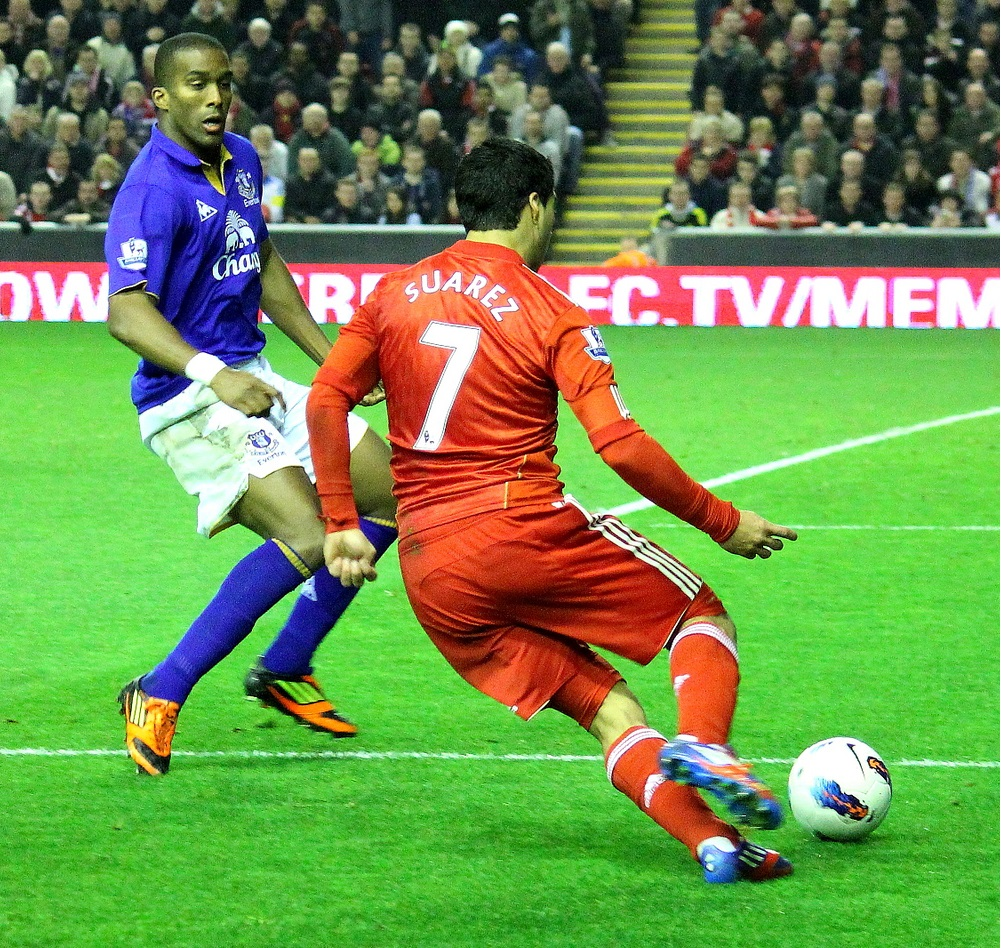
The Merseyside derby is the football match between the two biggest clubs in the city; Liverpool in red and Everton in blue

Liverpool is one of the most successful footballing cities in England, and is home to two top flight Premier League teams. Everton F.C. was founded in 1878 and was one of the twelve founder members of the Football League. It plays at Hill Dickinson Stadium. Liverpool F.C. were founded in 1892 and play at Anfield. Between them, the clubs have won 28 English First Division titles, 12 FA Cup titles, 10 League Cup titles, 6 European Cup titles, 1 FIFA Club World Cup title, 1 European Cup Winners' Cup title, 3 UEFA Cup titles, and 24 FA Charity Shields.

The two clubs contest the Merseyside derby, dubbed the 'friendly derby'. Despite the name the fixture is known for its keen rivalry, having seen more sending-offs in this fixture than any other. Unlike many other derbies it is not rare for families in the city to contain supporters of both clubs. Liverpool F.C. is the English and British club with the most European Cup titles with six, the latest in 2019.

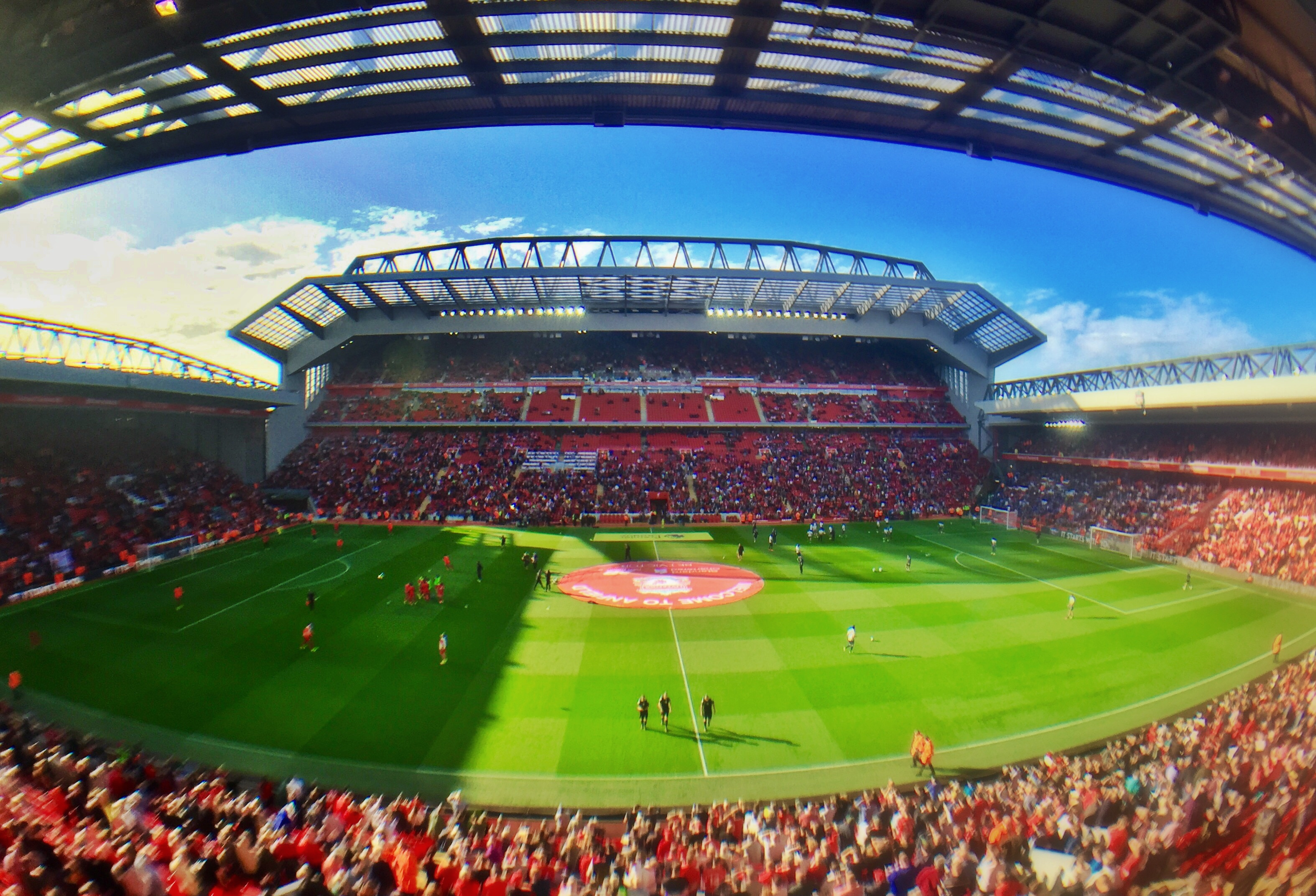
Anfield, home of Liverpool F.C.

Liverpool has played at Anfield since 1892, when the club was formed to occupy the stadium following Everton's departure due to a dispute with their landlord. Liverpool are still playing there 125 years later, although the ground has been completely rebuilt since the 1970s. The Spion Kop (rebuilt as an all-seater stand in 1994–95) was the most famous part of the ground, gaining cult status across the world due to the songs and celebrations of the many fans who packed onto its terraces. Anfield as capacity for 54,000 spectators in comfort and is a distinctive landmark in an area filled with smaller and older buildings. Liverpool club also has a multimillion-pound youth training facility called The Academy.

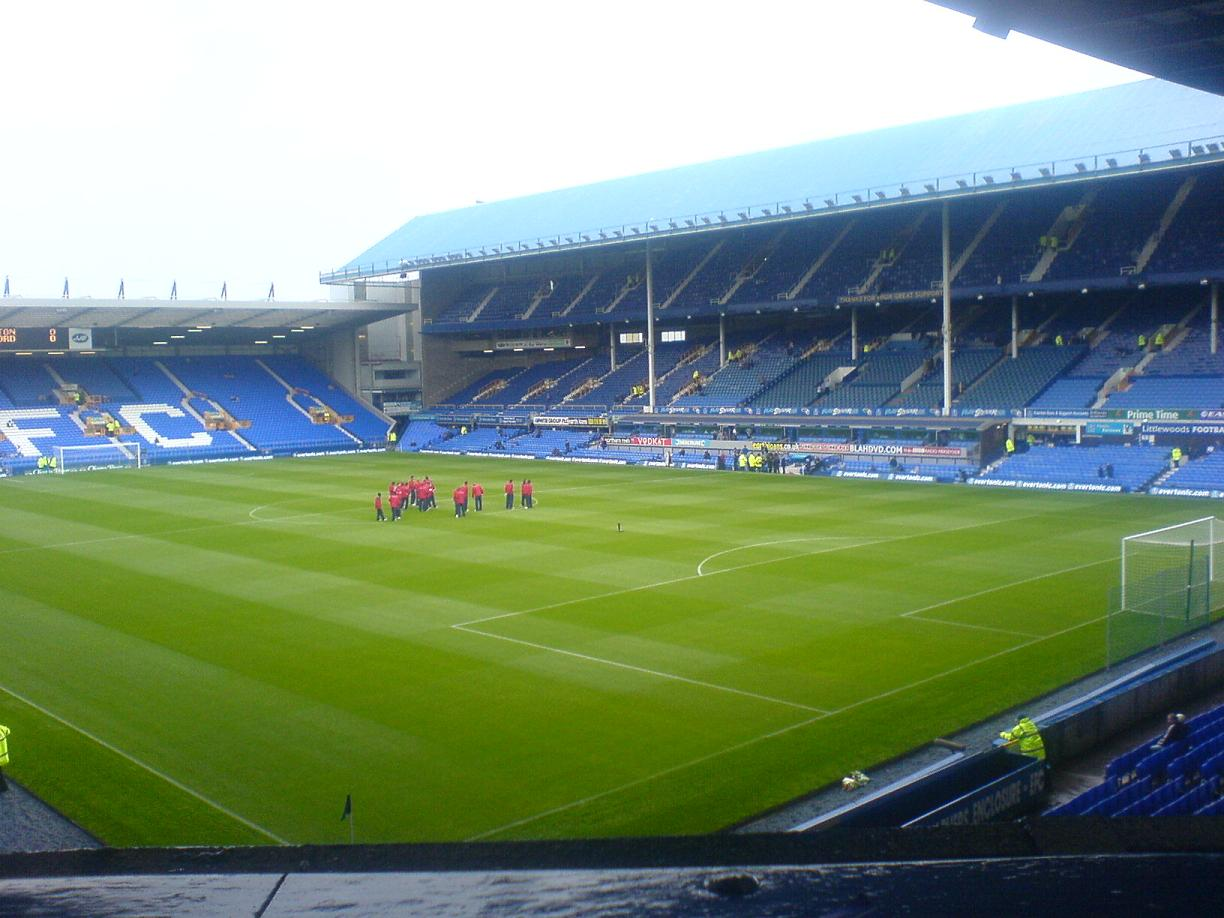
Goodison Park, home of Everton W.F.C.

After leaving Anfield in 1892, Everton moved to Goodison Park on the opposite side of Stanley Park. The ground was opened on 24 August 1892, by Lord Kinnaird and Frederick Wall of the FA but the first crowds to attend the ground saw a short athletics meeting followed by a selection of music and a fireworks display. Everton's first game there was on 2 September 1892 when they beat Bolton 4–2. It was one of the host venues during the 1966 FIFA World Cup. It now has the capacity for just under 40,000 spectators all-seated, but the last expansion took place in 1994 when a new Park End Stand gave the stadium an all-seater capacity. The Goodison Road Stand dates back to the 1970s, while the Gwladys Street Stand and Bullens Road Stand are refurbished pre-Second World War structures.

Everton has recently completed the process of relocating, with a stadium move first mooted as early as 1996. In 2003, the club were forced to abandon plans for a 55,000-seat stadium at King's Dock due to financial constraints, with further proposed moves to Kirkby (comprising part of Destination Kirkby, moving the stadium just beyond Liverpool's council boundary into Kirkby) and Walton Hall Park similarly scrapped.

The club relocated to the multimillion-pound Everton Stadium designed by the American architect Dan Meis at the nearby Bramley-Moore Dock on the River Mersey waterfront for the beginning of the 2025/26 season, with ground broken on the project in August 2021. The new stadium will have a capacity of 52,888 which could be expanded to 62,000 demand permitting and it will be a host venue for the UEFA Euro 2028. Everton also have a multimillion-pound training facility based at Finch Farm. The Everton Women's Team play in the Women's Super League and moved into Goodison Park following the men's team's exit, having previously played at Walton Hall Park Stadium.

=== Rugby league ===
Despite being a popular sport in Northern England, professional rugby league failed to develop in the Liverpool city region. Liverpool City was the city's first professional club, but only competed in the 1906–07 season where they finished 26th of 26. Despite the failure to establish a team, the Northern Union scheduled four Kangaroo Tour matches at Goodison Park in their first three tours to Great Britain between 1908 and 1922, hosting three English League XIII games and one Lancashire game.

Professional rugby league did not return to the city until 1934 with the formation of Liverpool Stanley. The following year, England played Wales at the club's ground in the 1935 European Rugby League Championship. Stanley competed until 1968 twice reaching the playoffs. The club hosted Australia in their 1956–57 tour, the first time the Kangaroos had played in Liverpool since 1922.

Professional rugby league was again absent from the city until Anfield hosted the 1989 Charity Shield where Widnes beat Wigan 27–22. Two years later, the stadium hosted the 1991 World Club Challenge where Wigan beat Penrith 21–4. Trying to capitalise on the growing interest in the sport, not just in Liverpool but across the country, St Helens (the only professional club in the wider Merseyside region) held a number of home games at Anfield in the mid to late 1990s. However wider problems with the sport as a result of the Super League war stopped this initiative.

The professional game would again be absent from city until the mid and late 2010s when Anfield again hosted the 2016 Rugby League Four Nations final, Test 2 of the 2018 Baskerville Shield, and Magic Weekend in 2019. 40,042 attended the Four Nations final.

Everton's new Bramley-Moore Dock Stadium will host Test 2 of the 2025 Ashes.

=== Boxing ===
Boxing is massively popular in Liverpool. The city has a proud heritage and history in the sport and is home to around 22 amateur boxing clubs, which are responsible for producing many successful boxers, such as Nel Tarleton, Alan Rudkin, John Conteh, Andy Holligan, Liam Smith, Paul Hodkinson, Tony Bellew and Robin Ried. The city also boasts a consistently strong amateur contingent which is highlighted by Liverpool being the most represented city on the GB Boxing team, as well as at the 2012 London Olympics, the most notable Liverpool amateur fighters include; Jimmy Lloyd, George Turpin, Tony Willis, Robin Reid and David Price who have all medalled at the Olympic Games. Boxing events are usually hosted at the Echo Arena and Liverpool Olympia within the city, although the former home of Liverpool boxing was the renowned Liverpool Stadium.

=== Horse racing ===
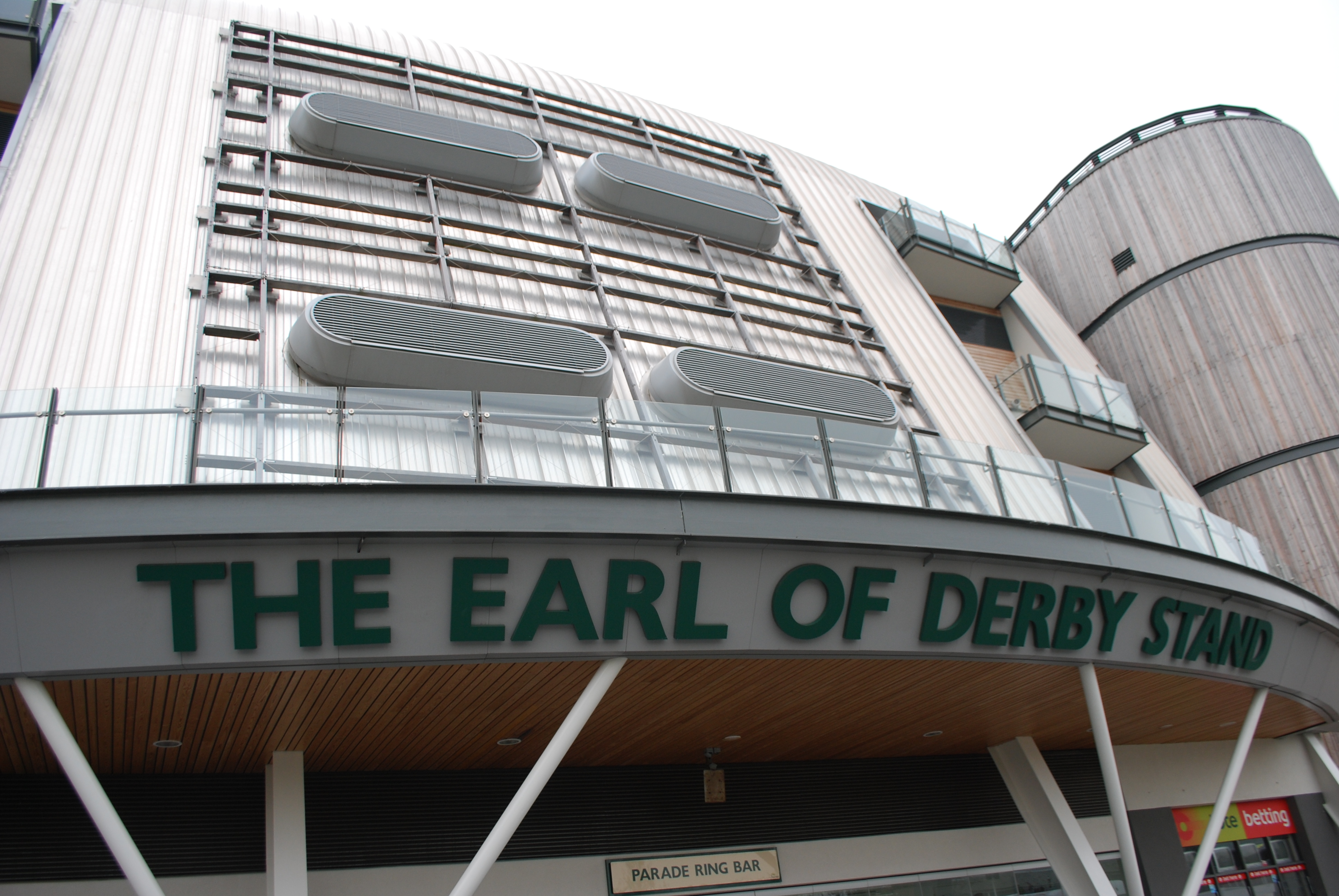
The Earl of Derby Stand at Aintree Racecourse; home of the Grand National

Aintree Racecourse in the adjacent Metropolitan Borough of Sefton is home to the world's most famous steeple-chase, the Randox Grand National which takes place annually in early April. The race meeting attracts horse owners/ jockeys from around the world to compete in the demanding 4-mile (6.5-kilometre) and 30-fence course. There have been many memorable moments of the Grand National, for instance, the 100/1 outsider Foinavon in 1967, the dominant Red Rum and Ginger McCain of the 1970s and Mon Mome (100/1) who won the 2009 meeting. In 2010, the National became the first horse race to be televised in high-definition in the UK.

=== Golf ===
The Royal Liverpool Golf Club, situated in the nearby town of Hoylake on the Wirral Peninsula, has hosted The Open Championship on a number of occasions, most recently in 2023. It also hosted the Walker Cup in 1983.

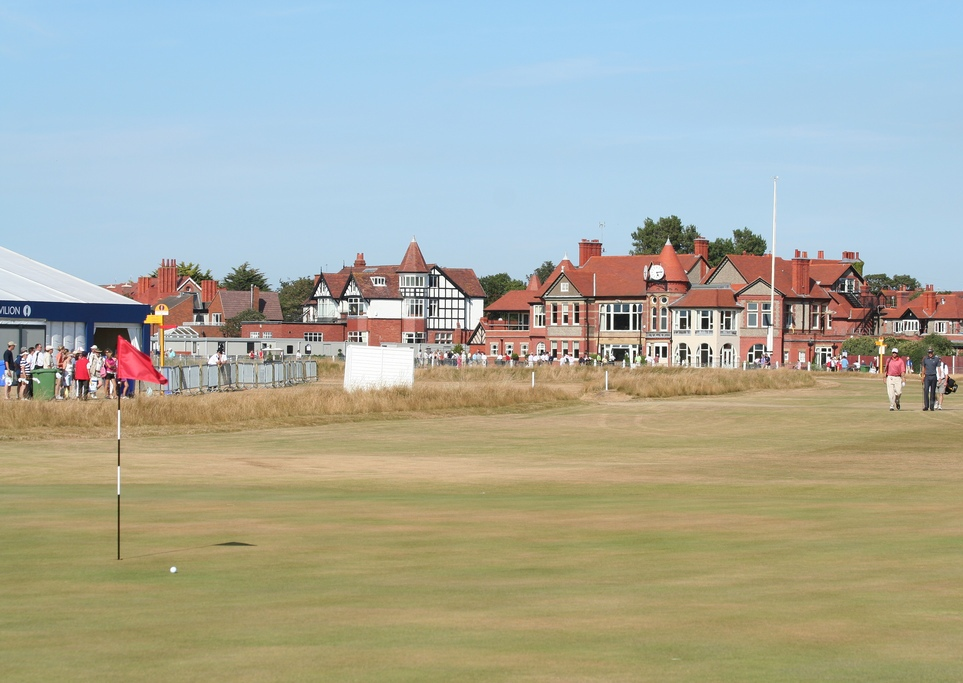
The Royal Liverpool Golf Club, Hoylake

=== Greyhound racing ===
Liverpool once contained four greyhound tracks, Seaforth Greyhound Stadium (1933–1965), Breck Park Stadium (1927–1948), Stanley Greyhound Stadium (1927–1961) and White City Stadium (1932–1973). Breck Park also hosted boxing bouts and both Stanley and Seaforth hosted Motorcycle speedway.

=== Athletics ===
Wavertree Sports Park is home to the Liverpool Harriers athletics club, which has produced such athletes as Curtis Robb, Allyn Condon (the only British athlete to compete at both the Summer and Winter Olympics), and Katarina Johnson-Thompson; Great Britain was represented by Johnson-Thompson at the 2012 London Olympics in the women's heptathlon, and she would go on to win the gold medal at the 2019 World Championships, giving Liverpool its first gold medal and breaking the British record in the process.

=== Gymnastics ===
In August 2012, Liverpool gymnast Beth Tweddle won an Olympic bronze medal in London 2012 in the uneven bars at her third Olympic Games, thus becoming the most decorated British gymnast in history. Park Road Gymnastics Centre provides training to a high level.

=== Swimming ===
Liverpool has produced several swimmers who have represented their nation at major championships such as the Olympic Games. The most notable of which is Steve Parry who claimed a bronze medal at the 2004 Athens Olympics in the 200m butterfly. Others include Herbert Nickel Haresnape, Margaret Kelly, Shellagh Ratcliffe and Austin Rawlinson. There is a purpose-built aquatics centre at Wavertree Sports Park, which opened in 2008. The City of Liverpool Swimming Club has been National Speedo League Champions 8 out of the last 11 years.

=== Cricket ===
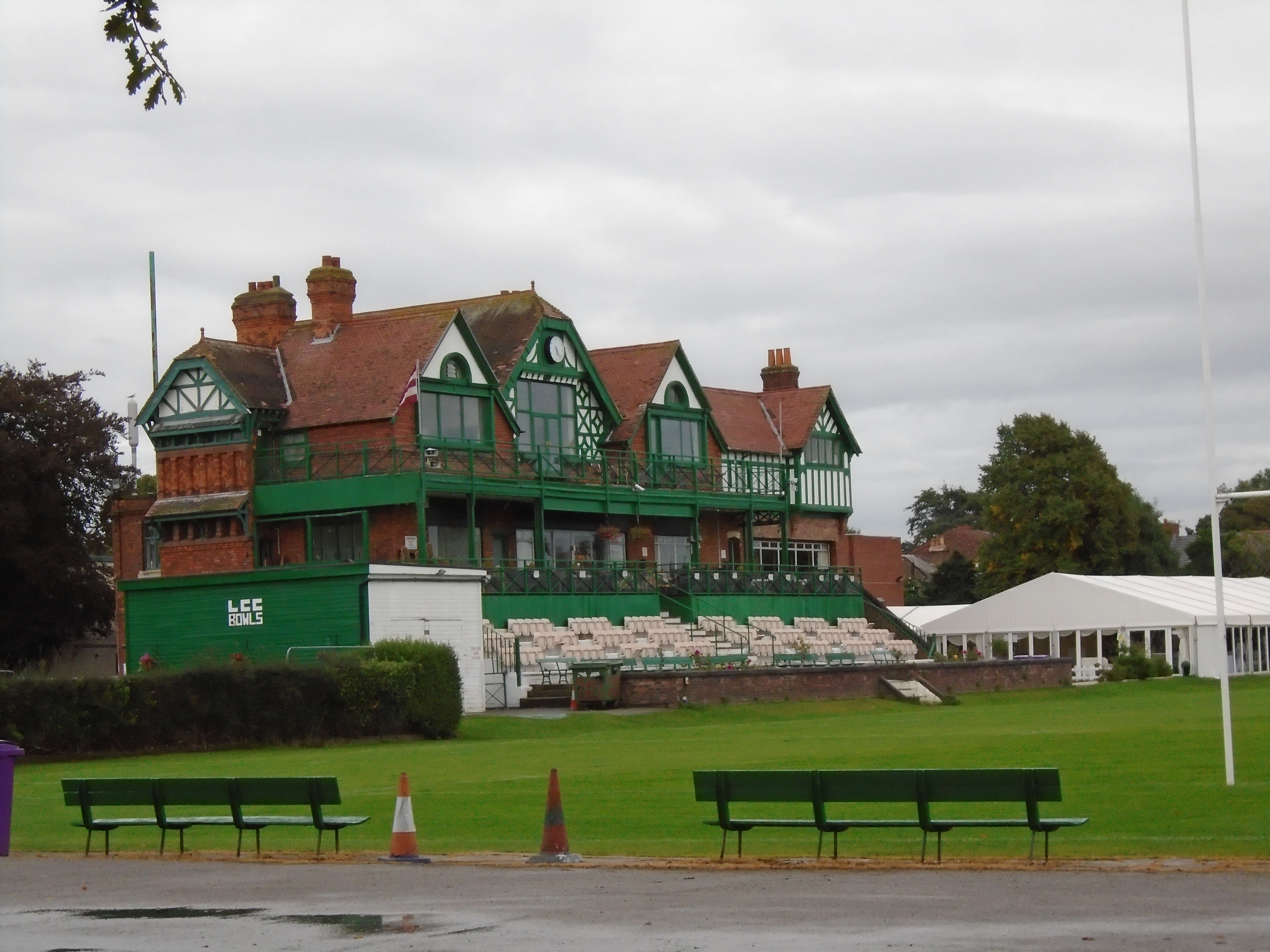
Liverpool Cricket Club

The city is the hub of the Liverpool and District Cricket Competition, an ECB Premier League. Sefton Park and Liverpool are the league's founder members based in the city with Wavertree, Alder and Old Xaverians clubs having joined the league more recently. Liverpool plays host Lancashire County Cricket Club as an outground most seasons, including six of eight home County Championship games during Lancashire's 2011 title winning campaign while Old Trafford was refurbished.

=== Tennis ===
Since 2014 Liverpool Cricket Club has played host to the annual Tradition-ICAP Liverpool International tennis tournament, which has seen tennis stars such as Novak Djokovic, David Ferrer, Mardy Fish, Laura Robson and Caroline Wozniacki. Previously this had been held at Calderstones Park, situated in Allerton in the south of the city. Liverpool Tennis Development Programme at Wavertree Tennis Centre is one of the largest in the UK.

=== Basketball ===
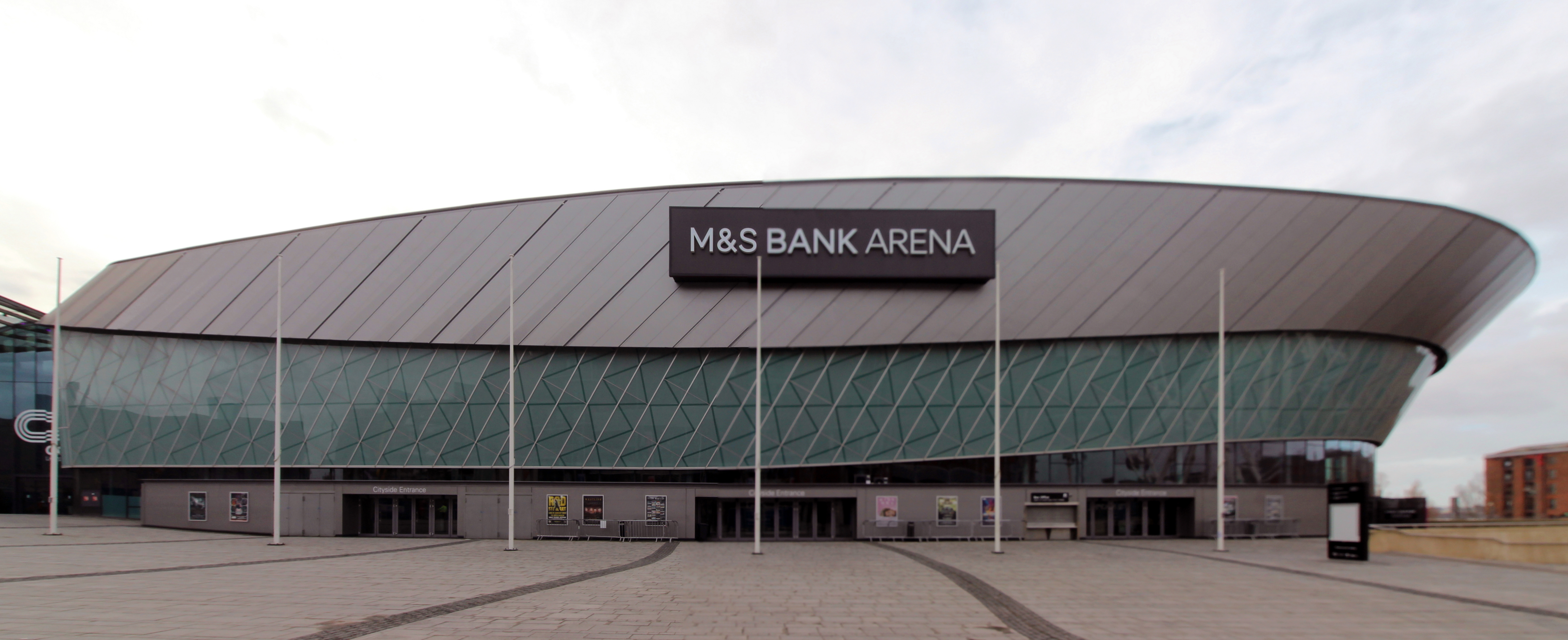
Liverpool Arena hosts numerous sporting events and was formerly the home of British Basketball League team, the Mersey Tigers.

Professional basketball came to the city in 2007 with the entry of Everton Tigers, later known as Mersey Tigers, into the elite British Basketball League. The club was originally associated with Everton F.C., and was part of the Toxteth Tigers youth development programme, which reached over 1,500 young people every year. The Tigers began to play in Britain's top league for the 2007–08 season, playing at the Greenbank Sports Academy before moving into the newly completed Echo Arena during that season. After the 2009–10 season, Everton F.C. withdrew funding from the Tigers, who then changed their name to Mersey Tigers. The club were expelled from the British Basketball League in 2013 due to financial problems.

=== Baseball ===
Liverpool is one of three cities which still host the traditional sport of British baseball and it hosts the annual England-Wales international match every two years, alternating with Cardiff and Newport. Liverpool Trojans are the oldest existing baseball club in the UK.

=== Cycling ===
The 2014 Tour of Britain cycle race began in Liverpool on 7 September, using a city centre circuit to complete 130 km (80.8 mi) of racing. The Tour of Britain took nine stages and finished in London on 14 September.

=== Other ===
A 2016 study of UK fitness centres found that, of the top 20 UK urban areas, Liverpool had the highest number of leisure and sports centres per capita, with 4.3 centres per 100,000 of the city population.

== Media ==
The city has one daily newspaper: the Echo, published by Reach plc. The Liverpool Daily Post was also published until 2013. The UK's first online-only weekly newspaper called Southport Reporter (Southport and Mersey Reporter), is also one of the many other news outlets that cover the city. The independent media organisation The Post also covers Liverpool, while Nerve magazine publishes articles and reviews of cultural events.

Liverpool TV is a local television station serving Liverpool City Region and surrounding areas. The station is owned and operated by Made Television Ltd and forms part of a group of eight local TV stations. It broadcasts from studios and offices in Liverpool.

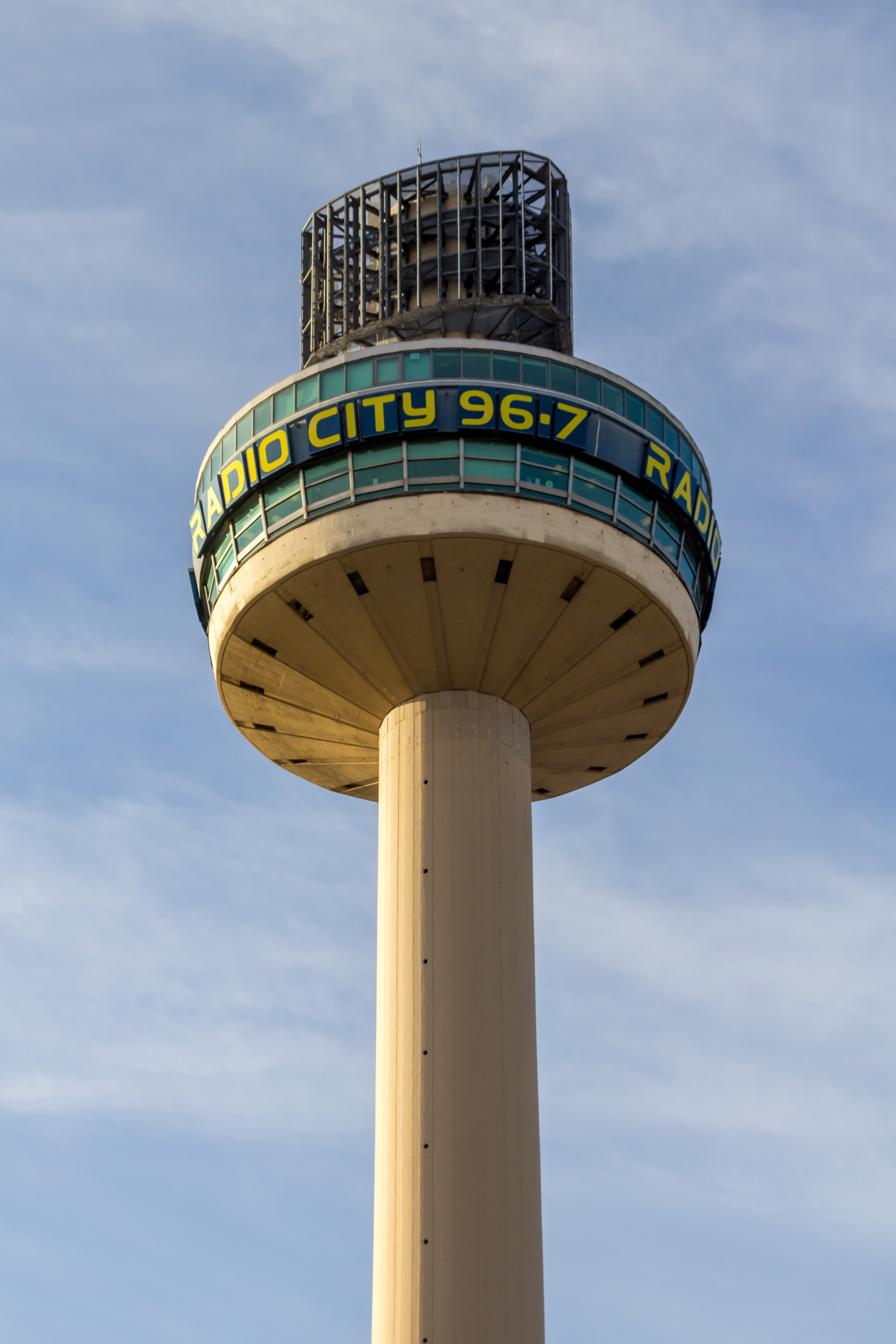
St Johns Beacon, former home of Hits Radio Liverpool and Greatest Hits Radio from 2000 to 2024

The ITV region which covers Liverpool is ITV Granada. In 2006, the Television company opened a new newsroom in the Royal Liver Building. Granada's regional news broadcasts were produced at the Royal Albert Dock News Centre during the 1980s and 1990s. The BBC also opened a new newsroom on Hanover Street in 2006.

ITV's daily magazine programme This Morning was broadcast from studios at Royal Albert Dock until 1996, when production was moved to London. Granada's short-lived shopping channel "Shop!" was also produced in Liverpool until it was cancelled in 2002.

Liverpool is the home of the TV production company Lime Pictures, formerly Mersey Television, which produced the now-defunct soap operas Brookside and Grange Hill. It also produces the soap opera Hollyoaks, which was formerly filmed in Chester and began on Channel 4 in 1995. All three series were/are largely filmed in the Childwall area of Liverpool.

Radio stations include BBC Radio Merseyside, Hits Radio Liverpool, Greatest Hits Radio, Capital Liverpool, In Demand Radio and Liverpool Live Radio.

Liverpool has also featured in films; see List of films set in Liverpool for some of them. In films the city has "doubled" for London, Paris, New York, Chicago, Moscow, Dublin, Venice and Berlin.

== Notable people ==
See Category:People from Liverpool

== International links ==
=== Twin cities ===
Liverpool is twinned with:

- Surabaya, Indonesia (2017)
- Birmingham, Alabama, United States (2015)
- Cologne, Germany (1952)
- Dublin, Ireland (1997)
- Johor Bahru, Malaysia
- Medan, Indonesia
- Odesa, Odesa Oblast, Ukraine
- Penang, Malaysia
- Rio de Janeiro, Brazil (2003)
- Shanghai, China (1999)
- Ho Chi Minh City, Vietnam (2025)

=== Friendship links ===
Liverpool has friendship links (without formal constitution) with the following cities:

- Givenchy-lès-la-Bassée, Pas-de-Calais, France
- Halifax, Nova Scotia, Canada
- Havana, La Habana, Cuba
- La Plata, Buenos Aires Province, Argentina
- Memphis, Tennessee, US
- Minamitane, Kagoshima Prefecture, Japan
- Naples, Campania, Italy
- New Orleans, Louisiana, US
- Ponsacco, Tuscany, Italy
- Râmnicu Vâlcea, Vâlcea County, Romania
- Valparaíso, Valparaíso Province, Chile
- Guadalajara, Jalisco, Mexico

=== Consulates ===
The first overseas consulate of the United States was opened in Liverpool in 1790, and it remained operational for almost two centuries. Today, a large number of consulates are located in the city serving Chile, Denmark, Estonia, Finland, France, Germany, Hungary, Iceland, Italy, Netherlands, Norway, Romania, Sweden and Thailand. Tunisian & Ivory Coast Consulates are located in the neighbouring Metropolitan Borough of Sefton.

== Freedom of the City ==
The following people and military units have received the Freedom of the City of Liverpool.

=== Individuals ===
- List of Freemen of the City of Liverpool.

=== Military units ===
Unit	Date
Duke of Lancaster's Regiment	14 September 2008.
208 Battery 103rd Regiment Royal Artillery	14 October 2017.
8th Engineer Brigade Royal Engineers	11 December 2020
HMS Prince of Wales	6 December 2024

=== Organisations and groups ===
- The Pain Relief Foundation: 3 March 2010.
- War Widows Association (Merseyside Branch): 1 December 2014.
- The Whitechapel Centre: 5 October 2016.
- The Parachute Regiment Association (Liverpool Branch): 24 October 2021.
- The Royal Signals Association (Liverpool Branch): 26 November 2021.

== See also ==
- 2008 European Amateur Boxing Championships
- Atlantic history
- Big Dig (Liverpool)
- Healthcare in Liverpool
- History of slavery
- International Garden Festival
- List of films and television shows set in Liverpool
- List of hotels in Liverpool
- Magistrates Courts, Liverpool
- Triangular
- Williamson Tunnels
- Category: Culture in Liverpool
- Liver bird
- 1911 Liverpool general transport strike
- 1345 Liverpool riot
