= List of films and television shows shot in Liverpool =

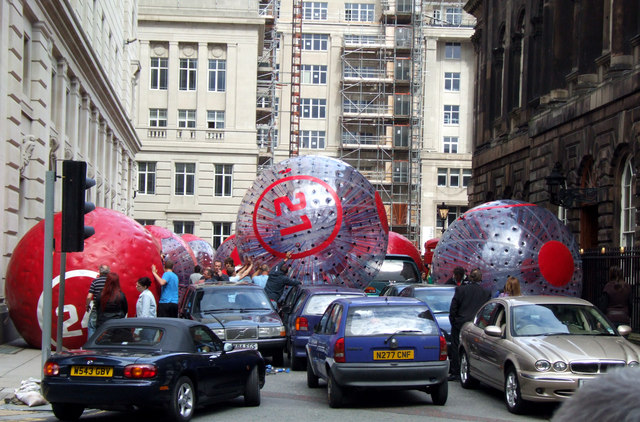
Filming for a Ladbrokes Bingo advert, taking place just off Water Street in Liverpool City Centre

The city of Liverpool, England, is a popular location for the filming and setting of films and television shows, both fictional and real. The following article provides a list of films and television shows which have been shot in Liverpool. The list includes a wide array of films and TV shows, ranging from those that were almost entirely shot and set in the city (e.g. The 51st State, Brookside) to those where only a small number of scenes were set or shot in Liverpool (e.g. Across the Universe).

Media is an important component of Liverpool's economy and in 2019 brought over £17.6m into the local area, with 324 productions racking up 1,750 production days. After London, it is the most filmed city in the United Kingdom. The Liverpool Film Office, founded in 1989, was the first of its kind in the United Kingdom and along with North West Vision and Media and the UK Film Council acts to promote the city to film and television producers. In addition to attracting outside producers, Liverpool is also home to Lime Pictures, the UK's largest independent television production company.

Liverpool's rich architectural base means it is frequently used as a double for major cities across the globe, including Chicago, London, Moscow, New York, Paris and Rome. It is also able to utilise a large number of historic sites within the city that are openly available for filming, including the now decommissioned courtrooms of St. George's Hall, or the nineteenth century warehouses around Stanley Dock.

== Films shot in Liverpool ==
Title	Year	Notes	Ref
The 51st State	2001	Drug-related comedy. Filming took place at the India Buildings in Water Street and on Liverpool Docks as well as several other locations in and around Liverpool.	
'71	2014	Thriller set in Northern Ireland in 1971 with Liverpool doubling for Belfast.	
A Day in Liverpool	1929	A city symphony film covering life in Liverpool in the 1920s.	
Across the Universe	2007	A love story crafted around several Beatles songs.	
Alfie	2004	Jude Law starred in the remake of the Michael Caine original, with Liverpool doubling for New York City	
The Almond and the Seahorse	2021	Film adaptation of Kaite O’Reilly's stage play, starring Rebel Wilson, Charlotte Gainsbourg, Trine Dyrholm and Meera Syal. Filming took place around the World Museum and Central Library as well as in Wirral.	
Al's Lads	2002	Known as Capone's Boys for its US release, Liverpool doubles for Chicago	
Amazing Grace	2026	A film about the relationship between a suicidal man and a volunteer on a crisis phone helpline.	
The Arrest of Goudie	1901	Possibly the world's first filmed crime reconstruction, by Mitchell and Kenyon	
Awaydays	2009	Crime drama about football hooliganism, starring Stephen Graham	
An Awfully Big Adventure	1995	Drama about a Liverpool theatre company in 1947; although establishing shots were filmed in Liverpool, most of the location shooting was in Dublin	
Backbeat	1994	Drama about the early days of the days of the Beatles, particularly their Hamburg days	
The Batman	2020	St George's Hall and the Liver Building was used for filming.	
The Batman: Part II	2026	Sequel to the 2020 Batman film, filming took place around St Georges Hall, the Birkenhead Tunnel and in other locations around the city centre.	
Blood on the Dole	1994	Alan Bleasdale drama for Channel 4 that filmed in multiple locations across the city and the Wirral.	
Blond Fist	1991	Drama film about a female boxer from Liverpool.	
Bolan's Shoes	2023	Drama about the lives of several children growing up in an orphanage in Liverpool and how glam rock band T. Rex influenced their lives.	
Business as Usual	1987	Drama set and filmed in Liverpool starring John Thaw and Glenda Jackson.	
Captain America: The First Avenger	2011	Stanley Dock doubles as docks in Brooklyn, New York	
Chariots of Fire	1981	Liverpool Town Hall was used, while the Bebington Oval in Wirral doubled as the Olympic Stadium and beach scenes were shot at New Brighton.	
Charlie Noades R.I.P.	2009	Family comedy.	
Clayface	2025	DC Comics adaptation of the character of the same name. Filming took place in multiple locations, including the Cunard Building, Derby Square, Philharmonic Hall and Water Street.	
Coast to Coast	1987	Comedy thriller starring Lenny Henry that was set and filmed in Liverpool.	
Creed	2015	Spin off from the Rocky series of films. Goodison Park was used as a filming location.	
Dalíland	2021	Biopic of Salvador Dalí starring Ben Kingsley, with Liverpool doubling for New York.	
Dark Summer	1994	Urban love story set in Liverpool.	
Dead Man's Cards	2006	Thriller about two bouncers and gun culture	
Digital Reaper	2004	Thriller, set in and filmed New York and Liverpool. Also known as Dot.Kill	
Distant Voices, Still Lives	1988	1940s and 1950s Terence Davies period drama set in Liverpool.	
Downtime	1997	Thriller starring Paul McGann and Susan Lynch	
The Dressmaker	1988	Adaptation of the Beryl Bainbridge novel, starring Joan Plowright, Billie Whitelaw and Pete Postlethwaite	
Fackham Hall	2025	Period satirical comedy film set in 1930s England. Knowsley Hall was used as Fackham Hall with filming also taking place in Thornton Hough.	
Fantastic Beasts and Where to Find Them	2016	Liverpool doubled as 1920s New York City with St Georges Hall and the Cunard Building being used extensively.	
Fast & Furious 6	2013	Although the featured chase is set in a tunnel in London, the chase actually was filmed in the Queensway Tunnel.	
Ferry 'Cross the Mersey	1965	Film musical featuring Gerry & The Pacemakers	
Film Stars Don't Die in Liverpool	2017	One of the Mersey Ferries were used as well as locations in the city centre and Toxteth. Liverpool also doubles as New York City.	
Florence Foster Jenkins	2016	Liverpool doubled as 1940s New York with Water Street, the Cunard Building and Liver Building featuring.	
Fountains of Youth	2024	Heist film for Apple+ starring John Krasinski and Natalie Portman. Filming took place around Exchange Flags and St George's Hall.	
The Fruit Machine	1988	British thriller set and filmed in Liverpool.	
Genius	2016	Biopic of Maxwell Perkins, US book editor who discovered authors Ernest Hemingway, F. Scott Fitzgerald and Thomas Wolfe.	
Going Off Big Time	2000	Gangster & crime film that was set and filmed in and around Liverpool.	
Grow Your Own	2007	Comedy about a group of refugees given allotments, starring Benedict Wong and Eddie Marsden.	
Gumshoe	1971	Dark comedy about a would-be private eye, played by Albert Finney	
Harry Potter and the Deathly Hallows	2010	The interior of the Queensway Tunnel was used for part of a chase sequence.	
Heads of State	2025	Amazon Prime action film starring John Cena and Idris Elba. Filming took place in the Port of Liverpool building and St Georges Hall	
Hear My Song	1991	Drama based on the life of tenor Josef Locke. Partially set and filmed in Liverpool.	
Holy Cross	2003	RTE / BBC co-production dramatising the Holy Cross dispute. The film was recorded in Liverpool as its subject was deemed too sensitive to film in Belfast.	
The Hunt for Red October	1989	Liverpool Town Hall was used for exterior shots along with William Brown Street to double for a snow-filled Moscow.	
I Thank a Fool	1962	Crime thriller starring Susan Hayward and Peter Finch.	
In the Name of the Father	1993	Biopic about the Guildford Four, partly filmed in St. George's Hall	
Jack Ryan	2012	Queensway tunnel side entrance doubles as New York's Wall Street underpass. Other locations include Liverpool Docks and Duke Street.	
Kicks	2010	BBC Films production of a story of two teenage girls who bond over their crush on a footballer.	
Let Him Have It	1991	Dramatisation of the Craig & Bentley case, shot in Liverpool and New Brighton but set in Croydon	
Letter to Brezhnev	1985	Romantic comedy film set and shot in Liverpool.	
Liam	2000	Stephen Frears' adaptation of Joseph Mckeown's novel Back Crack Boy	
The Long Day Closes	1992	Drama written and directed by Terence Davies	
Longford	2006	Television dramatisation of Lord Longford's attempts to achieve parole for Myra Hindley	
The Magnet	1950	Ealing Comedy filmed in New Brighton and Liverpool	
The Man Who Stole Portugal	2026	Dramatisation of a true story of financial fraud, starring James Nelson-Joyce, Dominic West & Richard E Grant. Filming took place at Croxteth Hall and in the Georgian Quarter.	
Midas Man	2021	Film detailing the life of Beatles manager Brian Epstein, with filming taking place at multiple locations across the city.	
Millions	2004	Danny Boyle-directed comedy-drama	
Morning in the Streets	1959	BBC film about life in a northern city.	
Munich: Edge of War	2021	Netflix adaptation of the Robert Harris novel.	
My Kingdom	2001	Crime film starring Richard Harris, Lynn Redgrave and Jimi Mistry.	
Occupy!	1976	Story of a worker occupation at a Kirkby factory, starring Bill Nighy, Peter Postlethwaite and Julie Walters	
Official Secrets	2018	The interior of St George's Hall was used.	
Of Time and the City	2008	Documentary film directed by Terrence Davies depicting life in Liverpool in the 1950 and 1960s.	
The Parole Officer	2001	Comedy film that used a bank on Castle Street as the location of a heist.	
Penny Paradise	1938	Comedy film set on the tug boats of the River Mersey.	
Perduto	2024	Short film about a child whose father is interned as an enemy alien in World War 2 Britain. Filming took place in Wirral and Liverpool.	
Priest	1994	Jimmy McGovan drama about a priest's conflict of belief	
The Reckoning	1969	Crime drama set and filmed in and around Liverpool	
Revengers Tragedy	2002	Film adaptation of the 1606 play The Revenger's Tragedy	
Rich Deceiver	1995	TV movie about a couple who win on the pools.	
Shooters	2001	Channel 4 film.	
A Town In Nova Scotia	2026	BBC Film production featuring Bill Nighy. Filming took place in Liverpool and the Wirral.	
Violent Playground	1958	"Struggle between a Liverpool Juvenile Liaison officer and a young and dangerous pyromaniac"	
Virgin of Liverpool	2002	Family comedy set and filmed in Liverpool	
The Crew	2008	Crime drama partially set and filmed in Liverpool.	
No Surrender	1985	Black comedy about a group of Catholic Nationalists and Protestant Unionists forced to spend New Year's Eve together in Liverpool	
Nowhere Boy	2009	Biopic of the early life of John Lennon	
Route Irish	2010	Ken Loach drama examining British soldiers returning from service in Iraq	
Salvage	2009	Horror film set in Liverpool. Partially filmed on the former set of Brookside.	
Sherlock Holmes	2009	Guy Ritchie directed tale of Sherlock Holmes	
Shirley Valentine	1989	Film adaptation of the Willy Russell play.	
Tolkien	2017	Biographical film about the life of J. R. R. Tolkien.	
Three and Out	2008	Black comedy starring Mackenzie Crook, Colm Meaney, Gemma Arterton and Imelda Staunton	
Three Businessmen	1998	Alex Cox comedy about business men trying to find a meal in Liverpool.	
Under the Mud	2009	Comedy following a day in the life of a family from Garston	
Under the Skin	1997	Drama film set in Liverpool over a period of two months.	
Waterfront	1949	Drama set in depression-era Liverpool	
Yentl	1983	Romantic musical drama directed, co-written, co-produced and starring Barbra Streisand. The closing scenes were filmed on the Manxman passenger ferry on the River Mersey.	
Yesterday	2018	Danny Boyle musical comedy. Filming took place on Penny Lane and other areas around the city including the Birkenhead Tunnel and Lime Street Station.	

== Television shows filmed in Liverpool ==
Title	Year	Notes	Ref
A Gentleman in Moscow	2023	Paramount+ and Showtime series starring Ewan McGregor based on the Amor Towles novel.	
Andy and The Band	2023	Children's BBC show	
Anthony	2020	BBC One dramatisation of the life of murdered teenager Anthony Walker, which used County Sessions House for court scenes.	
Antiques Roadshow	1979–present	St. George's Hall has been used as a location on several occasions.	
Archie	2023	ITVX biographical story of the life of Cary Grant.	
Army of Shadows	2026	Channel 4 thriller set in an alternate post-WW2 Britain. Filming took place in the city centre, town hall and Sefton Park, which was turned into a prison camp.	
Between the Lines	1992	The episode "Lest Ye Be Judged" was set in and around Liverpool and New Brighton.	
Boys from the Blackstuff	1982	Five episodes running from 10 October to 7 November 1982	
Bread	1986–1991	Filmed in and around the Dingle area of the city	
Broadchurch	2017	ITV drama, scenes for series 3 were filmed at the Liverpool docks.	
Broken	2016	BBC Jimmy McGovern drama starring Sean Bean and Anna Friel.	
Brookside	1982–2003	Channel 4 soap opera set in a fictional Liverpool street.	
Bulletproof	2017	Sky drama, filmed in County Sessions House as well as several streets around Liverpool and the Birkenhead tunnel.	
The Bullion Boys	1993	Television drama based on the true story of how Britain's gold reserves were moved to Liverpool during the Second World War	
The Cage	2025	BBC crime drama starring Sheridan Smith. Filming took place around the city centre.	
Casualty	2011	Used Liverpool Lime Street station and various locations in Anfield for an episode in Series 26 of the long-running series, which is usually filmed in Cardiff.	
The City & the City	2017	Used Liverpool Town Hall, Old Hall Street, Cotton Exchange, County Sessions House and Martins Bank Building.	
COBRA	2020–2023	Sky TV political thriller starring Robert Carlyle and Victoria Hamilton.	
Coleen Rooney: The Real Wagatha Story	2023	Disney+ dramatisation of the Rooney - Vardy libel case, which used County Sessions House for the court scenes.	
The Crown	2018	Netflix historical drama based on the life of Queen Elizabeth II. Liverpool doubled for 1960s Washington DC with the Cunard Building, Royal Liver Building and North John Street being used.	
Close to the Enemy	2016	Martins Bank Building, the Adelphi, Croxteth Hall and the docks were all used for post-WW2 Britain.	
Curfew	2018	Water Street, Rumford Street and Formby Beach were used in for the filming of the Sky One / NOW TV drama.	
The Curse	2021	1980's crime comedy, filmed for Channel 4.	
Das Boot	2019	TV series based on the Lothar-Gunther Buchheim novel. The Cunard Building and Water Street were turned into 1940s New York and the sandhills in Sefton were used for the US state of Maine.	
David Copperfield	1999	BBC & WGBH adaption of the Charles Dickens story.	
Dead Hot	2024	Amazon Prime / ITV Studios comedy thriller.	
Desperate Scousewives	2011	Structured reality television series following the next generation of Liverpudlians determined to show the UK just what they're all about.	
Dockers	1999	Channel Four drama about the Liverpool dockers' 1995 to 1998 strike	
Doctor Who	2021	BBC science fiction drama. Filming took place at the Albert Dock, Liverpool Museum and the Metropolitan Cathederal.	
The English Game	2019	A six-part Netflix drama created by Downton Abbey creator Julian Fellowes, charting the origins and development of football.	
Eurovision 2023	2023	With 2022 winners Ukraine unable to host due to the Russian invasion, Liverpool hosted the competition in the Liverpool Arena, additionally using the Walker Art Gallery for the "Turquoise Carpet" opening event.	
A Family at War	1970–1972	ITV WW2 drama	
The Family Pile	2022	ITV comedy series that filmed across Liverpool and in Wirral.	
The Feed	2019	Liverpool doubled as London for exterior filming for the Amazon Prime drama, with shooting taking place around the Pier Head.	
Flog It!	2002	St. George's Hall has been a location on several occasions.	
The Forsyte Saga	2001	Remake of the classic period drama, with several locations in and around the city being used for Victorian Britain.	
Foyles War	2015	The final series made extensive use of the city, with Liverpool doubling as London, Poland, Southampton and France.	
Funny Woman	2021	Sky TV adaptation of the Nick Hornby novel, starring Gemma Arterton	
The Gathering	2023	Channel 4 drama from the producers of Line of Duty	
G.B.H.	1990	Channel 4 production of an Alan Bleasdale drama	
Gentleman Jack	2018	BBC drama about the life of industrialist and land owner Anne Lister. Filming took place in Toxteth and Liverpool Town Hall.	
Good Cop	2012	BBC police procedural drama set and filmed in Liverpool	
Grange Hill	1978–2008	Originally filmed in London, production moved to Mersey TV's studios in Childwall in 2003	
G'wed	2023	ITVX comedy about a group of teenagers growing up in Liverpool	#
Hamburg Days	2026	UK/German TV programme detailing the Beatles' early career in 1960s Hamburg.	
Help	2021	Channel 4 Covid drama starring Jodie Comer and Stephen Graham.	
Hercule	2027	BBC detective period drama starring Edward Bluemel. Set in 1930s London but filmed in Liverpool.	
Hollyoaks	1995–present	Channel 4 young adult soap opera set in Chester but filmed in Liverpool.	
A House Through Time	2017	A four-part documentary which tells the story of the residents of a house in Falkner Street since it was built in 1842.	
Houdini & Doyle	2016	Liverpool Town Hall and Water Street were used to re-create early 1900s London.	
House of Anubis	2011–2012	Nickelodeon children's TV drama	
House of Guinness	2024	Netflix about the family and legacy of Benjamin Guinness. Filming took place on William Brown Street, Mount Street as well as at St. Georges Hall and in Sefton Park Palm House.	
In His Life: The John Lennon Story	2000	NBC British-American made-for-TV film about John Lennon's teenage years.	
Inside No. 9	2023	BBC comedy show, used Moorfields railway station as a location	
The IPCRESS File	2021	ITV dramatisation of Len Deighton's novel. Filming took place around St George's Hall, Lime Street station, Castle Street, Exchange Street West and the Philharmonic Pub on Hope Street.	
The Irregulars	2019	A Netflix production about the Baker Street Irregulars, a group of children helping Sir Arthur Conan Doyle's Sherlock Holmes with his investigations. Filming took place in the city centre using St George's Plateau, the palm house in Sefton Park and Falkner Street in the Georgian Quarter.	
It's a Scouse Life	2024	Channel 4 reality	
It's A Sin	2020	Channel 4 drama, Liverpool doubled for New York and London in the 1980s.	
Justice	2011	BBC daytime drama, set and filmed in Liverpool	
Kennedy	2026	Netflix series charting the early years of the Kennedy family. Water Street, Rumsford Street & Fenwick Street were used for 1930s US city scenes.	
Lazarus	2025	Prime video adaptation of a Harlan Coben story, starring Bill Nighy. Filming took in locations such as the Georgian Quarter, Sefton Park and Stanley Dock.	
Legacy of Spies	2026	BBC adaptation of the John le Carré’s novel The Spy Who Came In From The Cold. Filming took place around St Georges Hall and Old Hall Street.	
Legends	2025	Netflix crime thriller, about a 1990s drugs investigation. Adelphi Hotel, the Tobacco Docks and Brunswick Place were all used for filming.	
Lilies	2007	Consisted of eight episodes running from January to March 2007	
The Liver Birds	1969–1979	Revived again in 1996 and only lasted one series	
Liverpool 1	1998–1999	ITV police drama set and filmed in Liverpool	
The Mersey Pirate	1979	ITV Saturday morning children's TV show, which was set on the MV Royal Iris in Albert Dock.	
Missing You	2024	Netflix adaptation of a Harlan Coben novel, used Sefton Park as a location as well as Wirral.	
Nice Guy Eddie	2002	BBC detective drama starring Ricky Tomlinson	
The Onedin Line	1971–1980	BBC drama depicting the story of a 1880s shipping line in Liverpool.	
One Summer	1983	Five episodes running from 7 August to 4 September 1983	
Outlander	2022	Historial drama series. The Georgian Quarter was used to double up as 1770s Philadelphia	
Peaky Blinders	2013	BBC crime drama, used several locations across the city.	
Play for Today	2025	Channel 5 revival of the classic BBC series. Episode four, Special Measures, starring Jessica Plummer, was filmed in the city.	
Protection	2025	ITV witness protection drama filmed in Liverpool and Wirral.	
The Responder	2021 & 2023	BAFTA nominated BBC crime drama starring Martin Freeman. Both series were set and filmed in the city.	
Ridley Road	2021	BBC drama about an opposition group to fascism in the 1960s.	
Run Away	2025	TV adaptation of a Harlan Coben novel of the same name, starring James Nesbitt, Ruth Jones and Minnie Driver.	
Safe	2017	Netflix crime drama. Set in a fictional Cheshire gated community, filming took place at the Walker Art Gallery and a Merseyrail underground station.	
Safe House	2017	The second series made use of Liverpool for several filming locations.	
Saviour	2026	ITV courtroom thriller	
Say Nothing	2023	Disney Plus drama about a group of people growing up in 70s, 80s & 90s Belfast. Walton was used as West Belfast during the filming of the drama.	
Scully	1984	Channel 4 adaptation of an Alan Bleasdale play.	
Sexy Beast	2022	Paramount+-produced sequel to the 2000 film of the same name. Liverpool waterfront and the Anfield area were used as filming locations for 80's London.	
Stay Close	2021	Netflix adaptation of the Harlan Corben novel.	
The Stranger	2019	Netflix thriller that used Liverpool as the location for the filming of several scenes.	
The Stolen Girl	2025	Freeform & Hulu thriller, partially filmed at the Glass House in Fulwood Park.	
Such Brave Girls	2023–24	BBC3 comedy show following the lives of a dysfunctional family. Filming took place across Wirral, Knowsley and Liverpool, with locations such as the Cotton Exchange being used.	
This City is Ours	2025-2026	BBC crime drama set in Liverpool. Set in Liverpool, multiple locations across the city were used for filming.	
This is Liverpool	2014	Reality TV series	
Time	2021–2023	Both series of this BBC Jimmy McGovern prison drama were filmed in Liverpool and the wider city region	
Timewasters	2017	Set in 1920's London, Martins Bank Building was used along with Croxteth Hall, the Athenaeum and streets in Toxteth.	
Tin Star	2019	Sky Atlantic drama starring Tim Roth. The third series is set and filmed in Liverpool. Filming took place off North John Street in the city centre.	
The Tower	2022	The second series of the ITV police series was filmed around Liverpool, using locations such as Martins Bank, the Hilton Hotel and Vauxhall Road.	
The War of the Worlds	2018	BBC production of the H. G. Wells alien invasion story. Filming took place in Eldon Grove in Vauxhall, St Georges Hall and the Palm House in Sefton Park.	
Toxic Town	2023	Netflix drama starring Jodie Whittaker, Rory Kinnear and Robert Carlyle about the Corby toxic waste scandal.	
Unforgivable	2025	BBC drama written by Jimmy McGovern	
Utopia	2013–2014	Channel 4 thriller/drama TV series, filmed in multiple locations across the city	
Victoria	2018	ITV drama about the life of Queen Victoria. Filming took place in the city's Georgian Quarter, using locations in and around Falkner Square Gardens, Huskisson Street and Bedford Street.	
Waiting for the Out	2025	BBC drama based on Andy West's memoir, The Life Inside	
Watching	1987–1993	ITV comedy the filmed and set across Liverpool and Wirral.	
Waterfront Beat	1990–91	BBC police drama series set in docks area produced by Phil Redmond	
What Now?	1986	Phil Redmond directed drama shown in 6 episodes on Channel 4 regarding teenage aspirations	
Without Guilt	2023	TV adaptation of the Charlotte Link detective novel.	
The Witness for the Prosecution	2016	BBC dramatisation of an Agatha Christie short story. Filming took place in one of the courtrooms at County Sessions House.	
The Woods	2026	Netflix adaptation of the novel of the same name by Harlan Coben. Filming took place around Faulkner Street and Hope Street.	
A Woman of Substance	2026	Channel 4 dramatisation of the 1979 novel of the same name by Barbara Taylor Bradford. Liverpool doubled for New York during filming.	
World On Fire	2019	BBC WW2 drama starring Sean Bean and Helen Hunt. Filming took place in Ainsdale woods, involving a set being built for an army camp.	
Worried About The Boy	2010	BBC biopic of Boy George	
Young Dracula	2011–14	British children's horror drama comedy television series which aired on the BBC channel CBBC. Filming took place at Margaret Bevan School, Croxteth Hall and Stanley Docks.	
You are here	2026	BBC adaptation of the David Nicholls's book of the same name. Filming took place on Old Hall Street outside of Moorfields railway station.	
Z-Cars	1962–1978	Filmed on the outskirts of Liverpool in Kirkby	
