= German Church =

German Church may refer to:

- Protestant Church in Germany
- Catholic Church in Germany
- German Evangelical Church, the official Protestant church of the Third Reich
- German Church, Christchurch
- German Church, Gothenburg
- German Church, Indianapolis, Indiana, United States
- German Church, Liverpool
- German Church, Stockholm

== See also ==
- Trinity Church (Karlskrona), Karlskrona
