= Georgian Quarter, Liverpool =

Neighbourhood in Liverpool, England

Coordinates: 53.39813°N 2.96663°W

Georgian Quarter
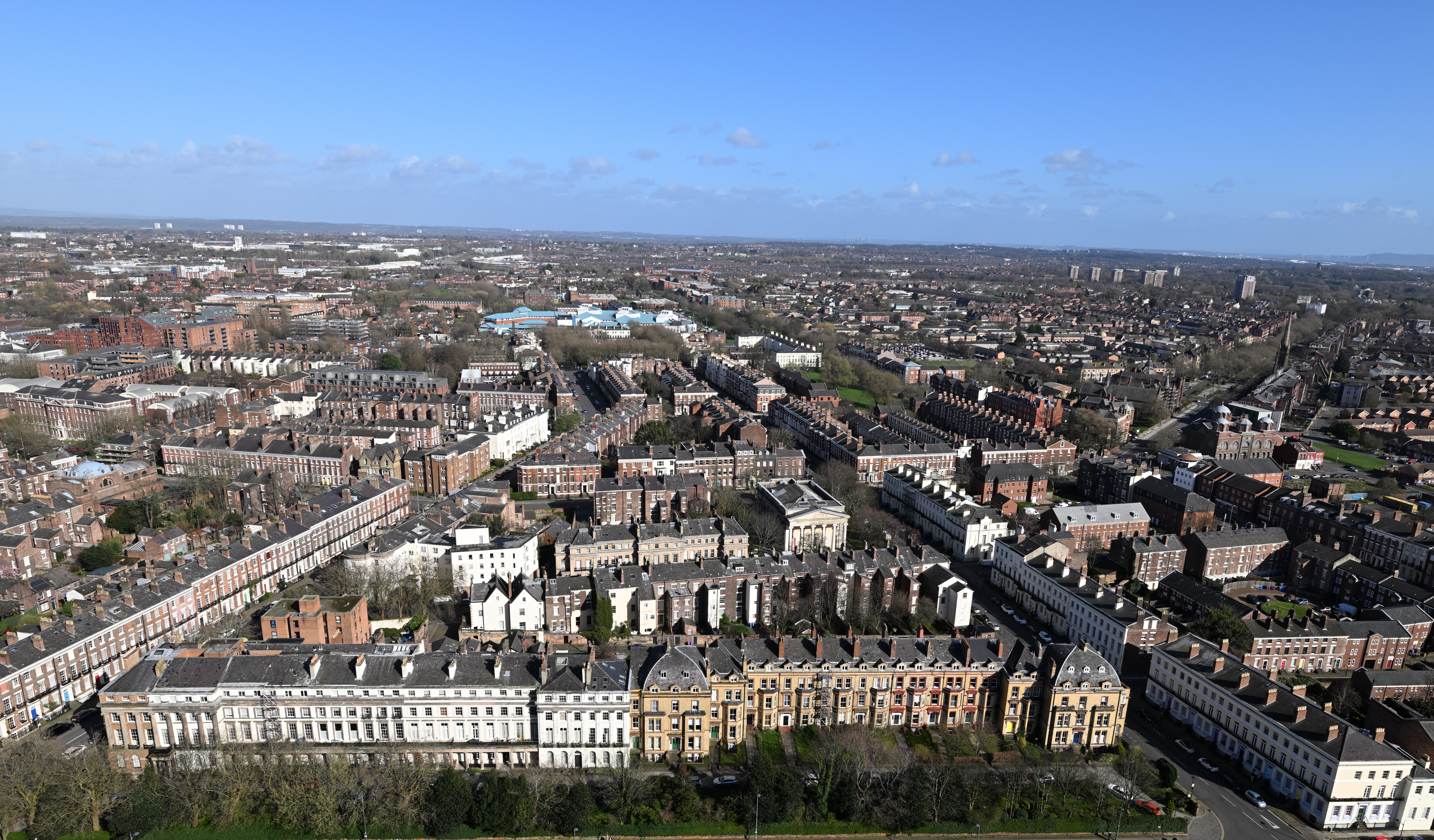
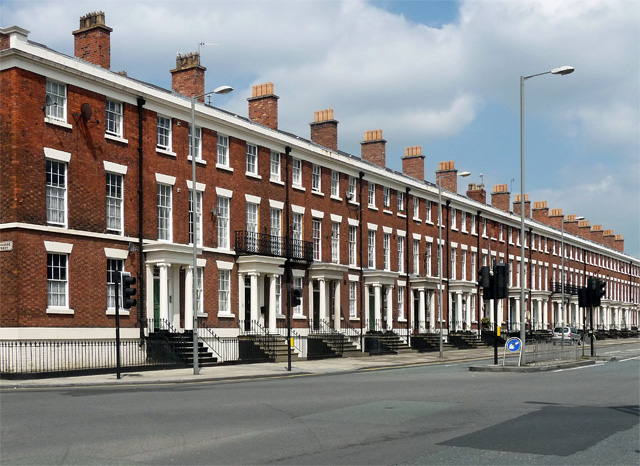
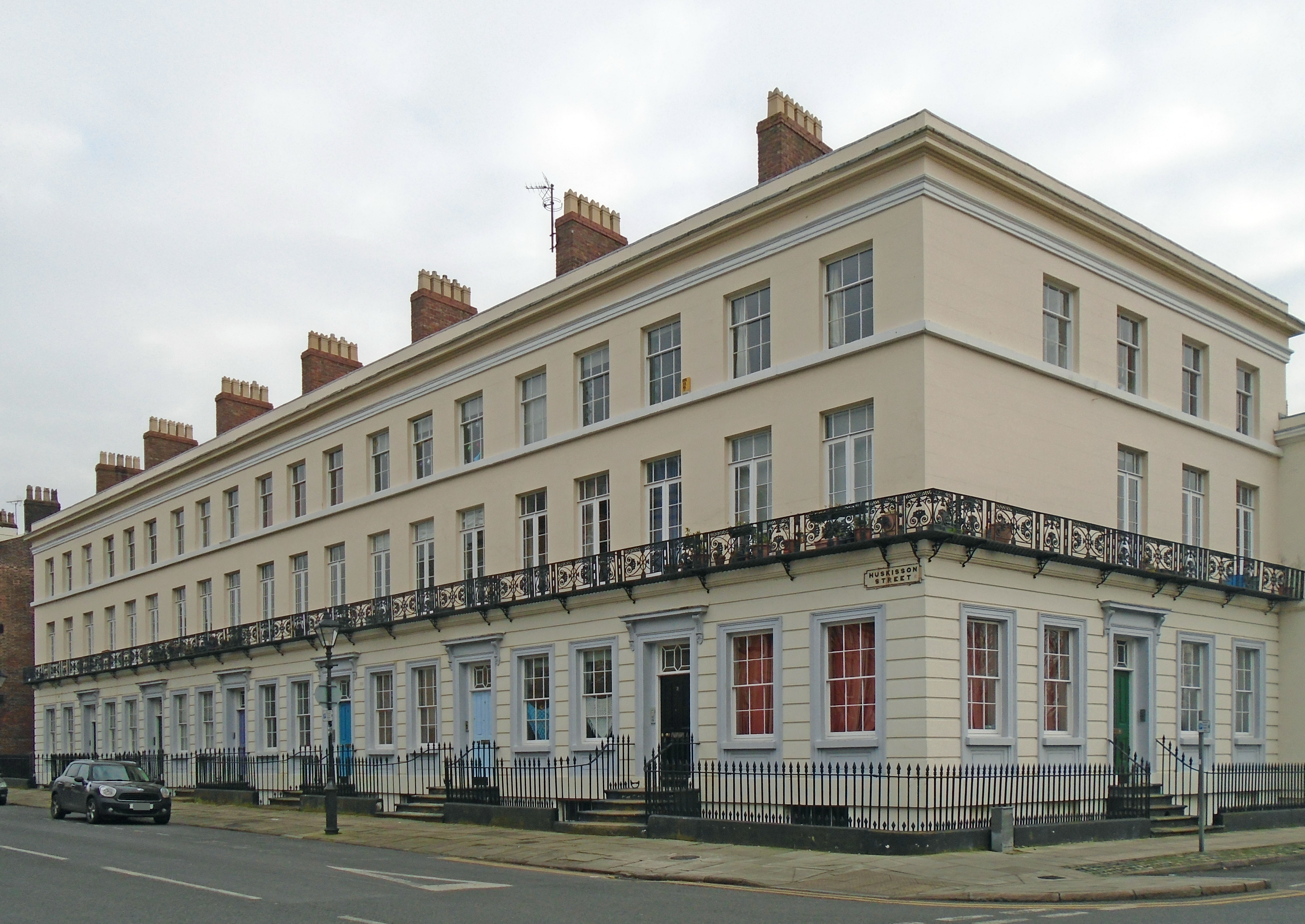
- Clockwise from top: Part of the Georgian Quarter from the top of the Anglican Cathedral tower; 79-109 Upper Parliament Street and 2-12 Huskisson Street

- Location within Merseyside
- OS grid reference: SJ3573489497
- Metropolitan borough: Liverpool
- Metropolitan county: Merseyside
- Region: North West
- Country: England
- Sovereign state: United Kingdom
- Post town: Liverpool
- Postcode district: L8, plus a small part of L1 and L7
- Dialling code: 0151
- Police: Merseyside
- Fire: Merseyside
- Ambulance: North West
- UK Parliament: Liverpool Riverside

The Georgian Quarter (sometimes known as Canning or the Canning Georgian Quarter) is an area on the eastern edge of Liverpool city centre, England, characterised by almost entirely residential Georgian architecture. Parts of the district are also included in Liverpool's Knowledge Quarter. It borders the rest of the Knowledge Quarter to the north, the district of Toxteth to the south, Edge Hill to the east and Ropewalks, Chinatown and the Baltic Triangle to the west. The name 'Canning' comes from one of its principal thoroughfares, Canning Street, which is named after George Canning, (1770–1827), a British politician who served as Foreign Secretary and, briefly, Prime Minister.

== History ==
In 1800, the Liverpool Corporation Surveyor, John Foster, Sr., (1758–1827) prepared a gridiron plan for a large area of peat bog known as Mosslake Fields, which was to the east of Rodney Street. The area was built for and populated by the extremely wealthy of Liverpool. With the city's decline in the 20th century, the area grew unfashionable, and much of it became derelict. Areas along Upper Parliament St and Grove St and Myrtle St were demolished. The tide began to turn noticeably in the 1990s and the area is now much sought after.

The area's changing fortunes over time were explored in the 2018 BBC Two documentary series A House Through Time, when historian David Olusoga researched the lives of the inhabitants of 62 Falkner Street from 1841 to the present day.

== Location ==
The area stretches from Gambier Terrace and Roscoe Street in the west to Falkner Street in the east, with Upper Parliament Street to the south and Mount Pleasant and Oxford Street to the north.

== See also ==
- Abercromby Square
- Dukes Terrace
- Gambier Terrace
- Falkner Square
- Liverpool Philharmonic Hall
- Liverpool Institute for Performing Arts
- German Church
- St Bride's Church
- St Andrew's Church
- Church of St Philip Neri
- Wellington Rooms
- Architecture of Liverpool

== Bibliography ==
- Buildings of Liverpool. Liverpool Heritage Bureau, 1978.
- Pevsner Architectural Guides — Liverpool. Joseph Sharples, 2004.
