= Peter Chang =

Peter Chang may refer to:

- Peter Chang (artist) (1944–2017), British jewelry artist
- Peter Chang (chef), Chinese chef specializing in Szechwan cuisine
- Peter I. Chang (born 1973), Taiwanese-born mixed-media artist, illustrator, and filmmaker
- Zhang Xueliang (Chang Hsueh-liang, 1901–2001), ruler of Manchuria and participant in the Xi'an Incident (Sian Incident)
