= Deborah Ryan =

Deborah Ryan may refer to:

- Deborah Sugg Ryan, British design historian
- Debby Ryan (born 1993), American actress and singer

== See also ==
- Debbie Ryan (born 1952), American basketball coach
