= Gambier Terrace =

Street in Liverpool, England

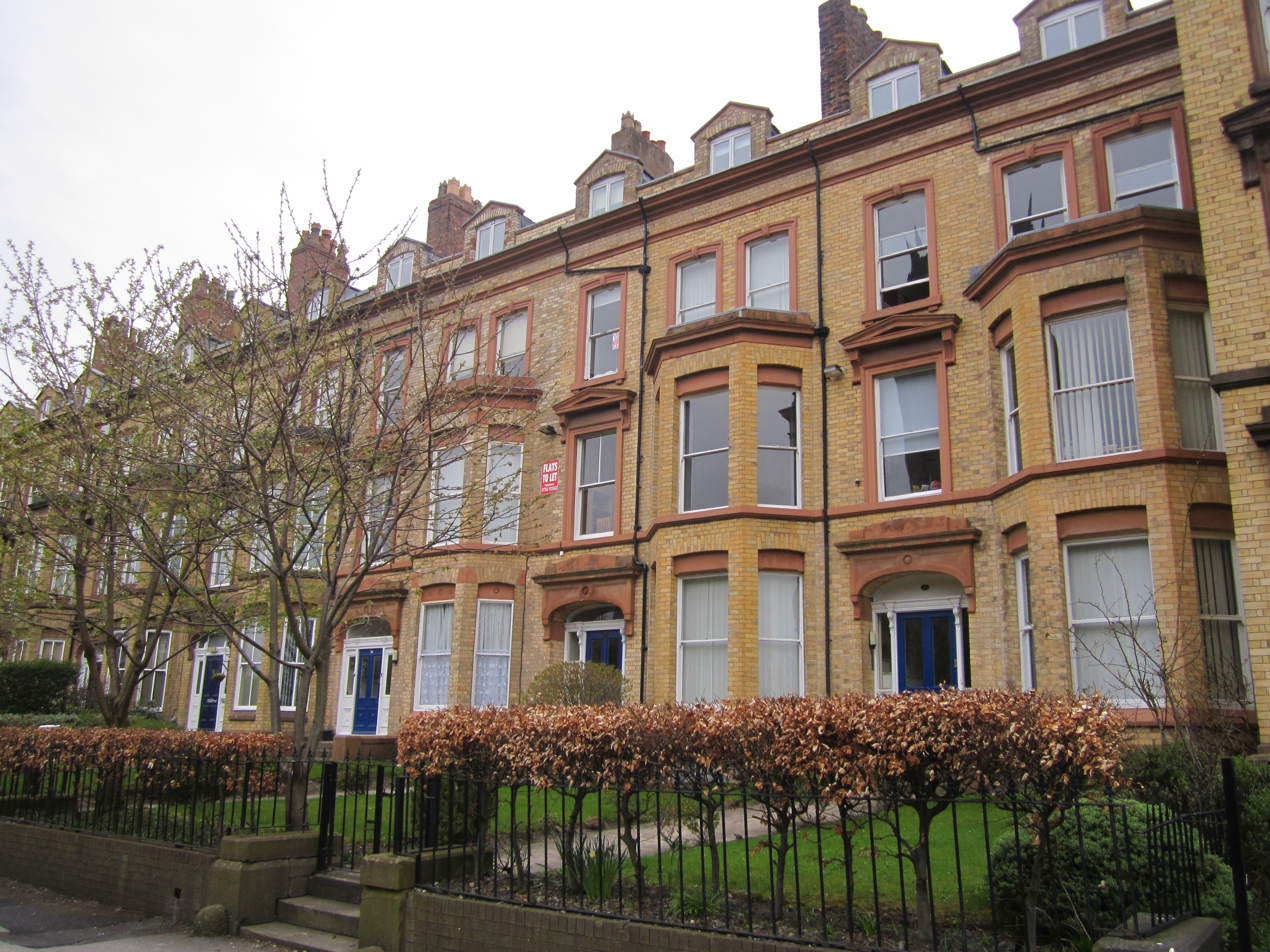
- View from the southern end
- Interactive map of the Gambier Terrace area

General information
- Location: Liverpool, England
- Coordinates: 53.398°N 2.971°W
- Construction started: 1832
- Completed: 1837

Design and construction
- Architect: John Foster
- Designations

Listed Building – Grade II*
- Official name: Nos. 1–10, Gambier Terrace and No. 2, Canning Street
- Designated: 28 June 1952
- Reference no.: 1068213

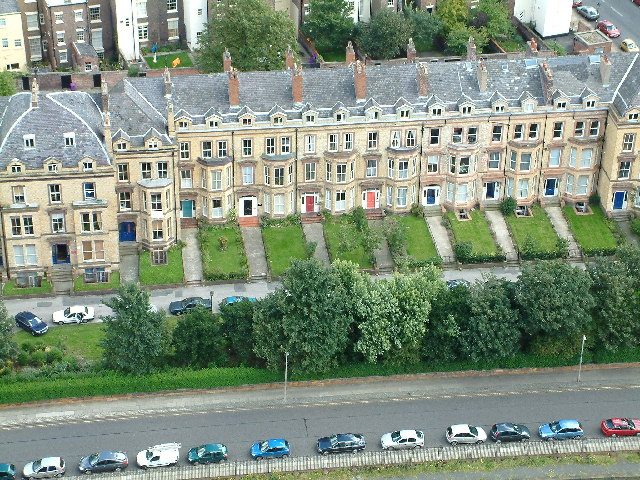
View from the Anglican Cathedral

Gambier Terrace is a street of 19th-century houses in Liverpool, England, overlooking St James's Mount and Gardens and the cathedral. It is generally reckoned to be in Canning, although it falls within the Rodney Street conservation area, together with Hope Street and Rodney Street.

It was named after James Gambier. Nos. 1 to 10 are Grade II* listed buildings, as is the northernmost house in the terrace, which has the address of Canning Street around the corner. They were probably designed by John Foster, Junior. The terrace was built in 1832–1837. It was originally planned that the entire row would be built in a single style but construction was halted in the slump of 1837, and the demand for large city houses declined as the middle class moved out to the new suburbs. No. 10 was the last of the original build. The terrace was later completed to a cheaper specification.

During the First World War, No. 1 Gambier Terrace was the location of the Women's War Service Bureau which assisted soldiers and their families. The service expanded into five additional premises on Bold Street and Berry Street.

In the 1950s and 1960s, Nos. 11–12 Gambier Terrace was home to the Liverpool Art High School, the junior section of the Liverpool College of Art. The students were aged 13–16 years of age who won scholarships to attend the school. Cynthia Lennon was a student there before she met John Lennon of The Beatles.

In the 1960s the terrace was in poor condition. John Lennon lived at No. 3 Gambier Terrace in 1960 with former Beatles bassist Stuart Sutcliffe after Sutcliffe asked the others who lived there, including fellow student and future well-known artist Margaret Chapman if the homeless Lennon could move in. They all attended the nearby Liverpool College of Art. The large number of students and artists living there led to a reporter from The Sunday People paying a visit for a story headlined "This is the Beatnik Horror", inadvertently including the first known published photograph of John Lennon.

Also a student there was Peter Chang, a British artist known for his distinctive jewellery. He later trained as a graphic designer and sculptor at the Liverpool College of Art. He won the Liverpool Senior City Scholarship in 1966 which enabled him to study in Paris at Atelier 17 under S.W. Hayter. From the 1980s onward, he focused on jewellery-making. His collection was featured in Rifat Ozbek's 1987 fashion show. His work is in collections around the world, including the Victoria and Albert Museum, the Metropolitan Museum of Art, and the Cooper Hewitt.

The freehold to the terrace and the garden in front belongs to Liverpool City Council. The land adjacent to Hope Street is maintained, in part, by the City Council and the leaseholders. The exact status of this land is unclear except that it is a public thoroughfare and unadopted by the City Council's highways department.

== See also ==
- Architecture of Liverpool
- Grade II* listed buildings in Liverpool – City Centre
