= Timothy Corsellis =

English poet

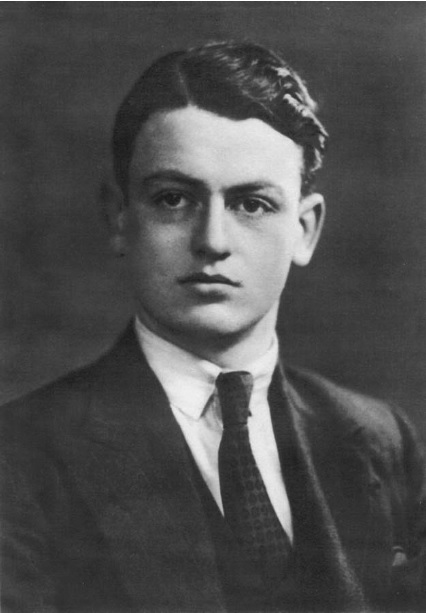
- Corsellis in 1938
- Born: Timothy John Manley Corsellis; 27 January 1921; Eltham, London, England
- Died: 10 October 1941 (aged 20); Annan, Dumfriesshire, Scotland
- Resting place: Oxford Crematorium
- Education: St. Clare Preparatory School, Walmer, Kent; Winchester College
- Occupation: Air raid warden then a pilot with Air Transport Auxiliary (Service Number 625)

Timothy Corsellis (27 January 1921 – 10 October 1941) was an English poet of World War II.

== Early life ==
Timothy John Manley Corsellis was born on 27 January 1921 in Eltham, London, the third of the four children of Helen (née Bendall) and Douglas Corsellis. His father had lost a fore-arm at Gallipoli, but went on to become a prosperous barrister and learnt to fly his own light aircraft. Timothy went to St. Clare preparatory school in Walmer, Kent, where John Magee, the author of "High Flight" was a contemporary and Henry Bentinck became a friend. After his father's death in an air crash in 1930, Timothy was sent to Winchester College, where he contributed poems to the school magazine and fenced.

Leaving school to start work as an articled clerk in the Town Clerk's office in Wandsworth, he divided his evenings between work as a resident volunteer at the Crown and Manor Club, a Winchester College Settlement in Hoxton, East London and entertainment in Fitzrovia, where he earned money for drinks by "conjuring", a talent which earned him the right of entry into the exclusive Magic Circle.

== Wartime experience ==
Strongly marked by the failure of the Munich Agreement, Corsellis registered in April 1939 as a conscientious objector on religious grounds. When war broke out he became an ARP warden. After Dunkirk, he volunteered for training as a fighter pilot. His initial training in Torquay and Carlisle did not prepare him for his assignment to Bomber Command, an assignment which in January 1941 he refused, on the grounds that his conscience would not permit him to take part in the indiscriminate bombing of civilians. His request to join Fighter Command was met with an honourable discharge from the RAF and his application to join the Fleet Air Arm was ignored, but he was accepted by the Air Transport Auxiliary, which ferried aircraft from factory to operational squadrons. From January to July 1941, at the height of the Blitz, he worked as a full-time ARP warden, and then he began his ATA training at White Waltham in August 1941. On 10 October 1941, the aircraft Corsellis was flying stalled and crashed over Annan in Dumfriesshire, Scotland. He was 20 years old.

== Literary life ==
At the time of his death Corsellis was just beginning to break into London literary circles, and in death he was not forgotten. Keidrych Rhys and Patricia Ledward wrote elegies for him, and included some of his poems in their anthologies, Poems from the Forces,' More Poems from the Forces and Poems of This War by Younger Poets. As John Sutherland recounts, Stephen Spender, for whom Corsellis had found war work in Wandsworth, was haunted by his sudden disappearance, and his penultimate poem, dated 1941/1995 was dedicated to "Timothy Corsellis". The American anthologist Oscar Williams championed his work, and an American poet and former war pilot, Simon Perchik, has paid him tribute. In 2004 the Oxford Dictionary of National Biography took a first step in establishing a literary canon of World War 2 poets by including nine: Keith Douglas, Sidney Keyes, Alun Lewis, Gavin Ewart, Roy Fuller, John Pudney, Henry Reed, Frank Thompson and Corsellis. Ronald Blythe wrote a moving account of his life for the Oxford Dictionary of National Biography, while critics as well known as Andrew Sinclair and D.S.R. Welland have singled out his work.

In 2012, Helen Goethals's The Unassuming Sky: The Life and Poetry of Timothy Corsellis made available for the first time a hundred of his poems, arranged to bring out their "unique literary and historical interest". Two reviews put them into context: those of Martyn Halsall in the Church Times – "This study assists the debate on war poetry from 1939 to 1945" – and Ralph Townsend in The Trusty Servant – "The place of Corsellis among the Second War poets of England is established in the anthologies. Here additional poems ... which have not before gone into print present him as an example of a young man whose education led him to take an independent moral view of things ...".

In 2014, the introduction to a War Words poetry reading by Andrew Eaton stated that "The First and Second World Wars inspired gifted writers from Wilfred Owen to Timothy Corsellis to commit to paper their personal wartime narratives. These texts, often graphic and harrowing, have gone on to become parts of the world's cultural fabric.".

== Legacy ==
Also in 2014 the Poetry Society, supported by the War Poets Association and the Imperial War Museums, launched its Timothy Corsellis Prize Competition for a poem responding to the Second World War. This was directed at young poets all over the world aged 14–25, and was for a poem responding to the life and/or work of Keith Douglas, Sidney Keyes, Alun Lewis, John Jarmain, Henry Reed or Timothy, with a short comment (300 words) explaining how the competitor responded to one or more of them. The competition was to be repeated annually for at least 5 years.

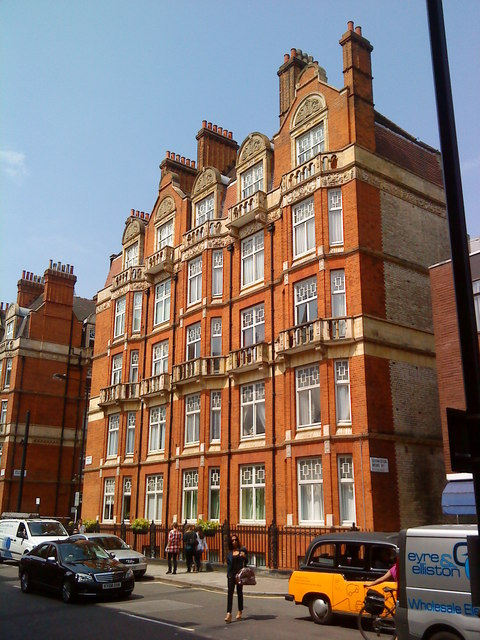
Montagu Mansions, Marylebone

Corsellis was one of a number of residents of Montagu Mansions, in the Marylebone district of London, featured in the fifth series of the BBC Television history series, A House Through Time.

The site of his air crash is marked with a commemorative stone.

== Excerpts from poems ==
When I was a civilian I hoped high
Dreamt my future cartwheels in the sky
Almost forgot to arm myself
Against the boredom and the inefficiency
The petty injustice and the everlasting grudges
The sacrifice is greater than I ever expected.

— from "What I never saw" (January 24, 1941)

Under this pile of fallen masonry
Under those spillikins of beams
Where number thirty two lies shattered
There may be a body
Dig
For there may be a body.

Distorted corpse once breathed slum air
Lived in the grey dust where it died;
Is it for this that bending we strived
And fought in other's blood and other's sorrow
To reach these wretched mangled remains?
Is it for this that we ached in the darkness
Not knowing that nearby
Another house had fallen
To the blast of that same bomb.

Sweat fell, we were not the strong and young
They were out training, preparing,
We are the best of those remaining
We are the mellow and the hardened
And though our backs are hard of bending
Under aloofness our souls bend rending
The sorrow out of the bereaved father's breast
Tearing it out and holding it in our own hands
Adopting it to our own bodies
Caring for the children we had never seen

Sometimes we pray to be hardened and callous
But God turns a deaf ear
And we know hate and sorrow,
Intimately
And we do not mind dying tomorrow.

— from "Dawn after the raid" (April 20, 1941)

I will not sing the song of others
In other people's words;
I will not see the world of others
Through other people's eyes.
But blue, far into space,
I'll hurl my judgment of the human race
Upwards to the unassuming sky,
Farther than any bird can fly.

— from "It is not you, pale lonely star" (August 22, 1941)

And for the gifts that you can proffer
Hope and love and power and pride
Take from me all I can offer
Weakness and some words beside.

— from "The gifts" (August 28, 1941)

== Bibliography ==
- Keidrych Rhys (ed.), Poems from the Forces, Routledge, 1941
- – More Poems from the Forces, Routledge, 1943
- Patricia Ledward & Colin Strang (ed.), Poems of this War by Younger Poets, Cambridge University Press, 1942
- Robert Herring (ed.), Life and Letters Today, 1942
- John Pudney & Henry Treece (ed.), Air Force Poetry, Bodley Head, 1944
- Oscar Williams (ed.),War Poet's, New York, John Day Company, 1945
- Oscar Williams (ed.), A Little Treasury of Modern Poetry, New York, Scribner & Sons, 1946
- Oscar Williams (ed.), A Little Treasury of Modern Poetry, Routledge, 1947
- Stephen Spender, World Within World, Harcourt, Brace, 1951.
- Ronald Blythe (ed.), Components of the Scene: An Anthology of Stories, Poems and Essays from the Second World War, Penguin Books, 1966
- Brian Gardner (ed.), The Terrible Rain: The War Poets 1939–1945, Methuen, 1966.
- Charles Hamblett (ed.), I Burn for England: An Anthology of the Poetry of World War II, Frewin, 1966
- Andrew Sinclair (ed.), The War Decade: An Anthology of the 1940s, Hamish Hamilton, 1989
- – War like a Wasp: The Lost Decade of the 1940s, Hamish Hamilton, 1989
- Victor Selwyn (ed.), Poems of the Second World War, Dent, Everyman's Library, 1985
- – The Voice of War, Michael Joseph, 1995
- Paul Fussell, Wartime: Understanding and Behavior in the Second World War, Oxford University Press, 1989
- Gordon Mursell, English Spirituality: From 1700 to the Present Day, John Knox Press, 2001
- Martin Barraclough (ed.), Give Me the Wings: A Celebration of English Aviation Poetry, Words by Design, 2012
- Helen Goethals, The Unassuming Sky: The Life and Poetry of Timothy Corsellis, Cambridge Scholars Publishing, 2012.
