= Black Merchant Seamen War Memorial =

World War II memorial in Liverpool, UK

Black Merchant Seaman – WW2
- United Kingdom
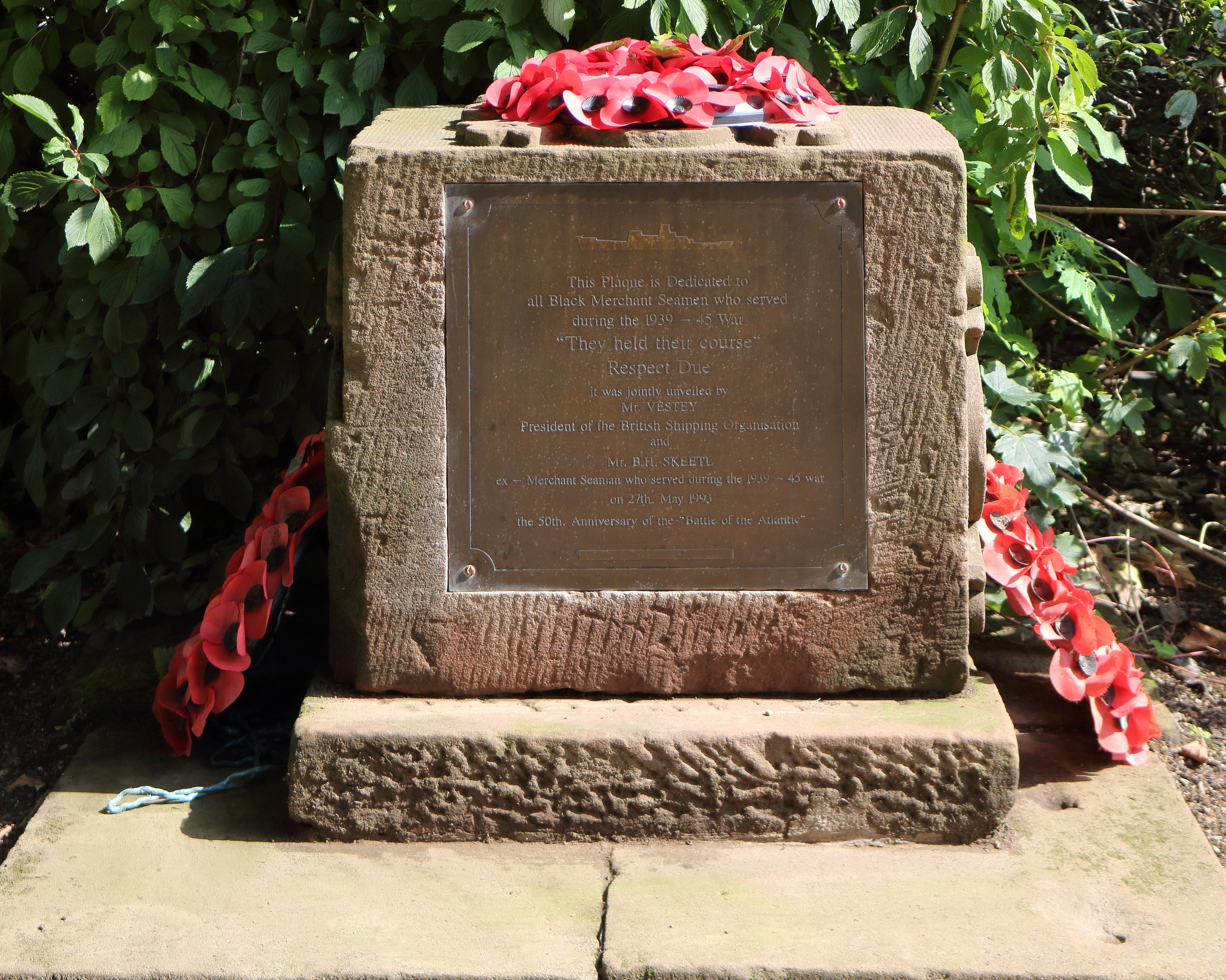
- The memorial, decked with poppies
- For All Black Merchant Seamen who served during World War II
- Unveiled: 27 May 1993
- Location: 53.3982°N 2.9629°W; Liverpool, Merseyside

The Black Merchant Seamen War Memorial is a sandstone stone memorial, It is situated in Falkner Square, Liverpool. The stone is from the Liverpool Seamen's Hostel with a bronze plaque dedicated to all the Black Seamen who served during World War II. It was unveiled in 1993 on the 50th anniversary of the Battle of the Atlantic.

== History ==
The memorial was installed in Falkner Square Gardens in 1993, following a campaign organised by community activist Joe Farrag, whose Egyptian grandfather, Ali Hussain Farrag, served as a merchant seaman during World War II. He went down with his ship, along with 36 other crew members, on 12 May 1943.

Over the years since the memorial was installed, the plaque was defaced and pulled from the stone, it was returned by the local gardener. The War Memorials Trust gave a grant to remove the graffiti by steam cleaning.

After several years of the plants around the memorial being overgrown by branches, a Facebook group was set up by local residents to raise awareness of it and have visitor and road signs installed locally. A celebration was held in August 2019 to mark the installation of the signs and increase awareness of the memorial.

== Description ==
The memorial consists of a freestanding red sandstone stone from the (now demolished) Liverpool Seamen's Hostel which bears an embossed plaque. On top of the plaque is the outline of a ship, "Fort Concord", which was sunk by German U-boat U-456 on 12 May 1943.

The inscription on the plaque reads as follows:

THIS PLAQUE IS DEDICATED TO
ALL BLACK MERCHANT SEAMEN WHO SERVED
DURING THE 1939 – 45 WAR
"THEY HELD THEIR COURSE"
RESPECT DUE
IT WAS JOINTLY UNVEILED BY
MR. VESTY
PRESIDENT OF THE BRITISH SHIPPING ORGANISATION
AND
MR. B.H. SKEETE
EX-MERCHANT SEAMAN WHO SERVED DURING THE 1939 – 45 WAR
ON 27TH MAY 1993
THE 50TH ANNIVERSARY OF THE "BATTLE OF THE ATLANTIC"
COMMISSIONED BY THE GALLERY & LIVERPOOL CITY COUNCIL
