= Paul Dittel =

SS officer (born 1907)

- Born: 14 January 1907
- Died: 1982 (aged 74–75)
- Education: doctorate
- Occupation: Historian
- Political party: Nazi Party

Paul Dittel (14 January 1907 in Mittweida, Saxony – 8 May 1982 in Mönchengladbach) was a German historian and Anglicist who was also an Obersturmbannführer in the Schutzstaffel (SS). He played a central role in the Nazi German policy of confiscating libraries and literary collections from occupied countries.

== Biography ==
Within the SS, Dittel was affiliated with the Sicherheitsdienst (SD) intelligence service and he was chief of that body's museum, library and research department. In late 1939 he was one of a number of Ahnenerbe members selected by Wolfram Sievers to travel to Poland in order to raid its museums and collections.

In 1943, Dittel succeeded Franz Six as chief of the Reich Security Main Office (SS-Reichssicherheitshauptamt; RSHA) department, Amt VII, the "written records" section which had responsibility for ideological research. In this role his activities soon came to focus on the topic of Freemasonry and he was involved in the looting of collections, devoted to this topic. Dittel oversaw the publication of a number of anti-Masonic books from the collection of material that he had gathered as well as the establishment of a Masonic Library. He was also responsible for the development of a special collection of books on occult topics such as theosophy and astrology, a project that had been devised by Ernst Kaltenbrunner and in which SS chief Heinrich Himmler took a keen interest.

Dittel was imprisoned after World War II. Following his release in 1948, he moved to Mönchengladbach where he was employed as a clerk until at least 1973.

== Legacy ==
Dittel was one of a number of residents of 72, Pfalzburger Strasse in Wilmersdorf, Berlin—where his neighbours included a Jewish family and a man from Togo— featured in the fifth series of the BBC Television history series, A House Through Time.
