= Falkner Street =

Street in Liverpool, England

Falkner Street, Liverpool
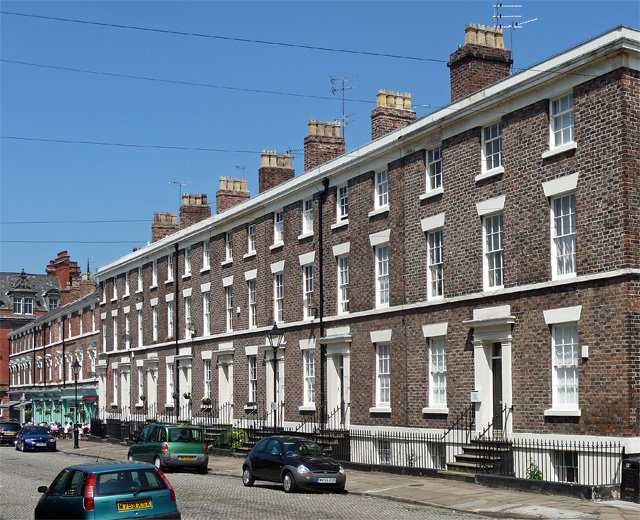
- Falkner Street, Liverpool

- Location within Liverpool
- Location: Canning, Liverpool city centre
- Postal code: L8
- Coordinates: 53.3994°N 2.9630°W

Other
- Known for: Residential Georgian architecture

Falkner Street is a street mostly in Canning, with a short section in Edge Hill, Liverpool, England. The street, built during the early-mid 19th century, is named after Edward Falkner, who had previously commissioned the construction Falkner Square. Constructed at a time when Liverpool had less than 100,000 houses, the Falkner Street houses sold for around £1,000 (equivalent to £123556 in 2024) and were affordable to only the wealthiest 1% of the population.

== Topography ==
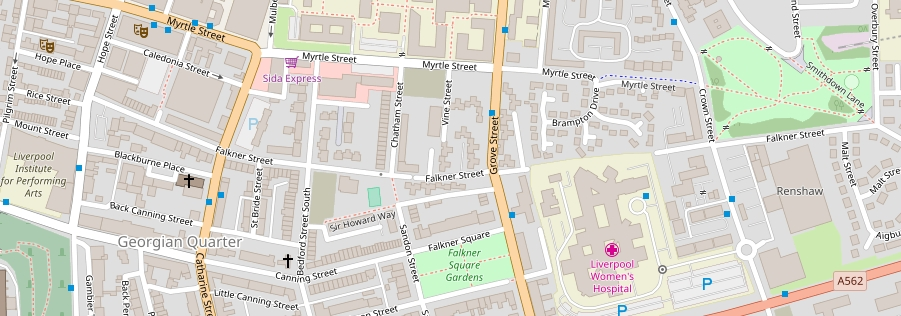
Map of Falkner Street

Falkner Street runs from Hope Street in the west to Grove Street in the east, where it is broken by the Liverpool Women's Hospital. Only short sections remain between that point and Crown Street, when its course resumes until reaching the junction of Smithdown Lane and Overbury Street. Along this latter stretch it forms the southern boundary of Crown Street Park, the site of Liverpool's first railway station.

== History ==
Prior to being fully developed, the street was originally known as Crabtree Lane.

== Redevelopment ==
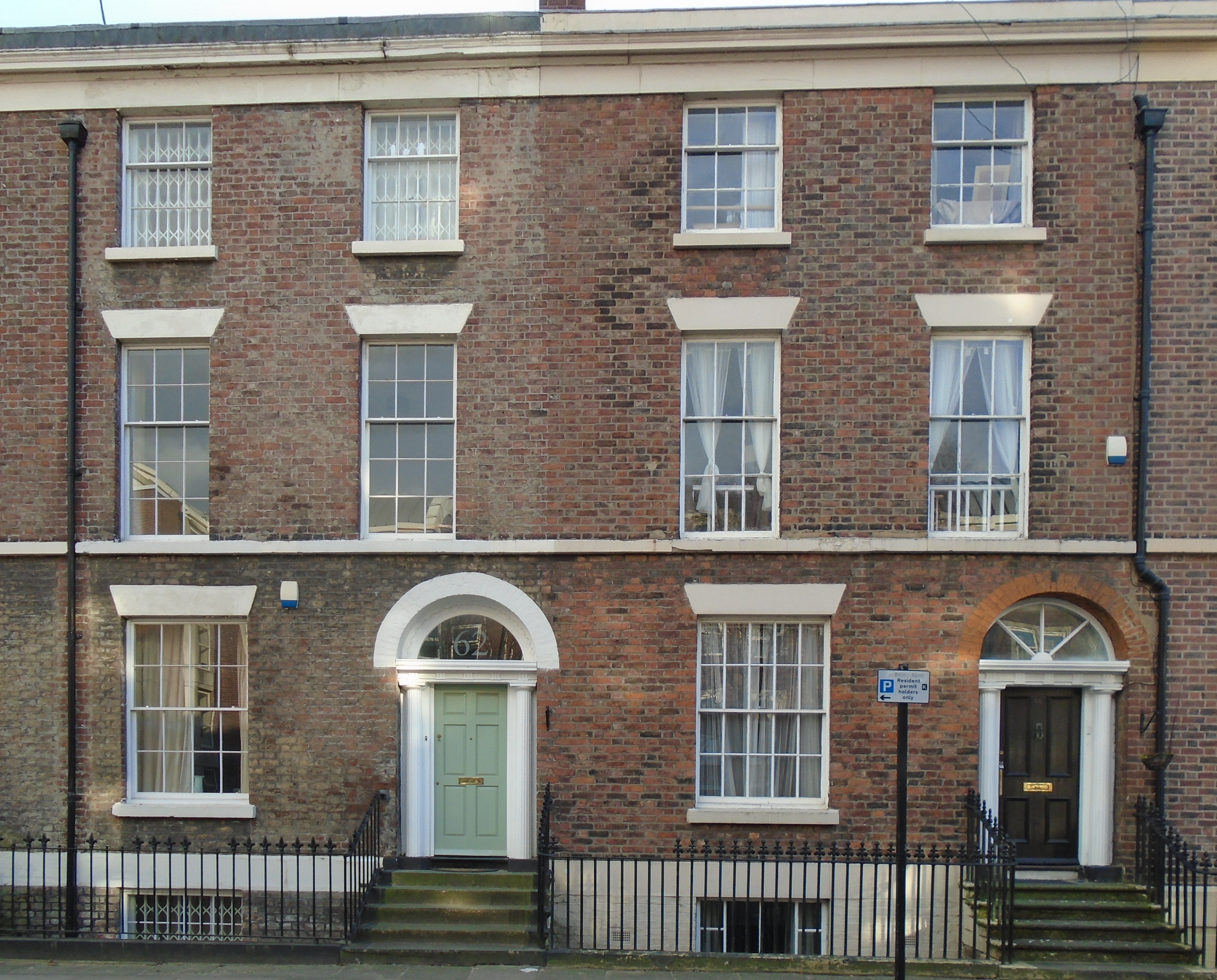
60 & 62 Falkner Street, 2017

The area around Falkner Street was significant redeveloped during the 1960s and 1970s. The Liverpool Echo reported in 1960 that some of the worst blocks of housing in the area where around Falkner Street. New build redevelopment around the area was announced in 1969, with the aim being to build new accommodation to "embody in the plan many of the existing buildings" in an attempt to make new builds "blend in" with existing properties. The scheme, designed by architects from Kingham Knight Associates, intended to provide 1,640 homes in the area around Falkner Street, including 400 provided in the Falkner Street phase itself. Following years of demolition and rebuild, emphasis in the mid-1970s "shifted violently away from clearing to improving", with many homes in Falkner Street instead listed as being of "architectural interest" and renovated instead of being bulldozed.

As well as new housing, redevelopment plans also included recreational facilities and in 1976, a new public park was created at the former Crown Street railway yard at land in Falkner Street. However, a children's playground that had been set up in Falkner Street with £8,000 from urban aid funds was in a vandalised and disused state by the 1980s, then being used as a rubbish tip.

== Notability ==
Notable residents have included Brian Epstein, manager of the Beatles pop group, who owned the ground floor flat at No 36 and let John Lennon and then wife Cynthia Lennon use it during the first few months of their marriage and through her pregnancy in 1962 and 1963.

62 Falkner Street is a Grade II listed house, which was the subject of a 2018 four-part documentary on BBC Television, A House Through Time. It forms a pair of houses with no 60, which were built in the 1820s according to Historic England, or 1840 according to research for the BBC.
