= Anson Dyer =

British film director and screenwriter (1876–1962)

- Born: Ernest J. Anson Dyer; 18 July 1876; Brighton, United Kingdom
- Died: 22 February 1962 (aged 86); Cheltenham, United Kingdom
- Occupation: Animator

Anson Dyer, born Ernest J. Anson Dyer (Brighton, 18 July 1876 – Cheltenham, 22 February 1962), was an English director, screenwriter, animator, and actor. His company Stratford Abbey Films, based in Stroud, was the only Technicolor production unit and three-colour camera in the whole of Western Europe in the 1940s.

== Filmography ==
The following filmography, based on the Internet Movie Database, is incomplete.

=== Director ===
- Peter's Picture Poems (1917)
- Old King Koal (1917)
- Three Little Pigs (1918)
- Oh'phelia or Oh'phelia a Cartoon Burlesque (1919)
- Romeo and Juliet (1919)
- The Merchant of Venice (1919)
- 'Amlet (1919)
- Othello (1920)
- Dollars in Surrey, co-directed by George Dewhurst (1921)
- Little Red Riding Hood (1922)
- A Day in Liverpool (1929)
- The Story of the Port of London (1932)
- Drummed Out
- Sam and His Musket
- Beat the Retreat
- Carmen (1936)
- Sam's Medal
- Halt, Who Goes There?
- The Lion and Albert
- Three Ha'pence a Foot
- Gunner Sam
- As Old as the Hills
- Fowl Play (1950)

=== Writer ===
- Peter's Picture Poems, directed by Anson Dyer (1917)
- Old King Koal, directed by Anson Dyer (1917)
- Oh'phelia or Oh'phelia a Cartoon Burlesque, directed by Anson Dyer (1919)
- Romeo and Juliet, directed by Anson Dyer (1919)
- The Merchant of Venice, directed by Anson Dyer (1919)
- 'Amlet, directed by Anson Dyer (1919)
- Othello, directed by Anson Dyer (1920)
- The Story of the Port of London, directed by Anson Dyer (1932)
- Flood Tide, directed by John Baxter (1934)
- Carmen, directed by Anson Dyer (1936)
- The Vicar of Bray, directed by Henry Edwards (1937)
- The Second Mate, directed by John Baxter (1950)

=== Animator ===
- The Story of the Port of London, directed by Anson Dyer (1932)
- Peter's Picture Poems, directed by Anson Dyer (1917)
- Old King Koal, directed by Anson Dyer (1917)
- Oh'phelia or Oh'phelia a Cartoon Burlesque, directed by Anson Dyer (1919)
- Romeo and Juliet, directed by Anson Dyer (1919)
- The Merchant of Venice, directed by Anson Dyer (1919)
- 'Amlet, directed by Anson Dyer (1919)
- Othello, directed by Anson Dyer (1920)

=== Animation Shorts (Gaumont-British News) ===
- The British Lion Awakes, directed by Anson Dyer (1939)
- Hitler On His Front Line, directed by Anson Dyer (1939)
- Hitler's Peace Pudding, directed by Anson Dyer (1939)
- Hitler Dances To Stalin's Tune, directed by Anson Dyer (1939)
- Run, Adolf, Run, directed by Anson Dyer (1940)

=== Director of photography ===
- Peter's Picture Poems, directed by Anson Dyer (1917)

=== Actor ===
- Old King Koal, directed by Anson Dyer (1917)
