= Eleanor Scoones =

English television producer and director

- Born: Eleanor Jane Scoones; 20 January 1981; Stepney, East London, England
- Died: 2 July 2023 (aged 42)
- Occupations: Television producer and director
- Spouse: Xavier
- Children: 2

Eleanor Jane Scoones (20 January 1981 – 2 July 2023) was an English television producer and director. A history graduate of Trinity College, Cambridge, she worked on programmes presented by the historian Lucy Worsley and others broadcast on multiple British television channels such as BBC One, BBC Two, BBC Four, Channel 4 and Channel 5.

== Biography ==
Scoones was born on 20 January 1981, in Stepney, East London. She was the daughter of the English language teacher to foreign students Philip Anthony Francis Scoones and the National Trust worker Jane Francesca (née Barran). Scoones moved to Hammersmith when she was four and was educated at St Paul's Girls' School in London. She excelled in history, having become interested in the subject by a history teacher. Scoones studied history at Trinity College, Cambridge.

Following graduation, she got a job at Silver River, a production company. Scoones was an assistant producer and worked on a BBC documentary on The Blitz in 2008. In 2011, she made the first collaboration with the historian Lucy Worsley when she was the assistant producer of the series If These Walls Could Talk broadcast on BBC Four in 2011. The following year, Scoones again worked with Worsley on the three-part series Harlots, Housewives and Heroines: 17th Century History for Girls on women of Stuart Restoration period following the end of the Commonwealth of England run by Oliver Cromwell. The series was the first one she directed, something she aspired to be. Scoones directed the series Fit to Rule? How Royal Illness Changed History broadcast on BBC Two in 2013, scrutinising the biological and psychological strengths and weaknesses of rulers from Henry VIII to Edward VIII. She was the writer and director of the two-part 2014 BBC Two series Russia's Lost Princesses on the four daughters of Tsar Nicholas II who were murdered by the Bolsheviks. Scoones went on to direct the BBC Two documentary The Ascent of Woman by the historian Amanda Foreman, discovering stories on history-making women from 10,000 BC to the present.

She was the director of episodes of the BBC One genealogy documentary series Who Do You Think You Are? from 2016 to 2020. The episodes included the comedian Greg Davies, the singer Lulu, the actress Naomie Harris, the actress Jodie Whittaker and the comedian Jack Whitehall with his father. Scoones also worked for Twenty Twenty Television, Wall to Wall Media and Viacom International Studios, and other programmes she worked on include Our Victorian Christmas broadcast on Channel 5, A House Through Time for BBC Two, Lucy Worsley's Royal Palace Secrets for BBC Four, The Supersizers..., Sex Story: Fifty Shades of Grey for Channel 4, and both Dancing Cheek to Cheek: An Intimate History of Dance and Dan Cruickshank: At Home With The British for BBC Four.

== Personal life ==
Scoones was married to the finance worker Xavier and had two children with him. She died of ovarian cancer on 2 June 2023.
