= Peter Chang (artist) =

British and Chinese jewellery designer (1944–2017)

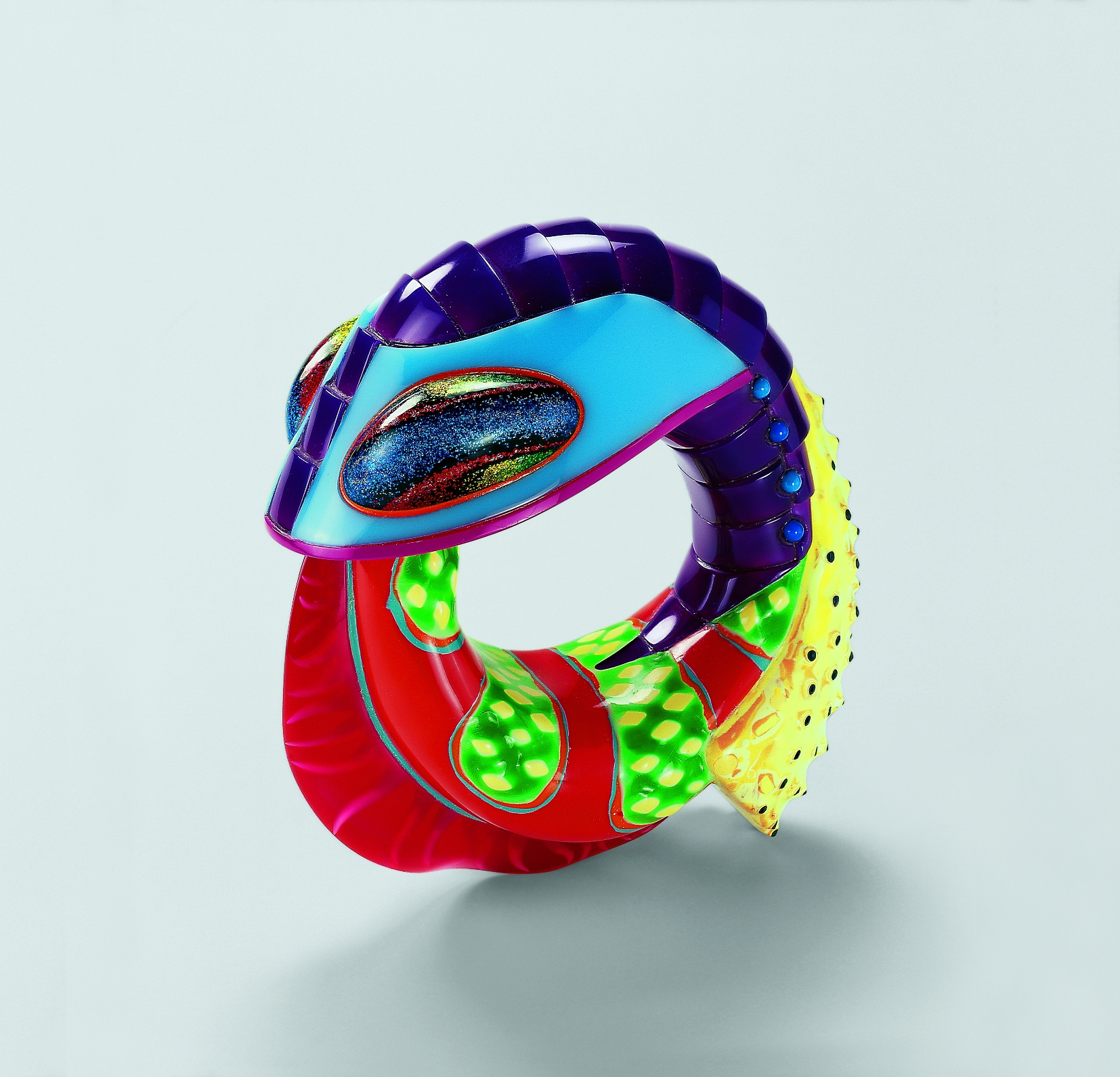
Peter Chang, Bangle, 1998, Pforzheim Jewelry Museum

Peter Chang (1944–2017) was a British and Chinese artist known for his distinctive jewelry. He trained as a graphic designer and sculptor at Liverpool College of Art. He won the Liverpool Senior City Scholarship in 1966, which enabled him to study in Paris at Atelier 17 under S. W. Hayter. From the 1980s onward he focused on jewellery-making. His collection was featured in Rifat Ozbek's 1987 fashion show. His work is in collections around the world, including the Victoria and Albert Museum, the National Museum of Scotland, the Metropolitan Museum of Art, Schmuckmuseum Pforzheim, German Goldsmith's House and the Cooper Hewitt.

== Recognition ==
- 1989: Scottish Gold Award
- 1995: Jerwood Prize for the Applied Arts
