= Deborah Sugg Ryan =

British design historian

- Occupations: Design Historian, Professor of Design History and Theory
- Known for: On-screen expert for BBC2's A House Through Time

Academic work
- Discipline: Design History
- Sub-discipline: Design Theory
- Institutions: University of Portsmouth, Falmouth University

Deborah Sugg Ryan is a British design historian, Professor of Design History and Theory and Associate Dean (Research) at the University of Portsmouth.

Sugg Ryan was previously Associate Professor of History and Theory of Design at Falmouth University.

She was series consultant and on-screen expert for the BBC2 television series A House Through Time.

== Selected publications ==
=== Books ===
- The Ideal Home Through the Twentieth Century (1997, revised edition 2014)
- Ideal Homes 1918-39: Domestic design and suburban modernism (Manchester University Press, 2018)
