= A Day in Liverpool =

- Directed by: Anson Dyer
- Screenplay by: Matthew Anderson
- Produced by: The Liverpool Organisation
- Production company: The Liverpool Organisation
- Release date: 1929
- Running time: 33 minutes
- Country: United Kingdom
- Language: English

A Day in Liverpool is a 1929 British city symphony film directed by Anson Dyer. It was produced by The Liverpool Organisation and promoted by the Liverpool Council. It takes place during an era of industrial prosperity for England. The setting is Liverpool and the surrounding area of Birkenhead, Lancashire, and Cheshire in northern England. It is noteworthy for being one of the United Kingdom's only city symphony films, although its status as one is up for debate among film scholars. It is most likely the first film production centred around the city of Liverpool.

== Synopsis ==
The film focuses on an average day for a commuting worker in Liverpool. It depicts ships entering Royal Albert Dock carrying people who will be working that day. The work day is mirrored by the repeated images of clocks, showing the passage of time. The film also serves to champion the technological and industrial advances that Liverpool has made, such as the Gladstone Docks, the largest in the world. It also highlights the future of the city in the construction of the Liverpool Cathedral.

While its main focus is the city, the film also highlights the people of Liverpool. Men, women, and children walk the streets and swim in Liverpool Bay. A toy vendor is one of several shopkeepers and salesmen that Dyer highlights.

There are several images of text that appear on the screen and serve to identify buildings, explain the workers' duties, and even provide a brief narrative at the end of the film between a young man and woman on a ship.

== Modern references ==
Footage from A Day in Liverpool can be found in later productions, including Of Time and the City.
