= German Church, Indianapolis =

Historic church building in Cumberland, Indiana

Coordinates: 39°46′34″N 85°58′16″W

The German Church (Note: Originally named the Deutsche Evangelische St Johannes Kirche (transl. St. John German Evangelical Church), the church has, due to denomination merges, also been named St. John Evangelical and Reformed Church and St. John United Church of Christ.) is a historic church building in Cumberland, Indiana, on the east side of Indianapolis. It is located on the northeastern corner of the intersection of Washington Street and German Church Road; it gives the latter its name. Sometimes described as a gateway to Cumberland, the building was the subject of a controversy regarding its preservation in the early 21st century.

== Building ==
The current German Church building is the site's third. Completed in 1914 for $30,000, the building is an example of the Tudor Gothic Revival style and featured stained glass windows described by the Indianapolis Historic Preservation Commission as "extraordinary." Later additions to the church include a Kilgen pipe organ in 1936 and a Sunday school wing in 1958. It is sometimes described as a gateway to the community.

== Preservation controversy ==
By 2009, St. John United Church of Christ and its shrinking, elderly congregation were unable to afford the costs of maintaining and repairing the building, which were estimated at $1.3 million over the following ten years. They hoped to sell the property and use the funds to construct a new building on a fifty-acre lot donated in the 1970s. The new building would preserve features from the German Church, such as its bell and windows, and include amenities intended to attract younger members.

In 2009, they agreed to sell it to Gershman Brown Crowley, a developer representing CVS Pharmacy. The Historic Landmarks Foundation of Indiana submitted an emergency request to the Indianapolis Historic Preservation Commission (IHPC) to designate the church a landmark, which it did. In response, St. John filed a federal lawsuit, alleging the IHPC had violated its right to freely exercise its religion; a lawyer representing the church explained that it was impossible for the congregation to preserve the building with its financial resources and that the designation condemned both the building and the congregation to ruin. In 2011, the parties reached a settlement whereby St. John UCC agreed to cooperate with Indiana Landmarks to find a buyer, and the IHPC agreed to begin lifting the historic designation if a suitable buyer was not found within six months.

In 2015, St. John UCC agreed to sell the German Church building to Giant Eagle, who planned to demolish the building and construct a GetGo gas station there. In response, the town of Cumberland created a "Save German Church" Facebook page, which received more than 4,000 likes; it also began exploring the possibility of buying the property itself. A Marion County zoning examiner recommended approval of Giant Eagle's rezoning request at a hearing on February 12; the town of Cumberland, which wanted a buyer that would preserve the building, had sought a more restrictive zoning classification that would have prohibited the property's use as a gas station. (Note: Cumberland straddles the border of Marion and Hancock Counties. The German Church is within Marion County, and due to Cumberland's inclusion in Unigov, the consolidated city-county government has full authority over zoning.) Giant Eagle eventually withdrew from the agreement.

After Giant Eagle's withdrawal, TWG Development offered to buy the church and build senior housing on the property, contingent upon receipt of affordable-housing tax credits. However, the credits were not awarded promptly and the project was waitlisted. To prevent the building from being demolished in June 2017, St. John UCC asked for $75,000 to help cover maintenance costs. The credits were awarded in 2018, with TWG planning to begin construction of 60 two-bedroom apartments by the end of the year; the church building was to become the headquarters of an undisclosed non-profit.
