= German Goldsmith's House =

Museum of jewelry and hollowware

Coordinates: 50°08′12″N 8°55′04″E

The German Goldsmith's House (in German: Deutsches Goldschmiedehaus) is the former town hall of the old town of Hanau, which has been used as a museum for jewelry and hollowware (not only from Germany) since the beginning of the 20th century. The director since 2006 is Christianne Weber-Stöber, who holds a doctorate in jewelry history.

== Subsequent use ==
In 1821 the city administration moved out and into a building at Bangertstraße 2. After the city administrations of the old city and the new city of Hanau were merged in the third decade of the 19th century, a separate city hall for the old city was superfluous. It was now located altogether in the Neustadt town hall. The town hall building on Altstädter Markt was temporarily used as the seat of the Hanau District Court and then by various schools. From 1902 until World War II, it served as the museum of the Hanau History Society. In a former small courtyard there was a lapidarium.

During the air raids on Hanau in March 1945, the building burned down to the foundation walls and the two gable walls.

== Later structural changes ==
The half-timbered structure that can be seen today is a reconstruction from the years 1955-1958. A new staircase was added to the rear at that time. In accordance with its use as an exhibition space, the original room layout was dispensed with during reconstruction. In recent years, a modern annex was added to the rear for handicapped access and modern sanitary facilities.

On the south side, a plaque commemorates the Hanau chronicler and music teacher Johann Daniel Wilhelm Ziegler (1809–1878).

In 2004, an extensive archaeological excavation took place at the rear of the building, in its former courtyard, the evaluation of which has also been available since 2021.

== Present use ==
Hanau is one of Germany's cities of fine jewelry. The city has a tradition of the goldsmith's craft going back to the beginning of the 17th century and, with the Staatliche Zeichenakademie Hanau (State Drawing Academy), is the seat of a leading institution for the training of gold- and silversmiths and likewise the seat of the German Society for the Art of Goldsmithing. In a close cooperation between these institutions and through good connections in the Berlin party and leadership of the time, the German Goldsmiths' House was founded on 18 October 1942 and was given its seat in the building, for which purpose the museum of the Hanau History Society, which was located there at the time, was moved to the City Palace. Today, the German Goldsmiths' House hosts temporary exhibitions, especially presentations of author jewelry.

The goldsmith Ebbe Weiss-Weingart donated 250 pieces of jewelry from the years 1947 to 1998 to the city of Hanau for the German Goldsmiths' House, as an essential contribution to the collection begun in 1960, which today, with well over 1,200 pieces of jewelry and tableware, provides a representative overview of the national and international scene after 1945. The pieces were presented in the exhibition from 25 February 2018, to 3 June 2018 Ebbe Weiss-Weingart – 70 Years of Jewelry. Ebbe Weiss-Weingart has been involved in many exhibitions in well-known domestic and foreign museums, including Helsinki, Paris, Tokyo and the US.
