= A House Through Time =

BBC social history documentary series

- Genre: Documentary
- Presented by: David Olusoga
- Composer: Paul Honey
- Country of origin: United Kingdom
- Original language: English
- No. of series: 6
- No. of episodes: 24

Production
- Executive producer: Maxine Watson
- Producer: Mary Crisp
- Production locations: Liverpool (series 1); Newcastle upon Tyne (series 2); Bristol (series 3); Leeds (series 4); London and Berlin (series 5); Edinburgh (series 6)
- Production company: Twenty Twenty

Original release
- Network: BBC Two
- Release: 4 January 2018 – present

A House Through Time is a documentary television series made by Twenty Twenty Television for BBC Two. The first series aired in 2018, a second in 2019, a third in 2020, and a fourth in 2021, with each examining the history of a single residential building in an English city. A fifth series, in 2024, features apartment blocks in London and Berlin, while a sixth series focused on a tenement in Edinburgh, being broadcast in 2026.

The programme is presented by David Olusoga, who is Professor of Public History at Manchester University. The series consultants include design historian Professor Deborah Sugg Ryan, of the University of Portsmouth, and, in series 6, Meredith More of the V&A Dundee.

== Episodes ==
Series	Episodes	Originally released	
Series	Episodes	First released	Last released
1	4	4 January 2018	25 January 2018
2	4	8 April 2019	29 April 2019
3	4	26 May 2020	16 June 2020
4	4	7 September 2021	28 September 2021
5	4	17 October 2024	7 November 2024
6	4	13 August 2026	3 September 2026

=== Series 1 (2018) ===
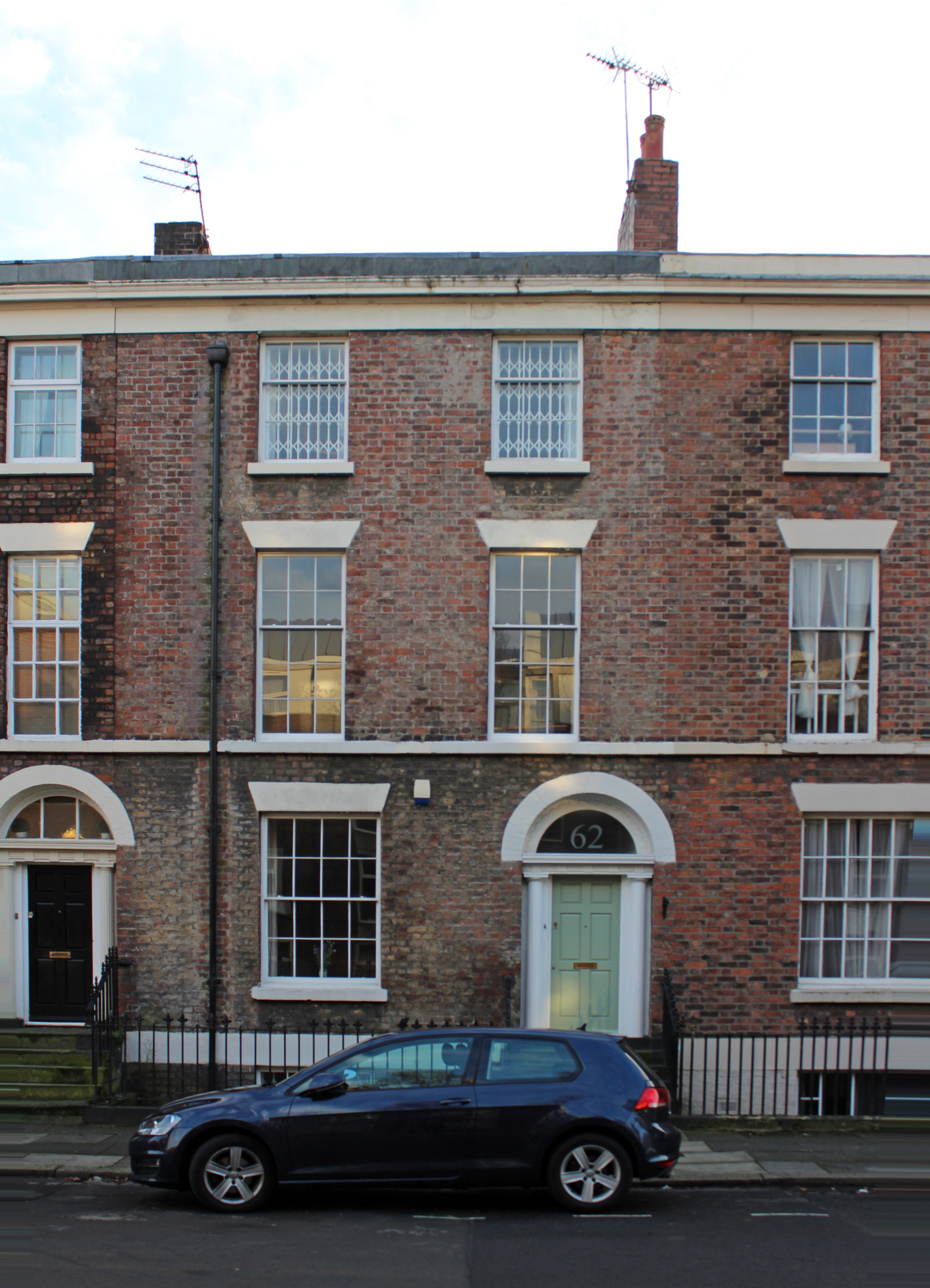
62, Falkner Street, 2018

The first series features the house at 62, Falkner Street (Note: 62, Falkner Street, Liverpool:53.39940°N 2.96685°W) in the Canning area of Liverpool.

No. overall	No. in series	Title	Directed by	Written by	Original release date	UK viewers (millions)
1	1	"Episode 1"	Paul Tilzey	David Olusoga	4 January 2018	3.13
David Olusoga visits the house at 62, Falkner Street for the first time, and explores the stories of its first inhabitants, who lived there in 1840s and 1850s.
2	2	"Episode 2"	Stuart Elliott	David Olusoga	11 January 2018	2.44
David looks at the trials and tribulations of 62, Falkner Street's residents from the 1850s through to the 1890s.
3	3	"Episode 3"	Stuart Elliott	David Olusoga	18 January 2018	2.44
David uncovers the lives of the house's residents from 1891 to 1945, covering World War I, World War II, and the Great Depression.
4	4	"Episode 4"	Paul Tilzey	David Olusoga	25 January 2018	2.47
David finally covers the house's residents from 1945 to the present day, and reveals the programme's findings to the house's present occupant.

=== Series 2 (2019) ===
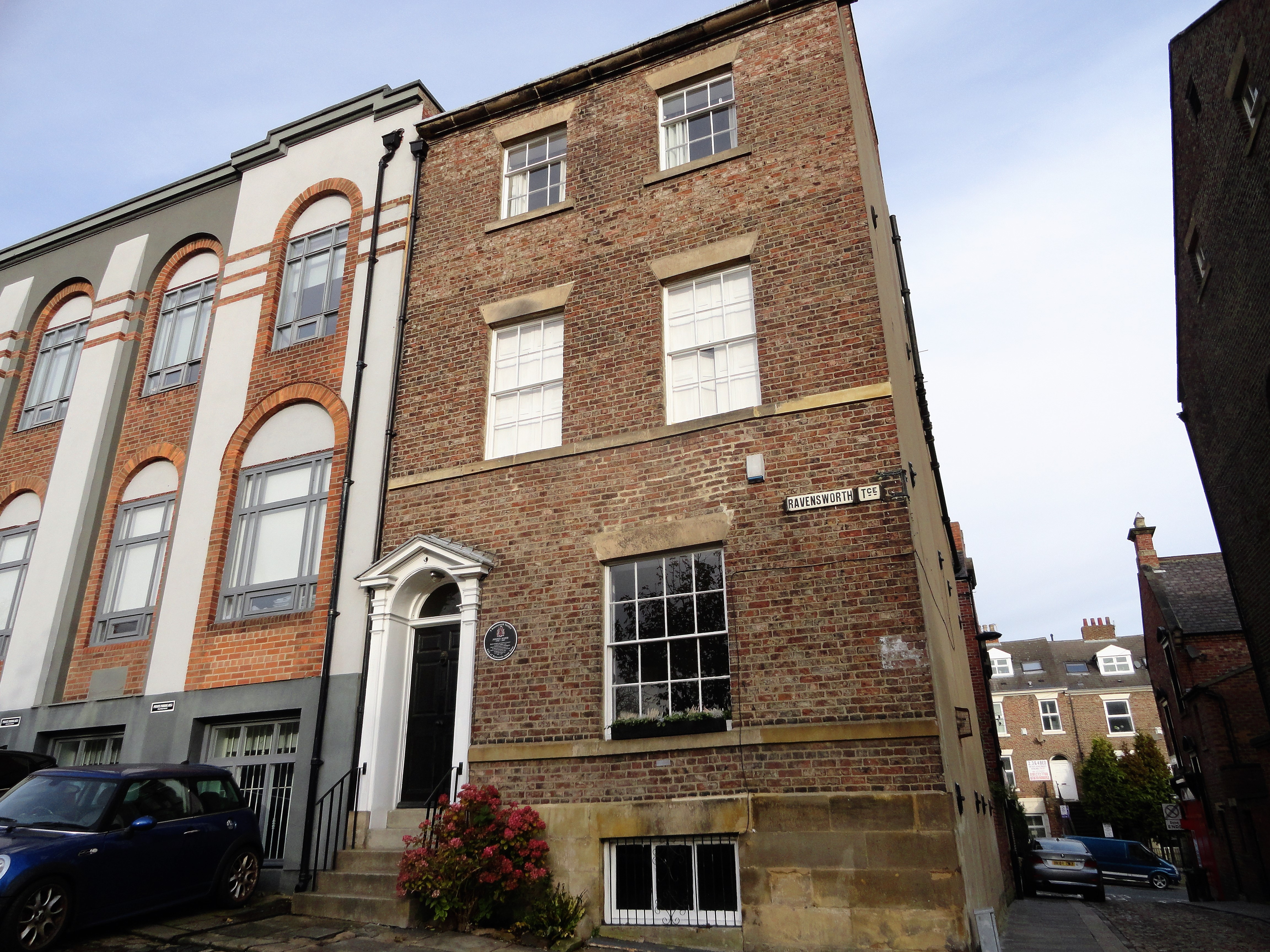
5 Ravensworth Terrace, Newcastle

Series two featured 5, Ravensworth Terrace, (Note: 5, Ravensworth Terrace, Newcastle-upon-Tyne: 54.971133°N 1.627024°W) a Georgian-era terraced house in the Summerhill area of Newcastle-upon-Tyne and began broadcast on BBC Two on 8 April 2019. As a result of research conducted for the programme, a plaque was unveiled there, commemorating a former resident (1841–1857), the naturalist Joshua Alder, on 26 September 2018 by Olusoga and the Lord Mayor of Newcastle, David Down. The house has been Grade II listed since June 1976.

No. overall	No. in series	Title	Directed by	Written by	Original release date	UK viewers (millions)
5	1	"Episode 1"	Nicola Seare	David Olusoga	8 April 2019	2.40
David Olusoga is in Newcastle upon Tyne, exploring the history of the house at 5, Ravensworth Terrace, looking at the stories of a vengeful lawyer, a scientist faced with financial ruin and a doctor entangled in a workhouse scandal- the house's earliest residents.
6	2	"Episode 2"	Hugo Macgregor	David Olusoga	15 April 2019	2.21
Now looking at the house in the 1880s to the 1900s, David encounters stories of family trauma, a refuge for girls, and séances.
7	3	"Episode 3"	Nicola Seare	David Olusoga	22 April 2019	2.30
5 Ravensworth Terrace's residents of the early 20th century deal with war, and Irish republican terrorism.
8	4	"Episode 4"	Hugo Macgregor	David Olusoga	29 April 2019	2.24
Bringing the story into the present day, David uncovers infidelity and divorce, traces a WWII prisoner to Ravensworth Terrace, and sees the house fall into disrepair before it is restored for the 21st century.

=== Series 3 (2020) ===
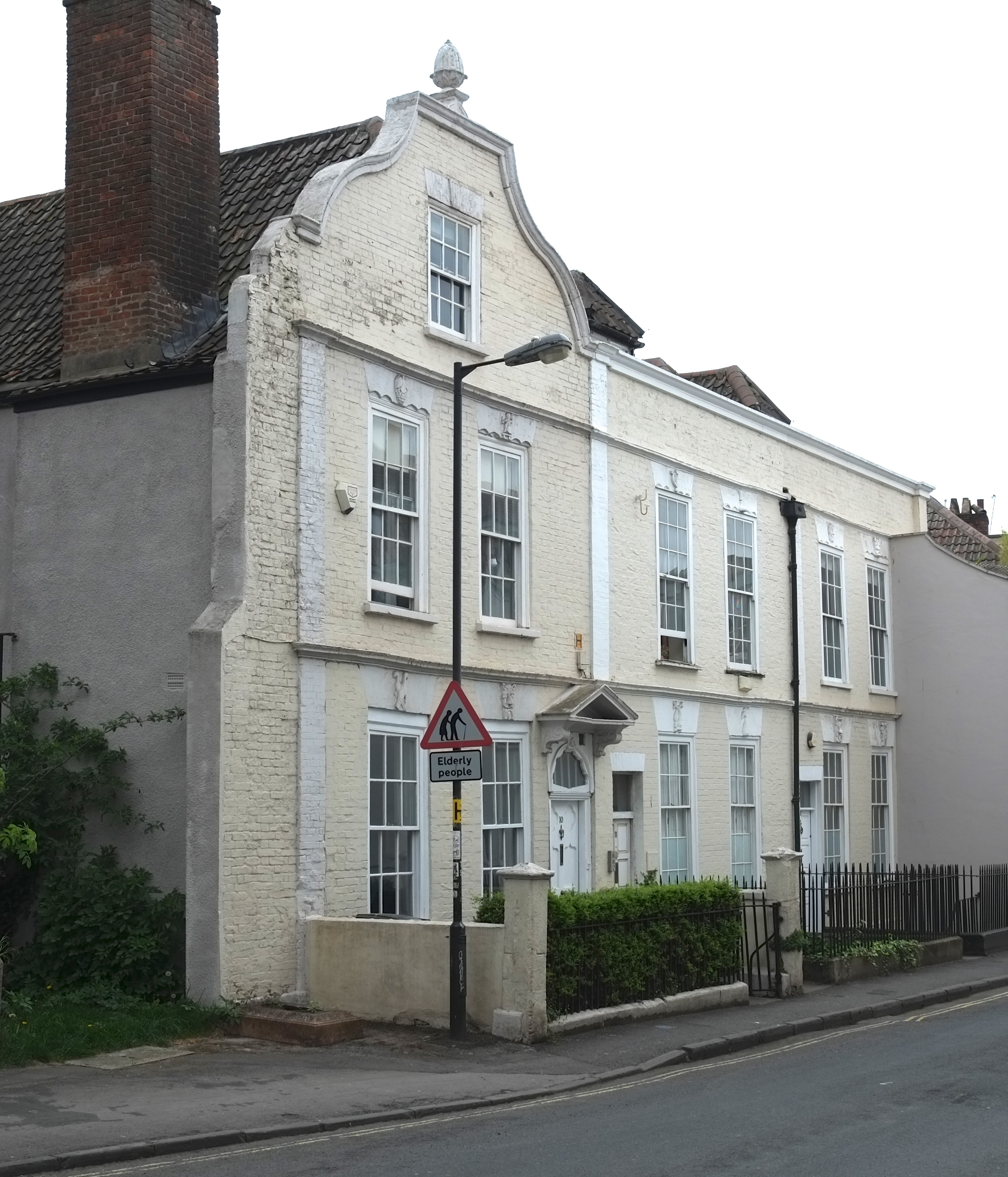
10, Guinea Street (nearest to camera)

The third series takes place in Bristol, investigating the history of 10, Guinea Street, (Note: 10, Guinea Street, Bristol: 51.4472°N 2.59212°W) whose inhabitants included the satirist John Shebbeare and the future mayor of Bristol Sir John Kerle Haberfield. The house has been Grade II* listed since December 1994.

No. overall	No. in series	Title	Directed by	Written by	Original release date	UK viewers (millions)
9	1	"Episode 1"	Eleanor Scoones	David Olusoga	26 May 2020	4.16
David's journey with 10, Guinea Street, Bristol, begins in the 18th century. The first occupants bring stories of piracy, a foundling, the satirist John Shebbeare, and a runaway slave.
10	2	"Episode 2"	Edmund Moriarty	David Olusoga	2 June 2020	3.38
David looks at the house's residents from the late 18th century to the mid-19th century, encountering stories of scandal, domestic violence and the asylum.
11	3	"Episode 3"	Eleanor Scoones	David Olusoga	9 June 2020	3.07
The mid-19th to mid-20th century sees the residents of 10, Guinea Street explore entrepreneurship, tragedy in World War I, and some shady dealings.
12	4	"Episode 4"	Edmund Moriarty	David Olusoga	16 June 2020	2.61
Exploring the house's history from the mid-20th century to the present day, David finds out about the house's links to more war tragedy, identity fraud, and the house's renewal in the 21st century.

=== Series 4 (2021) ===
The fourth series takes place at 5, Grosvenor Mount, (Note: 5, Grosvenor Mount, Leeds: 53.817659°N 1.562932°W) in the Headingley area of Leeds. With the other two houses in its terrace, it has been Grade II listed since August 1976.

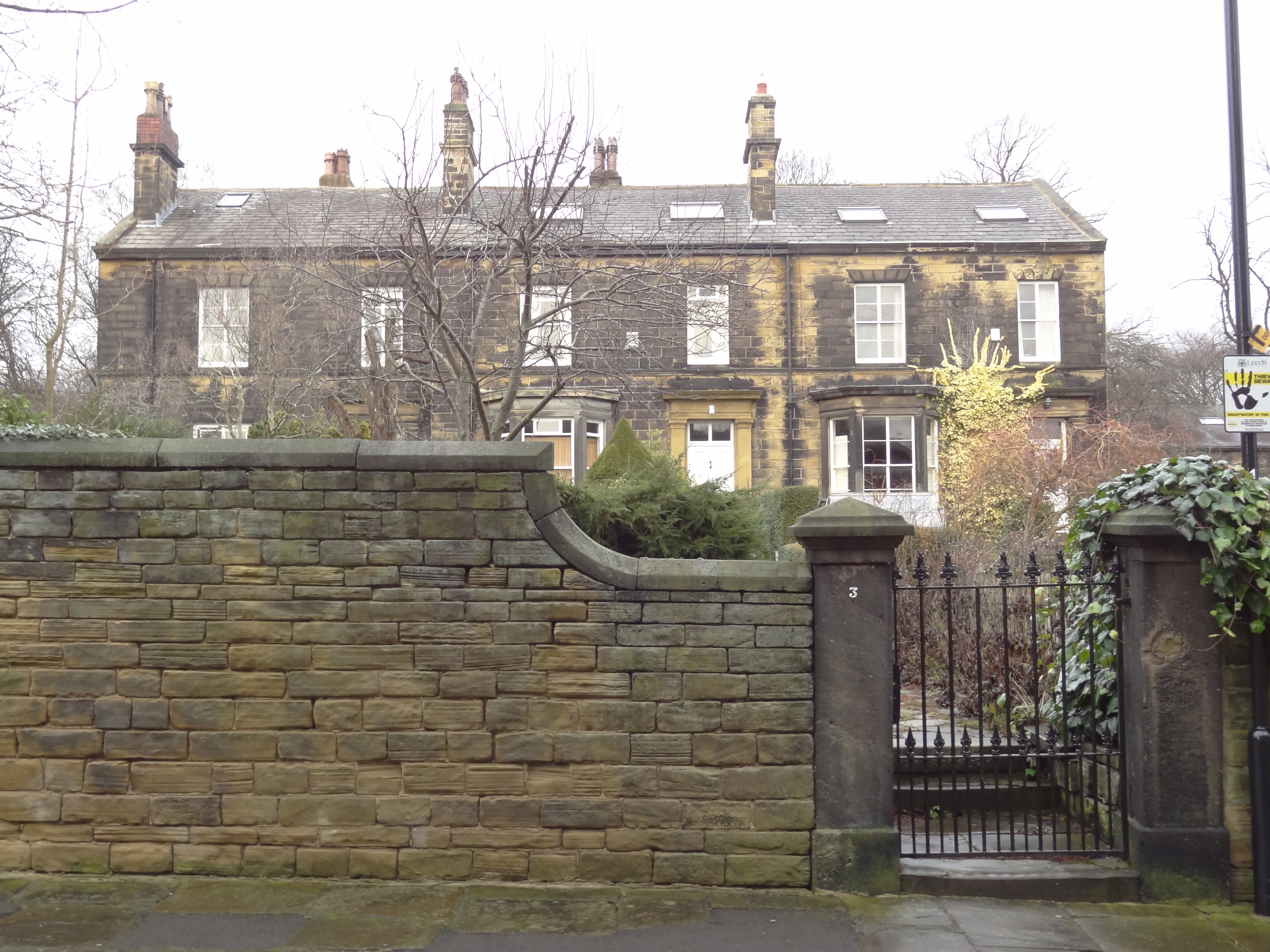
1,3 & 5, Grosvenor Mount (number 5 on the right)

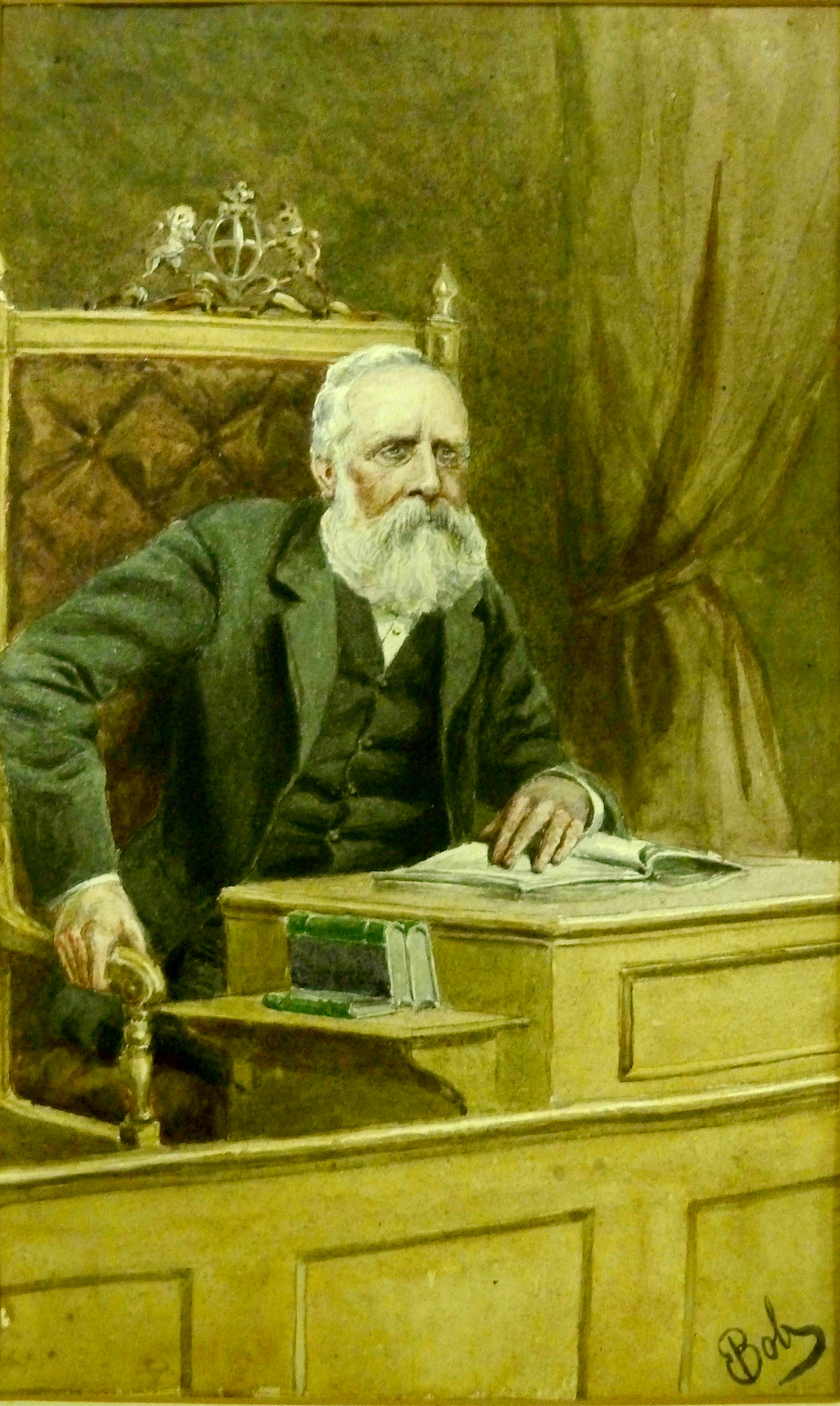
The house's first occupant, William Bruce painted by Michael Anthony Hilliard Willson ("Bob") in 1890 or 1891

No. overall	No. in series	Title	Directed by	Written by	Original release date	UK viewers (millions)
13	1	"Episode 1"	Nick Tanner	David Olusoga	7 September 2021	2.16
The house is completed in 1852 and occupied by William Bruce, a solicitor, and his wife Helen.
14	2	"Episode 2"	Kemi Majekodunmi	David Olusoga	14 September 2021	N/A
15	3	"Episode 3"	Edmund Moriarty	David Olusoga	21 September 2021	N/A
16	4	"Episode 4"	Nicola Seare	David Olusoga	28 September 2021	N/A

=== Series 5 (2024) ===
Series 5, subtitled Two Cities at War, takes a different approach, comparing and contrasting the lives of the inhabitants of two apartment blocks—Block 2 of Montagu Mansions, (Note: Montagu Mansions, Marylebone, London: 51.519703°N 0.157540°W) an Edwardian building in the Marylebone district of London and 72, Pfalzburger Strasse, Wilmersdorf, Berlin (Note: 72, Pfalzburger Strasse, Wilmersdorf, Berlin: 52.496068°N 13.322448°E) in Wilmersdorf, Berlin—in the years leading up to and during World War II. Residents in London included the cinema impresario Cecil Bernstein and the poet and conscientious objector Timothy Corsellis, and in Berlin the chef and language teacher, Bonifatius Folli, from Togo, the historian and Nazi, Paul Dittel, and Freda Fromm, whose brother Friedrich Fromm was a regular visitor.

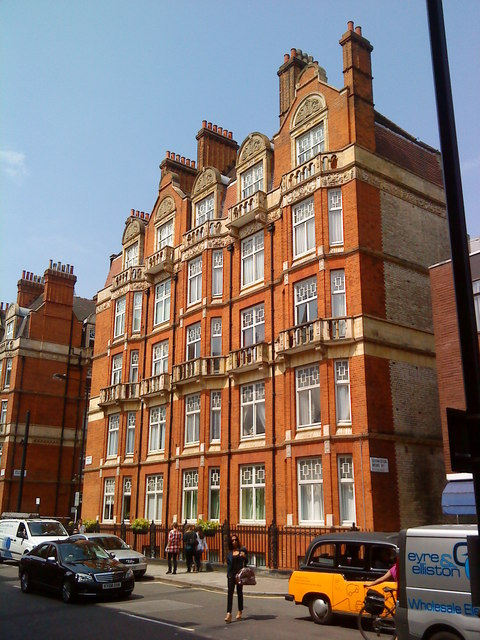
Montagu Mansions, Marylebone

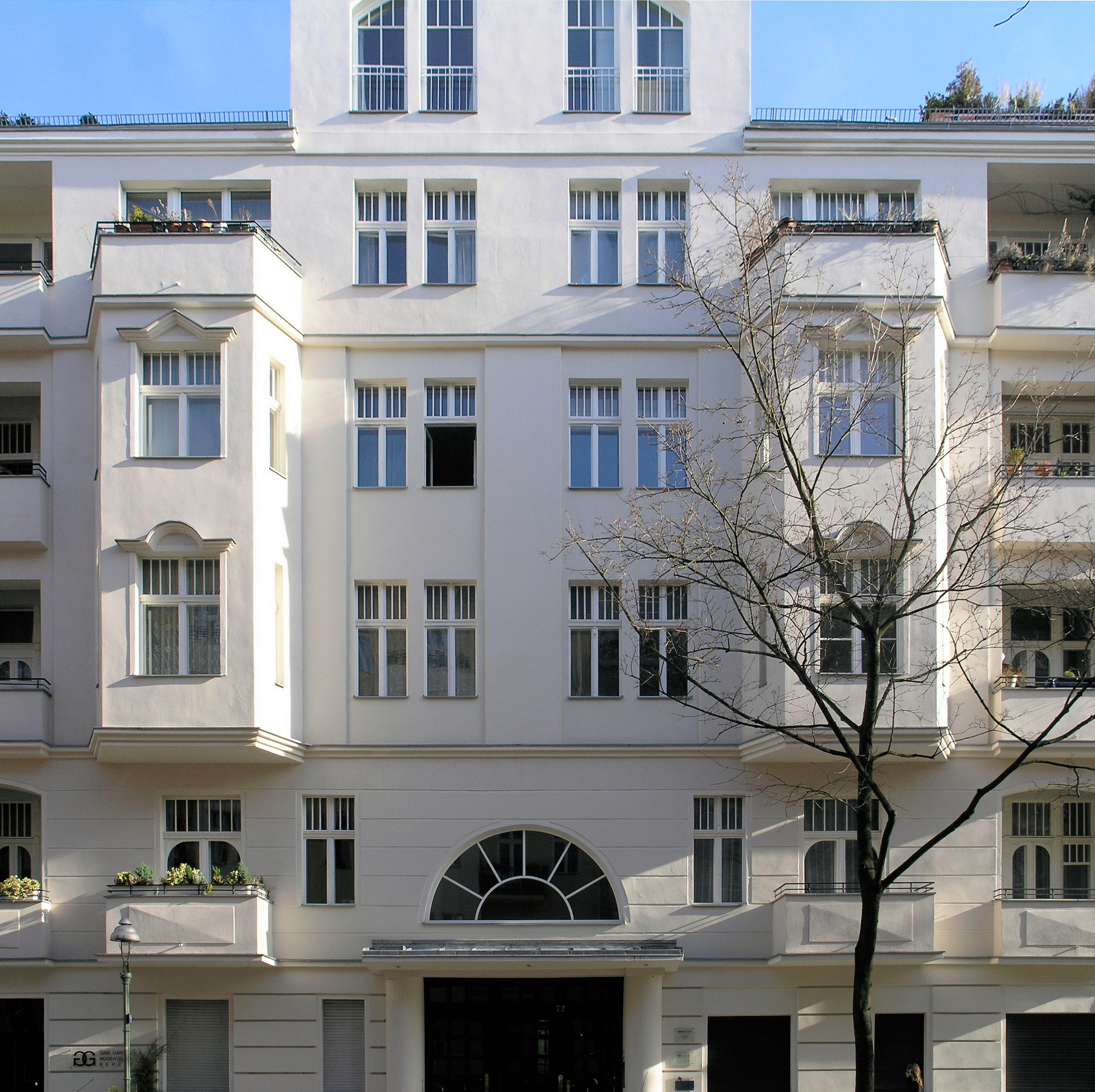
Pfalzburger Straße 72 in Berlin-Wilmersdorf

=== Series 6 (2026) ===
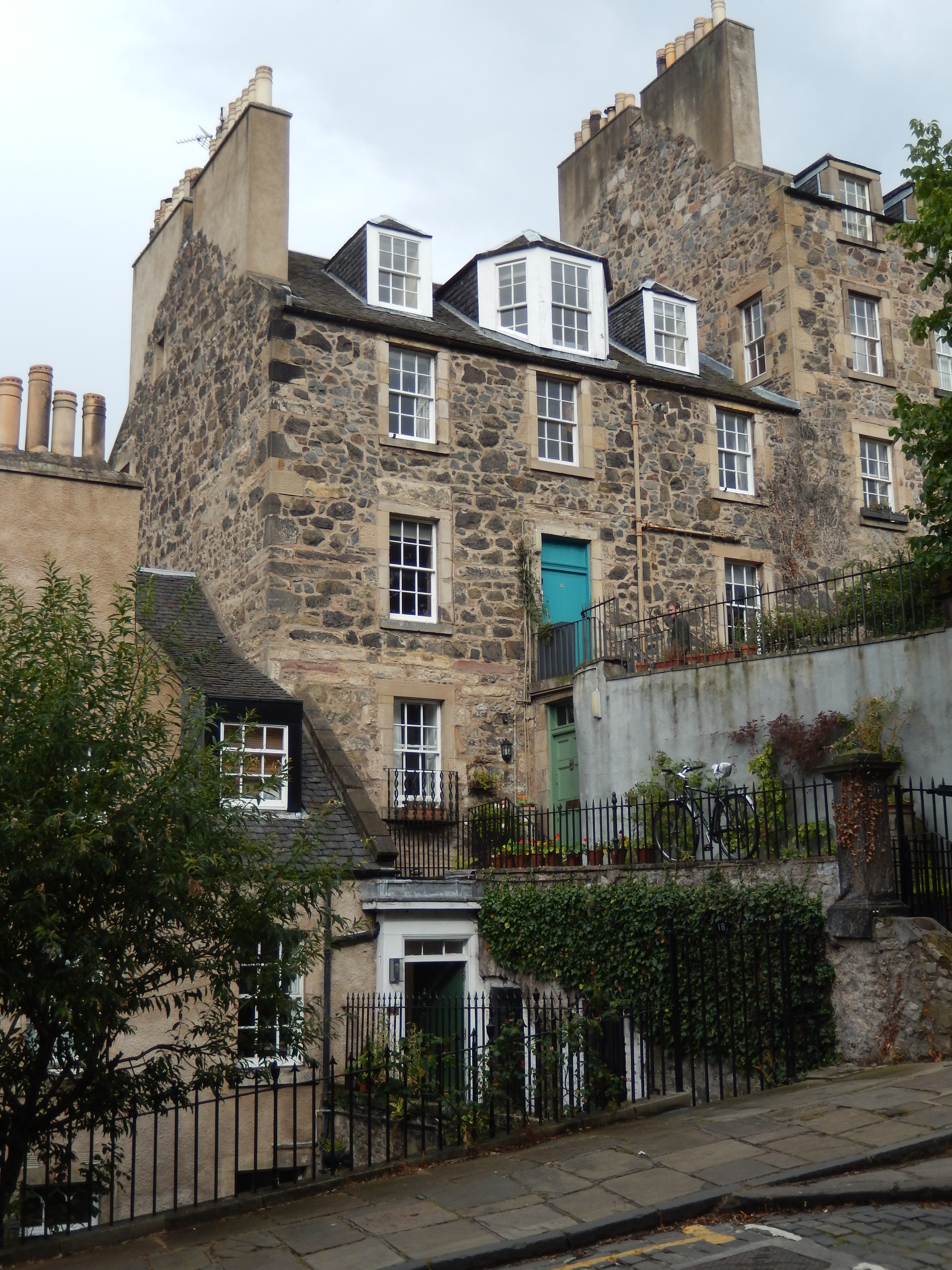
20/22 Calton Hill - the three white dormer windows are on number 22

Series 6 describes multiple dwellings in a single, five-story, 18th-century tenement building, 20/22, Calton Hill, (Note: 20/22, Calton Hill, Edinburgh: 55.954456°N 3.185709°W) in the Calton Hill district of Edinburgh, Scotland. Meredith More of the V&A Dundee appears in each episode to provide context.

Of the two addresses, number 20 comprises the lower two floors, which were built first. Later, the house was extended upwards, adding a "raised ground floor", first floor, and attic; collectively these are number 22, and have always been apartments, in various configurations. Number 20 was the childhood home of the sculptor John Steell Jnr. Later occupants of number 22 include the photographer Archibald Burns.

The building has been category B listed since April 1966.

== See also ==
- The Secret History of Our Streets
