= Falkner Square =

Square and public gardens in Toxteth, Liverpool, England

Coordinates: 53.3982°N 2.9629°W

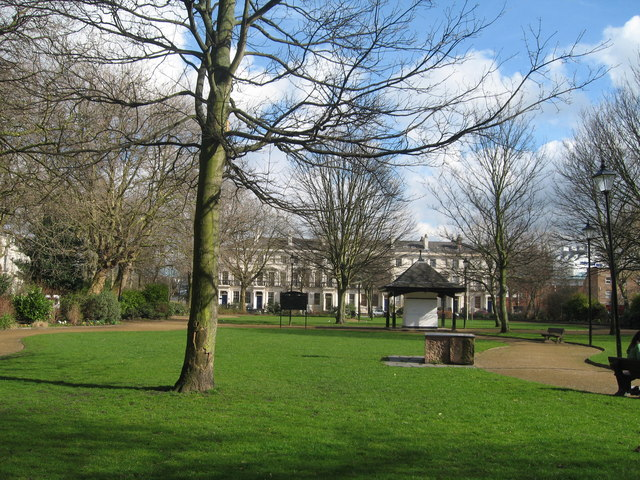
Falkner Square.

Falkner Square is a square in Canning on the border of Liverpool city centre and Toxteth. Falkner Square Gardens occupy the centre of the square. The Square was completed in 1830 and in 1835 the central area was acquired as a park, one of the first areas so acquired by the council.

== History ==
Falkner Square is named after Edward Falkner, soldier and Sheriff of Lancashire, who mustered 1000 men in a single hour for the defence of Liverpool in 1797 when a French invasion threatened. He wanted it called Wellington Square. It dates from 1835 and was one of the city's first open public spaces. However, at the time it was unpopular and considered too far out of town, especially as regards the long uphill hike for horse-drawn vehicles. The townspeople nicknamed it Falkner's Folly, on account of the land being formerly known as Moss Lake Fields. Following construction, many of the houses remained vacant as prospective buyers were concerned the houses may subside due to being built on marshy ground; in response, Falkner drained part of the land and redirected the creek, and in due course the area become popular.

During World War II, the public garden was utilised as a location for air-raid shelters, though it was fully reinstated after the war and now forms part of the Georgian Quarter. Today, the area is maintained by Liverpool City Council, who have restored cobbles and original period street furniture.

In 1993, on the 50th anniversary of the Battle of the Atlantic a war memorial was installed to commemorate black and Commonwealth seamen who served during World War 2.
