= German Church, Liverpool =

Church building in Liverpool, England

Coordinates: 53.400°N 2.966°W

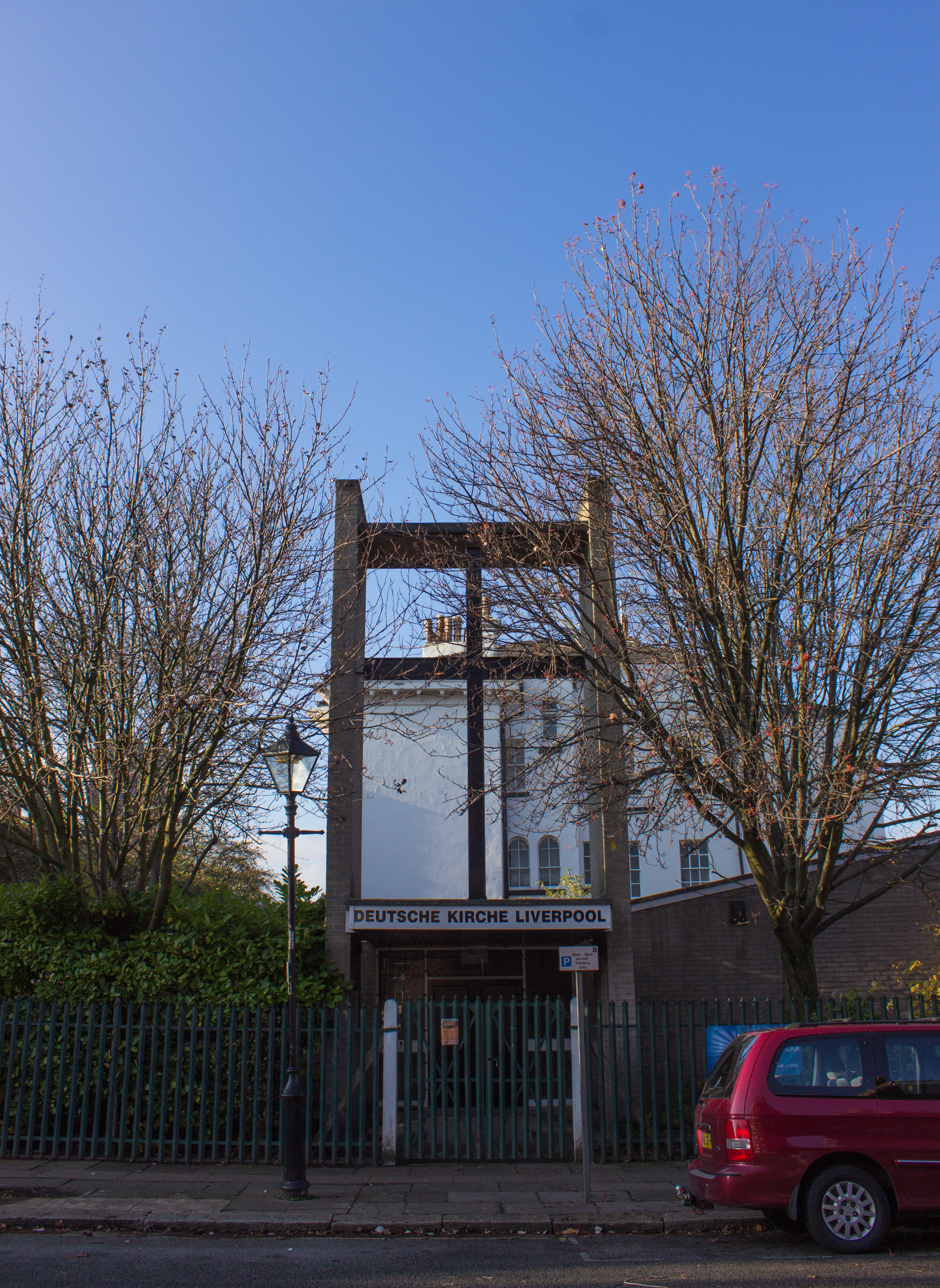

The German Church (German: Deutsche Kirche) in Liverpool is in Bedford Street South/ Canning Street and is part of the German speaking churches of North England.

The North of England German Protestant churches are members of the "Synod of German-speaking Lutheran, Reformed and United Congregations in Great Britain" and come under the care of the overseas department of the Protestant Church in Germany. Services in German are held twice a month on the first (4:00 pm) and third Sundays (11:00 am).

Regular Groups include a Faith discussion group, Wirral Circle and a Toddler Play Group.

== Origins ==
In the 1840s an English cleric from the Church of England (Anglican Communion) came across a prayer meeting of some Germans in a disused ship on the River Mersey, a man was ordained and ministered to this congregation. Initially it was a German-speaking congregation in the Church of England, later to become affiliated with the Lutheran-Protestant church.

This is the origin of the German Lutheran-Protestant (E.K.D.) congregation in Liverpool. After using many different buildings for worship and education, it built its own structure in 1960.

== See also ==
- Religion in the United Kingdom
