= Spineless =

Spineless may refer to:

- An animal that lacks a spinal column, such as an arthropod.
- Slang term for someone who shows cowardice
- "Spineless", song by Alanis Morisette from her album So-Called Chaos

== See also ==
- Spine (disambiguation)
