= Bublik (surname) =

Bublik (Ukrainian: Бублик) (sometimes spelled as Bublick) is a Ukrainian-language surname, common in Ukraine, Belarus and Southern Russia (Kuban), historically an ethnic Ukrainian region. The name comes from the bagel-like food called bublik, which is common in Eastern Europe.

It may refer to:

- Alexander Bublik (born 1997), Kazakh tennis player
- Gedaliah Bublick (1875–1948), Yiddish writer
- Ladislav Bublík (1924–1988), Czech writer
- Solomon Bublick (died 1945), American philanthropist
