= List of tallest buildings and structures in Liverpool =

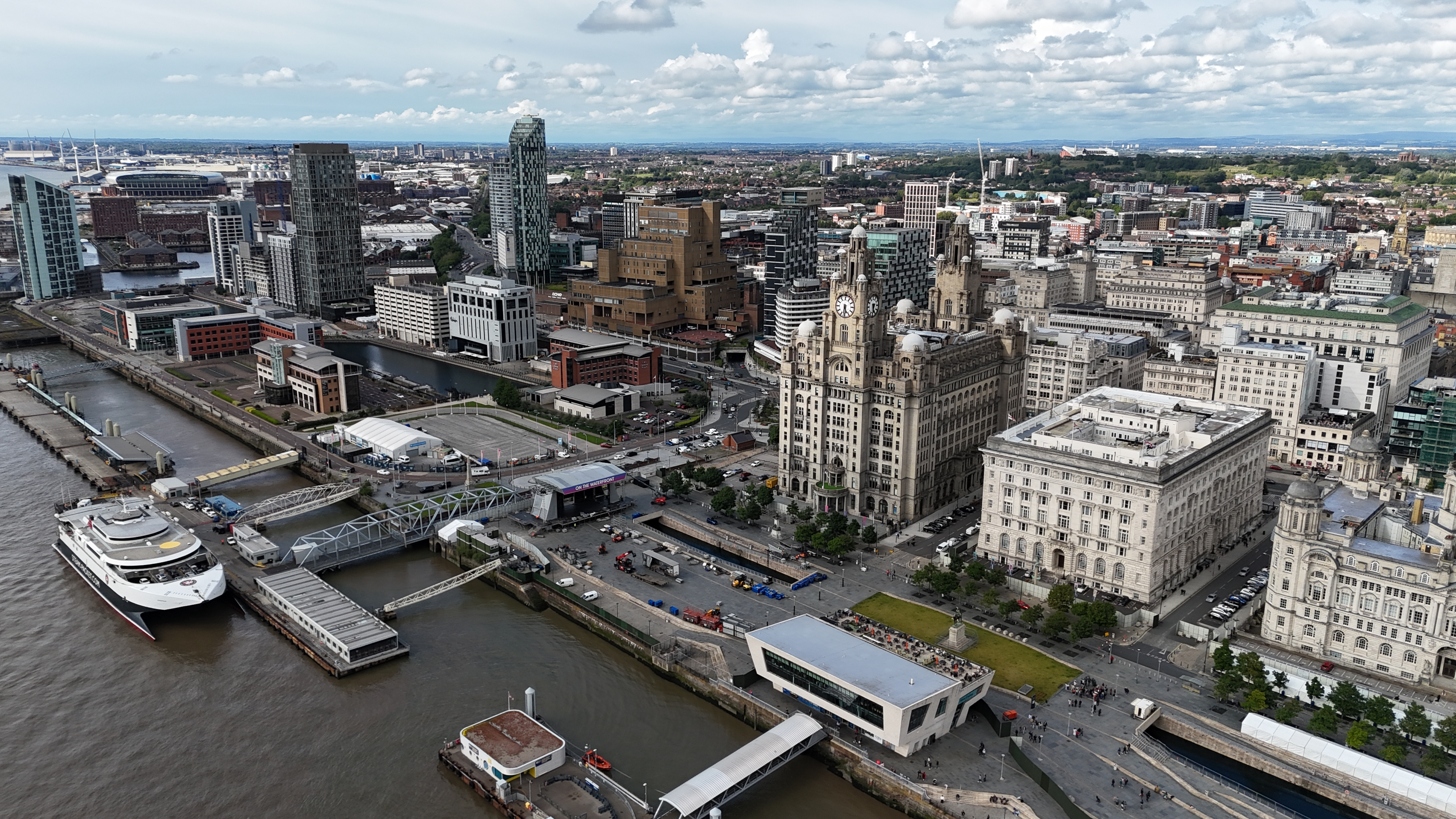
Architectural styles of Liverpool's tallest buildings vary greatly; most are found in the city centre.

This list of the tallest buildings and structures in Liverpool ranks high-rise structures in Liverpool, England, by height (buildings in the wider Liverpool Urban Area are listed separately within the article). The tallest building in Liverpool is currently the 40-storey West Tower, which rises 140 metres (459 ft) on Liverpool's waterfront. It is also the tallest habitable building in the United Kingdom outside of London, Birmingham and Manchester. Liverpool is a city undergoing mass regeneration, with older buildings being demolished to make way for new developments. During the mid-2000s, ten 1960s apartment blocks over 50 metres (164 ft) tall in the city were demolished.

The history of tall buildings and structures in Liverpool began in 1911, with the completion of the Royal Liver Building. Standing at 98 metres (322 ft) tall, it was widely reported to be Britain's first skyscraper. This period marked the pinnacle of Liverpool's economic success, when it regarded itself as the "second city" of the British Empire. In 1965, its 54-year reign as the tallest building in Liverpool came to an end with the completion of the Radio City Tower. At 138 metres (453 ft), it originally housed a revolving restaurant and then, since 2000, a radio station. In 2008, the Radio City Tower was topped by Beetham Organization's West Tower.

A masterplan, envisioned by Peel Holdings, to redevelop Liverpool's north docks, named Liverpool Waters, was launched in 2006 and received Government backing in 2013; it includes proposals for multiple high-rise buildings that will considerably change the city's skyline over the next few decades. The first building of the project began construction in 2018.

By far the tallest building ever envisaged for Liverpool was Otterspool Tower at 305 metres (1,001 ft) and 79 storeys. However, the 1998 proposal was never built. Other 50+ storey high designs that never materialised include the 2007 proposals of Shanghai Tower at 200 metres (656 ft) and King Edward Tower at 170 metres (558 ft) tall, Brunswick Quay at 166 metres (545 ft), proposed in 2005, and the original 1925 design for Liverpool Metropolitan Cathedral at 158 metres (518 ft).

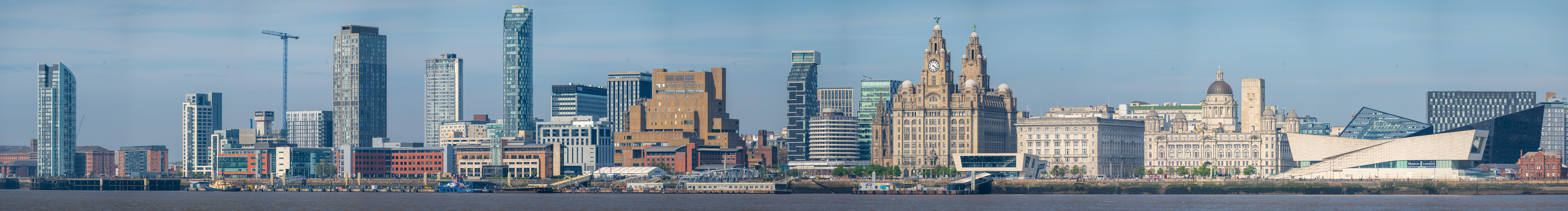
Panoramic view of Liverpool seen from Birkenhead, the Wirral in May 2024. The Three Graces, museum and skyscrapers of the commercial district are all visible.

== Tallest completed buildings and structures ==
This list ranks completed buildings and structures in Liverpool that are at least 49 m (160 ft) tall; under construction, proposed and cancelled buildings are excluded. Generic structures such as transmitters or wind turbines are also omitted.

Note this list is not comprehensive, as the heights of a number of candidate structures are unknown. Only those with known heights are included.

An equal sign (=) following a rank indicates the same height between two or more buildings. Heights are rounded to the nearest whole metre. The "Year" column refers to the year when the building reached its current height; generally this is the year of construction but for some the height was reached following alterations and additions to the existing structure.

Rank	Name (alternative names)	Image	Height		Floors	Year	Coordinates	Notes
1	West Tower (Beetham West Tower)		140 m	460 ft	40	2008	53°24′36″N 2°59′48″W	
2	Radio City Tower (St. John's Beacon, St. John's Tower)		138 m	453 ft	N/A	1965	53°24′23″N 2°58′55″W	
3	The Lexington		113 m	371 ft	35	2021	53°24′36″N 2°59′55″W	
4	Lighthaus		108 m	354 ft	31	2025	53°24′38″N 2°59′55″W	
5	Liverpool Cathedral (Cathedral Church of Christ in Liverpool, Anglican Cathedral)		101 m	331 ft	N/A	1978	53°23′51″N 2°58′23″W	
6	Royal Liver Building (The Liver Building, Royal Liver Assurance)		98 m	322 ft	13	1911	53°24′21″N 2°59′45″W	
7	Beetham Tower		90 m	300 ft	27	2004	53°24′36″N 2°59′49″W	
8	Alexandra Tower		88 m	289 ft	27	2008	53°24′23″N 2°59′50″W	
9	Unity Residential		86 m	282 ft	27	2007	53°24′27″N 2°59′42″W	
10	Liverpool Metropolitan Cathedral (Metropolitan Cathedral of Christ the King)		85 m	279 ft	N/A	1967	53°24′17″N 2°58′04″W	
11	X1 The Tower		77 m	253 ft	25	2018	53°23′37″N 2°58′57″W	
12	New Hall Place (The Capital, Royal & SunAlliance Building, The Sandcastle)		76 m	249 ft	13	1974	53°24′33″N 2°59′41″W	
13	Metropolitan House (City Tower, Post & Echo Building)		73 m	240 ft	18	1974	53°24′34″N 2°59′40″W	
14=	1 Princes Dock		68 m	223 ft	22	2006	53°24′39″N 2°59′58″W	
14=	Municipal Buildings		68 m	223 ft	3	1868	53°24′30″N 2°59′10″W	
16=	Royal Liverpool University Hospital Boiler House		67 m	220 ft	N/A	1978	53°24′37″N 2°57′48″W	
16=	Port of Liverpool Building (MDHB Building, Dock Office)		67 m	220 ft	7	1907	53°24′15″N 2°59′41″W	
18=	The Spine		65 m	213 ft	14	2021	53°24′24″N 2°57′39″W	
18=	Horizon Heights (UNITE Students – Horizon Heights)		65 m	213 ft	21	2019	53°24′24″N 2°58′41″W	
18=	Unity Commercial		65 m	213 ft	16	2007	53°24′27″N 2°59′42″W	
18=	The Plaza (Sir John Moores Building)		65 m	213 ft	18	1965	53°24′39″N 2°59′41″W	
22	Welsh Presbyterian Church (Toxteth Cathedral)		61 m	200 ft	N/A	1867	53°23′38″N 2°57′50″W	
23=	Wheel of Liverpool Ferris wheel		60 m	200 ft	N/A	2009	53°23′54″N 2°59′26″W	
23=	George's Dock Ventilation Building for Queensway Tunnel		60 m	200 ft	6	1934	53°24′17″N 2°59′38″W	
23=	North John Street Ventilation Station		60 m	200 ft	N/A	1935	53°24′25″N 2°59′22″W	
26	Novotel Paddington Village		59 m	194 ft	17	2022	53°24′25″N 2°59′22″W	
27	Queen Elizabeth II Law Courts (Liverpool Crown Court)		58 m	190 ft	9	1984	53°24′16″N 2°59′23″W	
28	Silkhouse Court		56 m	184 ft	15	1970	53°24′31″N 2°59′30″W	
29=	Mann Island Building 3		53 m	174 ft	13	2011	53°24′14″N 2°59′35″W	
29=	Victoria Building (Victoria Gallery & Museum)		53 m	174 ft	3	1892	53°24′22″N 2°58′00″W	
29=	Church of Our Lady and St. Nicholas (Liverpool Parish Church, the Sailors' Church, Landmark Tower)		53 m	174 ft	N/A	1815	53°24′25″N 2°59′41″W	
29=	Anfield		52 m	171 ft	N/A	2016	53°25′51″N 2°57′39″W	
29=	One Park West Block B		52 m	171 ft	17	2009	53°24′11″N 2°59′23″W	
29=	Bankfield Grain Silo (S & B Herba Foods Regent Mill)		52 m	171 ft	N/A	1950s	53°26′12″N 2°59′51″W	
35	Plaza 1821		51 m	167 ft	15	2020	53°24′38″N 2°59′57″W	
36	The Copper House (21 Strand Street)		50 m	160 ft	16	2021	53°24′13″N 2°59′27″W	
37=	One Park West Block A		49 m	161 ft	15	2009	53°24′11″N 2°59′25″W	
37=	Heysmoor Heights		49 m	161 ft	17	2007	53°23′22″N 2°57′01″W	
37=	Kingsway Tunnel Ventilation Station (Victoria Ventilation Station)		49 m	161 ft	N/A	1971	53°24′55″N 2°59′57″W	
37=	India Buildings		49 m	161 ft	11	1933	53°24′22″N 2°59′33″W	
41=	Wellington Buildings		49 m	161 ft	12	1925	53°24′21″N 2°59′37″W	
41=	Royal Insurance Building (Aloft Hotel Liverpool)		49 m	161 ft	4	1903	53°24′27″N 2°59′21″W	
41=	Cains Brewery Building		49 m	161 ft	5	1902	53°23′37″N 2°58′42″W	
41=	St. Mary's Church		49 m	161 ft	N/A	1856	53°26′00″N 2°54′31″W	
41=	Church of Saint Francis Xavier		49 m	161 ft	N/A	1848	53°24′48″N 2°58′11″W	

A height comparison of the ten tallest buildings and structures in Liverpool.

== Tallest by type ==
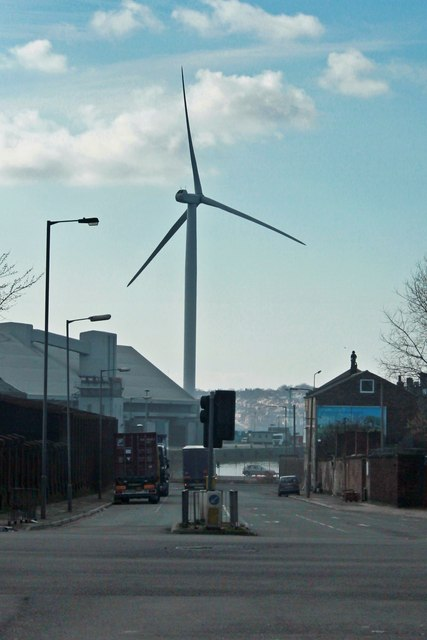
Canada Dock turbine

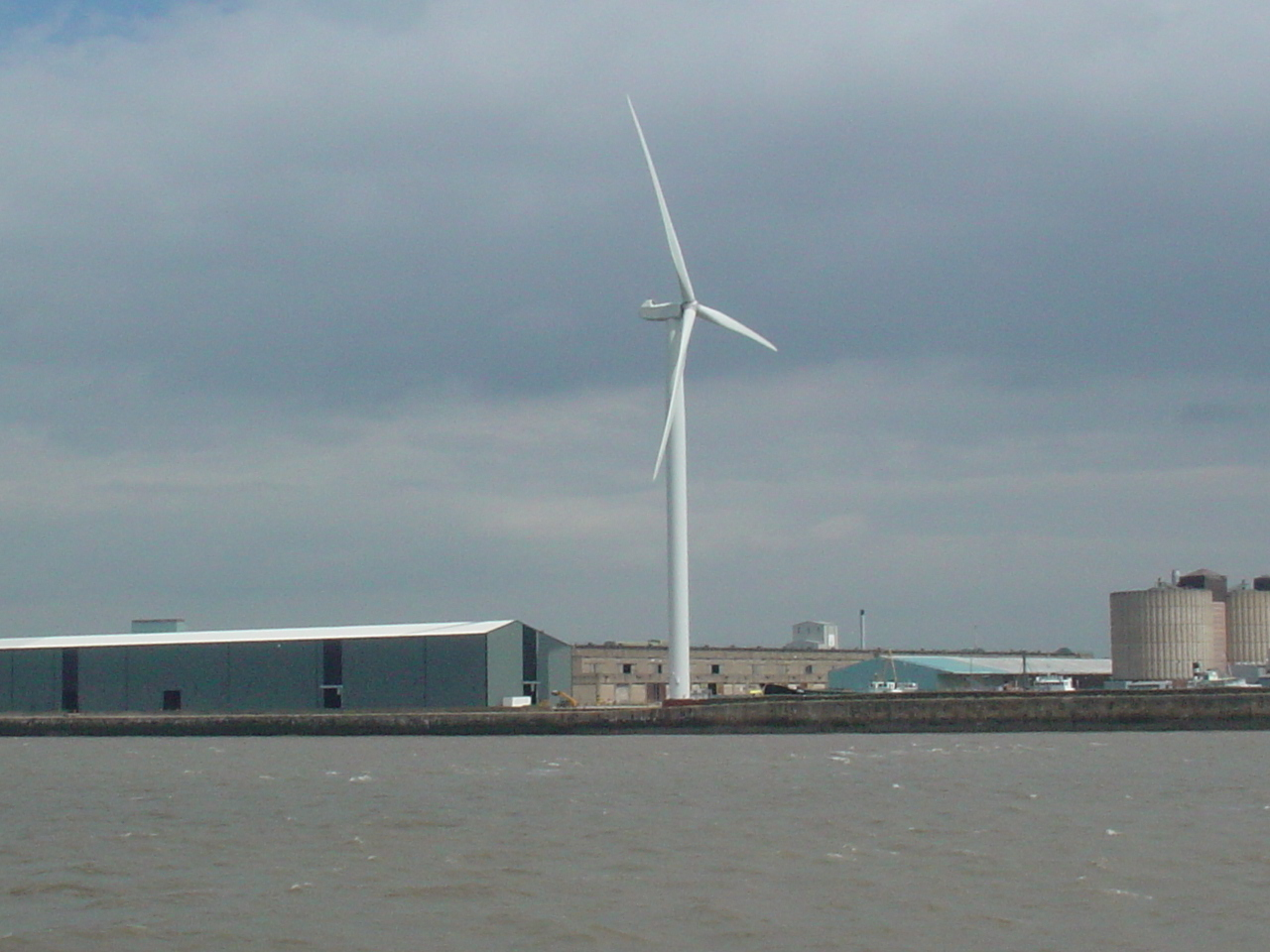
Huskisson Dock turbine

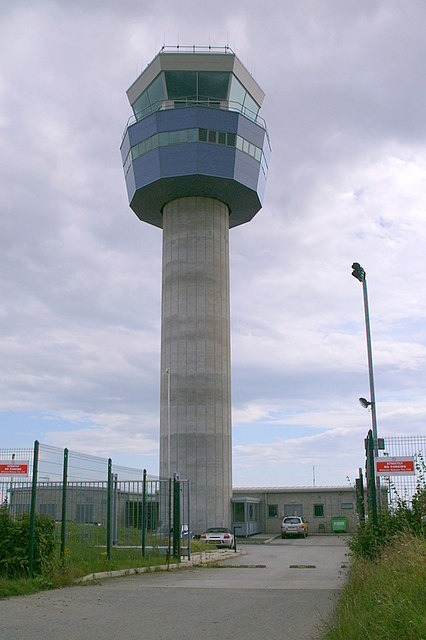
JLA control tower

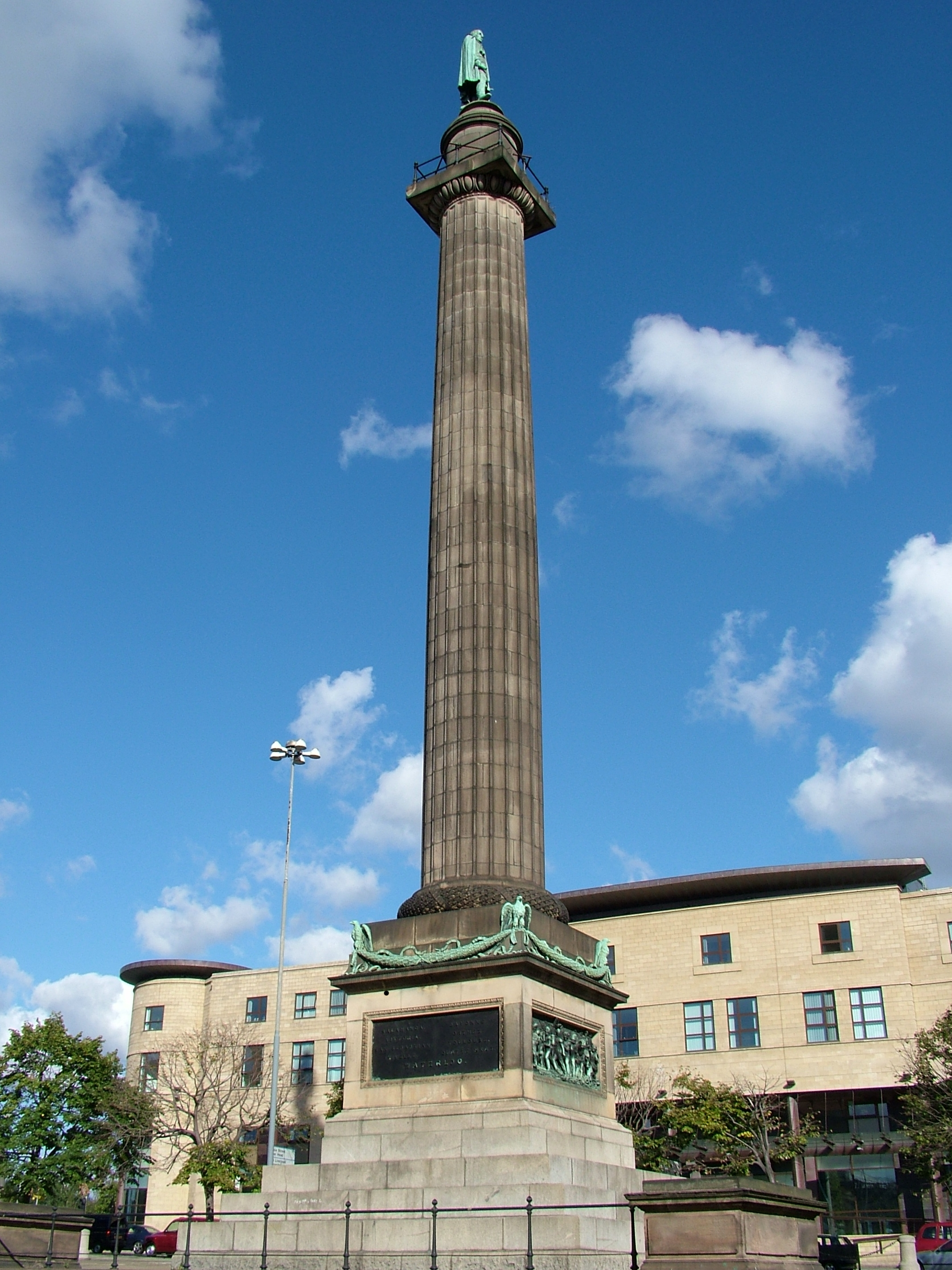
Wellington's column

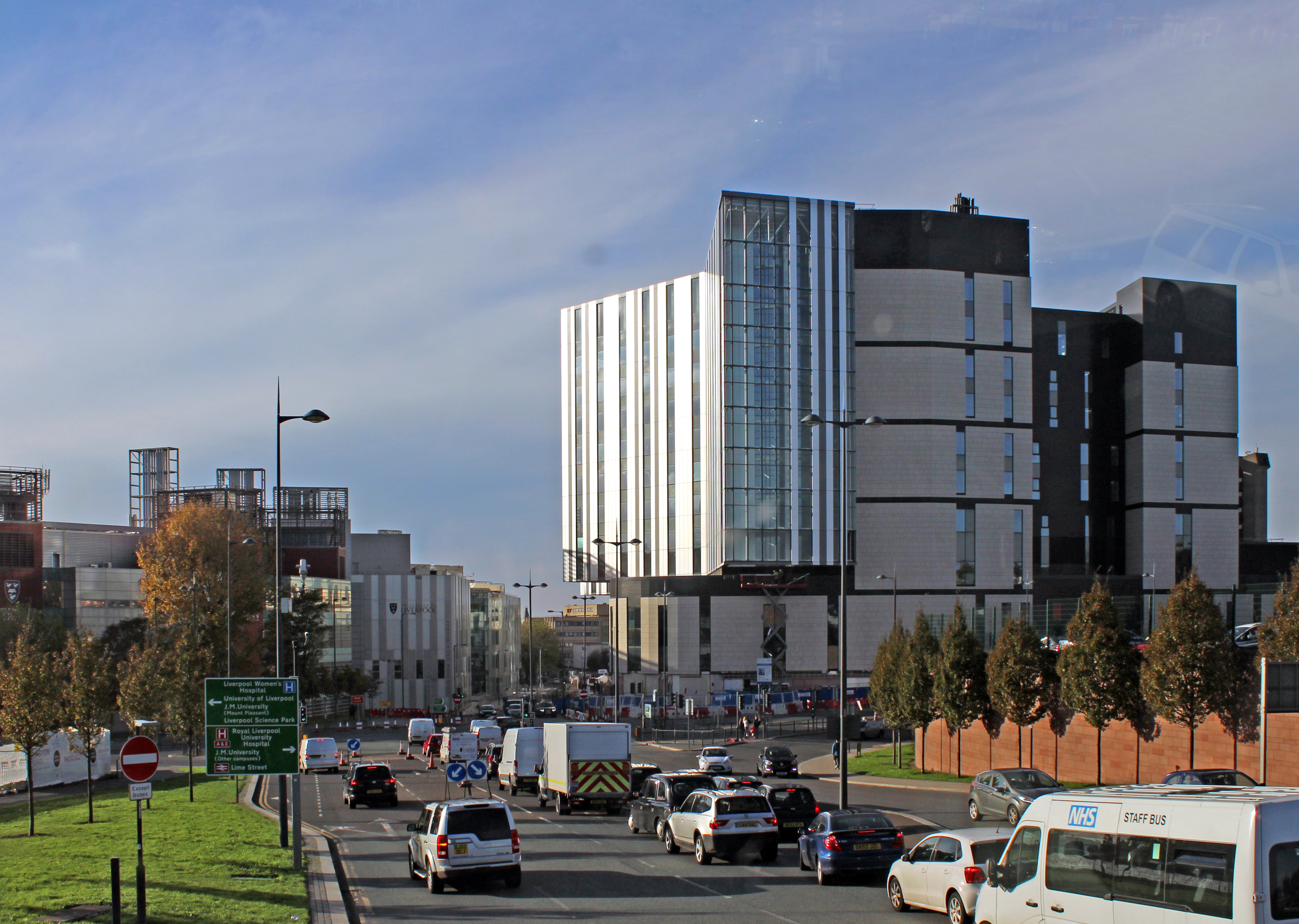
Royal Liverpool University Hospital

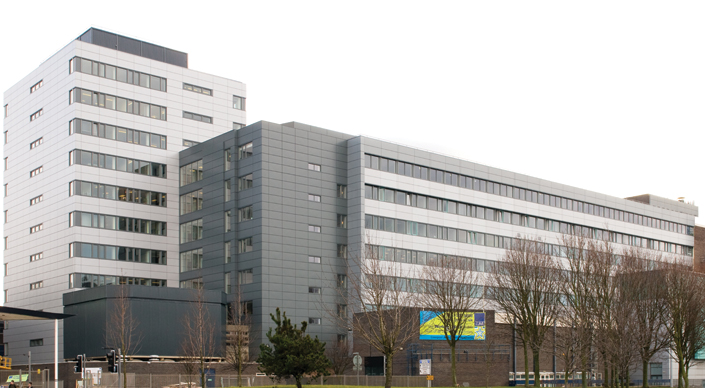
James Parsons Building

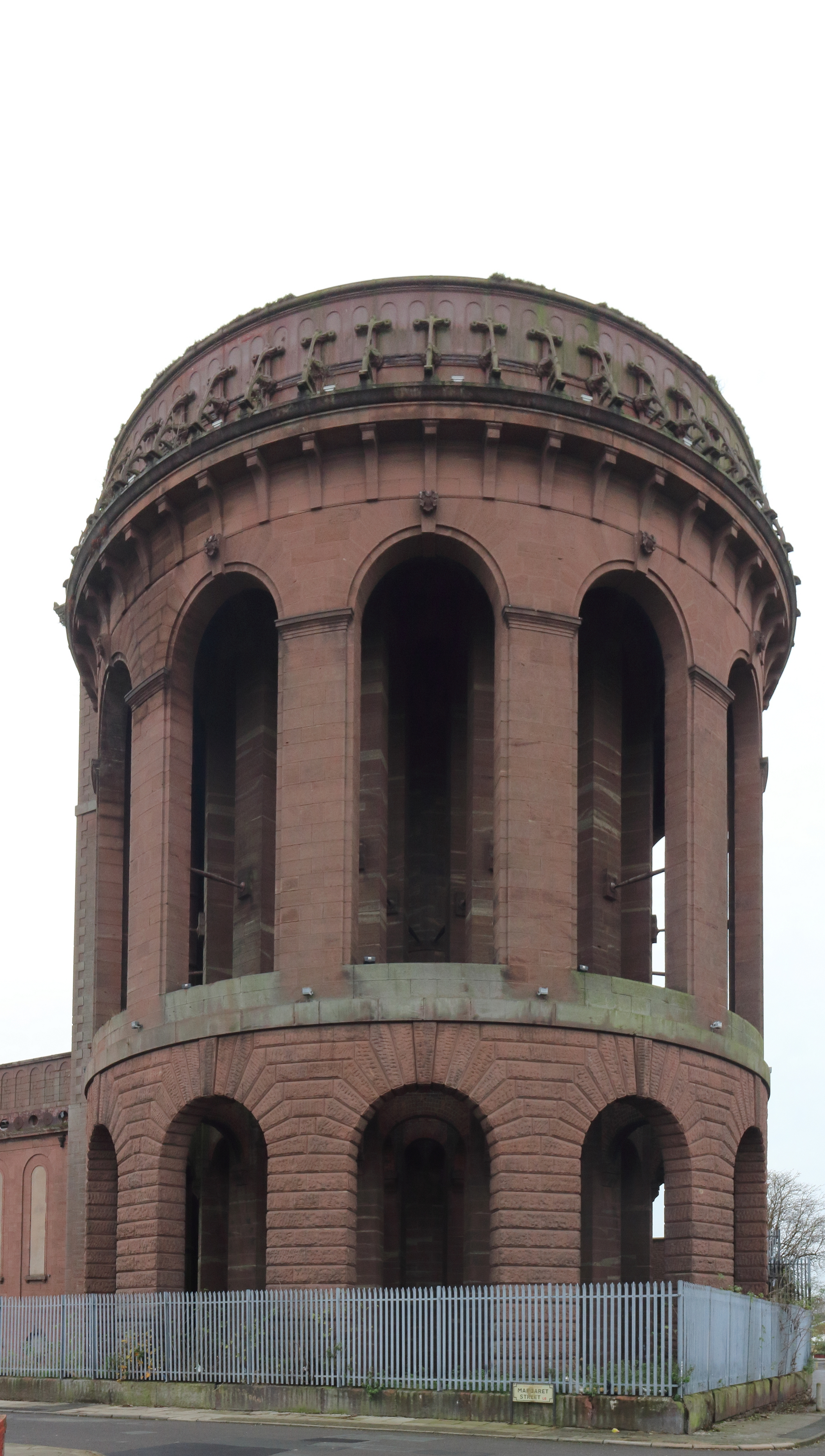
Everton water tower

- Air traffic control tower: Liverpool John Lennon Airport Control Tower – 43 m (141 ft)
- Chimney stack: Royal Liverpool University Hospital Boiler House – 67 m (220 ft)
- Church spire: Welsh Presbyterian Church – 61 m (200 ft)
- Commercial building: Royal Liver Building – 98 m (322 ft)
- Ferris wheel: Wheel of Liverpool – 60 m (200 ft)
- Government building: Queen Elizabeth II Law Courts – 58 m (190 ft)
- Hospital: Royal Liverpool University Hospital – 47 m (154 ft)
- Hotel: Meliã Hotel Liverpool (Metropolitan House; repurposed) – 73 m (240 ft)
- Industrial building: Bankfield Grain Silo – 52 m (171 ft)
- Monument: Wellington's Column – 40 m (130 ft)
- Museum / gallery: Victoria Gallery & Museum – 53 m (174 ft)
- Power station: Port of Liverpool wind farm (Canada Dock & Huskisson Dock turbines) – 125 m (410 ft)
- Radio mast: Radio City Tower – 125 m (410 ft)
- Religious building: Liverpool Cathedral – 101 m (331 ft)
- Residential building: West Tower – 140 m (460 ft)
- Stadium: Anfield – 52 m (171 ft)
- University building: James Parsons Building – 47 m (154 ft)
- Ventilation shaft: George's Dock & North John Street Ventilation Stations – 60 m (200 ft)
- Water tower: Everton water tower (decommissioned) – 26 m (85 ft)

== Tallest under construction, approved and proposed ==
Below are sub-sections for the tallest under construction, approved and proposed buildings and structures in Liverpool. Cancelled projects are not included.

Height figures are rounded to the nearest metre.

=== Under construction ===
This lists buildings that are under construction in Liverpool (over 49 m).

Name	Height		Floors	Year (est.)	Notes
Infinity Tower A	123 m	404 ft	39	Stalled.	
Infinity Tower B	105 m	344 ft	33	Stalled.	
Infinity Tower C	87 m	285 ft	27	Stalled.	
Herculaneum Quay	52 m	171 ft	16	—	
One Park Lane	50 m	158 ft	16	2024	
The Gateway	50 m	158 ft	16	2026	

=== Approved ===
This lists buildings that have been approved for, but are yet to start, construction in Liverpool (over 49 m).

Name	Height		Floors	Construction begins (est.)	Notes
No.1 King's	92 m	303 ft	28	2026	
Ovatus 1	87 m	285 ft	27	Stalled.	
Norton Point – Block A	77 m	253 ft	27	Stalled.	
The Tannery – Tower B	62 m	203 ft	19	Stalled.	
Great George Street – Block 3C	57 m	187 ft	18	—	
Norton Point – Block B	53 m	174 ft	14	Stalled.	
Norton Point – Block C	53 m	174 ft	14	Stalled.	

=== Liverpool Waters ===
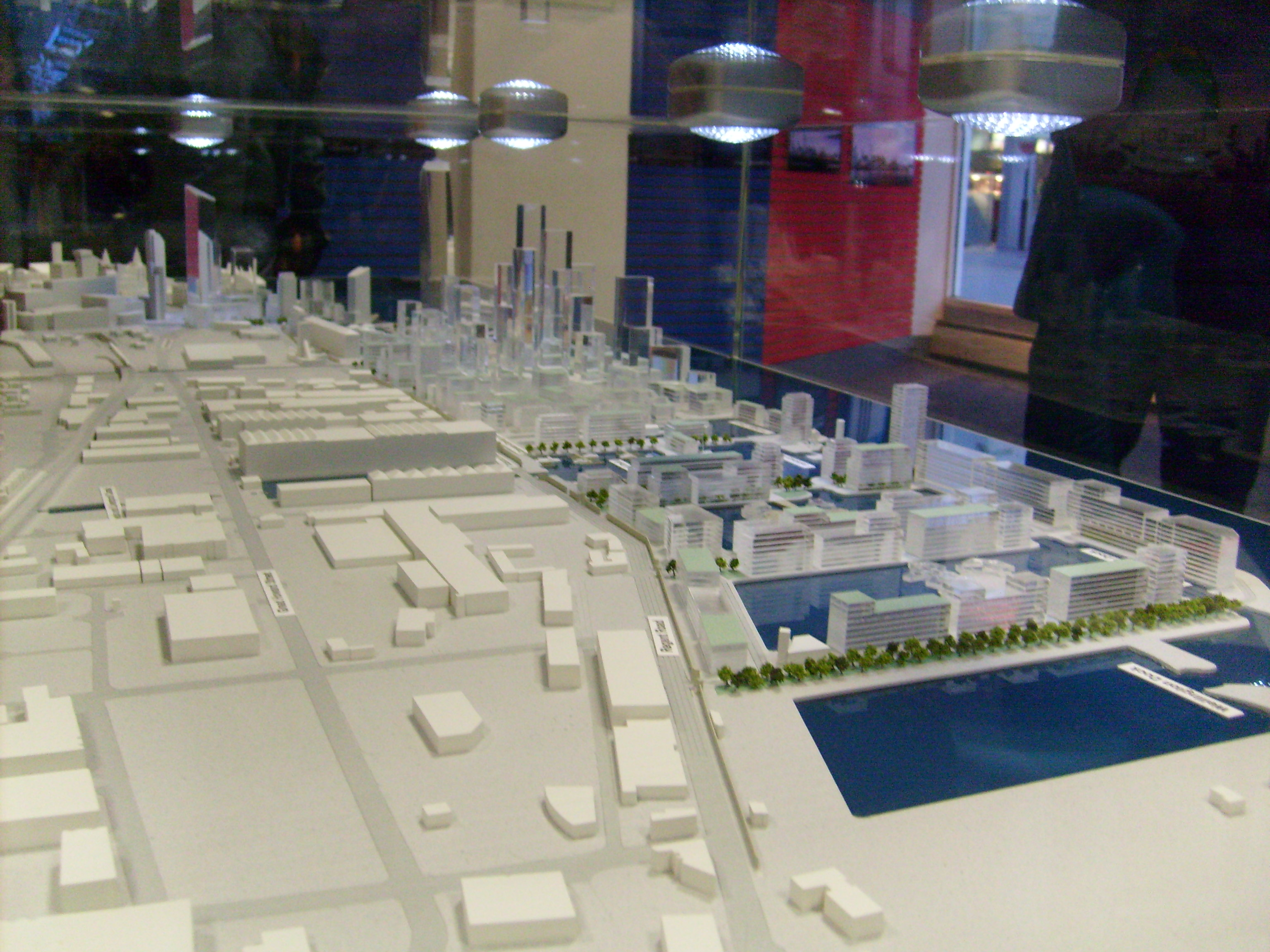
A model of the original proposal for Liverpool Waters looking south from Bramley-Moore Dock (2007).

Liverpool Waters is a large scale, £5.5bn regeneration project of the Vauxhall dockland areas of Liverpool that is currently under development by The Peel Group. A thirty year long project, the development is expected to create 21.5 million sq ft of new commercial and residential floor space and will consist of upwards of seventy buildings, with many classed as high-rise.

The project was revealed publicly in 2007. The plans, submitted to Liverpool City Council in 2010, were approved in 2012; approval was reaffirmed by the UK Government in 2013. Construction of the very first building of the scheme eventually commenced five years later in 2018; completion of the entire project is currently slated for 2041.

The original proposal included a large array of skyscrapers, compared with the likes of New York and Shanghai. However, due to concerns from, primarily, Historic England and UNESCO, regarding the impact of tall buildings to Liverpool's World Heritage Status, the plans have been revised multiple times, resulting in building heights vastly scaled down. Extensive redesigns notwithstanding, the current version of the master-plan still includes several plots of the site reserved for notable high-rises set to transform Liverpool's skyline in the next couple of decades.

Plots poised to be populated by a structure over 100 metres are listed in the table below: (Note the below heights do not refer to that of a currently proposed building. They are the maximum permitted height for any future building designed for that plot, as agreed with planning officers.)

Plot	Height		Year (latest)	Realised as...
---	231 m	758 ft	---	---
B–04	174 m	571 ft	2029	TBA
B–05	170 m	560 ft	2029	TBA
B–01	147 m	482 ft	2029	TBA
C–07 (a)	141 m	463 ft	2036	TBA
C–11	119 m	390 ft	2036	TBA
C–07 (b)	117 m	384 ft	2036	TBA
A–04	113 m	371 ft	2024	■ The Lexington (113m; 2021)
C–10	109 m	358 ft	2036	TBA
A–06	100 m	330 ft	2024	■ Patagonia Place (95m; 202x)

Key:	■	Completed /	■	Under construction /	■	Approved /	■	Proposed

== Timeline of tallest buildings and structures ==
Liverpool's skyline has been built up mostly in the last 20 years. The Royal Liver Building held the title of tallest structure in Liverpool for 54 years until Radio City Tower was completed in 1965. Radio City Tower was finally beaten in 2008 by West Tower.

Period tallest	Name	Image	Height		Floors	Coordinates	Notes
1815–1867	Church of Our Lady and St. Nicholas		53 m	174 ft	N/A	53°24′25″N 2°59′41″W	
1867–1868	Welsh Presbyterian Church		61 m	200 ft	N/A	53°23′38″N 2°57′50″W	
1868–1911	Municipal Buildings		68 m	223 ft	3	53°24′30″N 2°59′10″W	
1911–1965	Royal Liver Building		98 m	322 ft	13	53°24′21″N 2°59′45″W	
1965–2008	Radio City Tower		125 m	410 ft	N/A	53°24′23″N 2°58′55″W	
2008–present	West Tower		134 m	440 ft	40	53°24′36″N 2°59′48″W	

== Tallest buildings in the Liverpool Urban Area ==
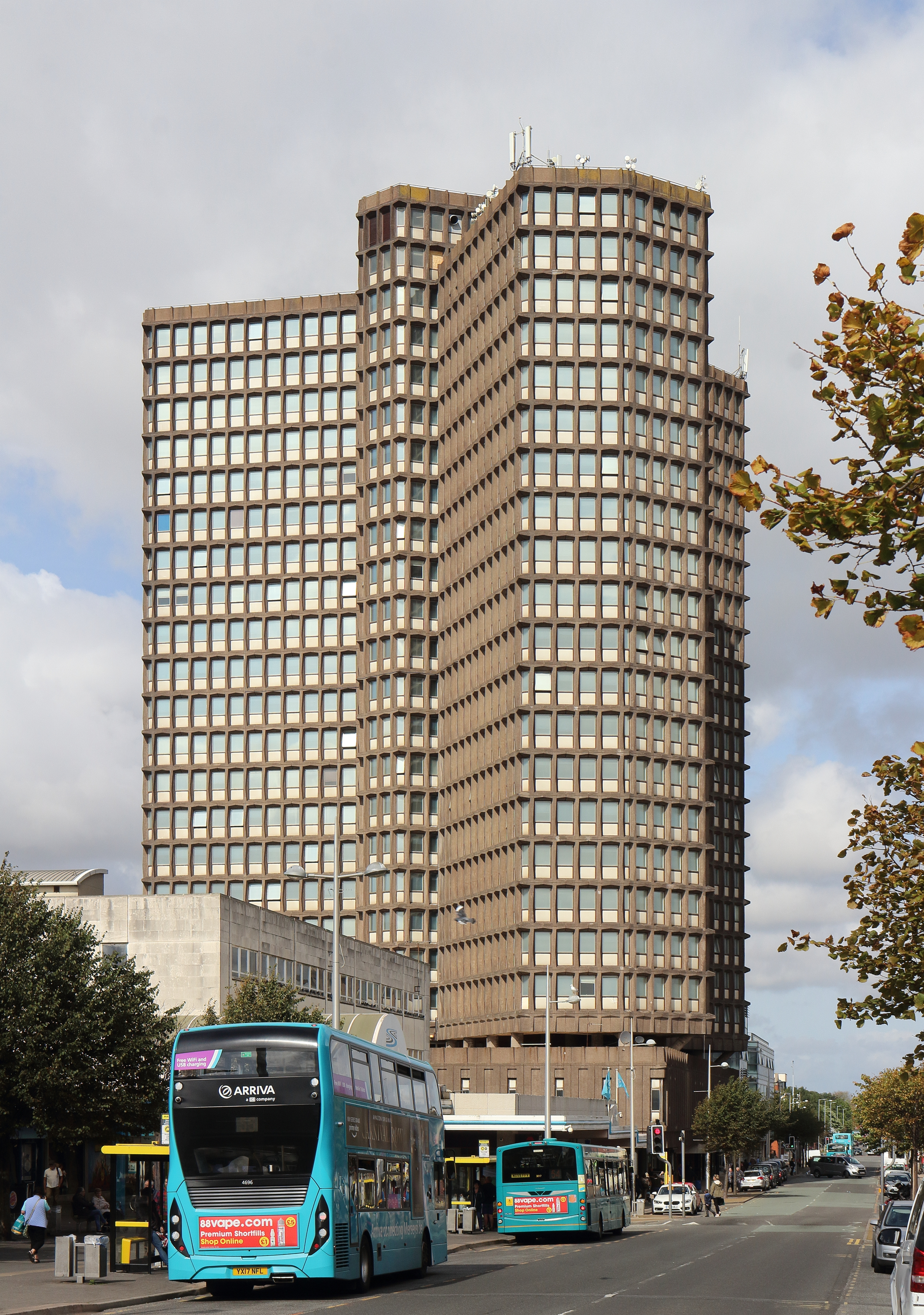
The Triad in Bootle is the tallest building in urban Liverpool outside the city centre

The list below contains the tallest buildings in the Liverpool Urban Area and the Wirral. This term is used by the Office for National Statistics (ONS) to denote the urban area around Liverpool. Structures are not included in the below list although the tallest free-standing structures are the multiple ship-to-shore cranes of the Liverpool2 container port in Seaforth which measure 92m in height and 132m when raised.

Rank	Name	Area	Height		Floors	Year	Notes
Rank	Name	Area	m	ft	Floors	Year	Notes
1	The Triad	Bootle	89	292	23	1974	
2	Strand House	Bootle	62	203	22	1968	
3=	The Cliff 1	Wallasey	52	171	17	1962	
3=	The Cliff 2	Wallasey	52	171	17	1962	
5	Stella Nova	Bootle	51	167	15	2009	
6=	Salisbury House	Bootle	49	161	15	1968	
6=	Daniel House	Bootle	49	161	15		
8=	St Martins House	Bootle	46	151	13		
8=	Oxford House	Bootle	46	151	16	1968	
8=	Stanley House	Bootle	46	151	16	1968	
8=	Mersey House	Bootle	46	151	16	1968	
8=	Irlam House	Bootle	46	151	16	1968	
8=	Alexander House	Seaforth	46	151	18		
8=	Willow House	Seaforth	46	151	15		
8=	Dean House	Waterloo	46	151	15		
8=	Chapel House	Waterloo	46	151	15		
8=	Vine House	Seaforth	46	151	15		

== Gallery ==
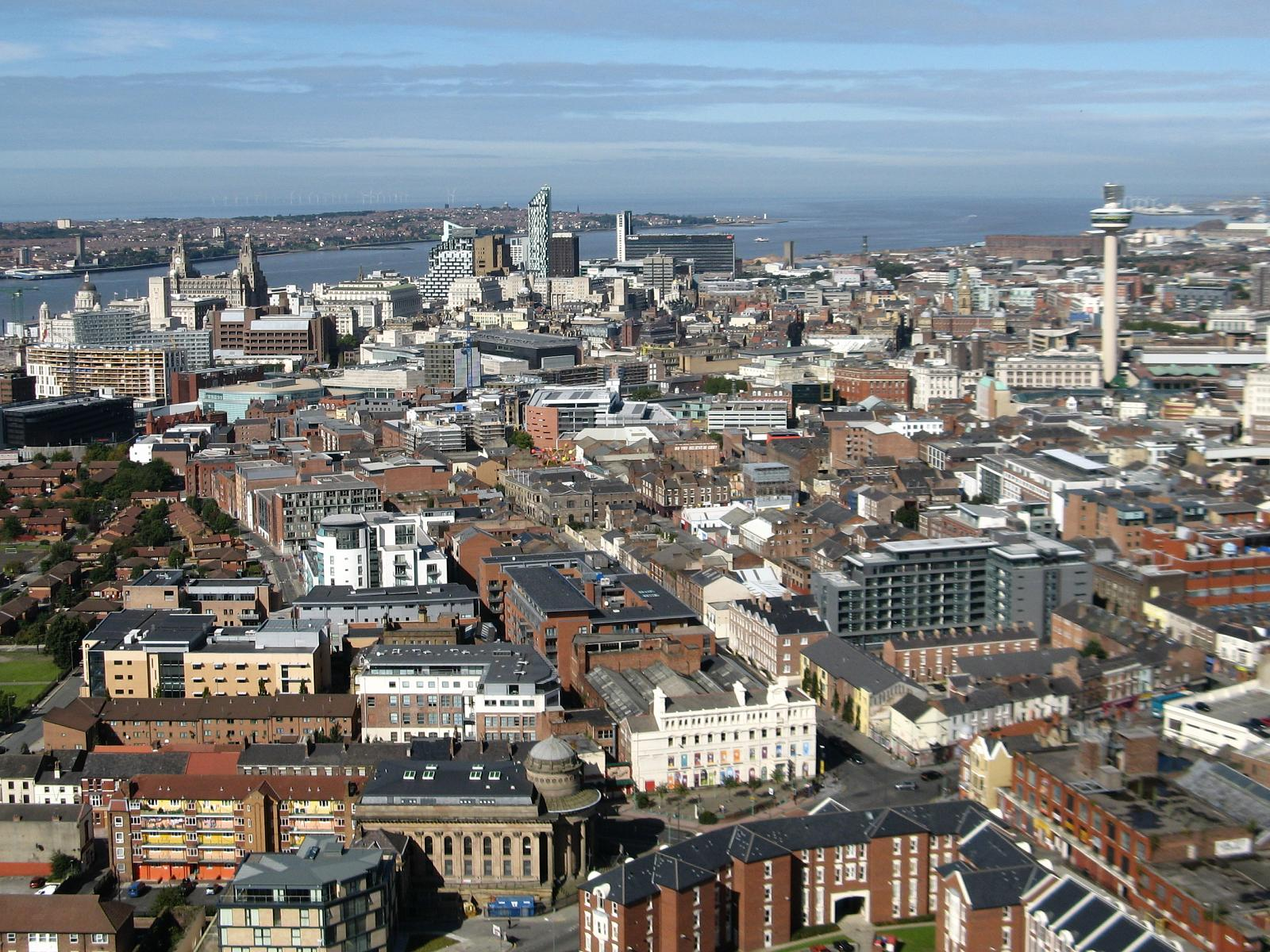
Liverpool city centre in late-2008 viewed from Liverpool Cathedral; the financial district and historic waterfront can be seen to the left, whilst the most prominent structure to the right is St. John's Beacon

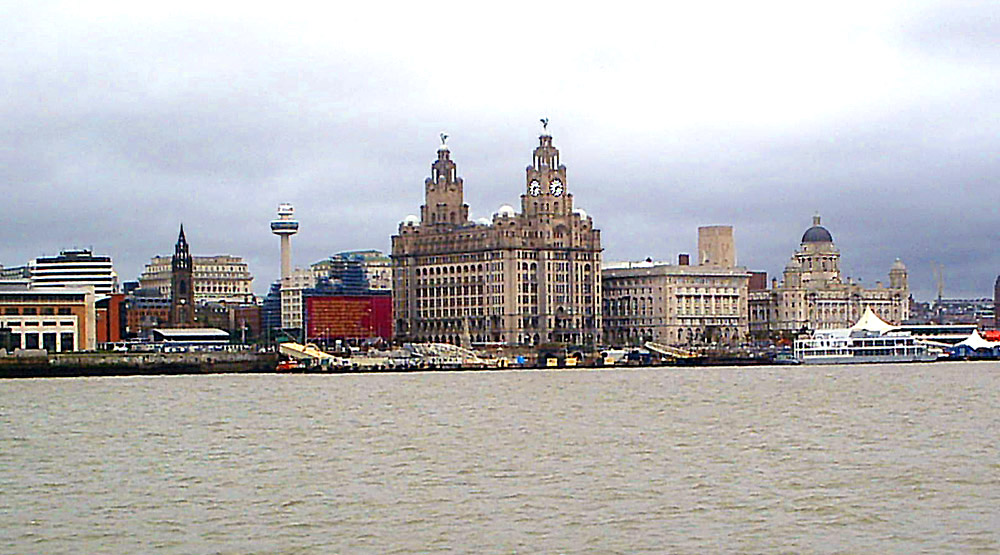
Liverpool's historic cityscape viewed from across the Mersey

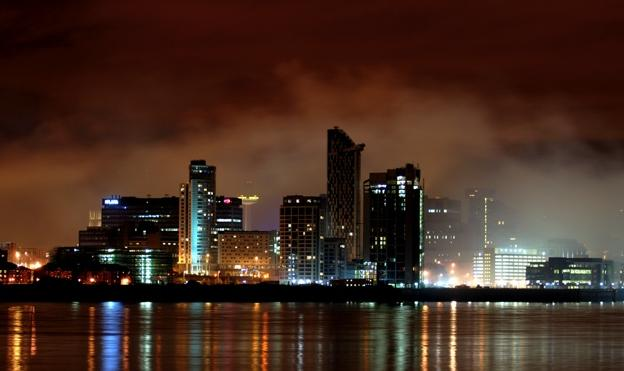
Liverpool's ever changing skyline can be seen most obviously in the city's new financial district
