= Spine =

Spine or spinal may refer to:

== Science ==
=== Biology ===
- Spinal column, also known as the backbone
- Dendritic spine, a small membranous protrusion from a neuron's dendrite
- Thorns, spines, and prickles, needle-like structures in plants
- Spine (zoology), needle-like structures in animals
- SPINE (molecular biology) (strep–protein interaction experiment), a method for the detection of protein interactions

=== Medicine ===
- Spinal anaesthesia or "a spinal", an injection generally through a fine needle, usually long
- The Spine, a set of national service within the UK NHS Connecting for Health

== Arts, entertainment and media ==
- The Spine (album), a 2004 They Might Be Giants album, including the songs "Spine" and "Spines"
- Spine (film), American film
- The Spine (film), a 2009 animated short by Chris Landreth
- Spine (video game), an upcoming video game
- The Spine, a novel by Ladislav Bublík
- Spinal Column (sculpture), a 1968 sculpture by Alexander Calder
- The Spine, Liverpool, a 14-storey building in Liverpool, England

=== Fictional entities ===
- Spinal (Killer Instinct), a fictional character from the video game Killer Instinct
- Spine, a demon in Blood Beast (2007) book of the Demonata saga
- The Spine, the fictional mountain chain which follows the west coast in The Inheritance Cycle
- The Spine, a singing automaton in the band Steam Powered Giraffe, portrayed by David Michael Bennett

=== Periodicals ===
- Spine (journal), a bi-weekly peer-reviewed journal of spine surgery, publish by Lippincott
- The Spine Journal, bi-monthly peer-reviewed journal, published by Elsevier

== Other uses ==
- Spine (bookbinding), the closed edge of a book along which the pages are bound
- Spine, a measure of stiffness of an arrow shaft in archery

== See also ==
- Anterior inferior iliac spine (AIIS), anterior superior iliac spine (ASIS), posterior inferior iliac spine, and posterior superior iliac spine
- Ischial spine, part of the posterior border of the body of the ischium bone of the pelvis
- Mental spine, on the mandible
- Anterior nasal spine, a bony projection in the skull
- Posterior nasal spine, for the attachment of the musculus uvulae
- Spine of scapula, a prominent plate of bone
- Spine of sphenoid bone (spina angulari) and ethmoidal spine
