= Unity Buildings =

Office and residential buildings in Liverpool, England

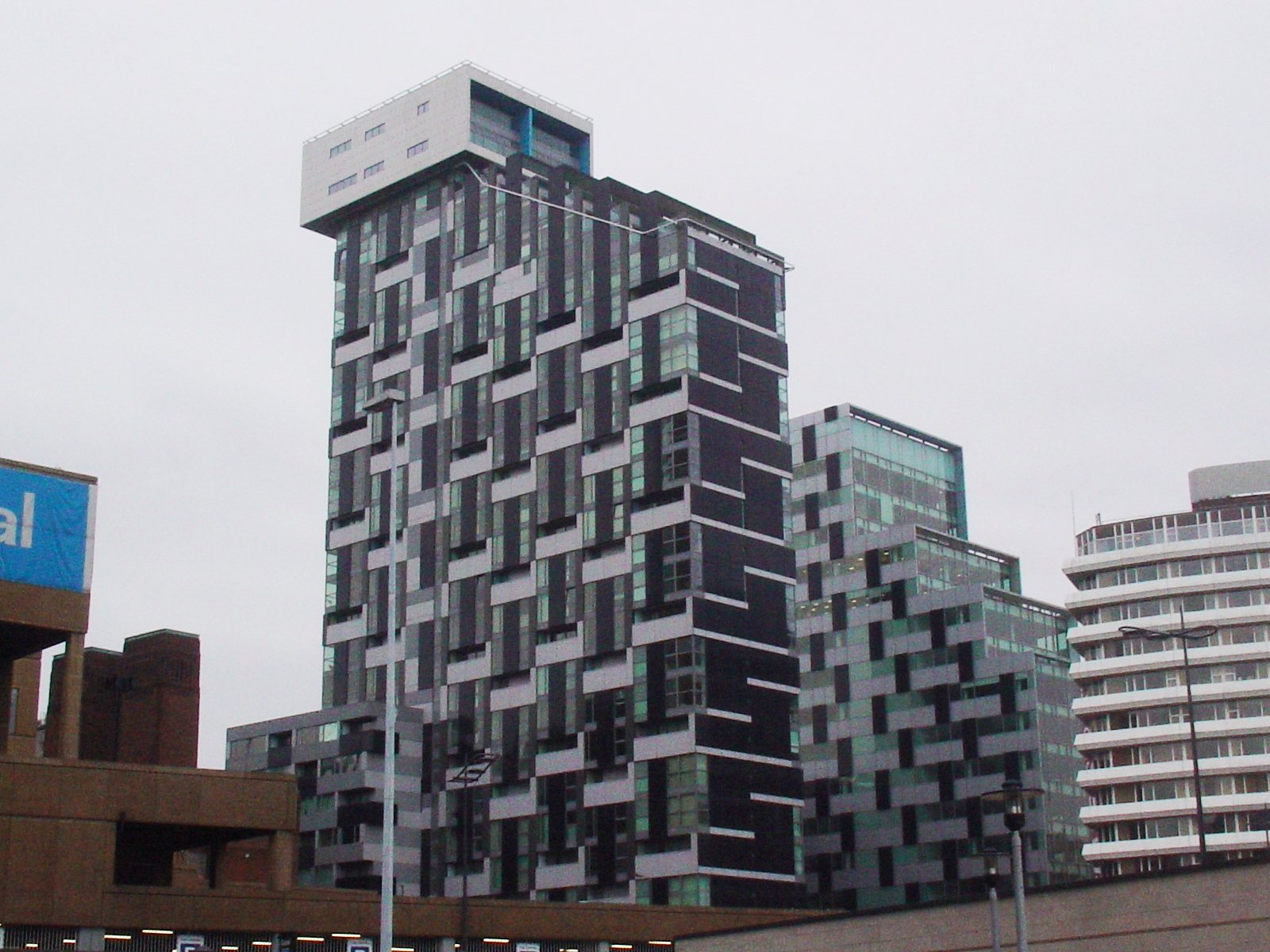
- Interactive map of the Unity Buildings area

General information
- Type: Mixed use
- Location: Liverpool, England, United Kingdom
- Coordinates: 53.4078°N 2.9947°W
- Construction started: 2004
- Completed: 2007

Height
- Roof: 86 metres (282 ft)

Technical details
- Floor count: 27 and 16

Design and construction
- Architect: Allford Hall Monaghan Morris

The Unity Buildings in Liverpool, England consist of the 86 m (282 ft) tall Unity Residential and 64 m (210 ft) Unity Commercial. They are respectively 27 and 16 storeys tall and the city's eighth and thirteenth tallest buildings (although typically speaking, the towers are one entity as they are both connected to one another). The buildings are located immediately within Liverpool city centre on Chapel Street and were completed in 2007. As the names suggest, the taller of the two towers consists primarily of flats and residential units, whilst the smaller tower is primarily office space. The residential tower contains 162 residential units of mainly two and three bedroom duplex apartments, as well as a residents' gym and underground parking. Prior to the construction of the Unity Buildings, another project was tipped for development on the same site. The 145 metres (476 ft) 40 storey building was to be called 'Capital Exchange', however it was scrapped in favour of the Unity Buildings.

== Awards ==
The Unity Buildings alongside Palestra in London won the Royal Institute of British Architects' annual tall buildings awards in 2007, the RIBA described the towers as follows: "arrangement minimises any interruption to views of the Mersey and allows Unity, with its Dazzle Camouflage patterns."

== Gallery ==
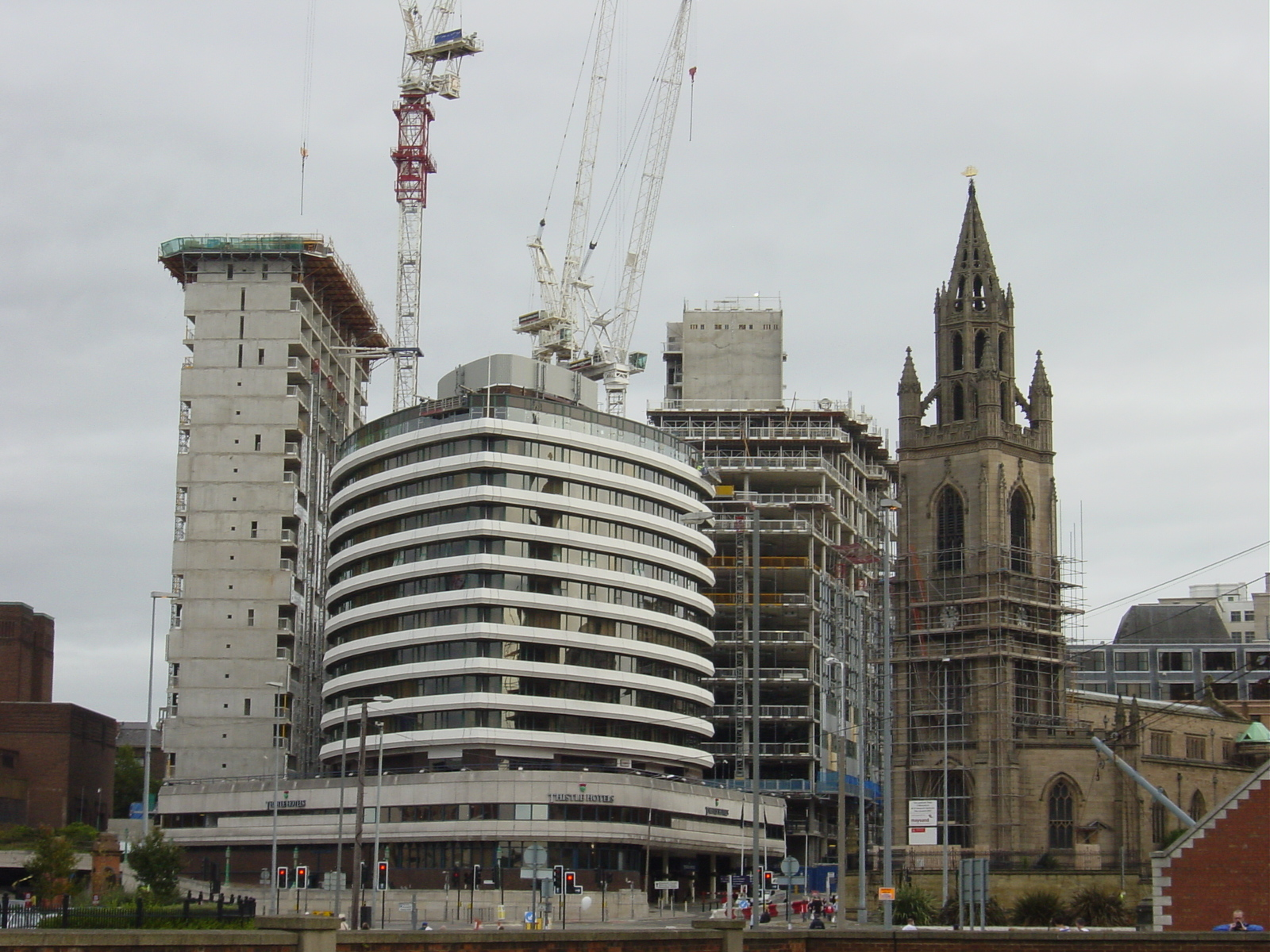
Under construction in 2005

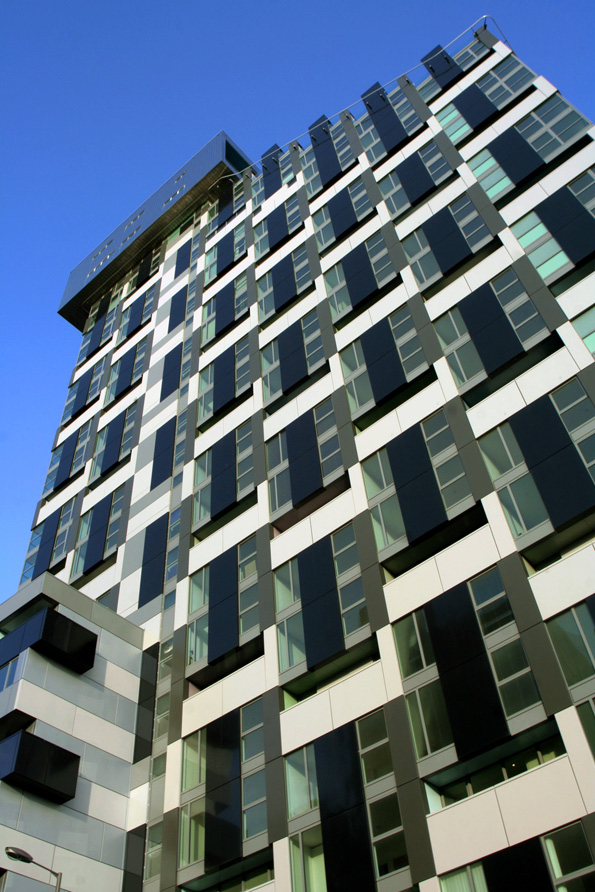
A close up and detail of the Unity Residential building

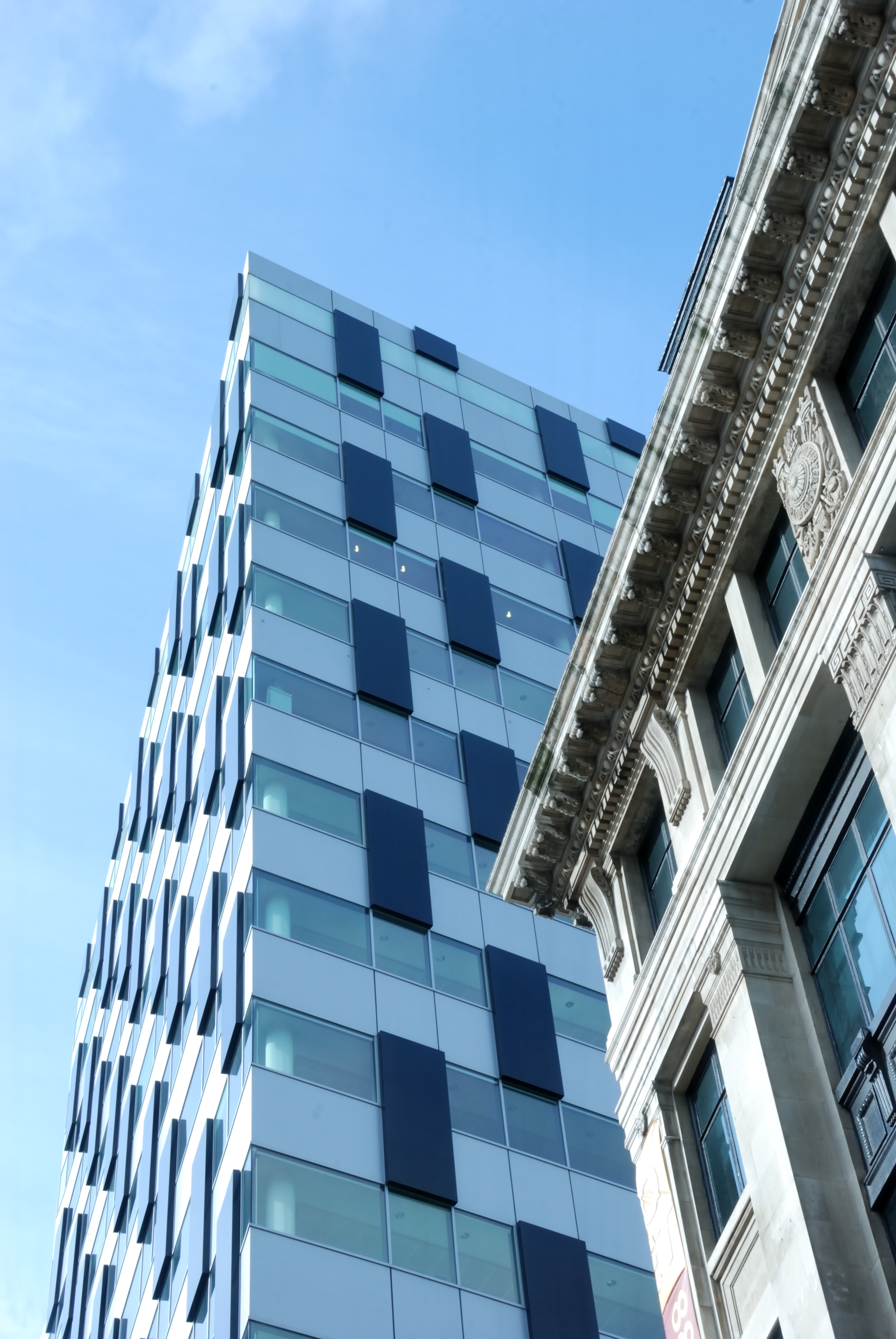
A close up and detail of the Unity Commercial building

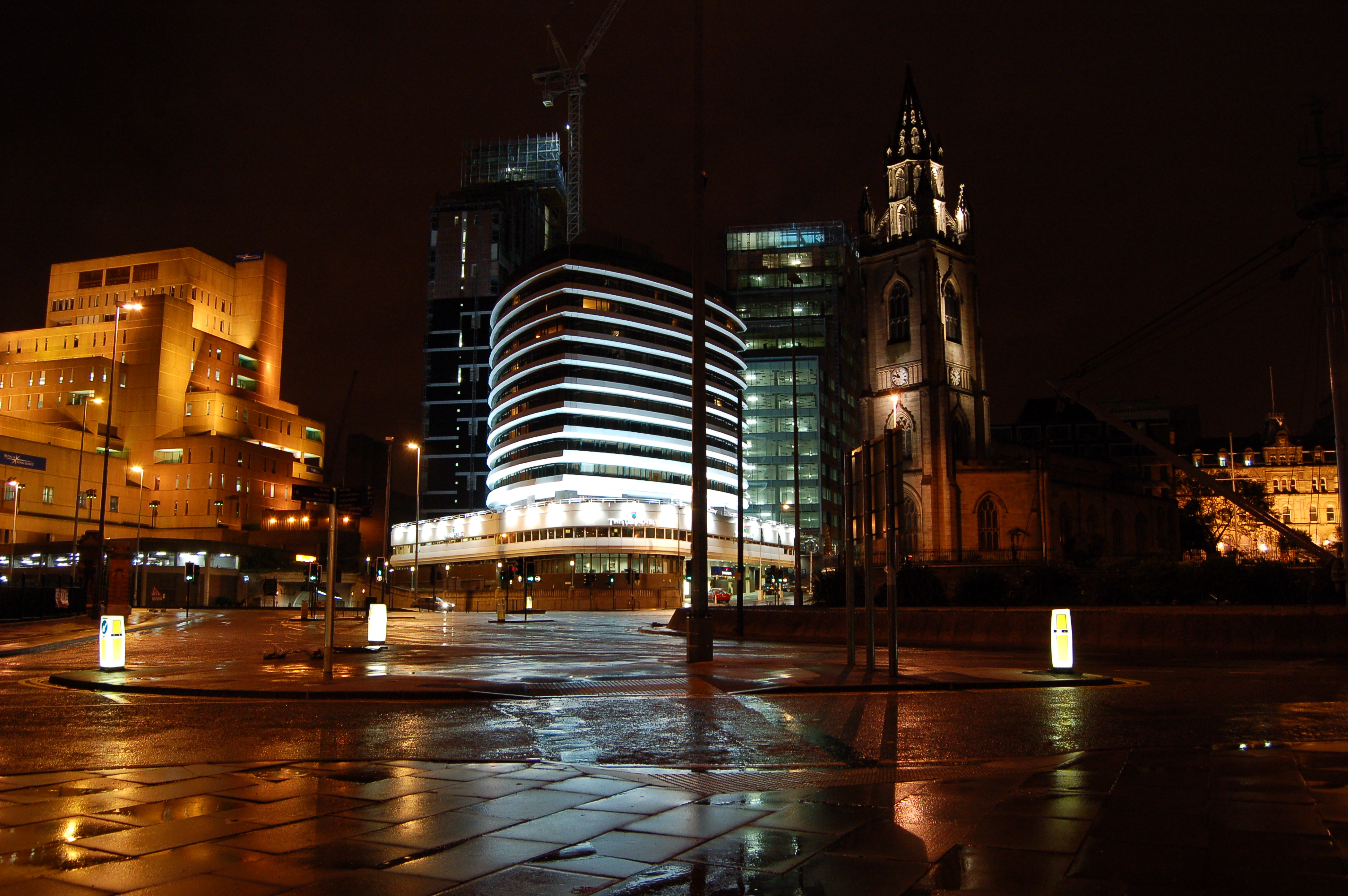
Unity Residential and Commercial seen to the left and right behind Atlantic Tower

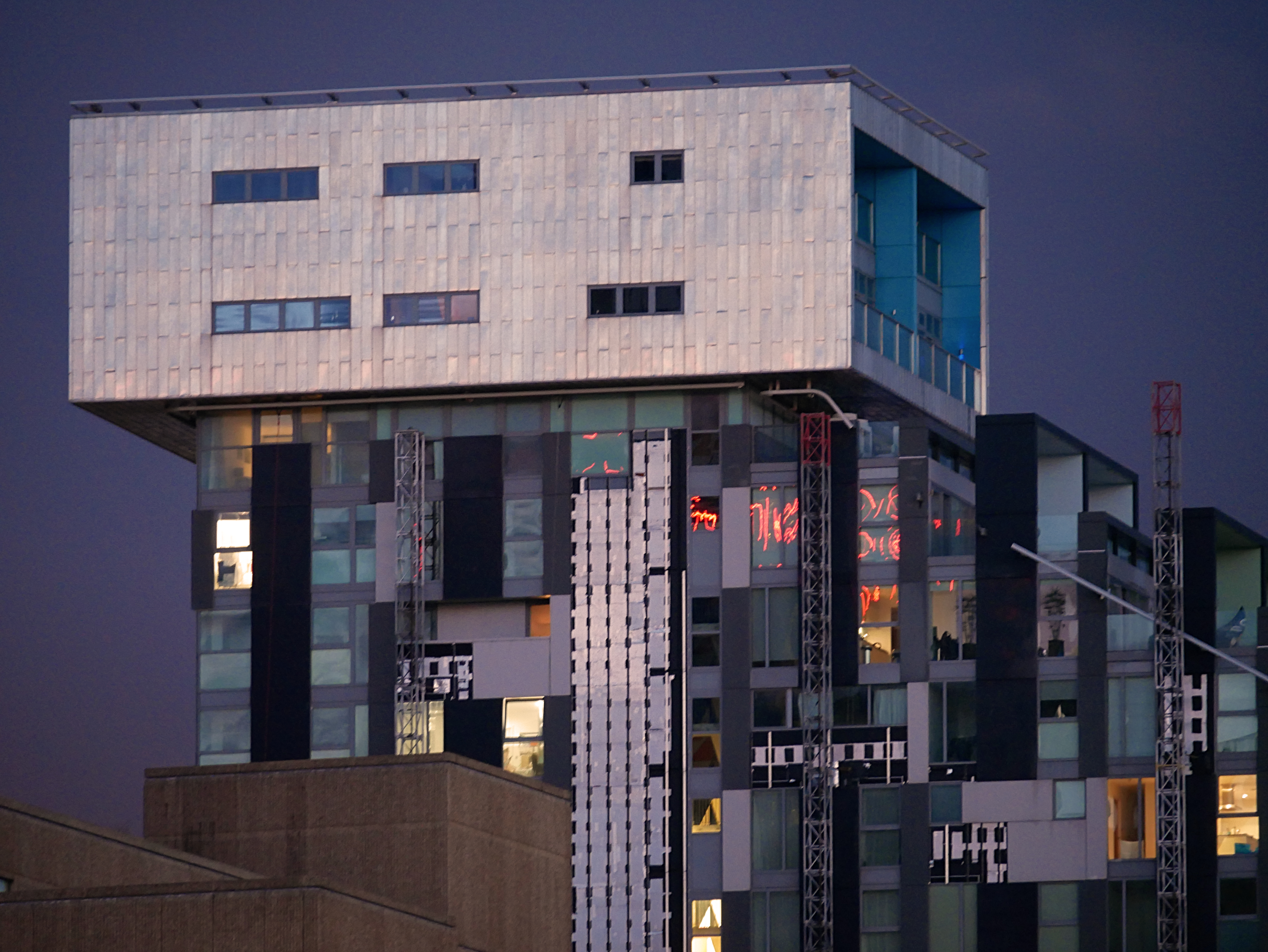
Unity Residential

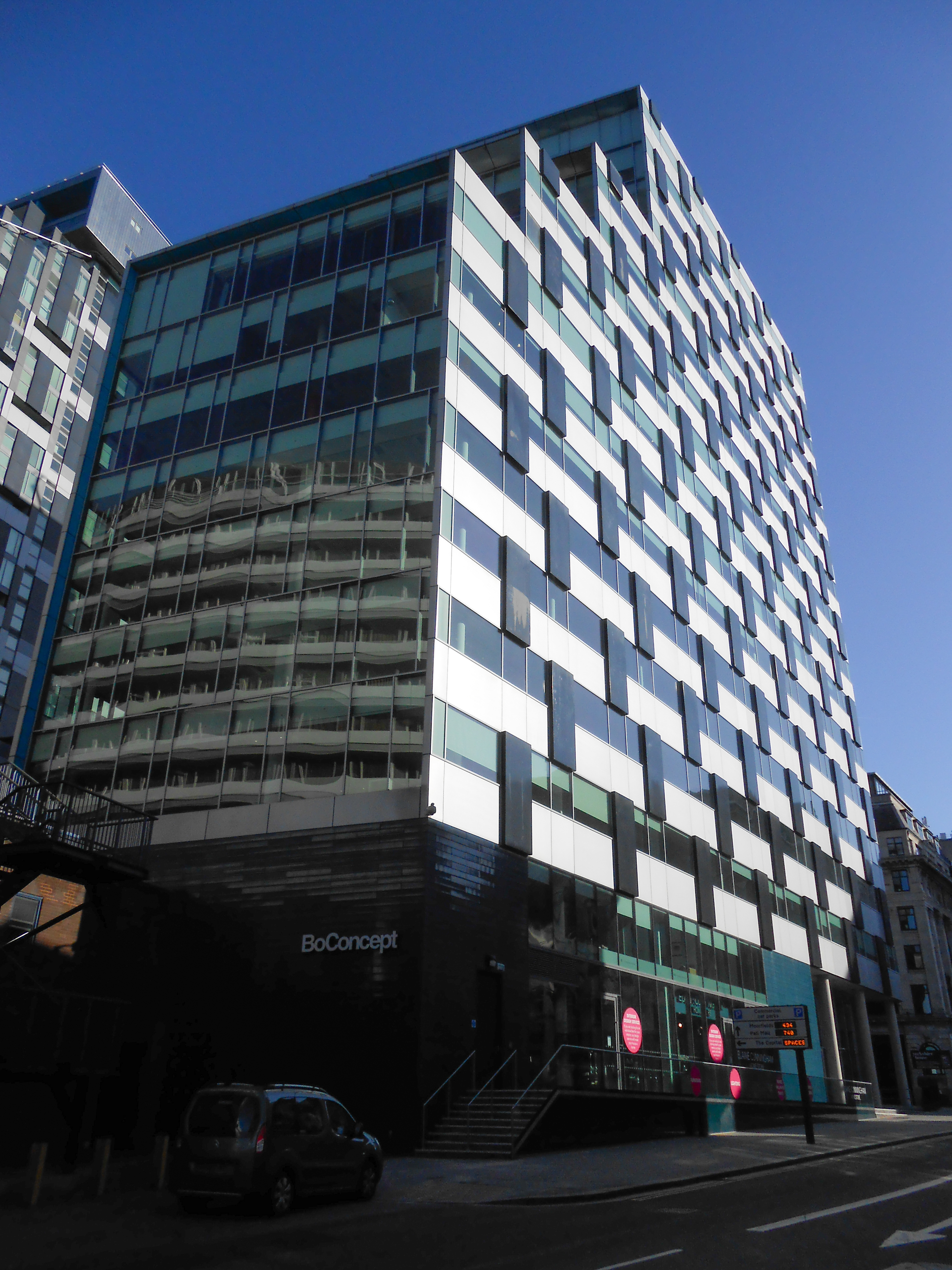
Unity Commercial
