= The Lexington (Liverpool) =

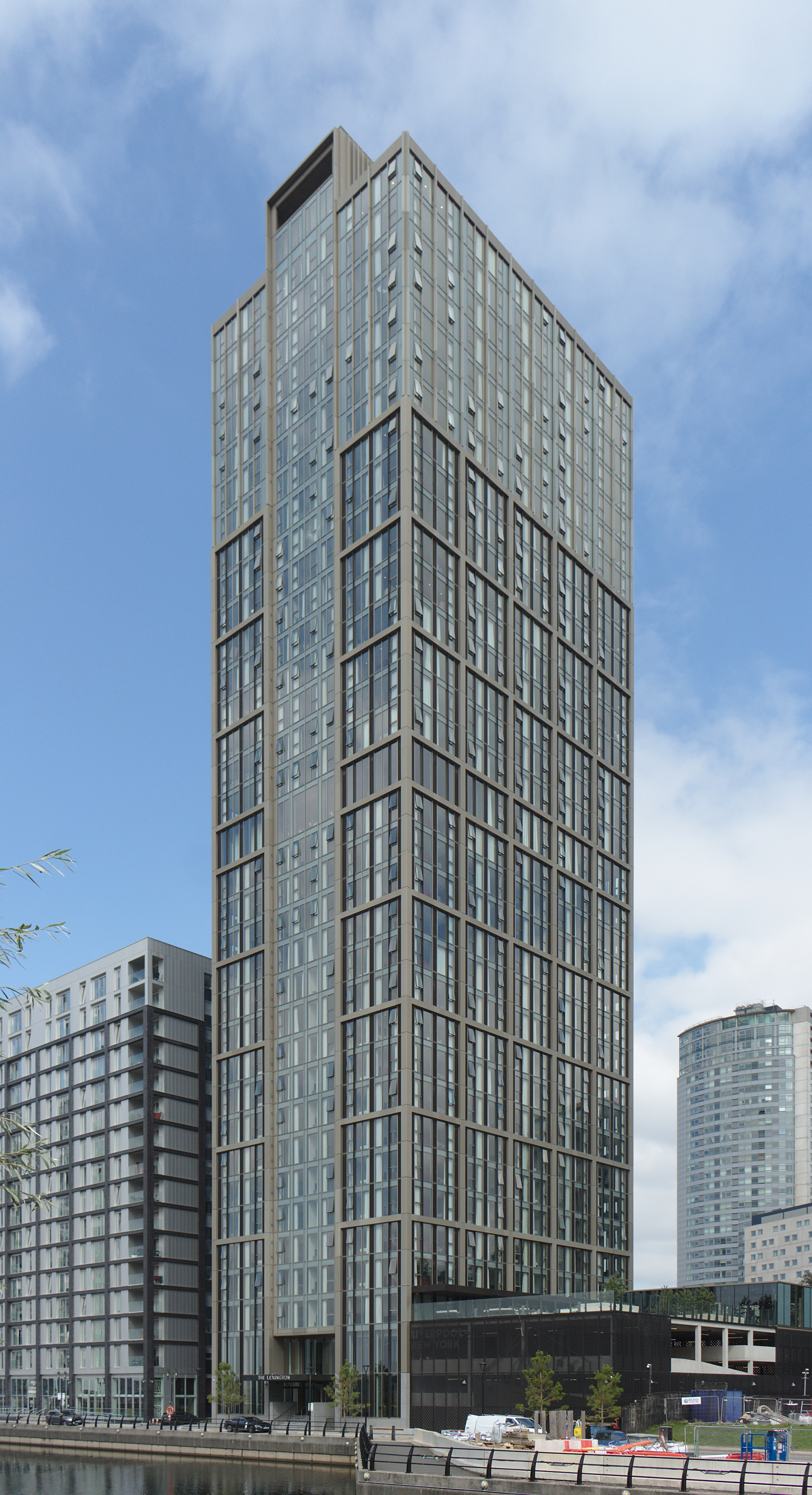
- The Lexington in September 2021.
- Interactive map of the The Lexington area

General information
- Status: Completed
- Type: Residential
- Architectural style: International
- Location: Liverpool, England
- Coordinates: 53.4100463°N 2.9986001°W
- Construction started: November 2018
- Topped-out: August 2020
- Completed: September 2021
- Cost: £90,000,000

Height
- Roof: 112.5 m (369 ft)

Technical details
- Floor count: 35
- Floor area: 27,430 m^{2} (295,300 sq ft)

Design and construction
- Architect: Falconer Chester Hall
- Developer: MODA
- Main contractor: Beijing Construction Engineering Group

The Lexington is a 35-storey residential building at Princes Dock in Liverpool, England. Part of the larger Liverpool Waters re-generation project, it was completed in September 2021. Estimated to cost £90 million, the "New York style" building includes 325 apartments, a sky lounge, gym and rooftop garden. Upon completion, it became the third tallest building in Liverpool at 112.5 m (369 ft).

== Timeline ==
In 2015, Peel Holdings (owners of Prince's Dock) and developers MODA Living, agreed a deal for the latter to build a 40-storey residential tower at the site, as part of the Liverpool Waters development. It was to be known as "Princes Reach".

In April 2016, the design proposal, by architects Falconer Chester Hall, was revealed, now as a 34-storey building comprising 304 residential units; a public exhibition was held. In September, planning permission was granted, with the scheme now under the name of "The Lexington". However, in July 2017, amendments to the approved plans were submitted, most notably proposing to add an extra storey and an additional 21 units, raising the building height from 109 m to 112.5 m. These changes were approved in February 2018.

Chinese construction firm Beijing Construction Engineering Group (BCEG) were subsequently selected as the main contractor. Construction ultimately began in November 2018. The tower topped out in August 2020, and was declared complete in September 2021.

== Design ==
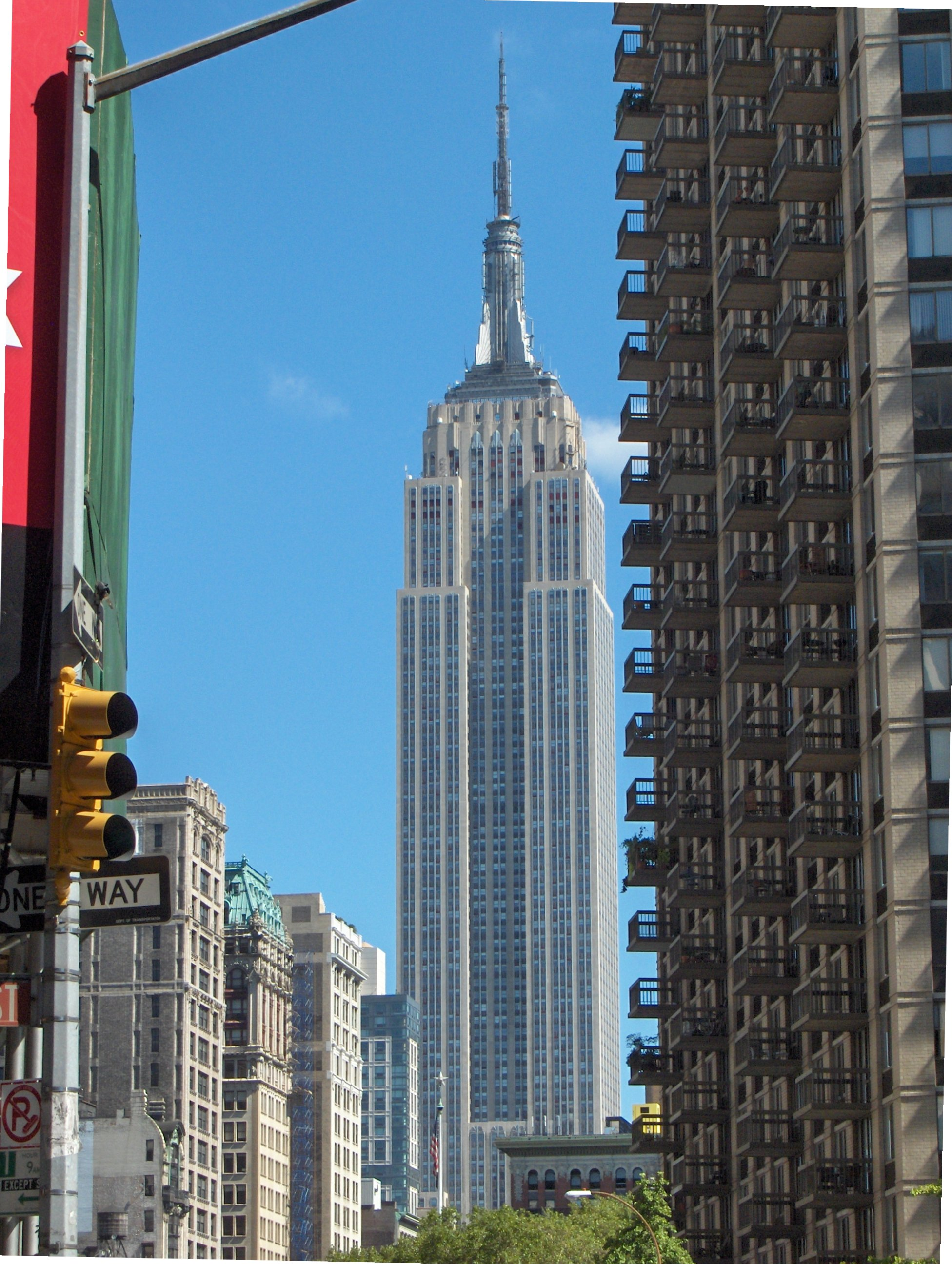
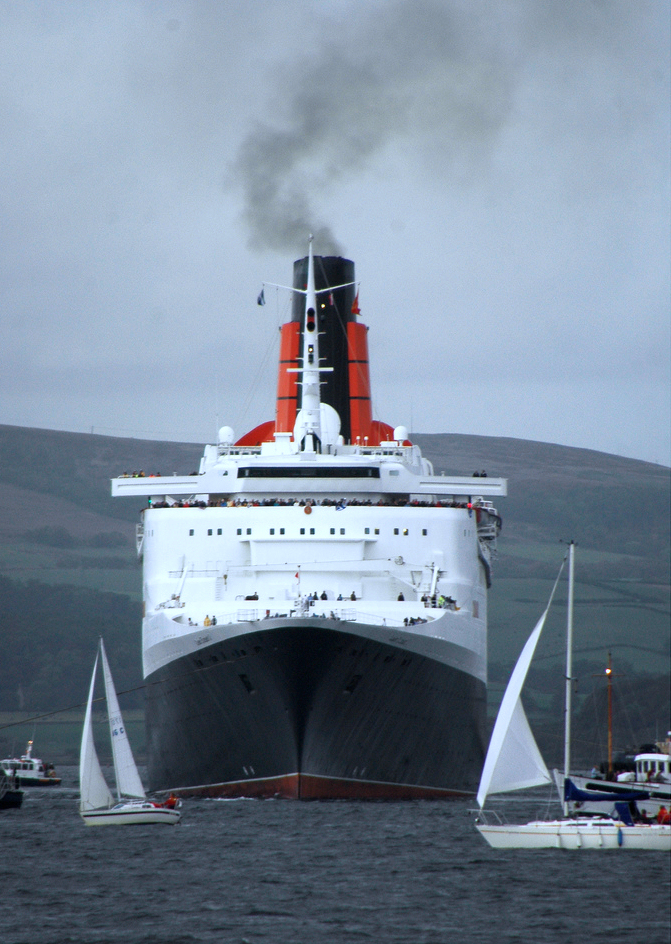
The shape of the Empire State Building and a Cunard Cruise Liner influenced the design.

The design was inspired by the historic transatlantic ties between Liverpool and New York City. In recognition of this legacy, the emerging vision for the project was to create a building "paying homage to the slim stylish skyscrapers of New York."

Buildings from both cities influenced the form of The Lexington; elevations of the Empire State Building, Rockefeller Center and Liver Building as well as an old, iconic transportation link between the cities, a Cunard Cruise Liner, all contributed towards the architectural approach. The proportionality and elegance of the Empire State Building was considered particularly appealing.

The architects' main observation was the commonality of a protrusion or "beacon" arising from the top and middle of the main body of each elevation referenced. Thus it was decided such a feature would be the main design element of The Lexington, including a specific "lighting strategy" to "accentuate the presence of the beacon".

The New York based modernist works of Mies van der Rohe, such as Lever House and the Seagram Building were also studied to determine the attributes needed for The Lexington to successfully echo the city's high-rises.

Conclusions included the need for strong vertical lines in order to accentuate the elegance and slenderness of The Lexington, with a much weaker emphasis on horizontal elements. An "unfussy form" was also seen necessary to stress the building's verticality. Consequently, it was decided to use an aesthetic illusion to emphasise The Lexington's slimness by splitting the building, visually, into three distinct, narrower vertical sections with articulation of the bounding edges.

New York influences also contributed to the final Americanised name for the building.

Internally, the residential units are a mix of studio, 1 bedroom, 2 bedroom and 3 bedroom apartments. The main building is abutted by a car park which is topped by a roof terrace, forming part of the 15,000 sq ft of amenity space; also included is a gym, cinema room, 17th floor sky lounge, community dining and kitchen, cycle parking, and work space.

== Gallery ==
Under construction:

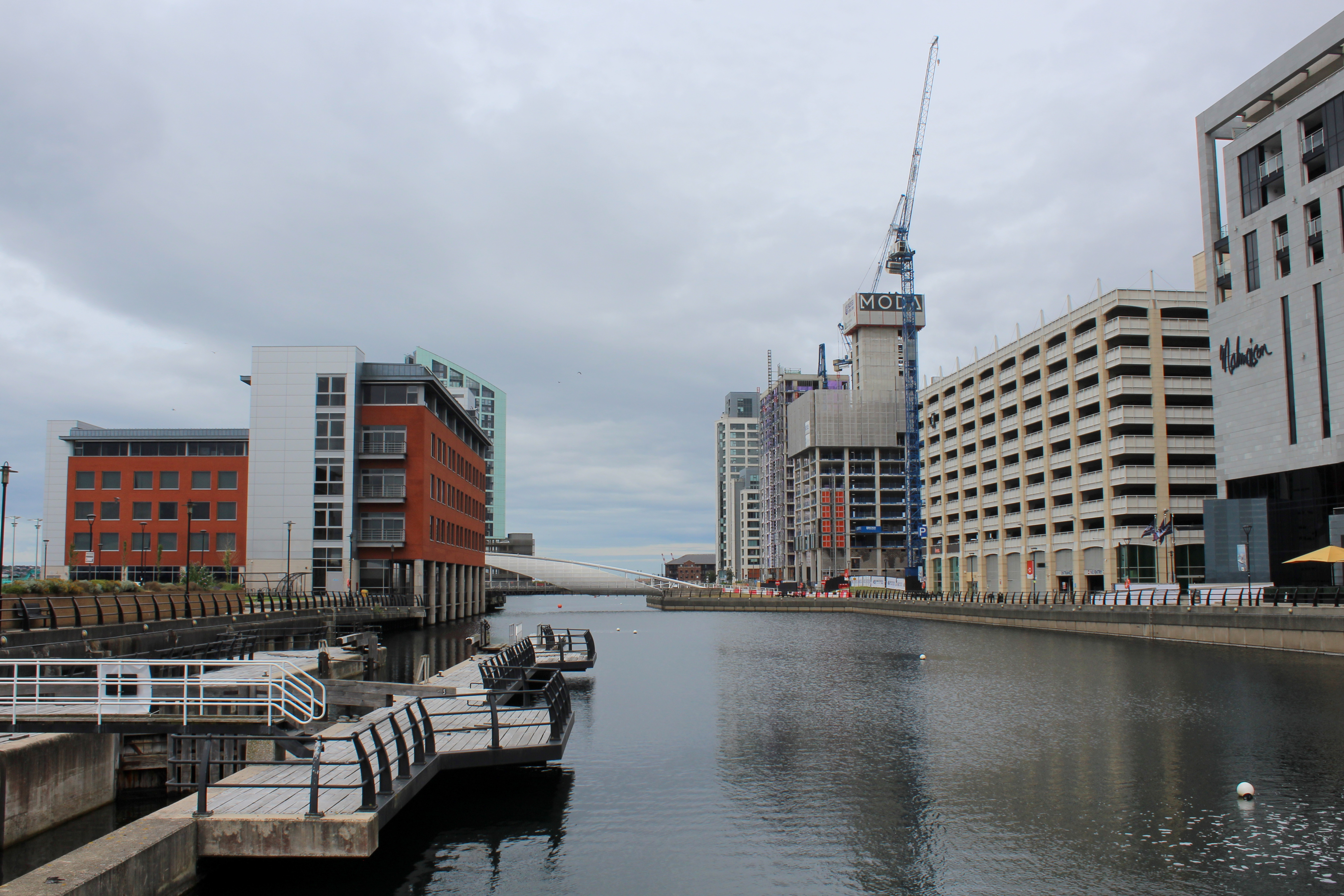
July 2019

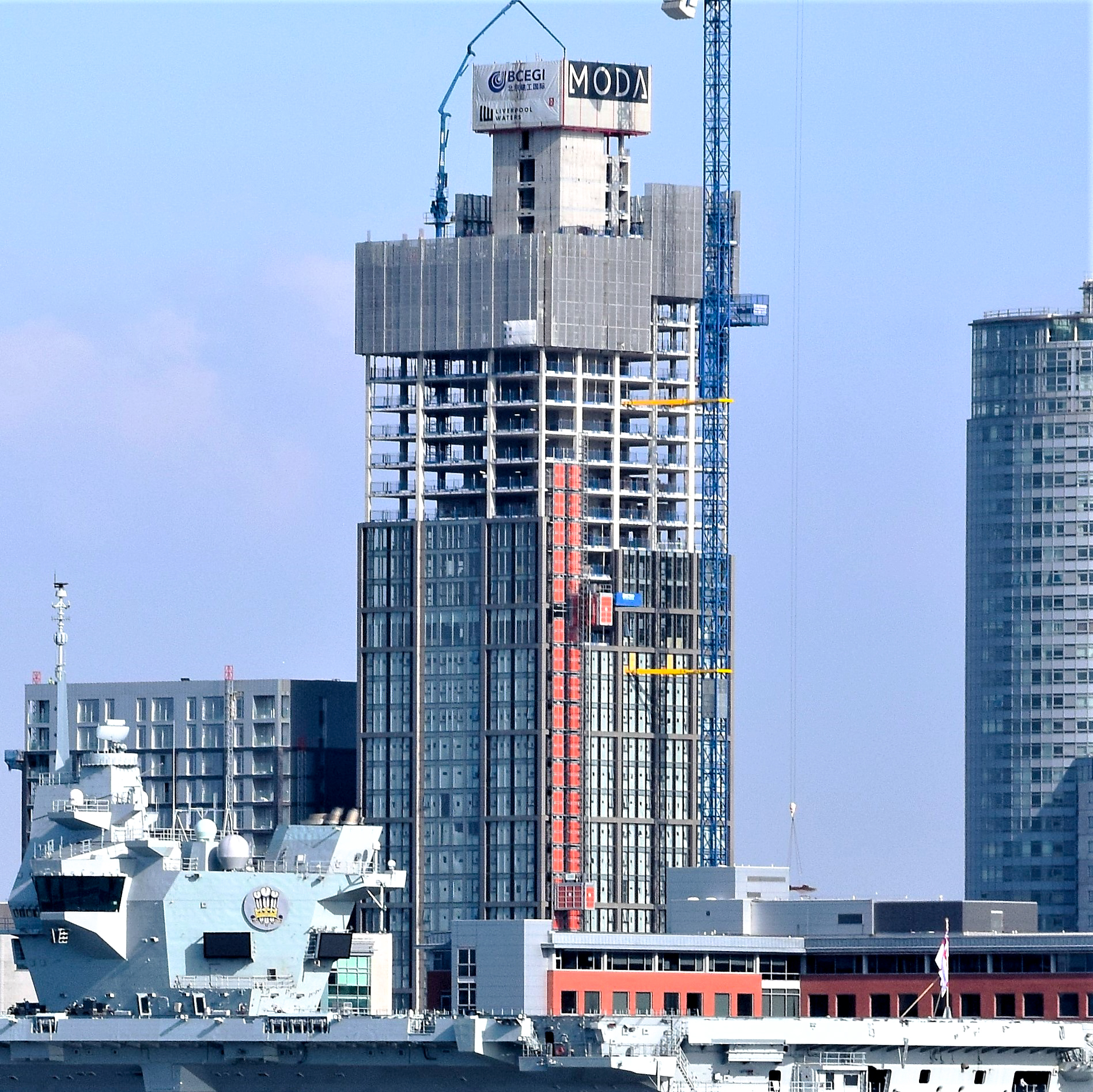
March 2020

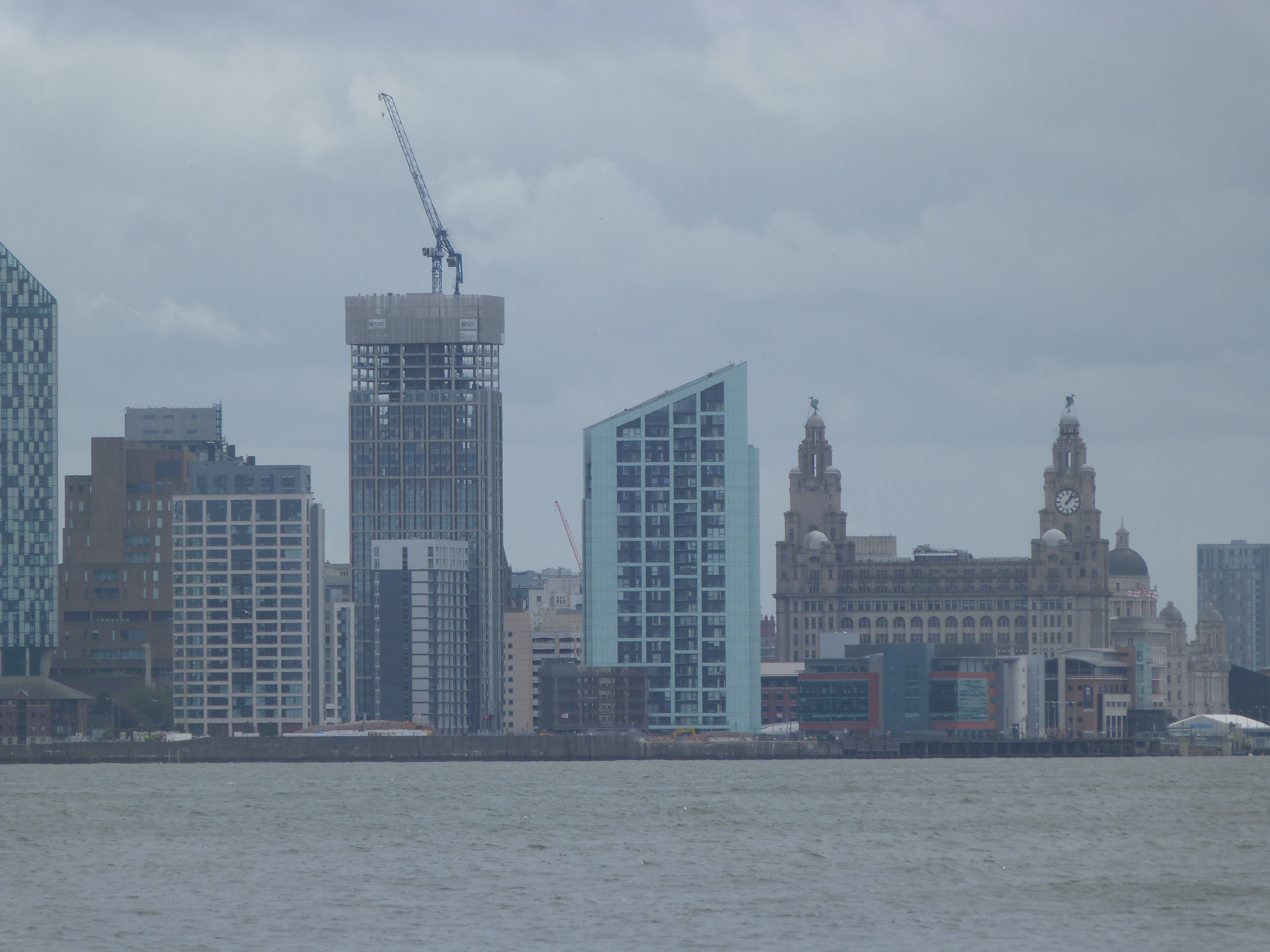
June 2020

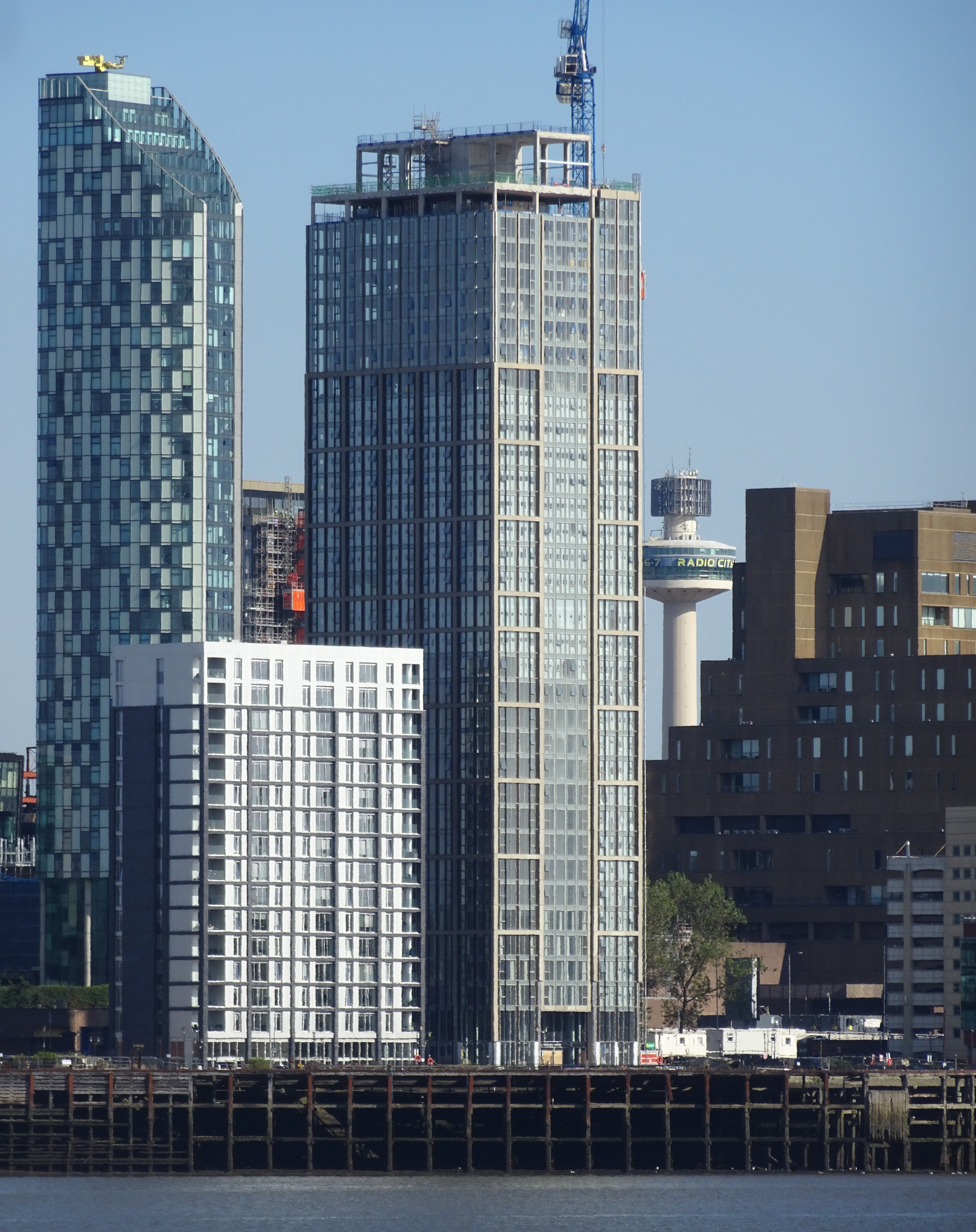
September 2020

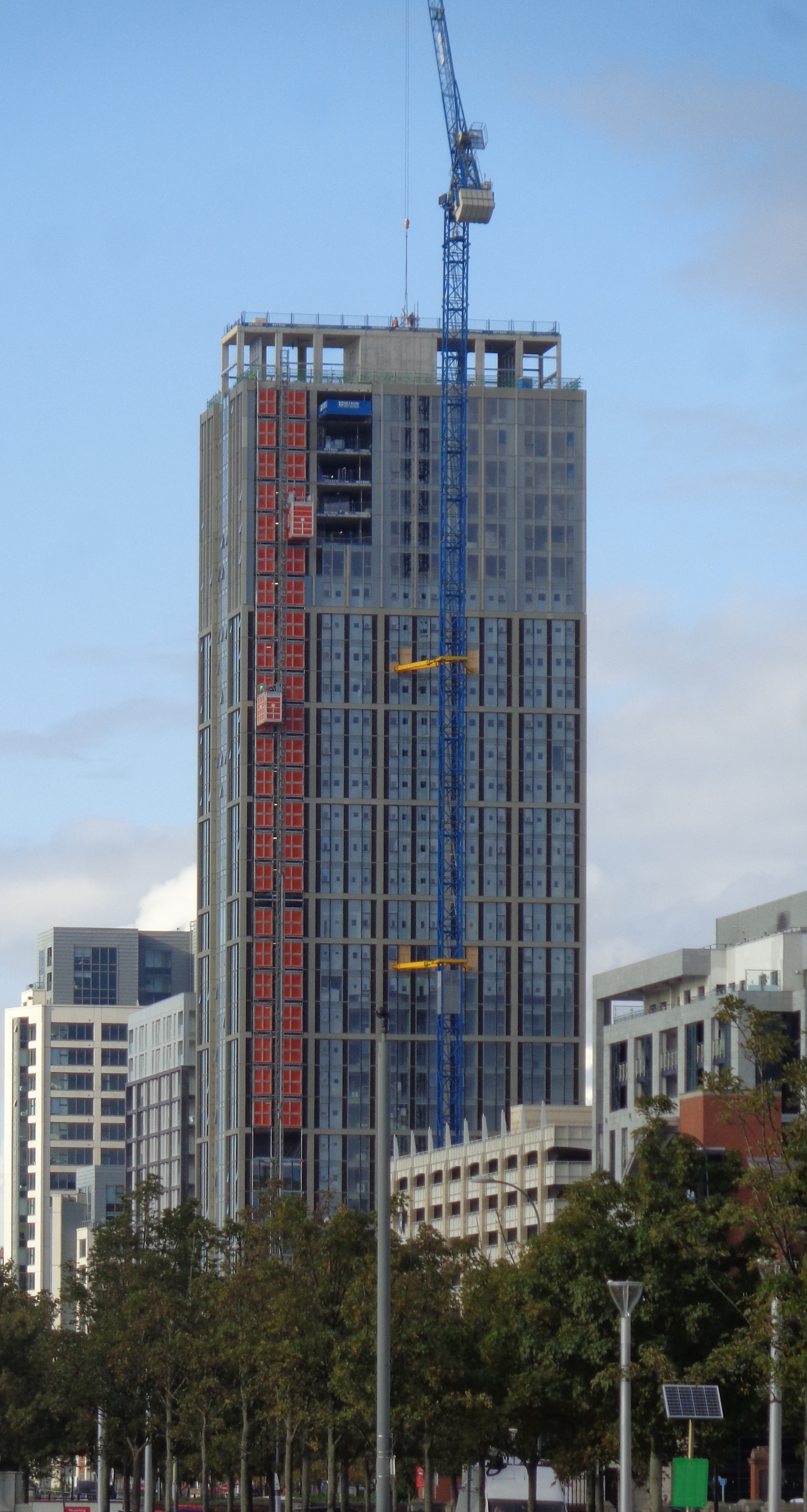
October 2020

Complete:

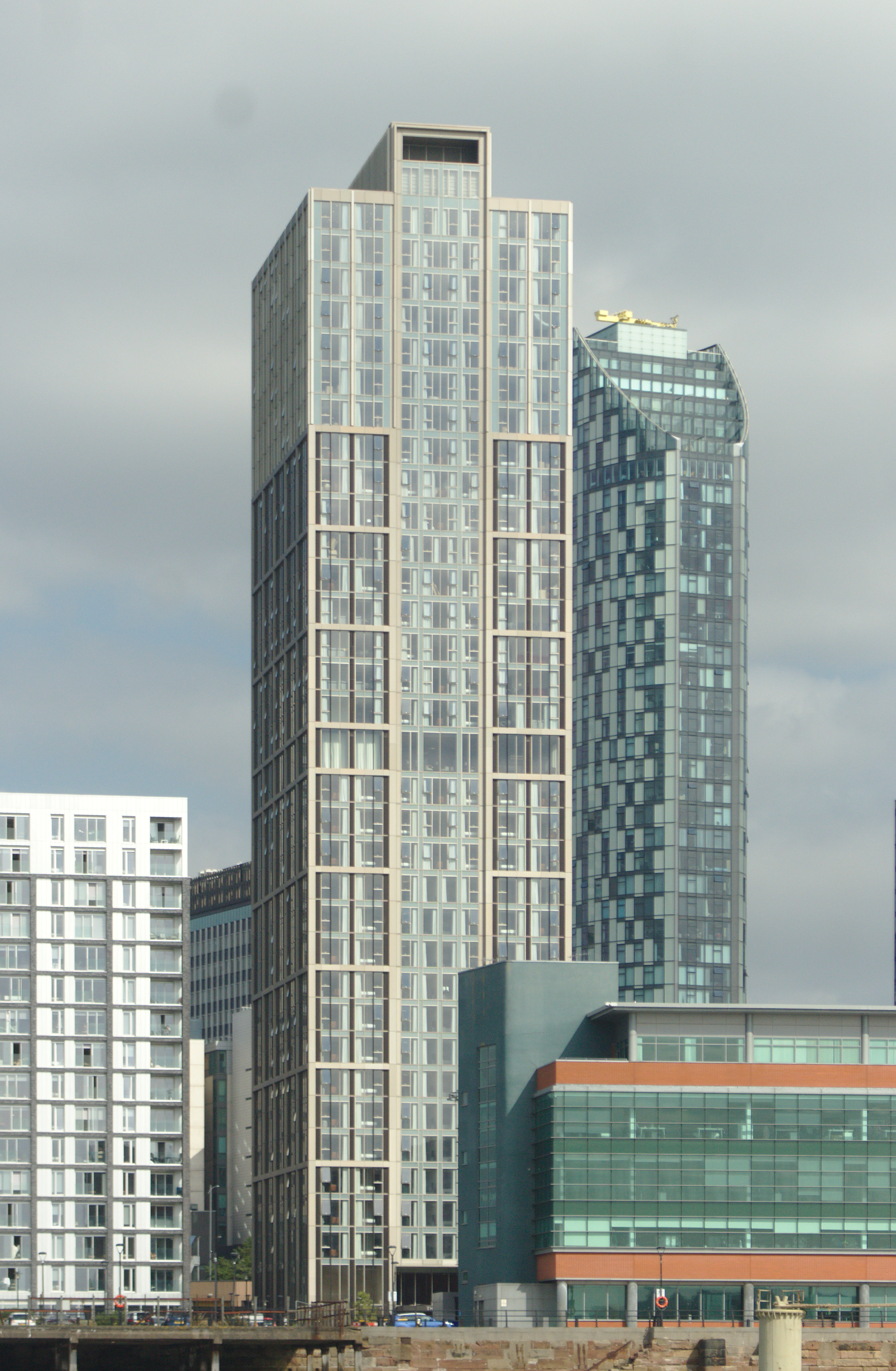
September 2021

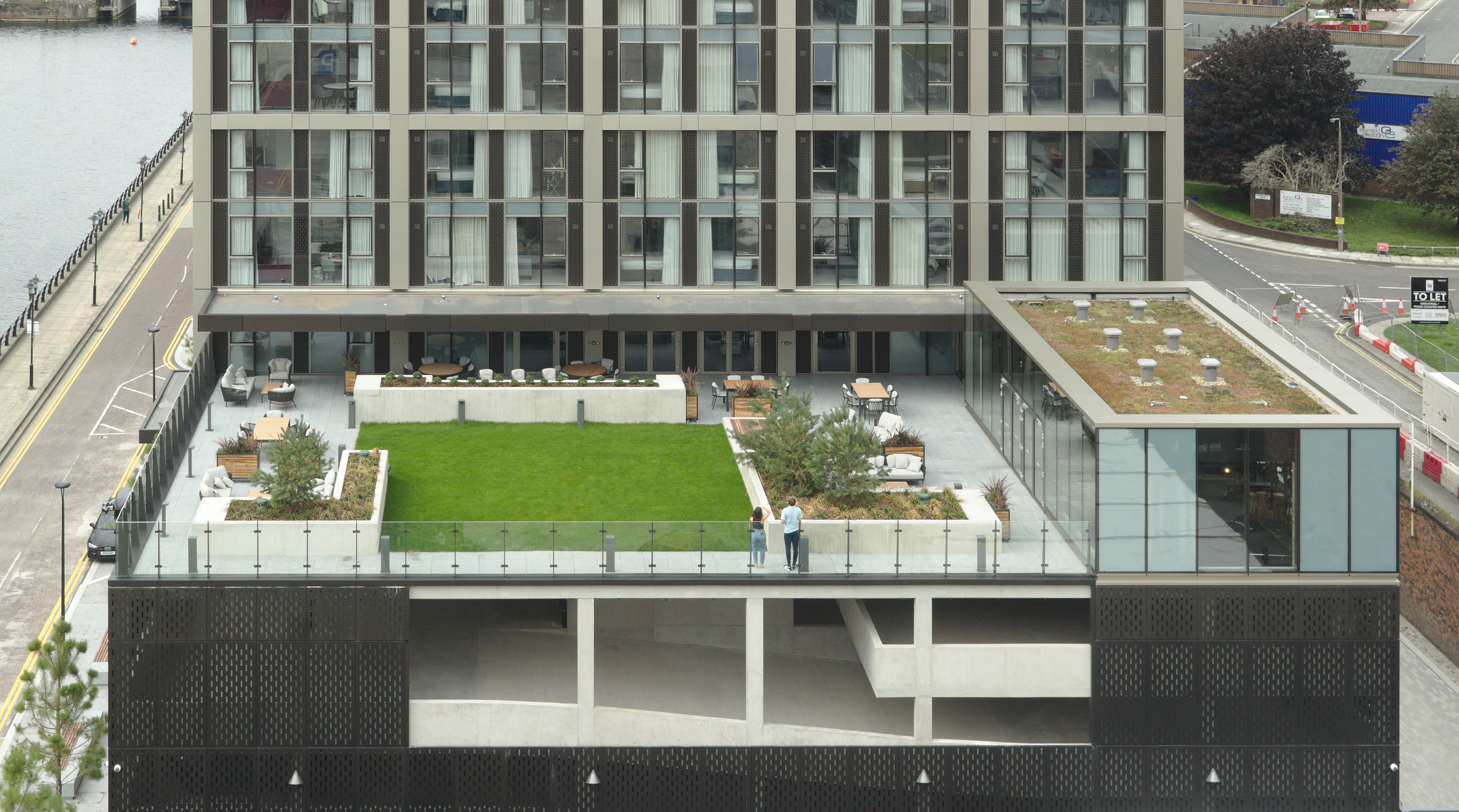
View of the rooftop terrace
