= Infinity Waters =

Residential tower complex in Liverpool, United Kingdom

- Concept image
- Interactive map of the Infinity Waters area

General information
- Status: On hold (since Q1 2020)
- Type: Residential
- Location: Liverpool, United Kingdom, Lanyork Road; Liverpool; L3 6JB
- Coordinates: 53.4128642°N 2.9941112°W
- Construction started: Q1 2019
- Estimated completion: Unknown
- Cost: £250,000,000

Height
- Height: Tower A: 123 m (404 ft); Tower B: 105 m (344 ft); Tower C: 87 m (285 ft)

Technical details
- Floor count: 39, 33, 27
- Floor area: 51,348 m^{2} (552,700 sq ft)

Design and construction
- Architecture firm: Falconer Chester Hall
- Developer: Elliot Group
- Structural engineer: WSP
- Main contractor: Vermont

Infinity Waters (also Infinity Towers or simply Infinity) is a complex of three residential towers whose construction is currently on hold in Liverpool, United Kingdom of 39, 33 and 27 storeys respectively. The largest two towers will reach skyscraper height; Tower A will become the third tallest structure in Liverpool at 122.8 m (403 ft). Located on a 7,700m^{2} brownfield site in the Vauxhall district, bordering the northern edge of the city centre, the development is costing £250 million.

One year into construction, work on the project stalled and as of Q3 2023, it remains on hold. It was originally due to complete in 2022.

== Timeline ==
In June 2016, concept designs for Infinity were originally revealed publicly by developers Elliot Group; designed by architects Falconer Chester Hall, they consisted of three glazed towers of equal height, at 34 storeys apiece. Negotiations then began with Liverpool City Council planning officers. In December, it was revealed permission had been sought, but with a revised design, most notably staggering the heights of the towers to 39, 33 and 27 storeys respectively. Planning permission was approved in April 2017.

Mees Demolition Group began work to clear the site of existing structures in April 2018. In July, Elliot Group announced Vermont Group had beaten Forrest to the construction contract.

Vermont started work on the foundations of Tower A in March 2019 using two rigs to drill concrete piles to a depth of 18 metres. In June, a crane was installed to be on site for 18 months. By August, the in situ concrete frame had been erected for much of the structure below ground level, and by November, up to level 5, with drainage work also underway.

In December 2019, the head of Elliot Group, Elliot Lawless, was arrested by Merseyside Police as part of a fraud investigation; he was released on bail without charge. Amid the ongoing probe, Vermont and Elliot Group agreed to suspend work on site in January 2020. However, due to the investigation, further development funds could not be raised. Subsequently, the scheme fell into administration in March. In April, the on-site crane was dismantled. In October 2021, 18 months later, it was reported that administrators had awarded the contract to a new developer, Legacie Developments, subject to legal clearances. However, in February 2022, the result of these legal challenges saw a judge rule in favour of a last minute bid from a consortium of investors – that the scheme should instead be sold to them instead. In autumn 2022, this group (comprising 213 of the 273 original investors) completed the takeover of the site, in a deal worth £5.9 million; a Council report classified the project as a "stalled scheme currently not progressing". In June 2023, the investor consortium claimed it was close to resolving the site's final lease-based impediments, and was determining whether to continue "building out the towers" or sell off the site to recoup loses.

== Design ==
The towers will consist of 1,002 apartments – a mix of one, two and three bedroom units and studios, starting from the third floor. Amenities will include a spa, gym, swimming pool, cinema room, communal gardens, car parking, a lounge, meeting rooms and private dining, found on the floors below; the three towers are to be connected by an external 'podium' at second floor level to allow access to the facilities located in each block and is host to the garden space. There is also a small amount of office and commercial space planned in Tower C.

== Gallery ==
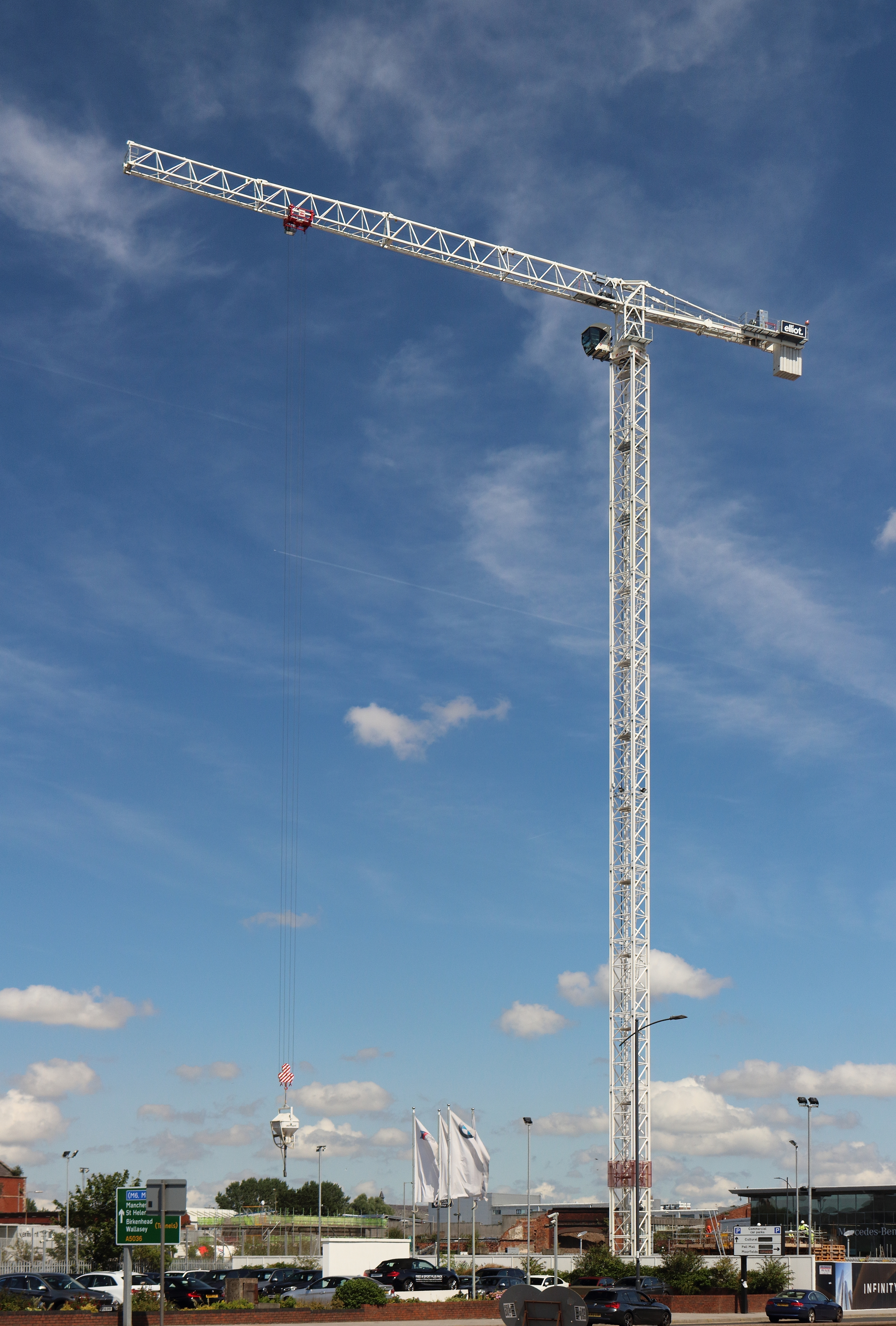
Crane at the site; August 2019

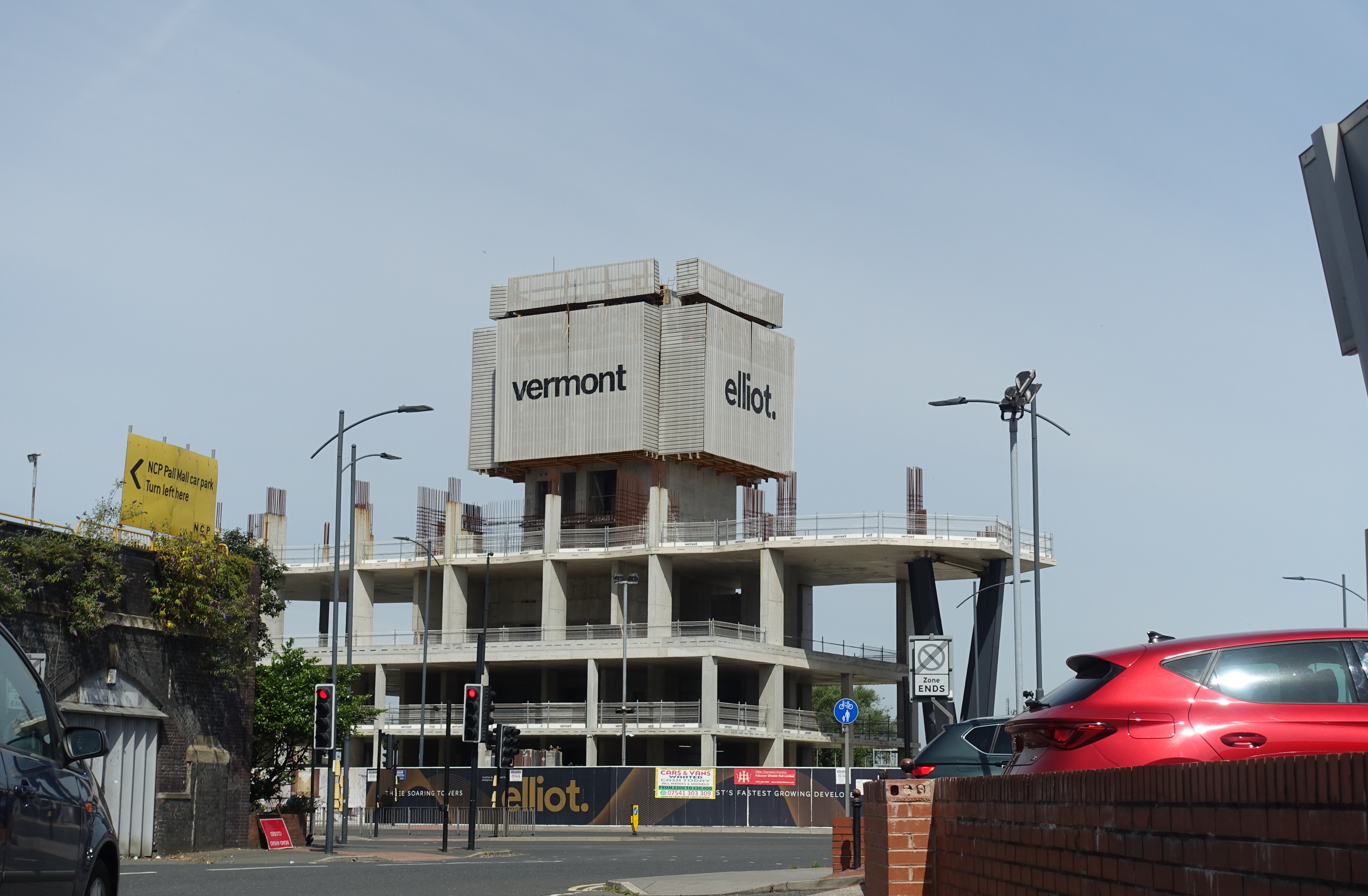
The construction site whilst stalled; July 2022
