= Shanghai Tower (Liverpool) =

- Artist's impression of Shanghai Tower dominating the Liverpool waterfront
- Interactive map of the Shanghai Tower area

General information
- Status: Proposed
- Type: Mixed
- Location: Princes Half Tide Dock, Liverpool, England, United Kingdom
- Coordinates: 53.4122°N 3.0007°W
- Cost: £300,000,000

Height
- Antenna spire: At least 200 m (656 ft)

Technical details
- Floor count: 50
- Floor area: 93,000 m^{2} (1,000,000 sq ft)

Design and construction
- Architects: AFL, Broadway Malyan, Chapman Taylor, Benoy
- Developer: Peel Group

Shanghai Tower is a proposed 50-storey skyscraper, to be built as part of the multibillion-pound Liverpool Waters development in Liverpool, England. The proposal pays homage to Shanghai in China, which is a sister city of Liverpool. As of 2017 Shanghai tower was not included in the scheme central docks master plan.

== Development ==
Plans to build the Shanghai Tower first emerged in 2007 when Peel Group pledged to build the tallest tower in North West England as a centrepiece for the ambitious Liverpool Waters development. Peel Group commissioned four architect firms (AFL, Broadway Malyan, Chapman Taylor and Benoy) to each create a design for the tower which was to be sixty storeys tall and located on an 'island' by Princes Half Tide Dock. It is hoped that Shanghai Tower will be the first major part of Liverpool Waters to be constructed, ahead of the completion of Liverpool Waters as a whole.

== Significance of name ==
Peel Group's director Lindsey Ashworth and Chairman John Whittaker are responsible for the naming of Shanghai Tower. Liverpool as a city is home to the oldest ethnic Chinese population in Europe with many of the first immigrants being sailors from the port of Shanghai. Chinese are the single largest visible ethnic minority group in Liverpool and since 1999 the strong relationship between Liverpool and Shanghai has been cemented by the twinning of the two cities. Peel Group have also said that the Liverpool Waters development was inspired by the impressive Shanghai waterfront. The Shanghai Municipal Government have shown their support for the project and envisage it boosting the relationship between the two cities even further and establish Liverpool as the leading gateway into the UK and Europe for Chinese business. There was a pavilion representing the city of Liverpool at the Expo 2010 in Shanghai which encouraged potential clients to invest into the Shanghai Tower development.

== Description of building ==
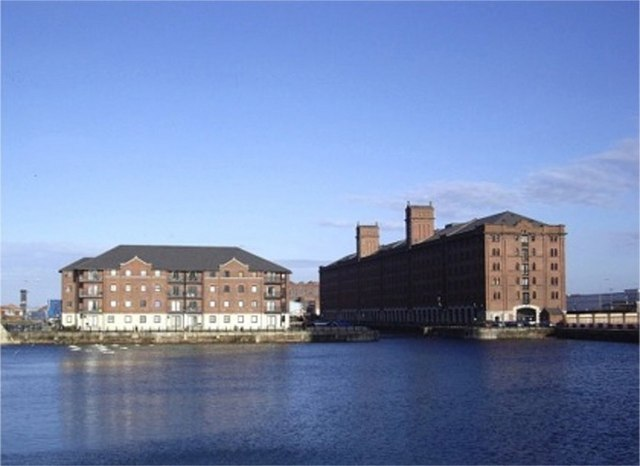
Princes Half Tide Dock, the proposed site of Liverpool's Shanghai Tower.

The exact height of the proposed building is yet to be revealed, although it will be at least 200 metres (656 ft) tall and contain 50 storeys. If built it will become the tallest building in the United Kingdom outside London. Shanghai Tower is proposed to be a mixed use skyscraper, it will contain 93,000 sq metres (approximately 1 million sq feet) of mixed use floor space, Liverpool's first five star hotel as well as apartments, bars, restaurants and leisure facilities. Also within the design is a rooftop helipad alongside an underwater basement car park.

== Status ==
The building of Shanghai Tower depends on the fate of the Liverpool Waters project itself. Although Liverpool Waters has changed form a number of times, Shanghai Tower has always remained part of it. An outline planning application for the whole of Liverpool Waters was submitted in March 2010 with Peel Group having already found a significant amount of funding. As of March 2012, Liverpool City Council has granted planning permission to the Liverpool Waters scheme as a whole. Historic England has formally objected to the plans and UNESCO has expressed concern, meaning that the proposal will have to be referred to the Communities Secretary, who will decide whether to hold a public inquiry or to allow the project to go ahead regardless. If the project continues, Shanghai Tower is expected to be completed in 2025. Note: as of 2019 there is no reference made to Shanghai Tower on the official Liverpool Waters site, nor does it appear in any of the current renders therefore its future is unknown but highly likely not to come to fruition.

== See also ==
- List of tallest buildings and structures in Liverpool
- Shanghai Tower, a Chinese megatall skyscraper with the same name
