= King Edward Tower =

- Interactive map of the King Edward Tower area

General information
- Status: Approved, but never built
- Location: Leeds Street, Liverpool, England, United Kingdom
- Coordinates: 53°24′47″N 2°59′21.9″W

Height
- Antenna spire: 199 metres (653 ft)

Technical details
- Floor count: 67

Design and construction
- Architect: Maurice Shapero
- Developer: Y1 Developments/ Richmont Properties

King Edward Tower was a proposed skyscraper to be constructed on the junction of Great Howard Street and Leeds Street in Liverpool, England. The tower was first proposed in 2007, received funding in 2008 and was altered pending approval in 2010. The estimated cost of the development was £130 million. If built, the tower would have become the tallest structure of any kind in Liverpool, taking the title from West Tower.

Originally the development was known as the King Edward Towers because two buildings were proposed to be built. Each would have been roughly 130m tall and have between 40 and 50 floors. However, this idea was soon changed to a single, taller tower The building was intended to be mixed use with roughly 412 apartments, plus large amounts of office (25,000 square feet (2,300 m^{2})) and retail (7,500 square feet (700 m^{2})) space alongside basement level parking. There were also plans for a restaurant which will take up the entire 14th floor, with a rooftop bar likely

In early 2010 a new modified design of the tower was presented to the public. Subject to planning, construction for this design was planned to have begun in 2011 and ended in 2014.

New designs produced by Maurice Shapero emerged in early 2012 which replaced those of Rhodes Leach Walker. A planning application was expected to be submitted in Spring 2012.

In 2015, it was reported the scheme had been abandoned and the site due to be sold.

== See also ==
- List of tallest buildings and structures in Liverpool
