= The Plaza, Liverpool =

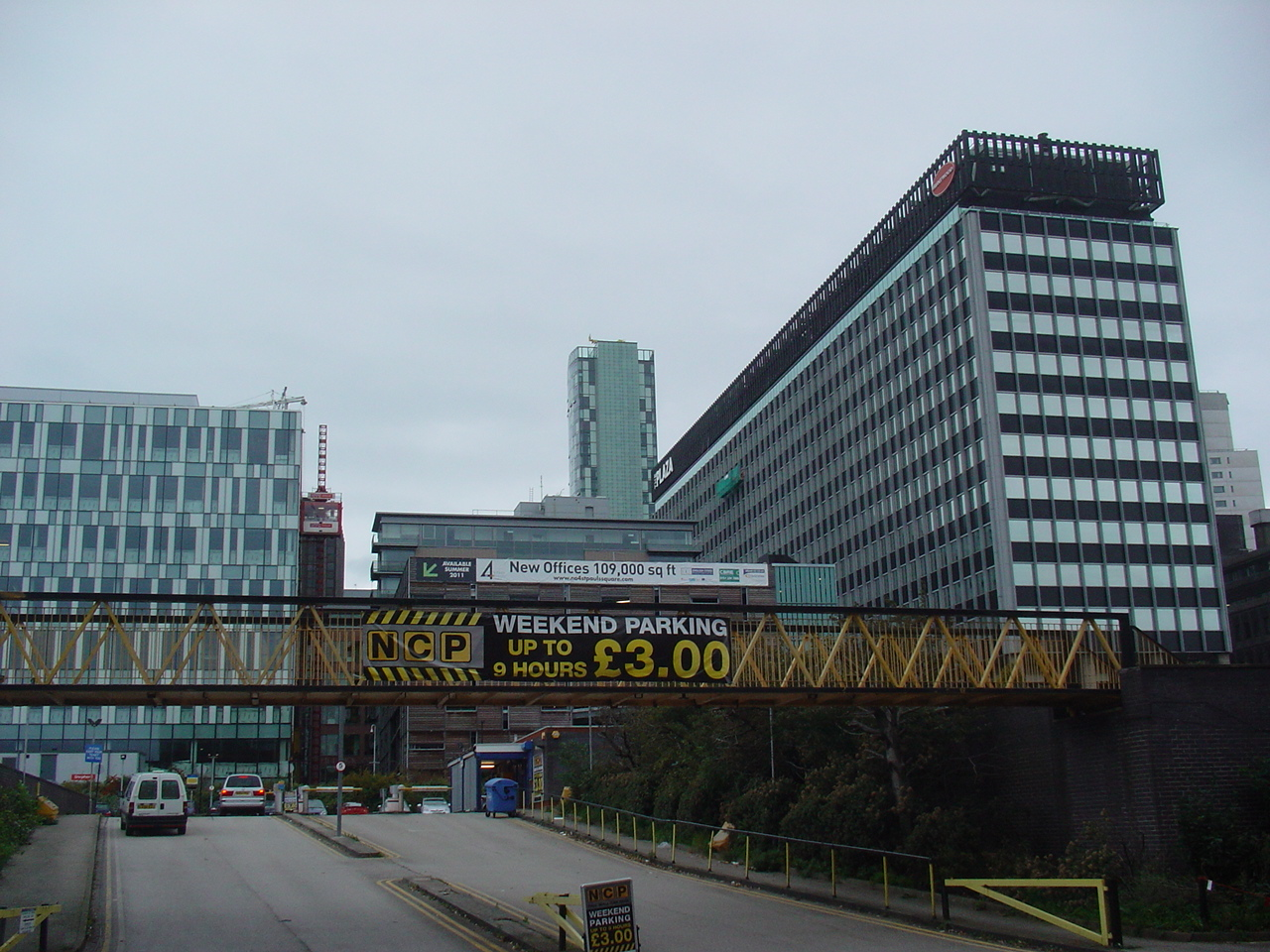
- The Plaza as seen from Pall Mall

General information
- Type: Office
- Location: Liverpool, England, United Kingdom
- Coordinates: 53.41079°N 2.9948°W
- Completed: 1965
- Owner: Bruntwood

Height
- Roof: 65 metres (213 ft)

Technical details
- Floor count: 18

The Plaza (also known as the Sir John Moores Building and 100 Old Hall Street) is an 18-storey office complex in the L3 commercial district of Liverpool, England, United Kingdom. At 65 m (213 ft), The Plaza is Liverpool's joint 14th tallest building. It dominates the city's skyline, especially since it has a length of over 125 m (410 ft) – which is two times the building's height. Construction of The Plaza was completed in 1965, and the entire building was refurbished and renovated in 2005 to its current appearance. Office space in the building is currently owned and leased by Bruntwood (who also own ten other properties in the city).

Originally the head office of now defunct catalogue retailer, Littlewoods and named after company founder John Moores, it served as one of two Littlewoods headquarters in the company's history (the other Littlewoods Building being located near the Edge Hill area of the city). However, as stated earlier, the newly renovated building is now home to numerous companies and organisations.

== Gallery ==
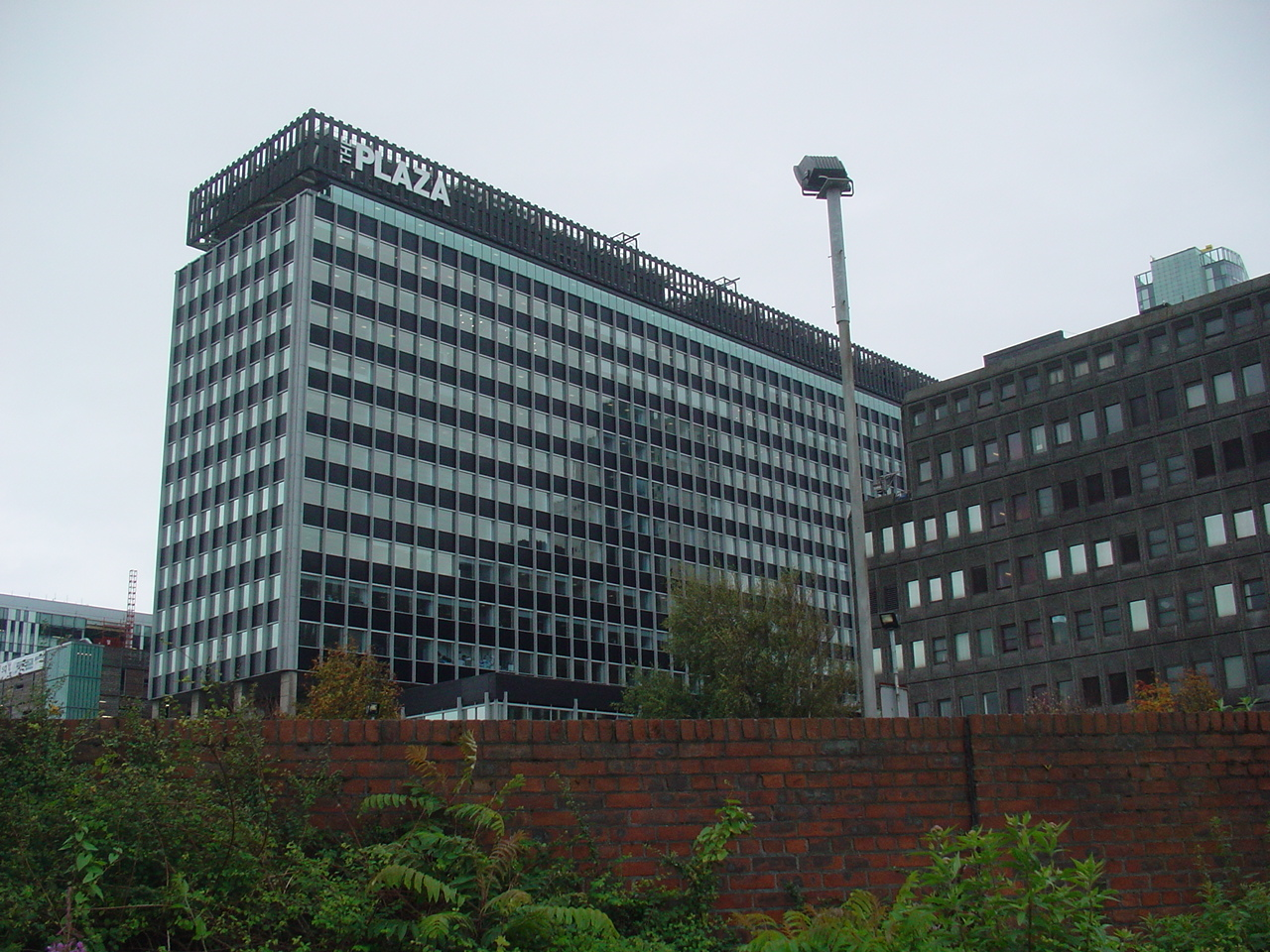
The Plaza

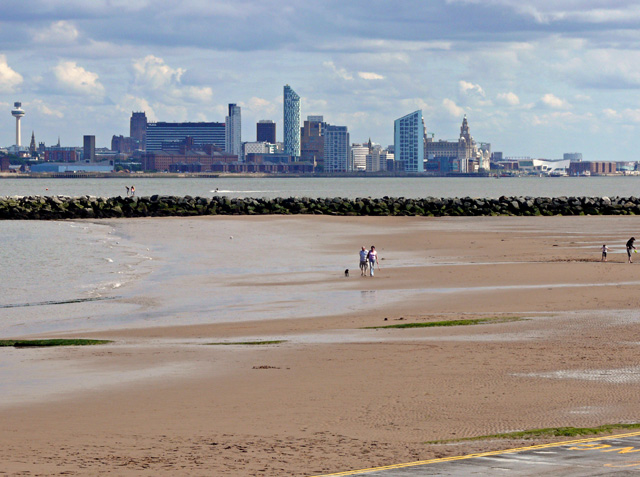
The Plaza can clearly be seen between Liverpool Cathedral and the Beetham Tower in this panorama

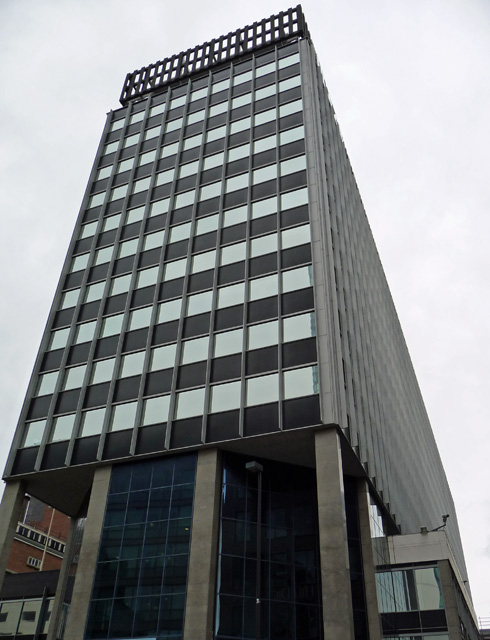
Close up of The Plaza

== See also ==
- List of tallest buildings and structures in Liverpool
- Littlewoods
- John Moores
