= Ladislav Bublík =

Czechoslovak writer

Ladislav Bublík (Bzenec 14 May 1924 - Ostrava 12 April 1988) was a Czechoslovak writer. He is best known for his novel Páteř (The Spine, 1963).

== Fiction ==
- Perpetuum mobile (1949)
- Rozkaz (The Warrant, 1951)
- Velká tavba (Large smelting, 1949)
- Horoucí láska (Ardent Love, 1955)
- Páteř (The Spine, 1963)
