= The Spine, Liverpool =

Tall building in Liverpool, England

The Spine
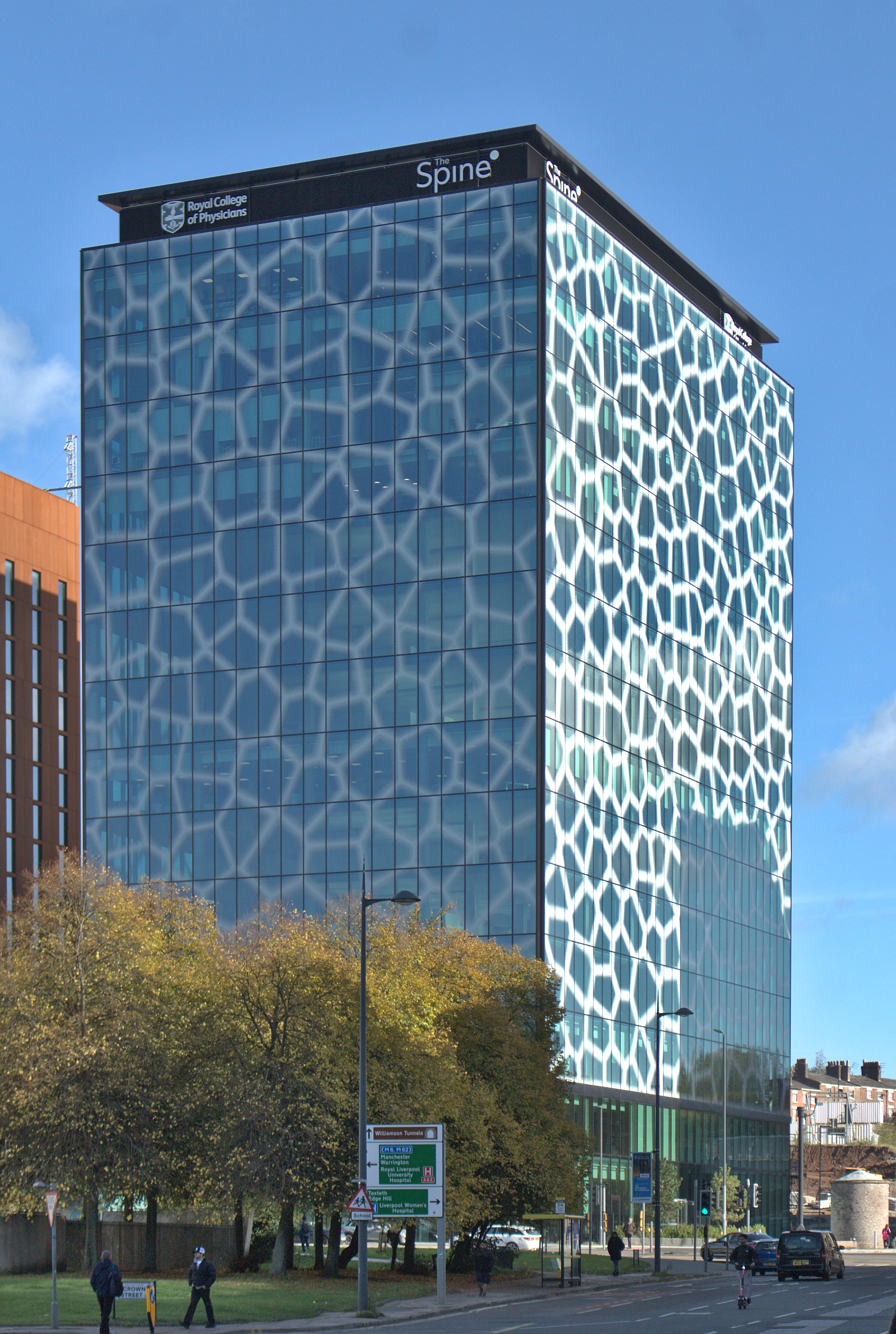
- The Spine building
- Interactive map of the The Spine area

General information
- Coordinates: 53°24′24″N 2°57′39″W
- Construction started: 2018
- Completed: 2021
- Cost: £35,000,000
- Owner: Liverpool City Council

Height
- Height: 65m

Technical details
- Floor count: 14

Design and construction
- Architect: AHR
- Main contractor: Morgan Sindall Construction

Website
- https://www.spacesatthespine.co.uk/

The Spine is a 14-storey building in Liverpool, England. It is located in Paddington Village, Knowledge Quarter. Construction was completed in May 2021 at a cost of £35 million. It was the first Grade A office building built in Liverpool for over a decade.

The Spine achieved WELL Standard Platinum accreditation from the WELL Building Standard. This recognition was for the design features of the building that promote occupant health and wellbeing.

Tenants include the Royal College of Physicians (RCP), The Pandemic Institute, and The Clatterbridge Cancer Centre. The RCP is the anchor tenant and occupy seven floors in the building as part of their northern headquarters.
