= North Dock =

North Dock may refer to

- North Dock, Garston
- North Dock, Swansea
