= Grade II listed buildings in Liverpool-L19 =

Liverpool is a city and port in Merseyside, England, which contains many listed buildings. A listed building is a structure designated by English Heritage of being of architectural and/or of historical importance and, as such, is included in the National Heritage List for England. There are three grades of listing, according to the degree of importance of the structure. Grade I includes those buildings that are of "exceptional interest, sometimes considered to be internationally important"; the buildings in Grade II* are "particularly important buildings of more than special interest"; and those in Grade II are "nationally important and of special interest". Very few buildings are included in Grade I — only 2.5% of the total. Grade II* buildings represent 5.5% of the total, while the great majority, 92%, are included in Grade II.

Liverpool contains more than 1,550 listed buildings, of which 28 are in Grade I, 109 in Grade II*, and the rest in Grade II. (Note: These figures are taken from a search in the National Heritage List for England in May 2013, and are subject to variation as further buildings are listed, grades are revised, or buildings are delisted.) This list contains the Grade II listed buildings in the L19 postal district of Liverpool. The district lies to the south of the city centre and is largely residential. It incorporates the former village of Garston. To the north of Garston are the private estates of Grassendale Park and Cressington Park, which were built in the 1840s and 1850s to provide houses for the wealthy citizens of Liverpool.

Grade II listed buildings from other areas in the city can be found through the box on the right, along with the lists of the Grade I and Grade II* buildings in the city.

== Buildings ==
Name	Location	Photograph	Built	Notes
—	1 Aigburth Hall Avenue; 53.3649°N 2.9189°W	—	Early 19th century	A roughcast house with a slate roof. It is in two storeys with an attic, and has a front of four bays, the fourth bay being recessed and lower. The first and third bays project forward under shaped gables. In the ground floor are canted bay windows with friezes and cornices. The windows are casements. The porch is recessed, and has central paired Tuscan columns and an entablature.
Oak House	17–19 Aigburth Hall Road; 53.3663°N 2.9132°W	—	1842	This was originally one house, later divided into two houses. It is built in red ashlar with a slate roof. The house has two storeys with a basement, and a four-bay front. The central two bays are gabled with decorative bargeboards, and contain three-light mullioned windows and wooden balconies with balustrades. The entrances are on the sides with lean-to porches.
St Austin's Church	Aigburth Road; 53.3613°N 2.9122°W		1838	A Roman Catholic church, built in brick with stone dressings and a stone façade, and a slate roof. The west front has a gabled porch, a niche with a statue flanked by lancet windows, and a rose window. At the corners are octagonal turrets. On the sides of the church are more lancet windows. Inside the church is a west gallery.
Parish Hall, St Austin's Church	Aigburth Road; 53.3618°N 2.9117°W	—	1860	This originated as a school, later used as the parish hall. It is built in brick with a slate roof, and is in a single storey. It has a three-bay front, the end bays projecting forward under gables. The windows are mullioned with two and three lights. At the left end is a porch above which is a buttressed bellcote with a pinnacle.
Presbytery, St Austin's Church	Aigburth Road; 53.3614°N 2.9120°W	—	c. 1838	The presbytery is attached to the rear of the church. It is in brick with stone dressings, and has a slate roof. The presbytery is in three storeys, and has a three-bay front. There is an oriel window and a single casement window; the other windows are sashes.
St Mary's Church	Aigburth Road; 53.3598°N 2.9110°W		1852–53	The church was designed by A. H. Holme to serve the newly built private estates. It is constructed in stone with a slate roof. The church is broad, without aisles but with wide transepts. It has a short apsidal chancel, and a northwest broached steeple. Inside, the wooden beams of the roof form a flying cross above the crossing.
Gate piers, Cressington Park	Aigburth Road; 53.36003°N 2.91132°W	—	Mid 19th century	The gate piers stand at the entrance to Cressington Park; three of these are original. and three are new. They are in stone, square, and decorated with panels. At the top are cornices and fluted capitals, antefixae, and ridged caps.
Lodge, Cressington Park	Aigburth Road; 53.36018°N 2.91162°W	—	1852	The lodge is built in stone with a slate roof. It is in a single storey, and has a three-bay front. Its features include channelled rustication, an entablature, and a Vitruvian scroll frieze. In the centre of the lodge is a recessed Tuscan porch with square columns. The windows are sashes.
Street lamp, Cressington Park	Aigburth Road; 53.35999°N 2.91148°W	—	Mid 19th century	The street lamp is located near the lodge to the entrance to Cressington Park. It is in iron, and has a fluted shaft on an octagonal base. At the top are cross arms and a lantern.
Main Pavilion, Liverpool Cricket Club	Aigburth Road; 53.36367°N 2.91819°W		1880	The pavilion is in red brick with applied timber framing and has a tile roof. There are three storeys with a second-floor balcony, a first-floor veranda and a tiered terrace. On the front of the main block are three gables, the middle one the largest, half-hipped and containing a clock face.
—	563 and 565 Aigburth Road; 53.3610°N 2.9119°W	—	c. 1840s	A pair of stuccoed houses with a slate roof. They are in two storeys, and each house has three bays. In each house the central bay projects forward under a gable with a decorative bargeboard. The windows are a mix of sashes and casements.
The Chestnuts	Beechwood Road; 53.3595°N 2.9214°W	—	Mid 19th century	A stuccoed house with a slate roof, it is in two storeys with an attic. There are three bays on the front, the lateral bays projecting forwards under gables. The windows are mullioned and transomed. In the centre is a gabled porch with a finial and an entrance under a four-centred arch. The porch is flanked by iron lamp standards. At the rear of the house is an iron verandah.
The Dell	Beechwood Road; 53.3595°N 2.9210°W	—	Mid 19th century	A stuccoed house with a slate roof, it is in two storeys with an attic. There are three bays on the front, the lateral bays projecting forwards under gables with finials. The windows are mullioned and transomed. In the centre is a gabled porch with a finial and an entrance under a four-centred arch.
—	16 and 18 Beechwood Road; 53.3603°N 2.9203°W	—	Mid 19th century	Two stuccoed houses with a slate roof. They have two storeys and a three-bay front. The windows are casements. Features include rectangular bay windows, one with a cornice, and gables and a porch with decorative bargeboards.
Garston Library	Bowden Road; 53.3582°N 2.9060°W		1908	The library was designed by Thomas Shelmerdine and shows the influence of the Arts and Crafts movement. It is rendered on a sandstone plinth, apart from some exposed stone in the middle. The library has a slate roof. Its front is symmetrical, with a large central gable containing a window, and half-timbered gablets to the sides.
Springwood Cottages	24 and 26 Brocklebank Lane; 53.3626°N 2.8902°W	—	1684	A pair of houses in red sandstone and brick with a slate roof. They are in two storeys with a five-bay front, the end bays being recessed. There is a gable on the fourth bay. The windows include a three-light casement and two three-light sliding-sash windows. The entrance is in the fourth bays, and has a canopy with a four-centred arch.
St Michael's Church	Church Road; 53.3521°N 2.8970°W		1875–77	This Anglican church was designed by Thomas D. Berry and Son, and replaced earlier churches built respectively in 1225 and 1715. The church is constructed in sandstone with slate roofs, and consists of a nave with a clerestory, aisles, a south porch, transepts, a chancel with an apse and chapels, and a northwest tower.
Oak Cottage	Cooper Avenue South; 53.3665°N 2.9135°W	—	1842	The lodge to Oak House, it is built in stone with a slate roof. It is in a single storey with a two-bay front. The windows are sashes. At the centre of the lodge are projecting pilasters and an archivolt.
—	33 Garston Old Road; 53.3612°N 2.9097°W	—	Mid 19th century	A stuccoed house with a hipped slate roof. It has two storeys and a three-bay front, the end bay projecting under a gable. The windows in the ground floor are casements; those in the upper floor are sashes. The central entrance has a timber gabled porch. In the upper floor are two iron balconies. On the right side of the house is an external staircase to a first floor entrance.
—	37 Garston Old Road; 53.3613°N 2.9095°W	—	Mid 19th century	A stuccoed house with a hipped slate roof. It has two storeys and a three-bay front, the end bay projecting under a gable. The windows in the ground floor are casements; those in the upper floor are sashes. In the upper floor is an iron balcony.
—	41 Garston Old Road; 53.3614°N 2.9093°W	—	Mid 19th century	A stuccoed house with a hipped slate roof. It has two storeys and a three-bay front, the end bay projecting under a gable. In the third bay is a rectangular bay window. The windows in the ground floor are casements; those in the upper floor are sashes. In the upper floor is an iron balcony.
St Mary's Terrace	45–57 Garston Old Road; 53.3616°N 2.9090°W	—	1852	A terrace of seven brick houses with stone dressings and a slate roof. The terrace is in three storeys, and each house has a two-bay front. Along the top of the building is a frieze and a cornice. Most of the windows are sashes. Each house has a round-headed entrance with a Doric doorcase flanked by fluted columns.
Holmefield	Holmefield Road; 53.3687°N 2.9186°W	—	Early 19th century	Originally a house, later part of the I. M. Marsh Campus of John Moores University. It is a stuccoed building with a hipped roof, and has fronts of five and three bays, the end bays projecting forward. Other than a casement window in the centre of the first floor, the windows are sashes. At the entrance is an Ionic porch with paired pilasters.
Grange Hotel	14 Holmefield Road; 53.3668°N 2.9205°W		Mid 19th century	Originating as a house, this was later used as a hotel. It is a complex stuccoed building in two storeys with an attic. The front has four bays. The second bay projects forward under a gable with decorative bargeboards on brackets carved with dragons. In front of the third and fourth bays is a single-bay extension containing an entrance under a four-centred arch, above which is a parapet with a pediment. On the right side of the building is a verandah.
—	27 Holmefield Road; 53.36704°N 2.92045°W		Mid 19th century	A stuccoed house with a slate roof in cottage orné style. It has two storeys and a basement, and a three-bay front, the central bay projecting forward under a shaped gable and containing a single-storey canted bay window. In the third bays is a niche, and there is another niche above the porch on the right side. All the windows are casements. On the ends of the gables are carvings of animals' heads.
Cressington railway station	Knowsley Road; 53.3588°N 2.9121°W		1873	The railway station was built for the Cheshire Lines Committee. It is constructed in brick with a slate roof. It is in two storeys, with a single-storey extension on each side. The entrance is in the upper storey, which has a gable with a pierced bargeboard. The windows are sashes under arched heads. The chimneys are tall and moulded. On each platform is a cast iron canopy.
Gate piers	North Road, Grassendale Park; 53.35857°N 2.91700°W	—	c. 1840s	The four gate piers stand at the entrance to Grassendale Park They are in stone, square and stand on bases. On the shafts are Tuscan pilasters, and at the top are entablatures. One of the piers has retained its lantern.
Street lamps	North Road, Grassendale Park; 53.35669°N 2.91990°W	—	c. 1840s	In North Road there are eleven street lamps. They are in iron and have 20th-century lanterns.
—	1 North Road, Grassendale Park; 53.3585°N 2.9169°W	North Road	1840s	A single-storey stuccoed lodge with a slate roof and a two-bay front. On the sides are angle pilasters, and at the top are a cornice, a frieze and a parapet. The windows and the entrance have segmental heads, and the windows are sashes.
Arcadia	3 North Road, Grassendale Park; 53.3582°N 2.9169°W	—	c. 1860	A stuccoed house with a slate roof. It has two storeys and a three-bay front. On the front are a canted bay window, and a rectangular bay window with an iron balcony. The ground floor windows are casements; those in the upper floor are sashes. In the centre is an iron porch with a balcony.
Ormiston	5 North Road, Grassendale Park; 53.3579°N 2.9171°W	—	1840s	A stuccoed house with a slate roof. It has two storeys and a three-bay front. On the corners are angle pilasters, and at the top is an entablature. All the windows are sashes. There is a central entrance with a portico and a pediment supported by two columns. On the right side of the house is a bow window and a first-floor iron balcony.
Norton	10 North Road, Grassendale Park; 53.3578°N 2.9182°W	—	1840s	A stuccoed house with a slate roof. It has two storeys with a basement, and a three-bay front. In the ground floor are rectangular bay windows with angle pilasters and entablatures. Between them is a Doric-style porch with two columns decorated with an anthemion motif. The windows are casements.
—	11 North Road, Grassendale Park; 53.3574°N 2.9177°W	—	1860s	A stuccoed house with a slate roof. It has two storeys with an attic, and a three-bay front. In the first bay is a canted bay window. The windows are a mix of casements and sashes. In the centre of the house is an entrance with a lancet window to the right.
Angorfa	14 North Road, Grassendale Park; 53.3575°N 2.9185°W	—	1840s	A stuccoed house with a slate roof. It has two storeys with an attic, and a three-bay front. The first bay contains, and the third bay has a rectangular bay window, both in two storeys. At the top of the first bay is a gable, and at the top of the third bay is a gabled dormer. The windows are sashes apart from the attic, which has casement windows.
Monksferry House	17 North Road, Grassendale Park; 53.3577°N 2.9157°W	—	1840s	A stuccoed house with a slate roof. It has two storeys with a basement, and a three-bay front. At the top of the house is an entablature. In the ground floor there are two canted bay windows with iron balconies. The windows are sashes. Above the central doorway is a pediment.
Woodside and Wenstead	20 and 22 North Road, Grassendale Park; 53.3572°N 2.9193°W	—	1840s	A pair of stuccoed houses with a slate roof. They are in two storeys with a basement, and each house has a three-bay front, plus a central bay containing a blind window. At the top of the building is a frieze, and on the corners are panelled pilasters. On the first floor are two iron balconies. The windows are sashes. The entrances are on the sides.
Langdale and Holt House	23 and 25 North Road, Grassendale Park; 53.3569°N 2.9191°W	—	1840s	A pair of stuccoed houses with a slate roof. They are in two storeys with a basement, and each house has a three-bay front. On the corners are angle pilasters, and at the top is a frieze. All the windows are sashes. On the first floor of each house are two iron balconies. The entrances are on the sides of the houses.
—	24 and 26 North Road, Grassendale Park; 53.3570°N 2.9197°W	—	1840s	A pair of stuccoed houses with a slate roof. They are in two storeys with a basement, and each house has a three-bay front, plus a central bay containing a blind window. At the top of the building is a frieze, and on the corners are panelled pilasters. On the first floor are two iron balconies. The windows are sashes. The entrances are on the sides.
The Old House	28 North Road, Grassendale Park; 53.3565°N 2.9207°W	—	1840s	A stuccoed house with a slate roof. It has two storeys with an attic and a basement, and fronts of three bays on each side. The ground floor is rusticated. At the top of the house is a frieze and a cornice, and at the sides are quoins. The porch projects forward, and has a round-headed entrance with angle pilasters and an archivolt. The first floor contains an iron balcony. On the left front are three single-storey canted bay windows.
Norwood and Gage House	33 and 35 North Road, Grassendale Park; 53.3565°N 2.9199°W	—	1840s	A pair of stuccoed houses with a slate roof. They are in two storeys and have a four-bay front, the end bays projecting forward under pedimented gables. The ground floor windows have panelled pilasters, a frieze with wreaths, and a modillioned cornice. Running across the middle two bays is a four-column colonnade. The central first-floor windows are sashes; the others are casements.
Stapley	37 North Road, Grassendale Park; 53.3563°N 2.9203°W	—	1840s	A stuccoed house with a slate roof. It has two storeys with an attic and a basement, and fronts of three and two bays. The ground floor is rusticated. At the top of the house is a frieze and a cornice. The ground floor windows have angle pilasters and a dentilled cornice; those in the first floor also have architraves and friezes. In the first floor is a balustraded balcony; the porch also has a balustrade. In the gabled attic are round-headed windows. On the right side of the house are two canted bay windows with Doric columns.
Street lamps	South Road, Grassendale Park; 53.35638°N 2.91781°W	—	c. 1840s	In South Road there are 15 street lamps. They are in iron and have retained their original lanterns and square chimneys.
Beechville	7 South Road, Grassendale Park; 53.3580°N 2.9164°W	—	1840s	A stuccoed house with a slate roof. It has two storeys and a two-bay front, the first bay projecting forward. At the top of the house is a frieze and a cornice. The first bay contains a canted bay window with a cornice and a balustrade. In the second bay is a rectangular bay window with a frieze and a cornice. All the windows are sashes.
Southwood	12 and 14 South Road, Grassendale Park; 53.3570°N 2.9172°W	—	1840s	A pair of stuccoed houses with a slate roof. They are in two storeys with a basement, and each house has a two-bay front. At the top of the houses is a cornice. The windows are sashes with angle pilasters and entablatures. There are blind windows in the first floor and above the entrances.
Whitehouse	22 South Road, Grassendale Park; 53.3565°N 2.9180°W	—	1840s	A stuccoed house with a slate roof. It has two storeys and a two-bay front, the first bay projecting forward. At the top of the house is a frieze and a cornice. The first bay contains a canted bay window with a cornice and a balustrade. In the second bay is a rectangular bay window with a frieze and a cornice. All the windows are sashes. On the left side is a round-headed entrance with an architrave.
Mitford Lodge	31 South Road, Grassendale Park; 53.3567°N 2.9168°W	—	1840s	A stuccoed house with a slate roof. It has two storeys and a two-bay front, the first bay projecting forward. At the top of the house is a frieze and a cornice. The first bay contains a canted bay window. The windows are sashes. The entrance is on the left side of the house.
—	39 and 41 South Road, Grassendale Park; 53.3561°N 2.9177°W	—	1840s	A pair of stuccoed houses with a slate roof. They are in two storeys with a basement, and each house has a two-bay front. At the top of the houses is a frieze and a cornice. All the windows are sashes; those in the ground floor have angle pilasters and entablatures, and the upper floor windows have architraves and dentilled cornices. On the front of the house are two iron balconies.
Match Factory	Speke Road; 53.3505°N 2.8861°W		1919–21	The factory was owned by Bryant and May, but closed in 1994, and has been converted into offices called The Matchworks. It was the first building in the United Kingdom to be built in flat-slab concrete. The building is in two storeys, with 35 bays on its north elevation, and 16 bays on the west elevation.
River Bank	1 The Esplanade, Grassendale Park; 53.3567°N 2.9210°W	—	1840s	A stuccoed house with a slate roof in two storeys with a basement. It has a four-bay front, the first two bays being lower and recessed. The other two bays contain two-storey canted bay windows. The windows are a mix of sashes and casements. The entrance on the right side of the house has angle pilasters, an archivolt, and a fanlight.
—	9 and 11 The Esplanade, Grassendale Park; 53.3560°N 2.9199°W		1840s	A pair of stuccoed houses with a slate roof. They are in two storeys with an attic, and each house has a two-bay front, the end bays projecting forward under open pediments. At the top of the house is a cornice. All the windows are sashes, those in the first floor having architraves; those in the attic are under round heads with pilasters and archivolts.
Fairholme and Scarletts	13 and 15 The Esplanade, Grassendale Park; 53.3556°N 2.9194°W		1840s	A pair of stuccoed houses with a slate roof. They are in two storeys with an attic, and have a four-bay front. On the front are four two-storey canted bay windows. At the top of the house is an entablature, and on the ends of the building are angle pilasters. All the windows are sashes. The entrances are on the sides with gabled porches.

== See also ==
- Architecture of Liverpool

== References and notes ==
Notes

Citations

Sources

- Pollard, Richard; Pevsner, Nikolaus (2006), Lancashire: Liverpool and the South-West, The Buildings of England, New Haven and London: Yale University Press, ISBN 0-300-10910-5
