= Reg Leck =

English footballer

Personal information
- Full name: Reginald Leck
- Date of birth: 29 January 1890
- Place of birth: Aigburth, Liverpool, England
- Position: Inside left

Senior career*
Years	Team	Apps	(Gls)
- Aigburth Vale
- Zalkyrie
- Tranmere Rovers
1921–1922	Wrexham	13	(3)
- * Club domestic league appearances and goals

Reginald Leck (29 January 1890 – date of death unknown) was an English professional footballer who played as an inside-left. He made appearances in the English Football League for Wrexham, notably scoring the only goal in Wrexham's first ever Football League victory in a 0-1 away win over Hartlepool United.

He spent the majority of his career at Tranmere Rovers, where he was described by The Liverpool Echo as a "popular player".
