= Grassendale =

Suburb of Liverpool, England

Coordinates: 53.358°N 2.907°W

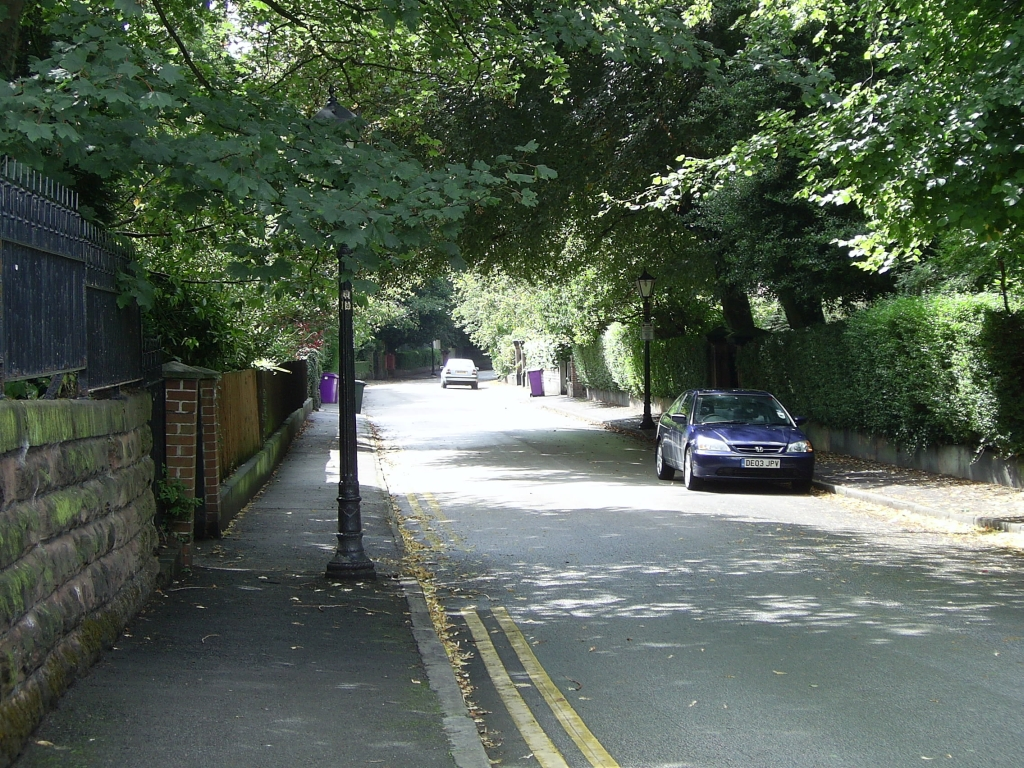
- Knowsley Road, Grassendale

- Location within Merseyside
- OS grid reference: SJ396850
- Metropolitan borough: City of Liverpool
- Metropolitan county: Merseyside
- Region: North West
- Country: England
- Sovereign state: United Kingdom
- Post town: LIVERPOOL
- Postcode district: L19
- Dialling code: 0151
- Police: Merseyside
- Fire: Merseyside
- Ambulance: North West
- UK Parliament: Liverpool Garston

Grassendale is a suburb of Liverpool, Merseyside, England. It is in the south of the city, bordered by Aigburth, Garston and Mossley Hill.

== History ==
The hamlet of Grassendale was acquired by Robert de Blackburn, the lord of the manor of Garston, from Richard de Toxteth in the 14th century. In the 19th century it developed as a residential suburb. Grassendale was made into an ecclesiastical parish in 1855 following the opening of St Mary's Church in August 1853. Grassendale was recorded as a site with Catholic landowners in 1717. The Roman Catholic church of St. Austin, served by the English Benedictines, opened in 1838.

== Description ==
Grassendale is an almost entirely residential suburb which consists of large, detached 19th century villas. The area is particularly green, and houses are commonly set well back from the road. This district retains classic-style streetlamps.

Among the residences, is Grassendale House, with 20 acres of land, the property of George Hargreaves, Esq., who is also owner of Beach Lawn, occupied by W.J. Marrow, Esq.; and at Grassendale is the villa of J. Grant Morris, Esq.

— Gargrave - Gatenby: A Topographical Dictionary of England (1848), pp. 279–282.

Grassendale Park and Cressington Park were designated as conservation areas on 13 November 1968. The ward, which contains both parks and the housing, is called Cressington. Otterspool Promenade is located nearby and runs along the bank of the River Mersey from just north of Garston Docks to Otterspool Park.

== Transport ==
Cressington railway station is located in the centre of the district, providing Northern Line (Merseyrail) services to Liverpool and Southport.
