= Lightbody =

Lightbody is a surname. Notable people with the surname include:

- Alex Lightbody (born 1966), Irish lawn bowler and British champion
- Gary Lightbody (born 1976), Northern Irish musician and songwriter
- Hannah Greg (née Lightbody, 1766–1834), English mill-owner's wife
- Ian MacDonald Lightbody (1921–2015), Scottish-born Hong Kong civil servant and government official
- Jim Lightbody (1882–1953), American middle-distance runner
- Mary Lightbody (born 1952), American educator and politician
- Robert Lightbody (1802–1874), English amateur geologist
- Simon Lightbody (born 1987), Australian cricket umpire
