= Old Garston River =

Coordinates: 53.34735°N 2.90585°W

The Old Garston River or Garston River, sometimes referred to as the Garston Brook, is a tributary of the River Mersey in Garston, Merseyside, a district of Liverpool. Having been encroached upon by urban development, it is now a subterranean river, culverted for all of its length, although unlike many culverted urban rivers it has not been incorporated into the sewer system.

The mouth of the Garston River was a haven for fishing boats, and probably contributed to the development of the settlement of Garston, around five miles upstream from central Liverpool. The river was fed by two tributaries, a western and eastern. The shorter eastern tributary rose near Allerton. The western tributary rose about a quarter mile north west of the Calder Stones and followed the present line of Mather Avenue, but much of its drainage was intercepted by later drainage works and conveyed more directly to the Mersey. There were once several mills along the river's course, along with two large pools, one of which – Garston Mill – was located on the opposite side of Church Road from St Michael's Parish Church.

Due to a low capacity of its culvert, the Old Garston River still presents an occasional flooding risk and is thought to be responsible for flooding at Woolton Golf Course and other nearby sites.

== See also ==
- Old Dock, Garston
