= Old Dock (disambiguation) =

Old Dock was the world's first commercial wet dock, built on the River Mersey in Liverpool, England.

Old Dock may also refer to:

- Old Dock, Garston, a maritime dock in the Port of Garston on the River Mersey at Garston, Liverpool, England
- Old Dock, Grimsby, later expanded to form the Alexandra Dock
- Old Dock, Kingston upon Hull, a former dock in Kingston upon Hull in the East Riding of Yorkshire, England
