= Otterspool Tower =

Skyscraper proposed for Liverpool, UK

- Artist's impression as shown in the Liverpool Echo in February 1998.
- Interactive map of the Otterspool Tower area

General information
- Status: Never built
- Type: Mixed-use
- Location: Liverpool, United Kingdom, Festival Gardens; Riverside Drive; Liverpool; L17 7EG
- Coordinates: 53.3736968°N 2.9582352°W
- Cost: £750,000,000 (partial)

Height
- Height: 305 m (1,000 ft)

Technical details
- Floor count: 79
- Floor area: 400,000 m^{2} (4,300,000 sq ft)

Design and construction
- Architecture firm: Ruddle Wilkinson
- Developer: Wiggins Group

Otterspool Tower is a name commonly given to a supertall skyscraper that was proposed in Liverpool, United Kingdom. Developers, Wiggins Group, first touted the idea in 1995 before moving forward with the proposal in 1998. Also dubbed the "Scousescraper", the building was set to be 305 m (1,000 ft) high and would have become the tallest building in Europe at the time. It was never built.

Part of a £750 million regeneration vision of the former Festival Gardens site, the "grandiose" tower was planned to be predominantly leisure based, including such features as a 2,500 bed five-star hotel, a theme park and a giant waterfall.

However, following negative reception, the plans were ultimately confirmed scrapped in late 1999; the developers subsequently claimed the proposal had only ever been made to "test the water", rather than being a truly serious concept.

== Site background ==
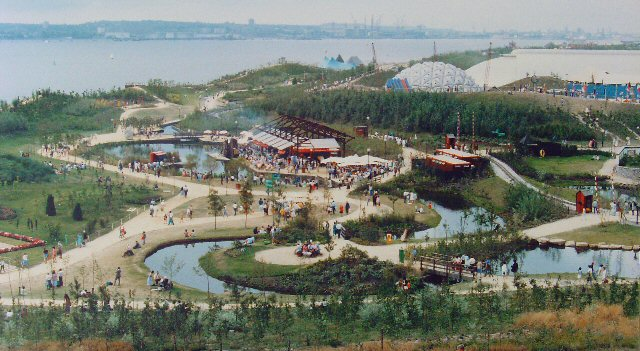
The site during the festival of 1984.

A few miles south of Liverpool city centre, the site is reclaimed land from the River Mersey. Reclamation began in 1957, using domestic and industrial waste as infill; this was an extension northwards of the previously reclaimed Otterspool Promenade. Due to industrial decline in Liverpool, petroleum and oil related industries subsequently established on the new land were eventually abandoned, meanwhile refuse continued to be dumped at the site until 1981. Left derelict, part of the area was developed and landscaped for the city's hosting of the International Garden Festival in 1984. However, there was no strategy in place for what would become of the area after the expo.

Eventually, part of the site was repurposed as an amusement park under the name "Pleasure Island" in 1992.

== Proposal ==
Surrey-based developer, Wiggins Group, bought a 29.4% stake in the site in 1994, with an option to develop the entire site for £6.8 million; this was activated in late 1995 with Wiggins revealing a £200 million idea for the area, including a 1,000 ft tower. Under the terms of the option, Wiggins had one year to formalise and submit plans or forfeit their right to develop. After conceiving multiple proposals, Wiggins submitted outline planning permission in November 1996. However, the tower was not a concrete aspect of the plan and was described as "still under consideration". In early 1997, Wiggins bought out the owners of the site and closed Pleasure Island due to its poor financial performance. The planning application was withdrawn in September.

Wiggins' new plans for the site were reported in the Liverpool Echo in February 1998 – a larger development valued at £750 million. The 1,000 ft tower, previously mulled over, was now definitively part of the masterplan – its centrepiece. This would have made it the tallest building in Europe, 150 ft taller than the then record holder of Commerzbank Tower in Frankfurt, Germany, and one of the top 25 tallest in the world at the time if constructed. The developers claimed the project could create 30,000 jobs. Wiggins said they wanted to create a landmark design for Liverpool following in the footsteps of E. W. Pugin, Giles Gilbert Scott and Frederick Gibberd. Construction would begin after the start of the new Millennium.

The tower was designed primarily as a leisure and tourist attraction. Features were to include a theme park stretching up 30 storeys, to be influenced by Liverpool's musical heritage, complete with a 300 ft tall waterfall and man-made tropical jungle. An "opera house in the sky" was also touted. A total of 400,000 m^{2} of floor space was planned. A quarter was to be reserved for shops (with a view of attracting major American and European anchor tenants), whilst accommodation would involve a 2,500 bed, five-star hotel and penthouse apartments.

== Reaction ==
The plans were initially met with scepticism. Media questioned "the demand for a project of such size and scale" in a city such as Liverpool, the availability of funds, considering Wiggins were only turning a profit of £1 million at the time, and the track record of the key figures behind the venture whose previous plans had rarely materialised; the company claimed it was "not a pie in the sky" scheme. Meanwhile, Labour councillor Louise Ellman praised the ambition and the size of investment and the head of Liverpool Airport, Rod Hill, also welcomed the prospect of extra tourists to the city.

Local media dubbed the tower, "the Scousescraper", a pun combining the colloquial word for a person from Liverpool, Scouser, and skyscraper.

In May 1998, the Liberal Democrats (Lib Dems) became the controlling party of Liverpool City Council after local elections, replacing Labour. Later that month, the Lib Dems came out staunchly against the skyscraper proposal. The site is located close to a suburban residential area; Cllr. Ron Gould stated it would be "a nightmare for the community in the shadow of the site" and asked who "would want to live next door to that?", that it was "not complementary to the local environment". Fellow Cllr. Ed Pheion questioned the evidence that so many jobs would be created. The Lib Dems claimed their preference for the site was for it to be restored as public gardens. Local residents were not consulted by Wiggins before the proposal was announced; a subsequent poll found 98.9% of locals surveyed were against the planned tower; increased traffic congestion and pollution were of primary concern.

== Fate ==
In August 1998, Wiggins announced that Ruddle Wilkinson had been chosen to be the tower's architects. However, by January 1999, plans were described as "on hold" but that talks between Wiggins and the city planning authority were ongoing. By May, it was announced Wiggins were developing "a new blueprint" for the site, in response to criticism from both the council and local residents. In November, with the council steadfastly uncompromising, Wiggins confirmed that a 1,000 ft tower had been officially scrapped from any future plans, claiming the actuality was that it had only ever been part of the original plan to "test the water" and to "see what [would] happen".

Relations between Wiggins and the City Council broke down completely after a third, tower-less scheme was rejected in 2002. Wiggins subsequently offloaded the site to a new leaseholder in 2004. The site would remain undeveloped until 2021, when large-scale remediation works began in preparation for housing.

== See also ==
- King Edward Tower, a cancelled scheme which would have become Liverpool's tallest building
- Shanghai Tower, a cancelled scheme which would have become Liverpool's tallest building
- List of tallest buildings and structures in Liverpool
- List of visionary tall buildings and structures
