= St Austin's =

St Austin's may refer to:

- St Austin's Church, Grassendale, Merseyside, England
- St Austin's Church, Wakefield, West Yorkshire, England
- St. Austin's Military School, a defunct American military academy
- St Austin's Priory, a monastic house in Devon, England
- St Austin's, a fictional school in the works of P. G. Wodehouse
