= Respect 4 All =

Official charity of Liverpool Football Club

Respect 4 All (also written Respect for All) is an official charity of Liverpool Football Club offering free football coaching and sports facilities for disabled people.

The Respect for All Disability Centre opened in September 2008. Free coaching is provided four nights a week indoors at the St Margaret's Cricket and Community Sports Centre in Aigburth, Liverpool. Sessions, open to disabled boys and girls aged between 12-16 and adults, are provided for people with severe learning disorders, visual impairment and physical disabilities (including wheelchair users).

Respect for All is part of Liverpool F.C.'s community outreach work. The project has seen support from former Liverpool players Ian Rush, Robbie Fowler, Brian Hall and Sammy Lee, as well as singers Wayne Hussey and Julianne Regan.
