= St Michael's Church, Garston =

Coordinates: 53.3521°N 2.8970°W

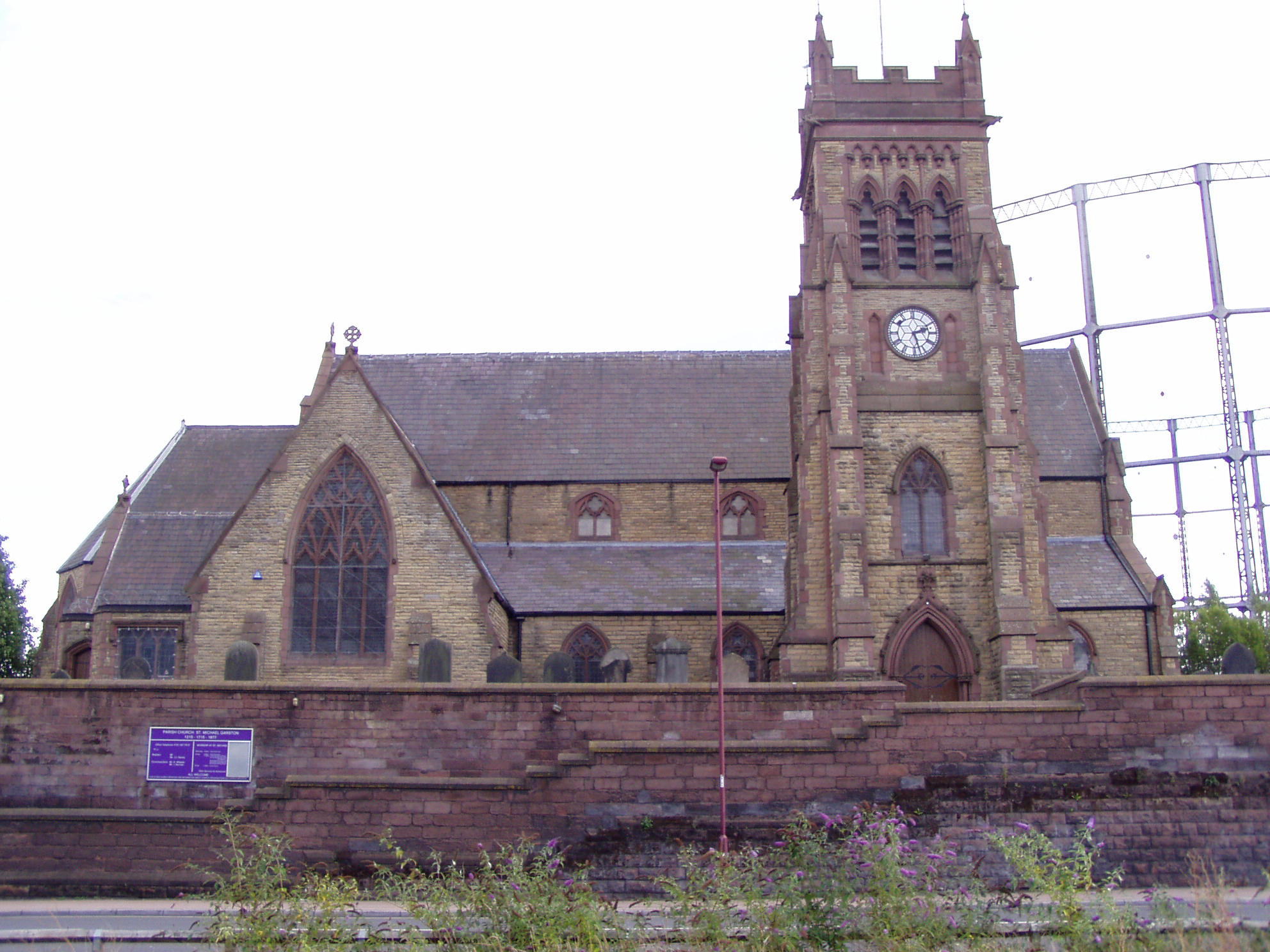
- St Michael's Church, Garston, from the north

- Location in Merseyside
- OS grid reference: SJ 404,843
- Location: Church Road, Garston, Merseyside
- Country: England
- Denomination: Anglican
- Website: St Michael, Garston

History
- Status: Parish church

Architecture
- Functional status: Active
- Heritage designation: Grade II
- Designated: 19 June 1985
- Architect(s): Thomas D. Berry and Son
- Architectural type: Church
- Style: Gothic Revival
- Groundbreaking: 1875
- Completed: 1877

Specifications
- Materials: Sandstone, slate roofs

Administration
- Province: York
- Diocese: Liverpool
- Archdeaconry: Liverpool
- Deanery: Liverpool South Childwall
- Parish: Garston

Clergy
- Vicar: Revd Aly Tunstall

St Michael's Church is in Church Road, Garston, a district of Liverpool, Merseyside, England. It is an active Anglican parish church in the deanery of Liverpool South Childwall, the archdeaconry of Liverpool, and the diocese of Liverpool. The church is recorded in the National Heritage List for England as a designated Grade II listed building. It is located on an industrial site between gas holders and a railway.

== History ==
The first church on the site was built in 1225, and the second in 1715. The present church was built between 1875 and 1877 and was designed by Thomas D. Berry and Son. The church has a historical connection with the Norris and the Watt families of Speke Hall.

== Architecture ==
=== Exterior ===
St Michael's is built in buff rock-faced yellow sandstone with red ashlar dressings and slate roofs. Its plan consists of a nave with a clerestory, north and south aisles under lean-to roofs, a south porch, north and south transepts, a chancel with an apse and chapels, and a northwest tower. The tower has angle buttresses, and a north entrance with a crocketed hood, over which is a two-light window. Above this are clock faces on three sides, three bell openings, a frieze, a cornice, gargoyles, and an embattled parapet. At the west end is a three-light window containing Geometrical tracery, and along the sides of the aisles and clerestory are two-light windows. The windows in the transepts have four lights, and those in the chapels have three lights. The chapel and the porch are gabled.

=== Interior ===
In the church, the reredos has panels containing opus sectile and mosaic. Around the church are Stations of the Cross designed as a frieze by May L. G. Cooksey. In the chancel are windows containing stained glass dated 1886 by Shrigley and Hunt. The original two-manual pipe organ was built by Franklin Lloyd. It has been superseded by another two-manual organ, this installed by Rushworth and Dreaper in 1938, and rebuilt by the same company in 1967.

=== Stained Glass ===
There are nine stained glass windows of which five memorialise members of the Lightbody family situated at the east end of the church behind the altar - from left to right:

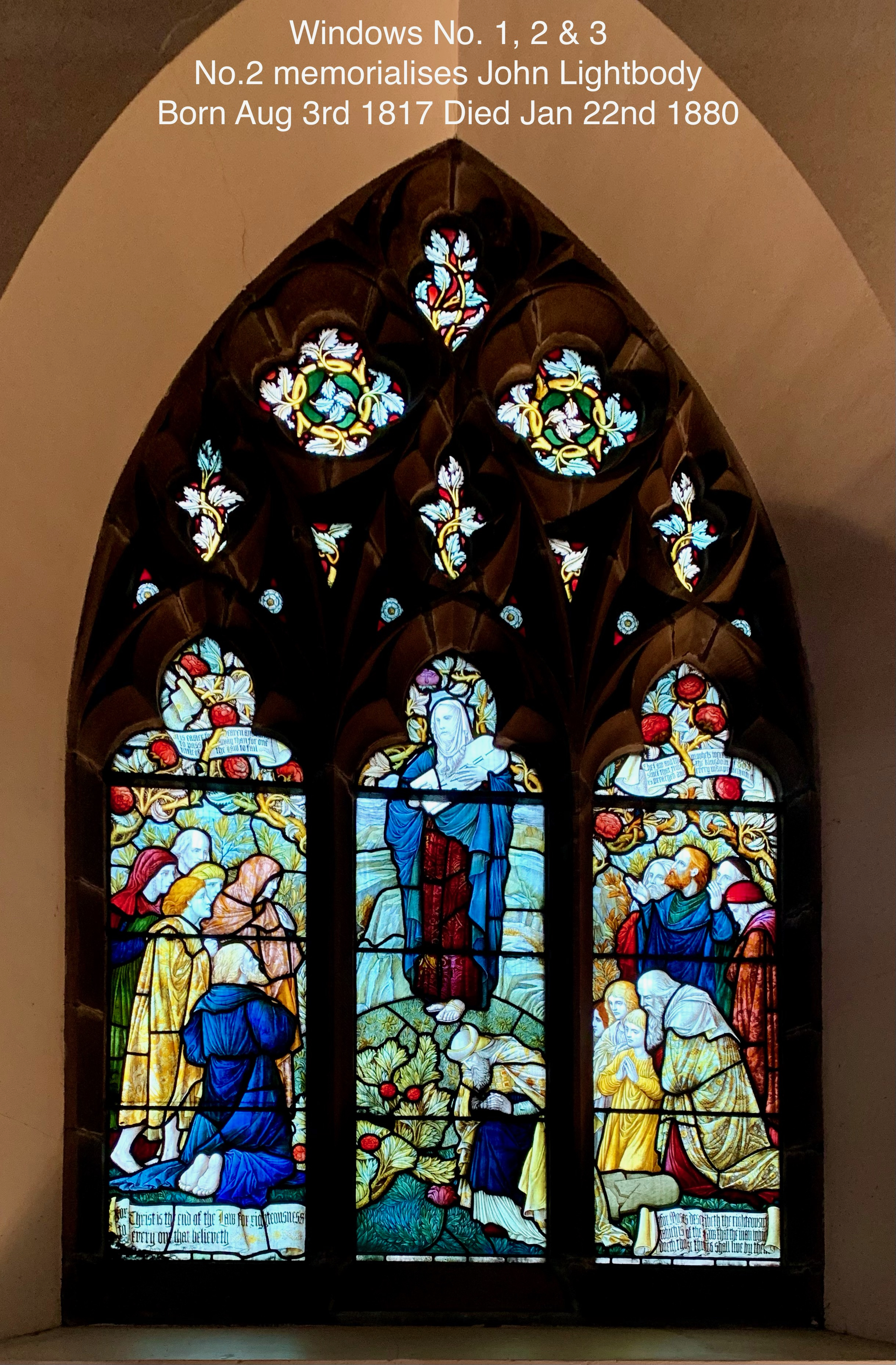
Stained glass window commemorating John Lightbody (1817-1880) at St Michael's Church, Garston

No.2 "To the glory of God & in loving remembrance of John Lightbody Born Aug 3rd 1817 Died Jan 22nd 1880:

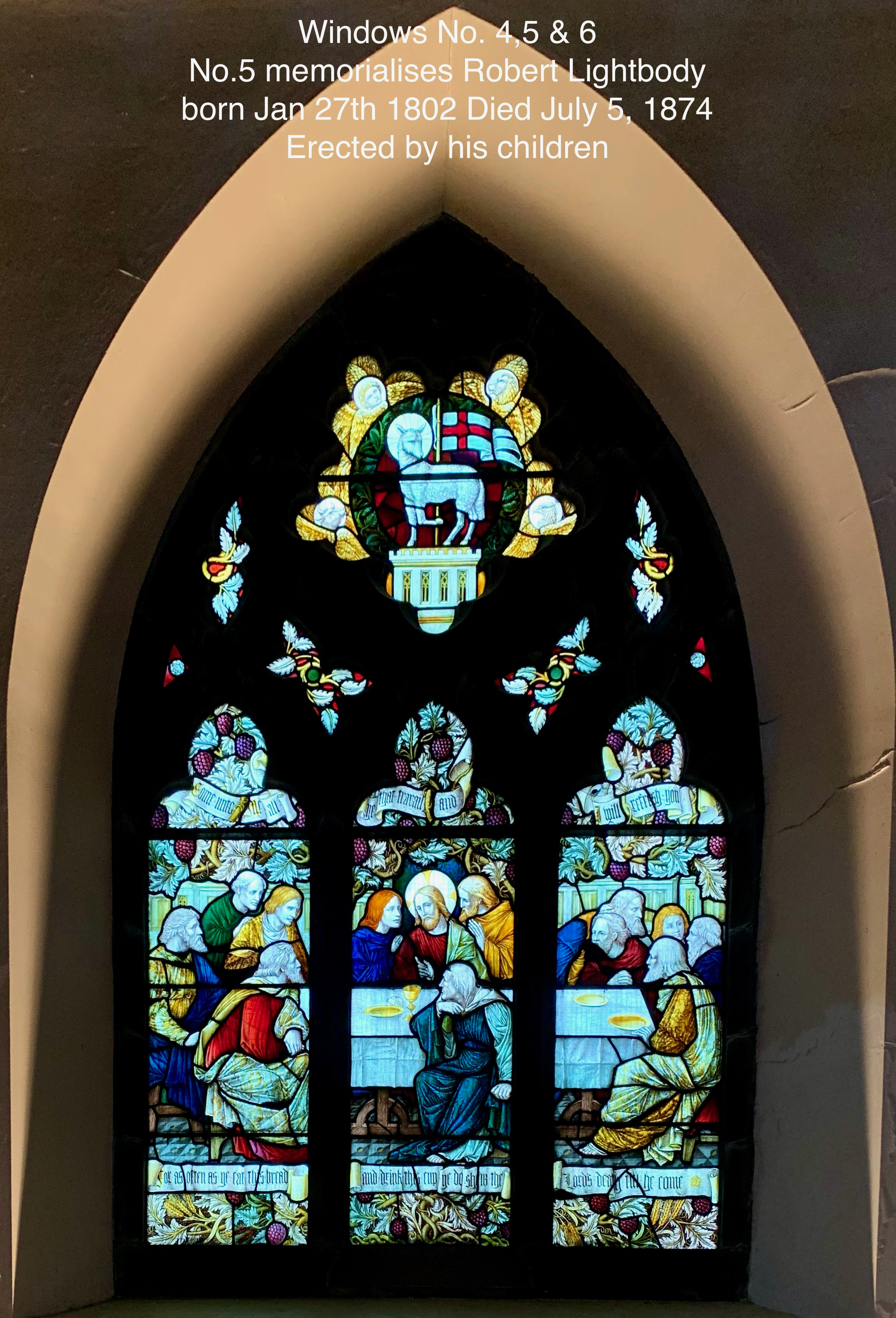
Stained glass window commemorating Robert Lightbody (1802-1874) at St Michael's Church, Garston

No.5 "Robert Lightbody born Jan 27th 1802 Died July 5, 1874 Erected by his children":

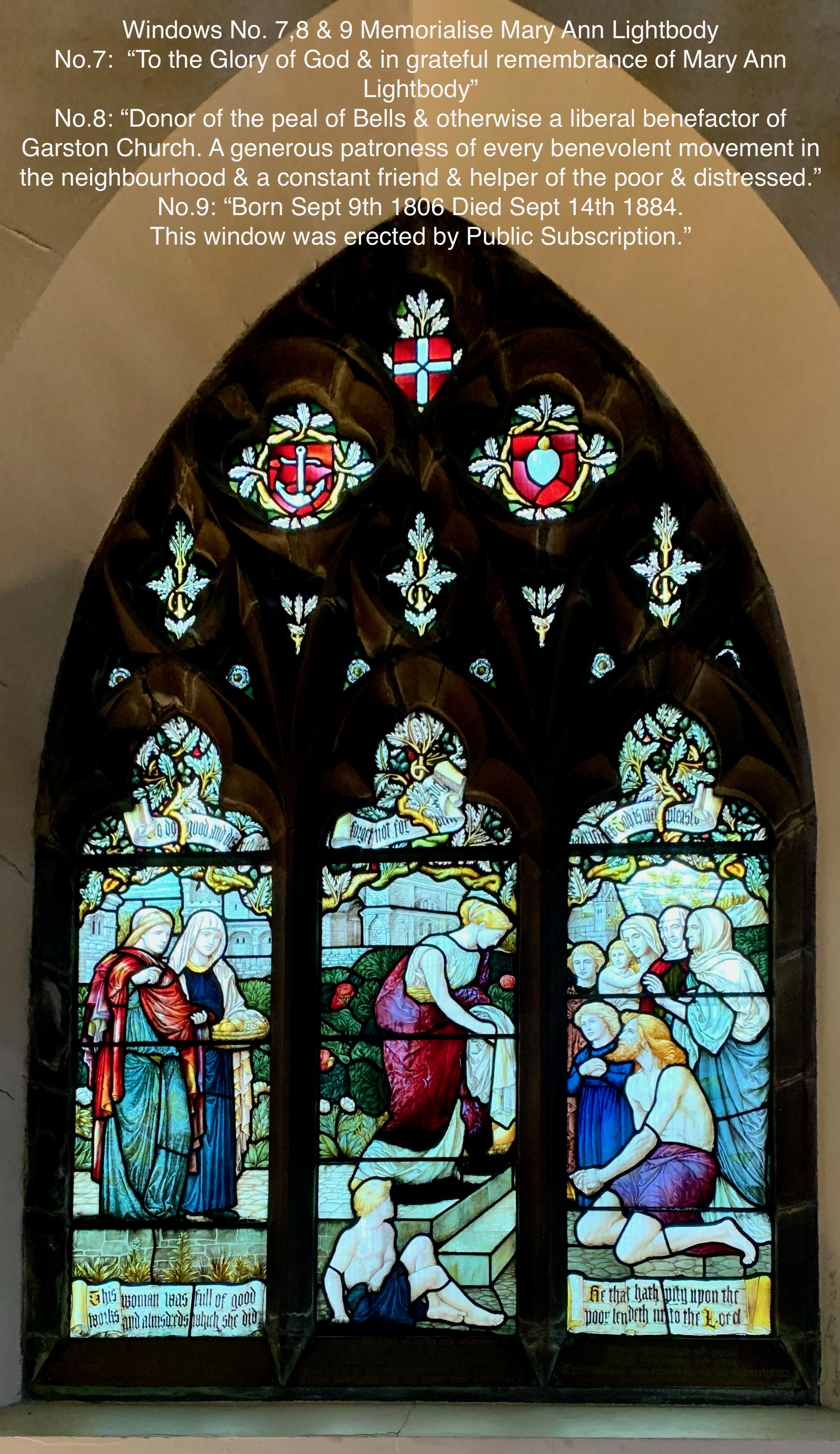
Stained glass window commemorating Mary Ann Lightbody (1806-1884) at St Michael's Church, Garston

No.7 "To the Glory of God & in grateful remembrance of Mary Ann Lightbody": No.8 "Donor of the peal of Bells & otherwise a liberal benefactor of Garston Church. A generous patroness of every benevolent movement in the neighbourhood & a constant friend & helper of the poor & distressed": No.9 "Born Sept 9th 1806 Died Sept 14th 1884. This window was erected by Public Subscription."

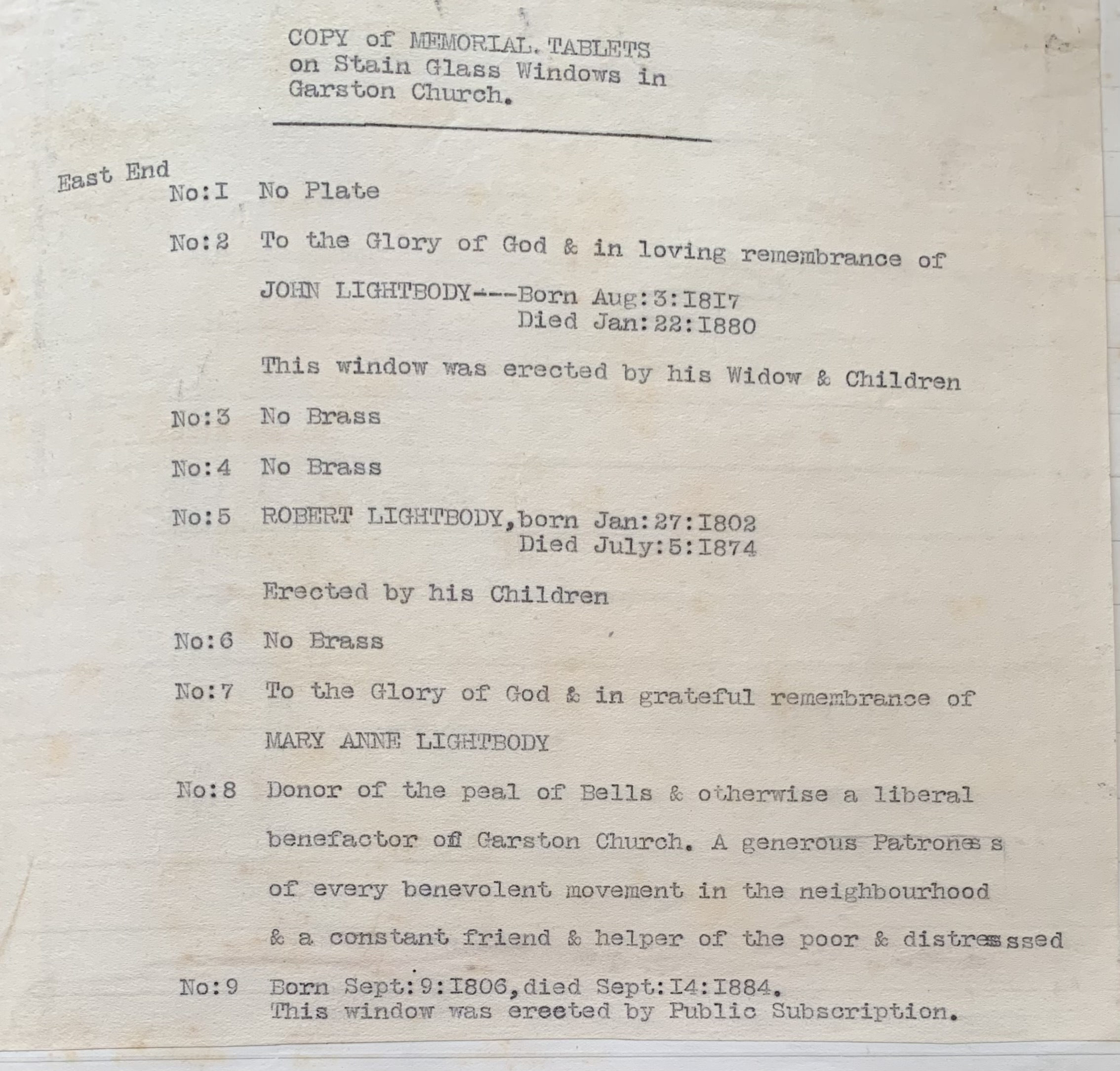
Description of the memorial tablets in St Michael's Church Garston

John, Robert & Mary Ann were children of John Lightbody (1767-1848) & Harriet Hughes (1778-) of Birchfields, Upper Islington, Liverpool & Garston. Robert's contributions to geology & palaeontology in Ludlow are mentioned on the Robert Lightbody Wikipedia page and recorded in Ludlow Museum. John Lightbody (1767-1848) (known at the time as John Lightbody Junior) and his sons John Lightbody (1817-1880) & Robert Lightbody (1802-1874) and his grandson John Henry Lightbody were all members of The Athenaeum in Liverpool.

=== Bells ===
There is a ring of eight bells, cast by John Warner & Sons in 1877 and 1878. The bells were the gift of Miss Mary Ann Lightbody of Garden Cottage, The Avenue, Garston. They were opened Easter Monday April 22, 1878. The Tenor bears the inscription "In memory of John Lightbody who died 1848 aged 80 years". John Lightbody was Mary Ann's father. The bells were retuned and rehung in 1996 as recorded on this plaque but sadly the original donation by Mary Ann Lightbody and memorialisation of the bells to John Lightbody seem to have been forgotten. As the bells were retuned but not recast it is not known whether or not the original inscription on the tenor to John Lightbody subsists.

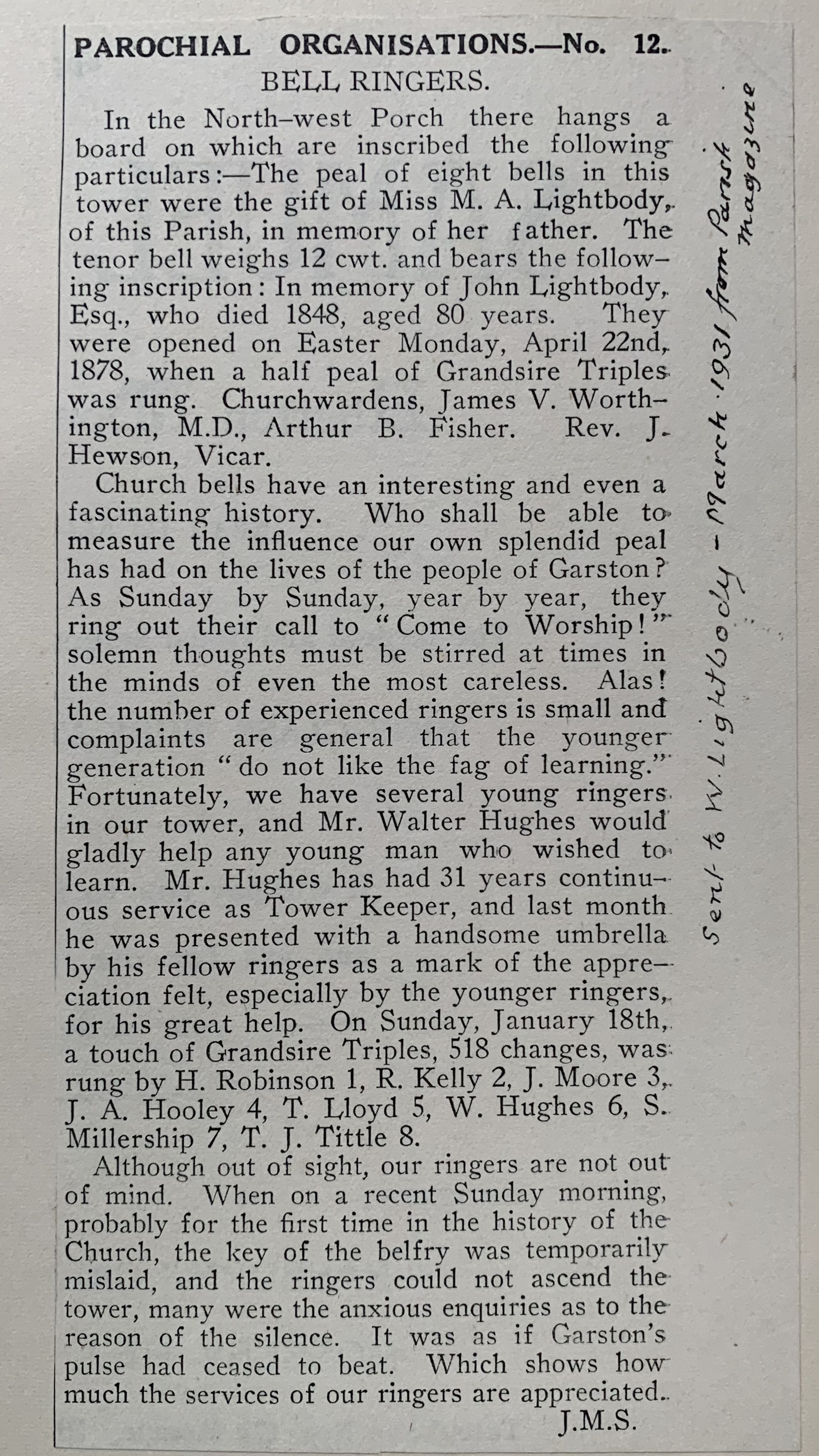

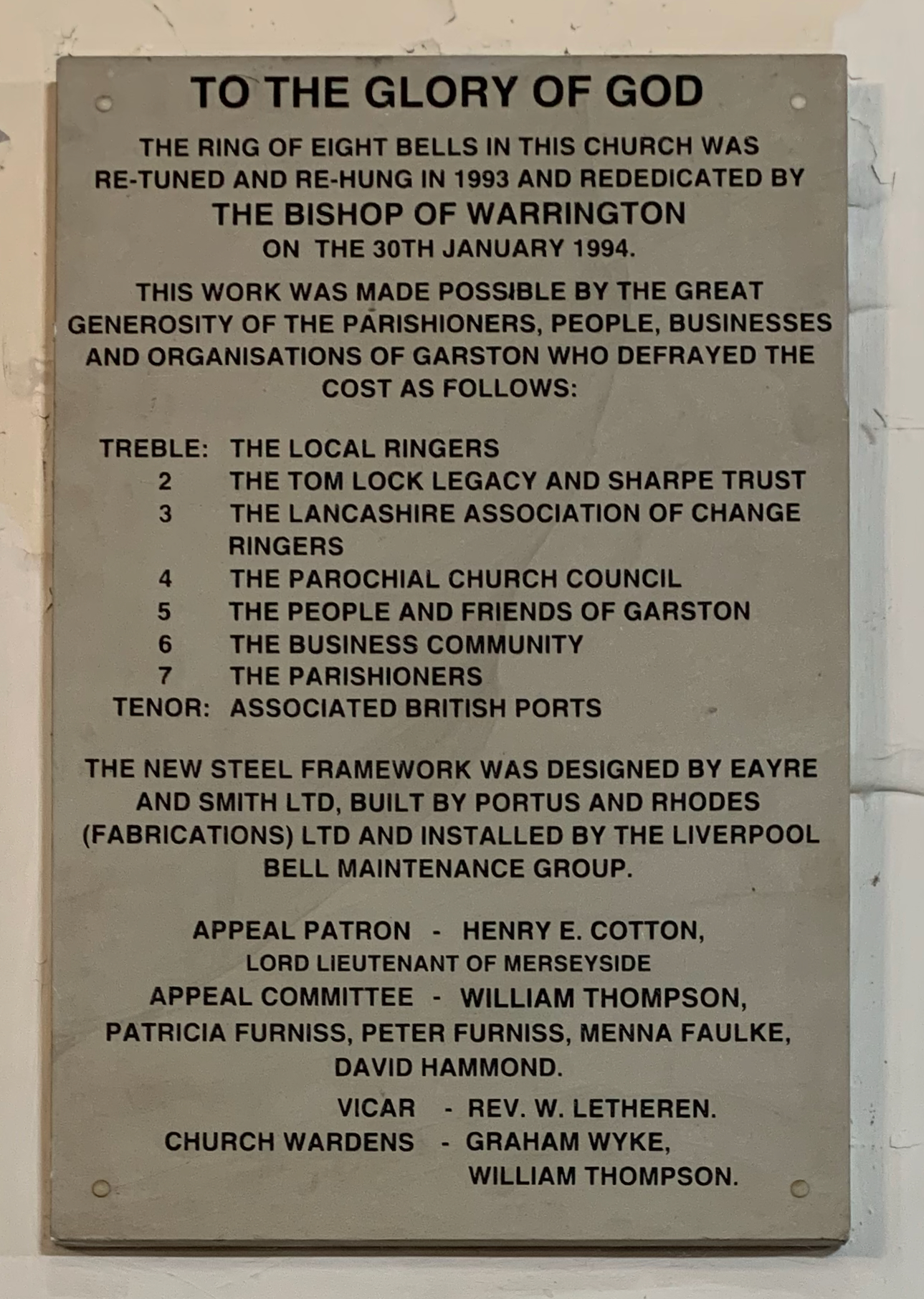
The bells in memory of John Lightbody were retuned and rehung in 1993

There is also a Sanctus bell of 1882 by the same company.

== External features ==
In the churchyard is a shaft, dating possibly from the 17th century, and maybe part of a sundial.

== See also ==
- Grade II listed buildings in Liverpool-L19
