= St Austin's Church, Grassendale =

Coordinates: 53.3613°N 2.9122°W

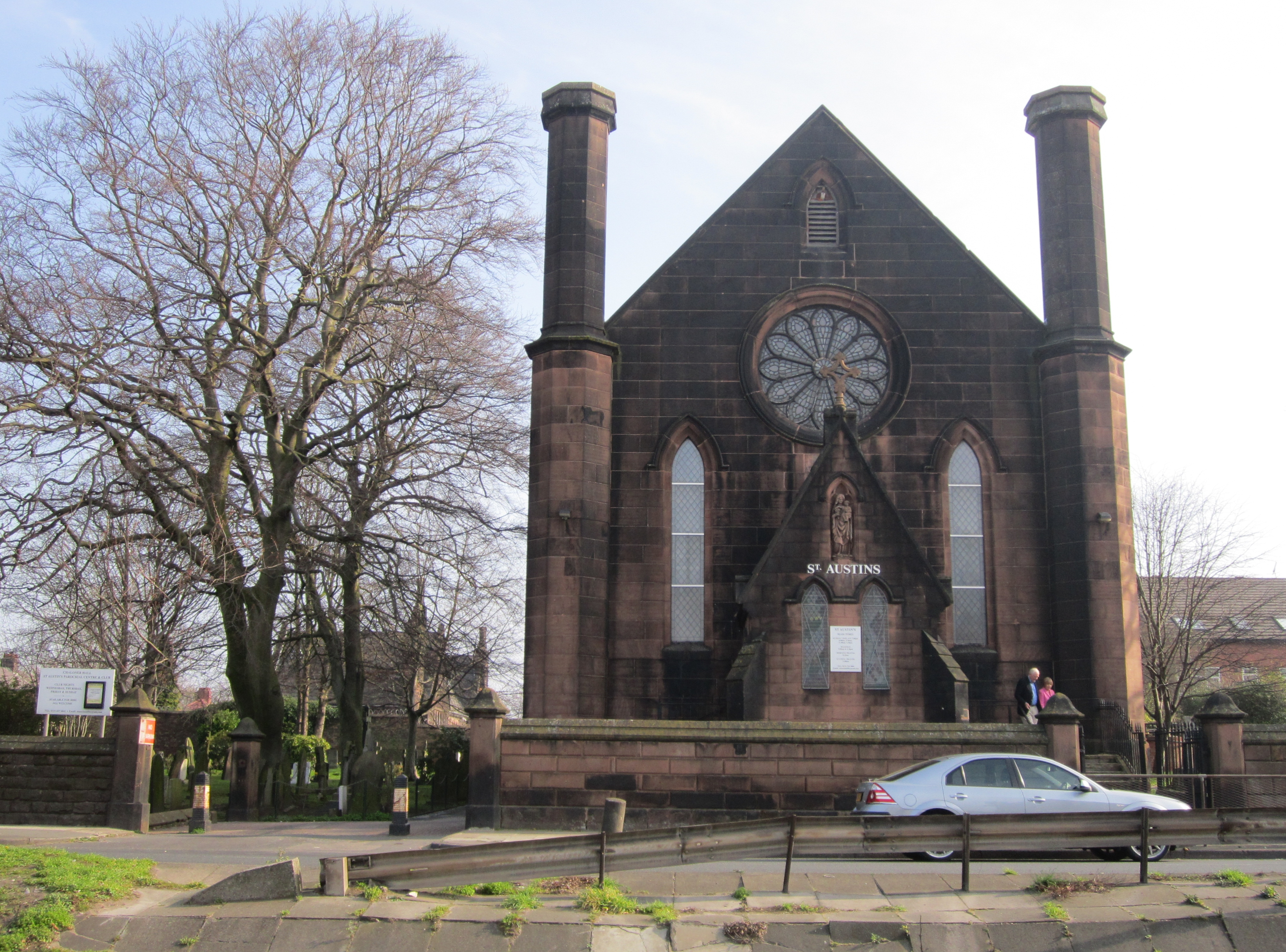
- West end of St Austin's Church

- Location in Merseyside
- OS grid reference: SJ 394 854
- Location: Aigburth Road, Grassendale, Liverpool, Merseyside
- Country: England
- Denomination: Roman Catholic
- Website: St Austin, Grassendale

History
- Dedication: Saint Austin

Architecture
- Functional status: Closed
- Heritage designation: Grade II
- Designated: 19 June 1985
- Architectural type: Church
- Style: Gothic Revival
- Completed: 1838
- Closed: 3 June 2015

Specifications
- Materials: Brick and stone, slate roof

Administration
- Diocese: Archdiocese of Liverpool

St Austin's Church is in Aigburth Road, Grassendale, Liverpool, Merseyside, England. It is a redundant Roman Catholic church in the parish of St Wilfrid's and the Archdiocese of Liverpool. The church is recorded in the National Heritage List for England as a designated Grade II listed building. It was closed in 2015.

== History ==
The church was built in 1838, and its interior was reordered in 2000. From its foundation it was run by Benedictine monks from Ampleforth Abbey until 2012, when it was amalgamated with three other local churches to form a new parish.

== Architecture ==
St Austin's is built in brick with stone dressings, a gabled stone west façade, and a slate roof. The west façade has a protruding gabled porch with diagonal buttresses and two lancet windows, above which is a niche containing a statue. Flanking the porch are lancet windows, and above it is a rose window with iron tracery. At the top of the gable is a louvred lancet. Rising from the corners of the façade are octagonal turrets. The sides of the church have five bays, each containing a lancet window between buttresses.

Inside the church is a west gallery carried on iron columns. A shallow recess forms the chancel, which contains a reredos, above which is a large painting of the Crucifixion. To the left of the chancel is another recess that forms a chapel.

== Associated structures ==
Attached to the back of the church is a presbytery, built in brick with stone dressings and a slate roof. It has three storeys, and extends for three bays. Most of the windows are sashes, apart from one casement window and an oriel window. The presbytery is listed at Grade II. Behind the church is the parish hall, which originated as a school that was built in 1860. It is a single storey building in stone with a slate roof. There are three bays along the sides, the end bays projecting forward under gables. The windows have two and three lights and are mullioned. At the left end is a porch that rises to become a bellcote. The hall is also listed at Grade II.

== Closure ==
The church celebrated its last Mass on 3 June 2015. The Mass was attended by around 250 people and was celebrated by Archbishop Malcolm McMahon. The Archdiocese of Liverpool decided to administer the church for three years after the Benedictine monks from Ampleforth had left in 2012. After that three-year period, the archdiocese decided not to run it permanently as another church, St. Francis of Assisi Church. is less than one mile away. The church remains the property of Ampleforth abbey.

== See also ==
- Grade II listed buildings in Liverpool-L19
