= St Mary's Church, Grassendale =

Coordinates: 53.3598°N 2.9110°W

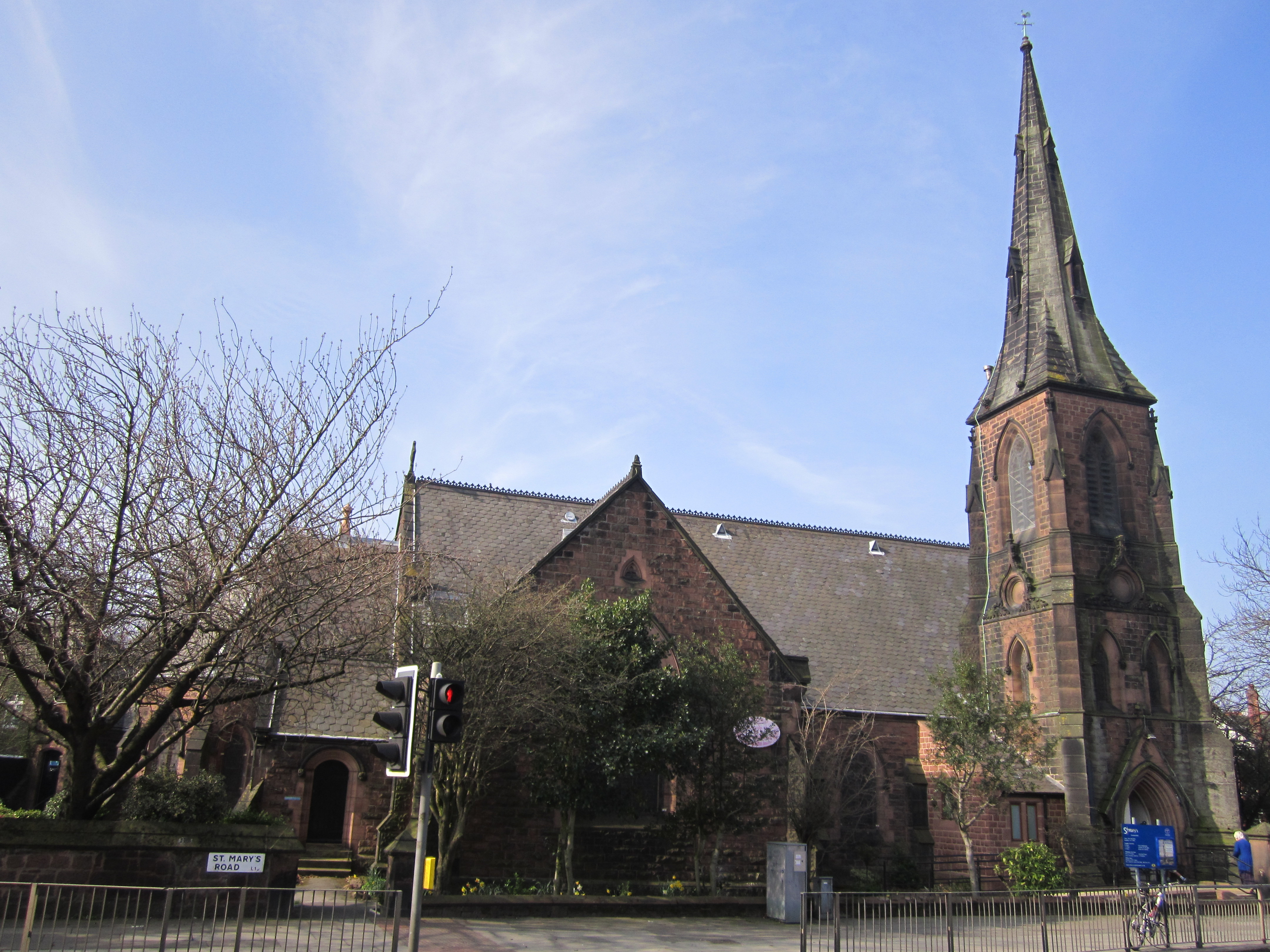
- St Mary's Church, Grassendale, from the north

- Location in Merseyside
- OS grid reference: SJ 395 851
- Location: Aigburth Road, Grassendale, Liverpool, Merseyside
- Country: England
- Denomination: Anglican
- Website: St Mary, Grassingdale

History
- Status: Parish church
- Consecrated: July 1854

Architecture
- Functional status: Active
- Heritage designation: Grade II
- Designated: 14 March 1975
- Architect: Arthur Hill Holme
- Architectural type: Church
- Style: Gothic Revival
- Groundbreaking: 1852
- Completed: 1853

Specifications
- Materials: Stone, slate roof

Administration
- Province: York
- Diocese: Liverpool
- Archdeaconry: Liverpool
- Deanery: Liverpool South Childwall
- Parish: Grassendale

Clergy
- Vicar: Revd Paul Ellis

St Mary's Church is in St. Mary's Road, Grassendale, a district of Liverpool, Merseyside, England. It is an active Anglican parish church in the deanery of Liverpool South Childwall, the archdeaconry of Liverpool, and the diocese of Liverpool. The church is recorded in the National Heritage List for England as a designated Grade II listed building.

== History ==
The church was built in 1852–53 to serve the residents of the newly created private estates of Grassendale Park and Cressington Park. It was designed by Arthur Hill Holme. The foundation stone was laid on 2 September 1852, and the church was consecrated in July 1854 by the Bishop of Chester. It was designed to provide seating for 700 people.

== Architecture ==
=== Exterior ===
St Mary's is constructed in stone, and has a roof of hexagonal slates. Its architectural style is Decorated. The plan consists of a broad nave without aisles, wide north and south transepts, a short chancel with a canted apse, a southeast vestry, and a northwest tower with a broach spire. The windows along the sides of the nave have two lights, and at the west end is a three-light window flanked by two-light windows. The transepts have diagonal buttresses, three-light windows to the north and south, and two-light windows on the east and west sides. The central window in the chancel has three lights, and the flanking windows have two lights. The windows contain Geometric tracery. The tower has diagonal buttresses, and an entrance on the north side above which is a hood mould, its stops carved with heads. In the stage above are two-light windows and roundels with crocketed ogival hoods. In the top stage are two-light bell openings, and on the spire are two tiers of lucarnes and a weathervane.

=== Interior ===
Inside the church, the laminated timber beams of the roof form a flying cross at the crossing. The stained glass includes three windows in the chancel of 1884 by Evans, and the west window of 1953 was designed by Joseph Edward Nuttgens. The two-manual pipe organ was built in 1903 by Norman and Beard. When the church was built, it had a ring of six bells, but these were rehung for chiming in 1938.

== See also ==
- Grade II listed buildings in Liverpool-L19
