= Robert Lightbody =

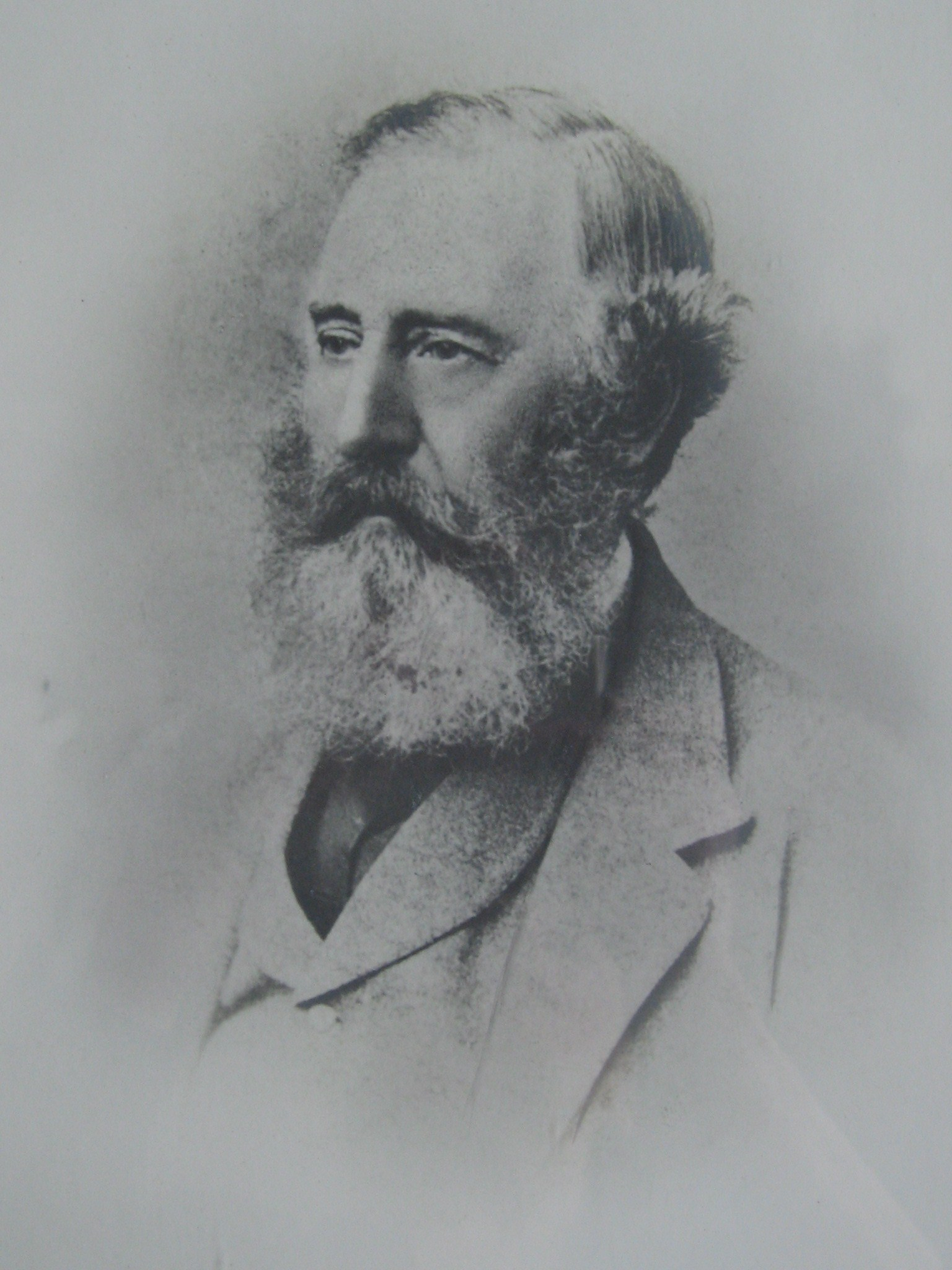
- Nineteenth century print
- Born: 22 January 1802; Liverpool, Lancashire
- Died: 5 July 1874 (aged 72); Ludlow

Academic work
- Main interests: Geology

Robert Lightbody (22 January 1802 – 5 July 1874) was a British amateur geologist and member of the Ludlow Natural History Society.

== Early life ==
Lightbody was born in Liverpool in 1802. His parents, John Lightbody and Harriet Hughes, were non-conformists and members of the Unitarian Church. In 1829, Lightbody still had links with the Liverpool area when he was bound as a clerk to George Ashby Pritt, Liverpool attorney. In 1840, he married Jane Peele in Shrewsbury, and by 1841, he moved to Llanllwchaiarn in Montgomeryshire, Wales. During his time in Wales at least four of his six children were born, and he was a significant landowner. In 1852, after a short return to the Liverpool area he moved to Castle Square House, Ludlow, the substantial residential property which he eventually purchased and settled in with his family until his death.

== Geological activity ==
After moving to Ludlow in 1852, Lightbody soon became an active member of the Ludlow Natural History Society, replacing Edward Rogers as a committee member in 1853. Throughout the years of his membership Lightbody is notable for his dedication to the society. His name appears as an attendee at almost all of the AGMs, and he is often one of the few members listed as present when meetings were cancelled or postponed due to insufficient numbers.

Lightbody was elected to the Woolhope Naturalists' Field Club in 1855, and served as its president in 1861. He was also a member of the Severn Valley Naturalists' Field Club and of the Caradoc Field Club (which merged). In 1863, he read a paper at the Ludlow meeting of the Severn Valley Naturalists' Field club titled The Geology of Ludlow, which was later published in the Club Transactions.

J.W. Salter records that Lightbody was responsible for discovering the earliest known Pteraspid in the Welsh Borders, Archaegonaspis ludensis. He is also credited by Murchison for the detection of the remains of fishes and crustaceans in beds at a higher level than the original Ludlow bone-bed in the railroad cutting to the north-east of Ludlow.

Lightbody published several articles based upon his geological research, including The Geology of Ludlow, Remarks on Mr Roberts' Paper on Cephalaspis, Notice of a Section at Mocktree, Passage Beds at Downton, and A Sketch of Geological Time,

== Ludlow gentleman ==
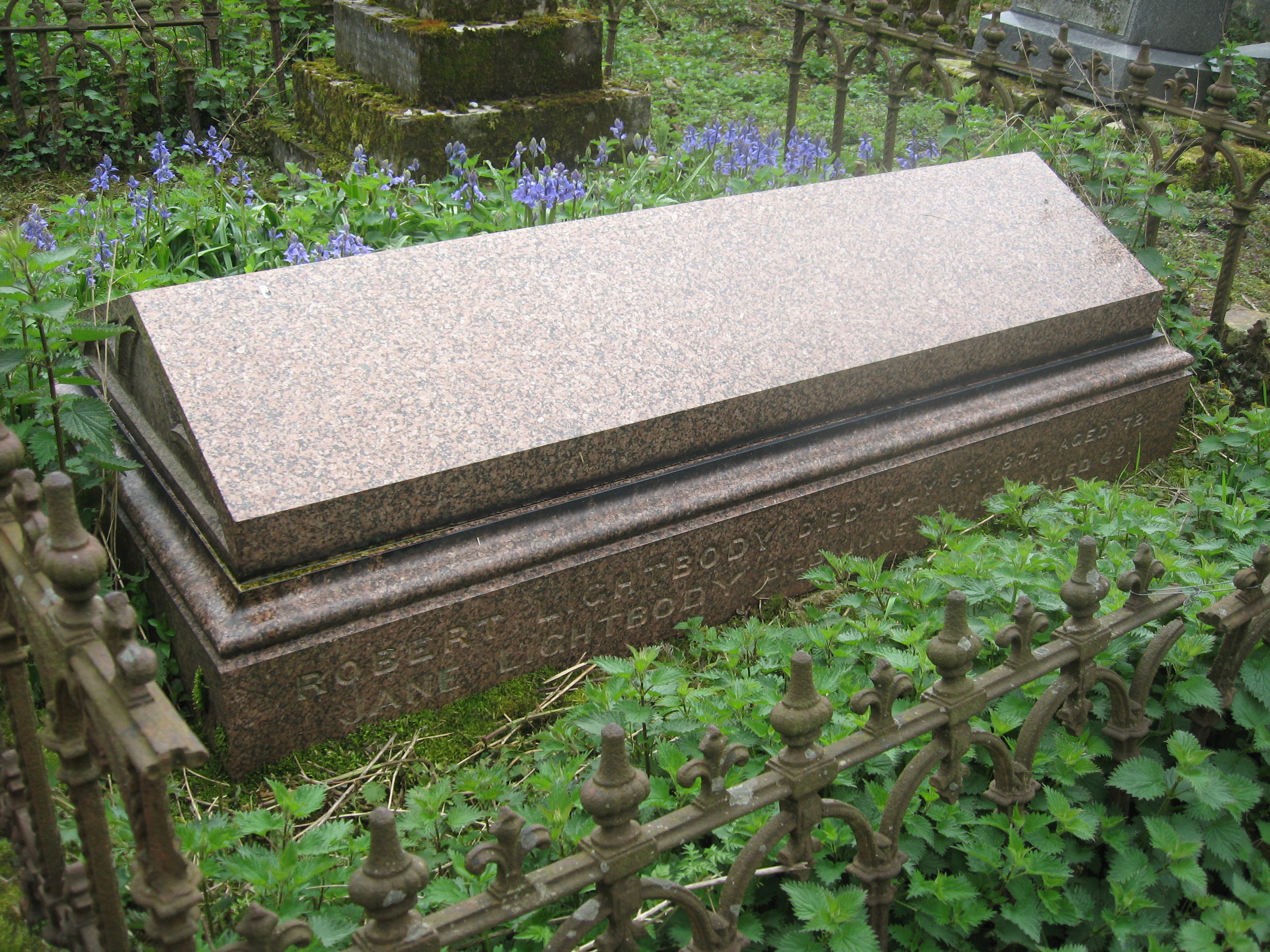
The Grave of Robert Lightbody

Lightbody was involved in a legal dispute with one of his neighbours in 1868, in which he accused Chaplin Hodges, the owner of a local iron foundry, of attempting to undermine his Castle Square House property in Ludlow using explosives.

== Death and posthumous reputation ==
Robert Lightbody died in Ludlow on 5 July 1874, aged 72. He is buried in St Leonard's Churchyard, Ludlow. His contribution to geology is recorded in the footnotes of more famous men, rather than in monograph works under his own name, but should not be under-estimated. Some of the leading geologists of his day corresponded with Lightbody, and credited him with the discovery of specimens upon which they built their theories. As a member of the Ludlow Natural History Society Lightbody was generous with his time, expertise and specimens. Without such men Ludlow Museum (one of the first of its kind) may very well have closed its doors very early in its history, and our knowledge of the geology of Shropshire, and most particularly of the important Ludlow Beds, would be a great deal poorer. He is memorialised with his brother John Lightbody of Birchfield, Liverpool and his sister Mary Ann Lightbody of Garden Cottage, Garston in St Michael's Church, Garston.
