= Otterspool Promenade =

Open space in Liverpool, United Kingdom

Coordinates: 53.368°N 2.948°W

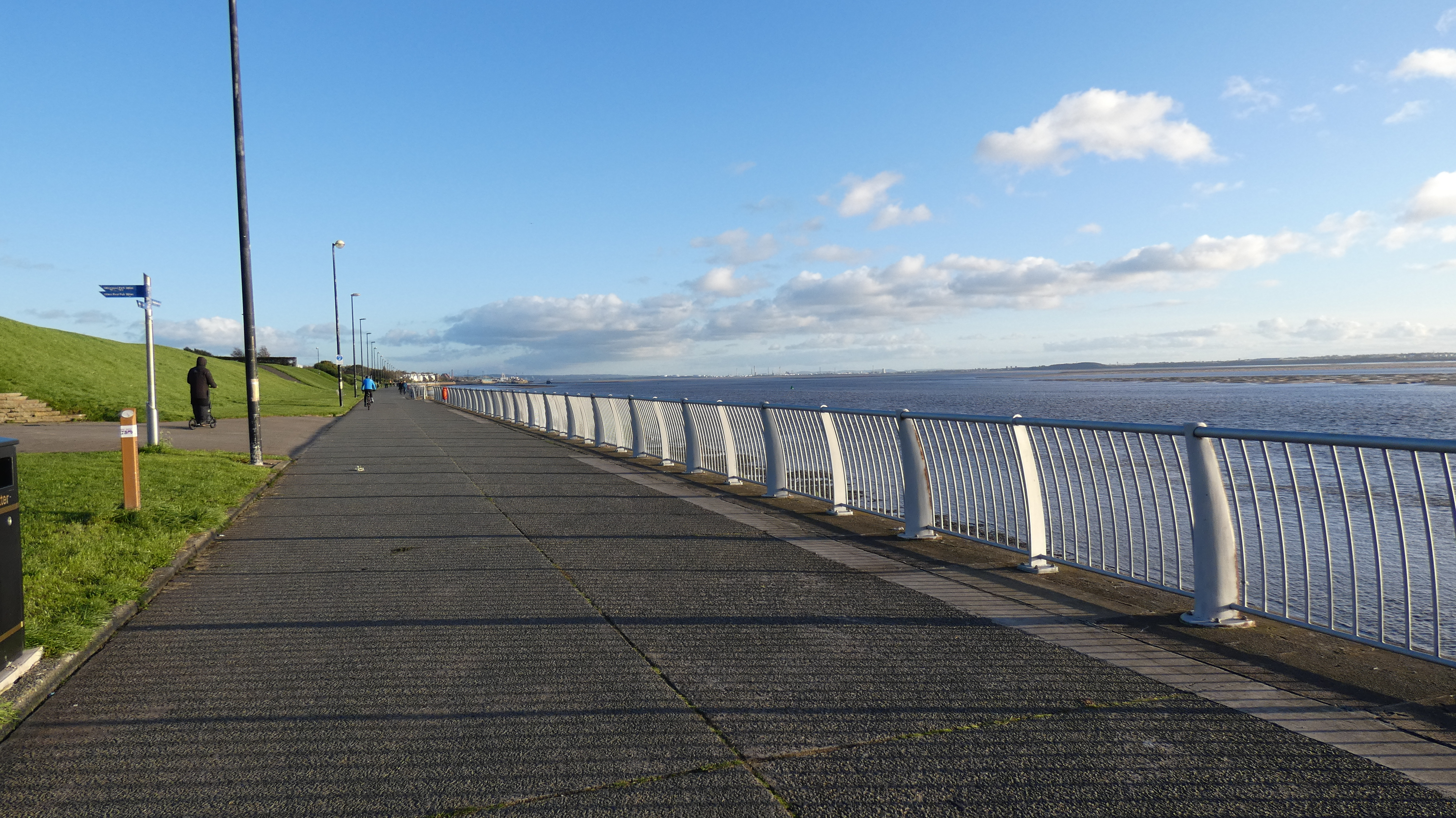
- Otterspool Promenade in October 2019
- Interactive map of Otterspool Promenade
- Type: Riverside walk, parkland
- Location: Liverpool, England
- Open: 1950

Otterspool Promenade is a riverside walk and accompanying area of parkland in the Aigburth and Grassendale districts of Liverpool, England. The promenade runs along the bank of the River Mersey from just north of Garston Docks to Otterspool Park. A narrower footpath and cycling lane continue north along the riverbank to the city centre, ending at the Albert Dock. The promenade adjoins the former private parkland estates of Cressington Park, Fulwood Park and Grassendale Park. It is notable for the excellent views it gives of shipping in the Mersey and over the river to the Wirral.

Opened in 1950, it was built by landscaping a site that had been used for disposal of household waste, and for spoil from excavation of the Queensway tunnel under the Mersey in the 1920s. The stated desire of the local authorities was, "Firstly... provide a place where the citizens of Liverpool can enjoy their leisure in pleasant surroundings on the banks of the Mersey estuary. Secondly... for providing a large area where the essential need to the community for the disposal of its refuse could be met economically and by the use of hygienic and up-to-date methods." Renovations of the promenade were undertaken in 2006 and 2007, including the creation of a children's playground. The renovations were opened in 2007 with a plaque commemorating Liverpool's 800th anniversary.

After several years of campaigning by skateboarders, rollerbladers, and BMXers, the promenade had a concrete skate park installed, which was completed in May 2015. To the north of the promenade on the riverbank was the 1984 International Garden Festival site.

Toward the end of the Otterpool promenade stands the Sitting Bull sculpture by Dhruva Mistry, commissioned for the 1984 International Garden Festival.
