= Garston, Liverpool =

District of Liverpool, England

Coordinates: 53.351°N 2.894°W

Garston
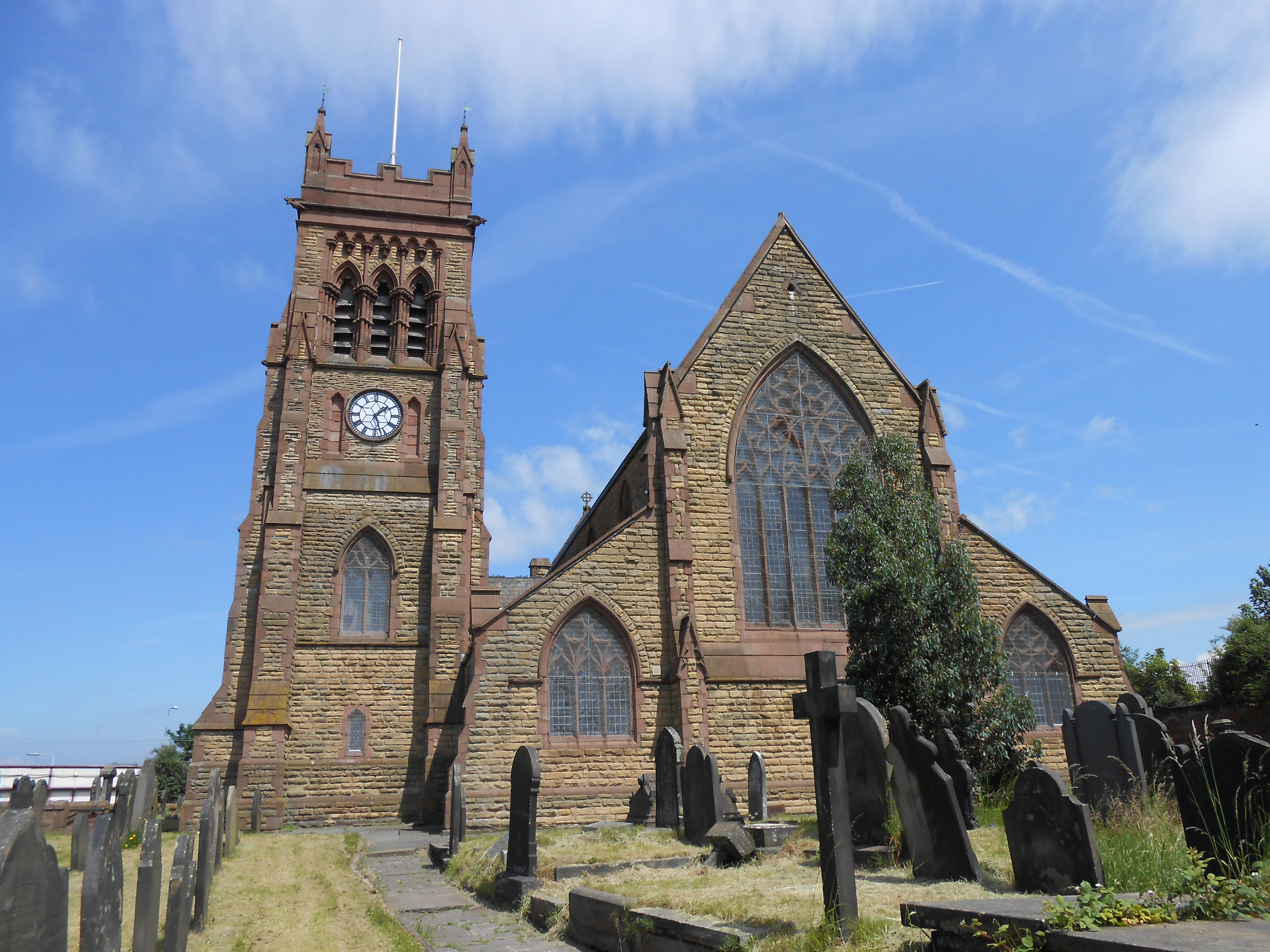
- St Michael's Church, Garston

- Location within Merseyside
- OS grid reference: SJ405842
- Metropolitan borough: Liverpool
- Metropolitan county: Merseyside
- Region: North West
- Country: England
- Sovereign state: United Kingdom
- Post town: LIVERPOOL
- Postcode district: L19
- Dialling code: 0151
- Police: Merseyside
- Fire: Merseyside
- Ambulance: North West
- UK Parliament: Liverpool Garston

Garston is a district of Liverpool, in Merseyside, England. Historically in Lancashire, it is bordered by the suburbs of Aigburth, Allerton, and Speke. It lies on the Eastern banks of the River Mersey.

== History ==
In medieval times, Garston was home to a group of Benedictine monks. The first recorded mention of settlement in Garston is of the Church of St Michael in 1235. By the 19th century, the area had become a small village. Garston was formerly a township and chapelry in the parish of Childwall, in 1866 Garston became a separate civil parish, from 1894 to 1902 Garston was an urban district, on 1 April 1922 the parish was abolished and merged with Liverpool. In 1921 the parish had a population of 28,729.

A small dock was first built at Garston in 1793 for Blackburne's Saltworks, which still stands today.

Garston's growth accelerated rapidly in the 1840s, when in 1846, the area's first dock was constructed and opened, under the auspices of the St Helens and Runcorn Gap Railway Company. The "Old Dock" was followed twenty years later by a second, the "North Dock." The third and final dock, Stalbridge, was opened in 1907. In 1903, Garston was incorporated into the City of Liverpool. The population expanded as migrants flooded in to work on the docks, especially from Ireland.

== Description ==
Today, Garston is a shipping and container port, with the Port of Garston second only to Liverpool Docks in the North-West. Although inside the city of Liverpool, Garston Docks are not a part of the Port of Liverpool and is regarded as a separate port. Much of the area is also residential, housing being mainly in Victorian terraces with semi-detached homes around Liverpool South Parkway.

Garston is partnered with the nearby district of Speke in a series of redevelopment and regeneration schemes, which have succeeded in reversing trends in dereliction and unemployment, and house prices have continued to rise.

== Etymology ==
Grazing settlement root

Gaerstun, meaning 'grazing settlement' or 'grazing farm' in Old English, is one possible root of the name.

Garston as a name of a place may have its etymology informed by both Old English and Norse. The area that Garston was part of during the Viking Danelaw period would have been influenced by Norse speech. When Vikings settled they would sometimes change names because of speech difficulties. For example, the Saxon name for the city Eoforwic was changed to Jorvik. Shelton, was altered to Skelton, though the old English of 'ton' meaning settlement was retained attesting to the development of language over time.

Spear root

Gar', from Old English (spear, dart, javelin, shaft, arrow, weapon) from Norwegian and Icelandic (spear) and Old Norse geirr (spear, arrow), may suggest that the name of Garston is a combination of Viking and Old English. Another meaning of the name has been suggested as being Gar' (Great) ston' (stone). Therefore meaning "Great Stone". A name possibly meaning the place where spears or arrows were made. In the Anglo Saxon period the forests belong to landowners and their subjects. It wasn't until the coming of William in 1066 that the 'Forest Law' was introduced which claimed woodland as the hunting grounds for kings. Woodland covered approximately 15% of England in 1086 (this had dwindled to just 5.3% in 1905).

Neither of these names may be exclusive and whilst they may have a different etymological ancestry they may simply because of the way language develops have a common history. The etymology of 'garden' is the same as yard and garth and derives from the Old English 'geard', meaning enclosure or hedge. So a hedged enclosure is the exact definition of a garden just as it is of a field.

Etymological conclusions

Geardton (Old English field) or Geirrton (Old Norse spear) or Garton (Old English spear, weapon), all omit the S. S is used in Modern English to suggest plural and possessive. Nouns, noun phrases and some pronouns generally form a possessive with the suffix 's'. This form, is sometimes called the Saxon genitive, reflecting the suffix's derivation from a genitive case ending in Old English (Anglo-Saxon; a clitic).

This suggests at least two possible roots. Firstly one based on grazing as not geographically specific, unlikely to be fenced in, within the periods we are dealing with and secondly one based on specific activity or activities at a given point in a general location spear or arrow or weapon making, which is linked to a settlement, So a settlement where arrows were made is Geirr(s)ton or as it is now known, Garston, e.g. "the place of the arrows".

== Transport ==
Garston is home to Liverpool South Parkway railway station, a major interchange station opened in 2006 replacing Garston (1874–2006). Trains operate at regular intervals to the city centre, Southport, Manchester and Birmingham, and other locations. The 86 and 86A bus routes provide regular bus services from Liverpool South Parkway to the surrounding districts and the city centre. A regular bus shuttle to Liverpool John Lennon Airport is available from Liverpool South Parkway railway station.

== Attractions ==
Garston was home to the 'New Slaughterhouse Gallery' on St. Mary's Road, which aimed to promote local artists as well as community regeneration in partnership with the Garston Embassy on Wellington Street but is now closed. Cressington and Grassendale Parks are nearby, and there is a public swimming pool on Long Lane.

A former venue, the Winter Gardens (since demolished), opposite the police station in Heald Street, hosted concerts, dances and other public events.

== Football ==
In 1935, when Garston and indeed much of the south of Liverpool was expanding due to the mass development of council housing to replace inner city slums, as well as the significant development of private housing, the new South Liverpool F.C. was formed in 1935 to serve the area and set up base at the Holly Park stadium in Garston. The club went on to win the Welsh Cup in 1939 (despite being an English side and playing in the English non-league systems) and won a host of non-league football competitions over the next 50 years. However, they were forced to sell Holly Park after a fire in 1989 and folded in 1991, only to reform as a junior side in various locations in and around the city before settling at a site in Otterspool in 2000.

Although South Liverpool were never successful in their many applications to join the Football League, many of their players went on to play for Football League sides; most notably striker John Aldridge and midfielder Jimmy Case, who won major trophies in the great Liverpool sides of the 1970s and 1980s. Aldridge, locally born but of Irish descent, was also a Republic of Ireland international regular in the late 1980s and early to mid-1990s, representing his adopted country at two World Cups.

== Cultural references ==
In Episode 2: "Days 8 to 16" of the Peter Jackson documentary, The Beatles: Get Back, whilst recording in the Apple Corps studio, there is a humorous exchange between Paul McCartney and John Lennon with the latter asking in mock voice, "Are you talking to me?". It concludes with the McCartney response "The most together man in Garston".

The Beatles were very familiar with Garston as it is the village directly between Harrison's home in Speke and McCartney's in Allerton. In fact the McCartney home had installed a telephone line with a Garston exchange prefix. This was later referenced in the George Harrison recording "Miss O'Dell" from 1973. The song ends with Harrison saying "Garston six nine double two". 6922 was the telephone number for the McCartney family home at 20 Forthlin Road, Liverpool, in the late 1950s and early 1960s.

"I remember the great excitement at 20 Forthlin Road when we had the phone put in. I still remember the phone number: Garston 6922. George still remembers it. It's ingrained."

—Paul McCartney
Many Years From Now, Barry Miles

A house in Garston was used in creating the artwork for the Arctic Monkeys album Favourite Worst Nightmare. The house and estate have been demolished and new houses occupy the site.

== Notable residents ==
- John Aldridge, professional footballer
- Billy Ashcroft, professional footballer
- Peter Atherton, inventor and cotton machinery manufacturer
- Paul Connolly, professional footballer
- Alex Corina, artist and community worker
- Les Dennis, television personality
- Tony Dodson, professional boxer
- Billy Fury, singer and songwriter
- Dan Haggis, drummer for the Wombats
- Jack Jones, trade union leader
- Liz McClarnon, singer
- Ray McFall, owner of the Cavern Club who first booked the Beatles
- Kevin McLeod, professional footballer
- Steve Morgan, founder of Redrow and former owner of Wolverhampton Wanderers
- Simon O'Brien, actor, presenter, and cyclist
- John Parrott, professional snooker player
- Alan Parry, sports commentator
- Pete Price, radio personality
- Isabel Abraham Ross, suffragist, pacifist and teacher
- Barry Sloane, actor
- Rita Tushingham, actress

== See also ==
- Port of Garston
- Old Garston River
