= Aigburth =

Suburb of Liverpool, England

Coordinates: 53.367°N 2.942°W

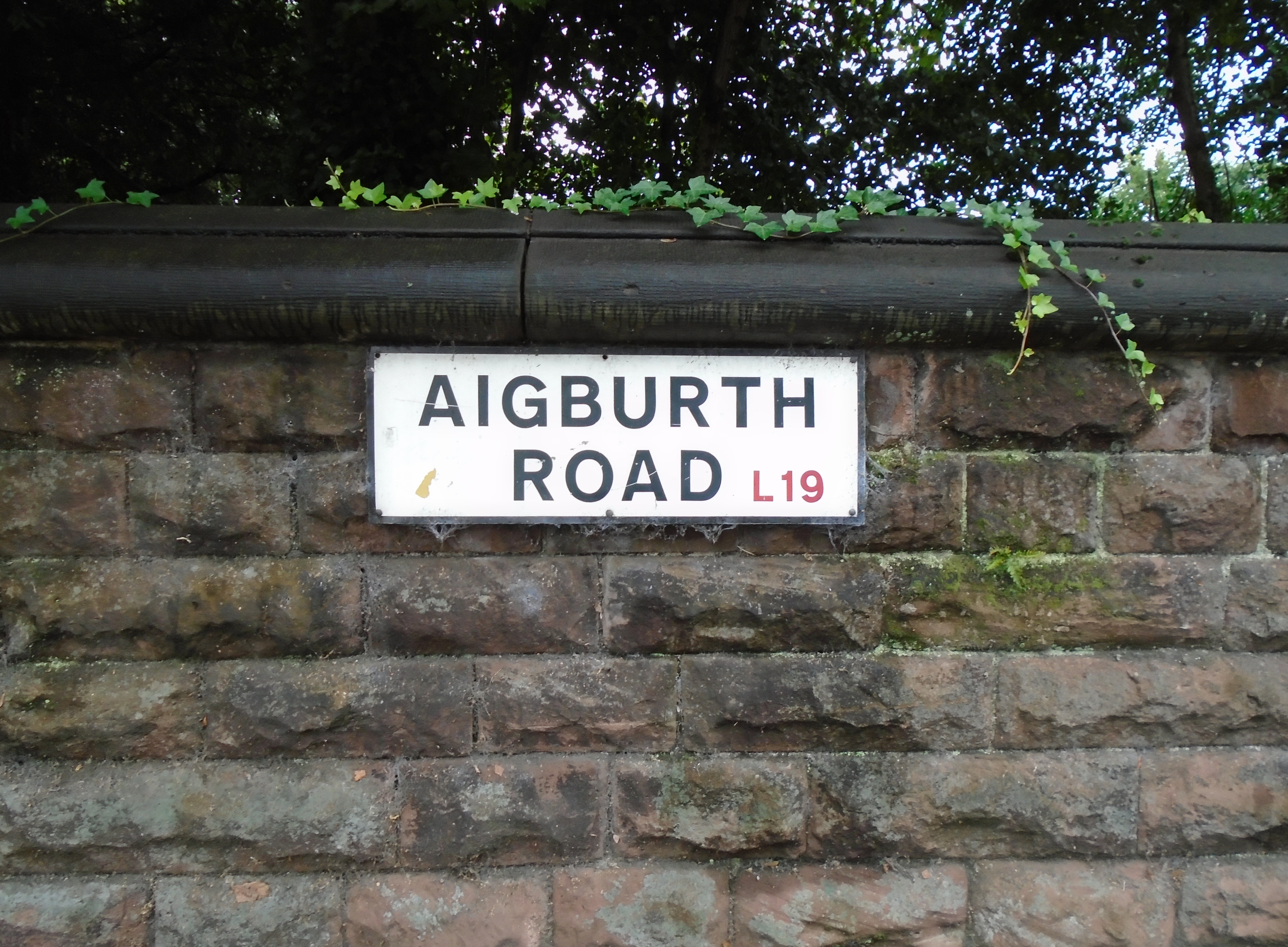
- Aigburth Road sign

- Location within Merseyside
- OS grid reference: SJ385864
- Metropolitan borough: City of Liverpool
- Metropolitan county: Merseyside
- Region: North West
- Country: England
- Sovereign state: United Kingdom
- Post town: LIVERPOOL
- Postcode district: L17, L19
- Dialling code: 0151
- Police: Merseyside
- Fire: Merseyside
- Ambulance: North West
- UK Parliament: Liverpool Riverside

Aigburth (/ˈɛɡbərθ/) is a suburb of Liverpool, England. Located to the south of the city, it is bordered by Toxteth and Dingle to the north, Mossley Hill to the east, and Garston to the south, with the River Mersey forming its western boundary.

== Description ==
Historically a part of Lancashire, Aigburth is mainly residential and covers an area following Aigburth Road (A561) and the areas either side of it until it reaches Garston. The suburb is to the south of Sefton Park and adjoins Otterspool Park, which leads to Otterspool Promenade on the Mersey. Housing in the district is mostly a mixture of terraced and semi detached homes, with large detached houses (mostly converted into flats or hotels) in Aigburth Drive overlooking Sefton Park and modern estates containing detached and semi detached houses in the Riverside Drive area. Lark Lane (between Aigburth Road and Sefton Park) is a lively place with many independent shops, restaurants and bars. The Guardian published an article about Aigburth in 2007 in its 'Let's move to ...' series.

== Etymology ==
The name can be interpreted as "hill where oak trees grow" and is a hybrid place-name: the first part of the name is from Old Norse eik meaning "oak tree" (which is found in Eikton in Cumbria and Eakring in Nottinghamshire) and Old English beorg or berg meaning hill but as there is no real hill in Aigburth the sense here is more likely to be rising ground. Beorg or berg is more usually rendered -borough (as in Barlborough in Derbyshire) or more rarely as -barrow (as in Backbarrow in Cumbria). The name was also recorded as Eikberei in an undated record.

A possible other meaning of Aigburth is Aiges' Berth, meaning the place where the Viking Aiges berthed his long boat. This is plausible because Aigburth is right on the Merseyside river mouth and not on a hill. The nearby hill has a Viking name Toxteth, which means the camp of Toces.

The spelling Aigburgh (or, more rarely, Aighburgh) is sometimes found in old publications and historical documents (for example, S. Lewis, A Topographical Dictionary of England (1848)), as well as in modern references to former residents and is occasionally seen as an alternative (if incorrect) spelling today.

== Governance ==
The area was previously part of the Mossley Hill parliamentary constituency and, as such, returned David Alton (now Lord Alton of Liverpool) for many years. It is now part of the Liverpool Riverside constituency and returned Louise Ellman as MP in the 2005 and 2010 general elections. The current MP is Kim Johnson.

The area is covered by the Liverpool City Council wards of Aigburth and Mossley Hill. The current councillors are Paul Ruddick and Rob McAllister-Bell.

== Parks and Green spaces ==
- Sefton Park
- Otterspool Promenade
- Festival Gardens, once home to the International Garden Festival.

== Landmarks ==
- Liverpool Cricket Club
- Sudley House
- Church of St Anne, Aigburth
- Stanlawe Grange
- Lark Lane

== Education ==
The Aigburth Park halls of residence of Liverpool Hope University are located close to the railway line on St Michael's Road. Up towards Mossley Hill are the former University of Liverpool Carnatic Halls of Residence built in between Elmswood and Carnatic Roads. These are closed, pending redevelopment. On the piece of land between Mossley Hill Road and Barkhill Road is the IM Marsh Campus of Liverpool John Moores University, where the Faculty of Education, Health and Community is based. Secondary schools in Aigburth include St Margaret's Church of England Academy and Auckland College, a private school for ages 5–18. State primary schools in Aigburth are Sudley Infants and Sudley Juniors as well as St Michael-in-the-Hamlet Primary.

Prior to the reorganisation of secondary education in Liverpool in the 1980s, Aigburth was also home to Aigburth Vale Comprehensive School for Girls, formerly Aigburth Vale High School for Girls, which merged with Quarry Bank School to form Calderstones School.

== Transport ==
The area is served by Aigburth railway station on the Northern Line of the Merseyrail network, located some distance from larger residential areas. St Michaels railway station is also situated in the area, at the bottom of Southwood Road.

== Sport ==
South Liverpool F.C., Liverpool Cricket Club, a regular home venue of Lancashire County Cricket Club, and Sefton Park Cricket Club, are located in Aigburth.

St Margaret's Cricket and Community Sports Centre houses Respect 4 All, an official charity of Liverpool Football Club offering free football sports coaching for disabled people.

== Notable residents ==
- Gary Ablett, professional footballer at both Liverpool and Everton football clubs.
- Benjamin Howard Baker Everton player and Olympian.
- Peter Beckett, musician and composer.
- Cyril Bibby, sexologist and educationalist.
- Ronald Brittain, Sergeant Major of the Guards.
- Peter Calvocoressi, wartime codebreaker, historian, author, publisher.
- Hollie Cavanagh, British-born American singer
- John Leslie Chadwick, original bassist, Gerry & the Pacemakers
- Kenneth Cranston, dentist and England cricketer.
- Gloria Grahame, Hollywood actress.
- Dixie Dean, professional footballer for Everton Football Club.
- Harold Garnett, first class English cricketer.
- Gillian Gibbons, teacher and Sudanese prisoner
- Augustus Radcliffe Grote, born in Aigburth, noted entomologist and author
- George Holt, shipowner and merchant
- Gérard Houllier, manager of Liverpool Football Club from 1998 to 2004
- Alfred Lewis Jones, shipowner, philanthropist
- Gillian Kearney, actor
- Billy Liddell, professional footballer for Liverpool Football Club
- Dave Lister, fictional television character in BBC Television's Red Dwarf
- Danielle Lloyd, former Miss England and Miss Great Britain
- Florence Maybrick, convicted murderer, wife of James Maybrick, cotton broker, murder victim and Jack the Ripper suspect
- George Melly, jazz/blues singer, Surrealist art collector and writer
- Elliot Morley, former MP
- Alun Owen, Playwright
- Steven Norris, former MP and businessman
- John E. Owens, Liverpool born American comedian.
- Brian Reade, Daily Mirror journalist
- Nicholas Robinson, Lord Mayor of Liverpool 1828-1829
- Geoff Rowley, professional skateboarder
- Sonia, singer
- Stuart Sutcliffe, artist, Beatle
- Richard Synge, 1952 Nobel Prize winner, (Physics)
- Banastre Tarleton, MP and cavalry commander in American War of Independence
- Ricky Tomlinson, actor
- Alfred Waterhouse, architect of the Natural History Museum and other noted public buildings
- Chelcee Grimes, British singer and songwriter and also a footballer currently playing for Fulham Ladies
- Pete Wylie, English singer/songwriter and guitarist, best known as the leader of the band variously known as Wah!
- Guillem Balagué, Spanish football journalist, pundit on Sky Sports and has also written for British and Spanish newspapers
