= Port of Garston =

Docks on the River Mersey, Liverpool, England

Coordinates: 53.351°N 2.907°W

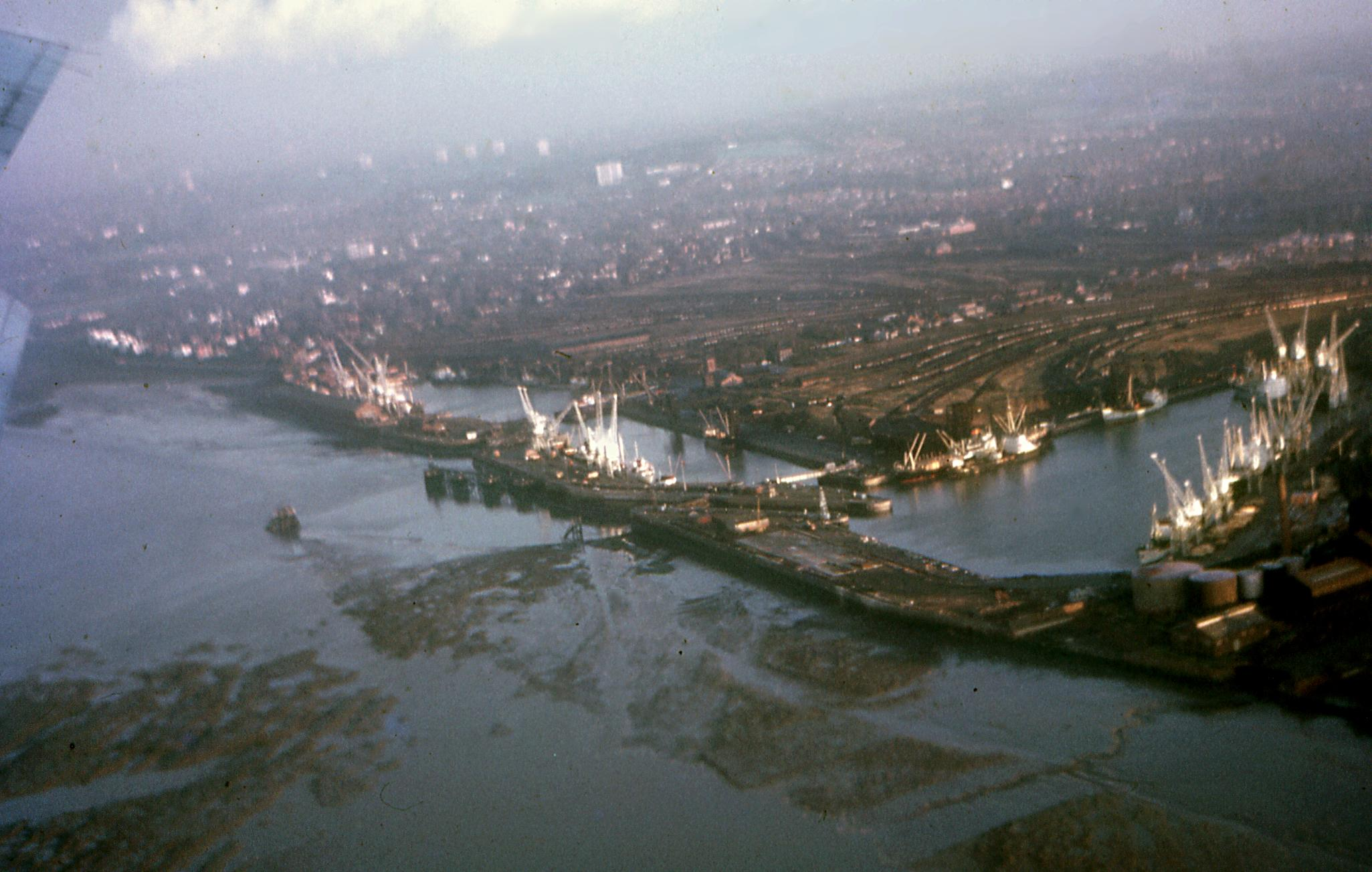
Garston Docks, Liverpool, 1962

The Port of Garston, also known as Garston Docks, is an enclosed tidal dock system on the River Mersey at Garston, approximately 6 miles (9.7 km) from the centre of Liverpool, England. It is operated by Associated British Ports who are the Harbour Authority. Peel Ports as Competent Harbour Authority for the River Mersey provide pilotage for any non-exempt vessels calling at the port.

== History ==
The first dock to be built at Garston was built in 1793 for Blackburne’s saltworks. The docks today were originally set up by the St. Helens and Runcorn Gap Railway Company in June 1853. It contains Old Dock, North Dock and Stalbridge Dock. Old Dock was the first to open in 1853, followed by North Dock in 1875 and then Stalbridge Dock in 1909.

By 1936 the 3 docks had 28.5 acres (11.5 ha) of water, 70 miles (110 km) of sidings, 80 acres (32 ha) of storage and dealt with about two million tons of goods a year.

== Present day ==
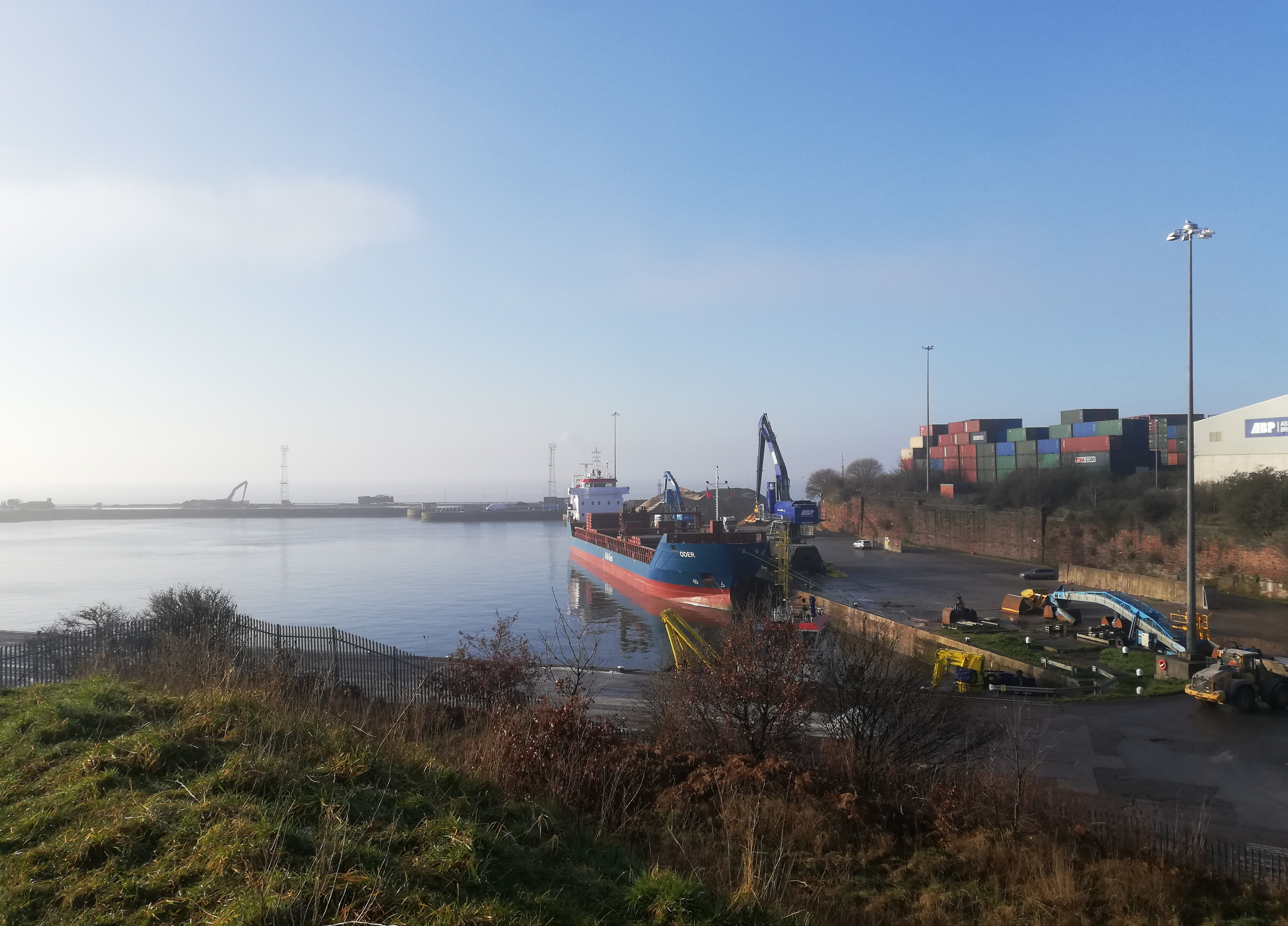
Stalbridge Dock, January 2020

The present site covers 65 acres (26 ha) and a has quay length of nearly 2,00 metres. The port handles around 500,000 tonnes of cargo a year and has facilities for handling grain, steel, scrap metal and has 8,500sqm of multi-purpose cargo storage.

Between 2012 & 2017, ABP invested several million pounds in essential investment, replacing lock gates, additional storage facilities and the purchase of new crane capacity. In 2020, the port invested in 20,000 square feet of warehousing and sixteen storage bays to increase its capacity for handling 60,000 tonnes of aggregates a year.
