= Liverpool city centre =

Central district of Liverpool, England

Coordinates: 53.407°N 2.992°W

- Central business district
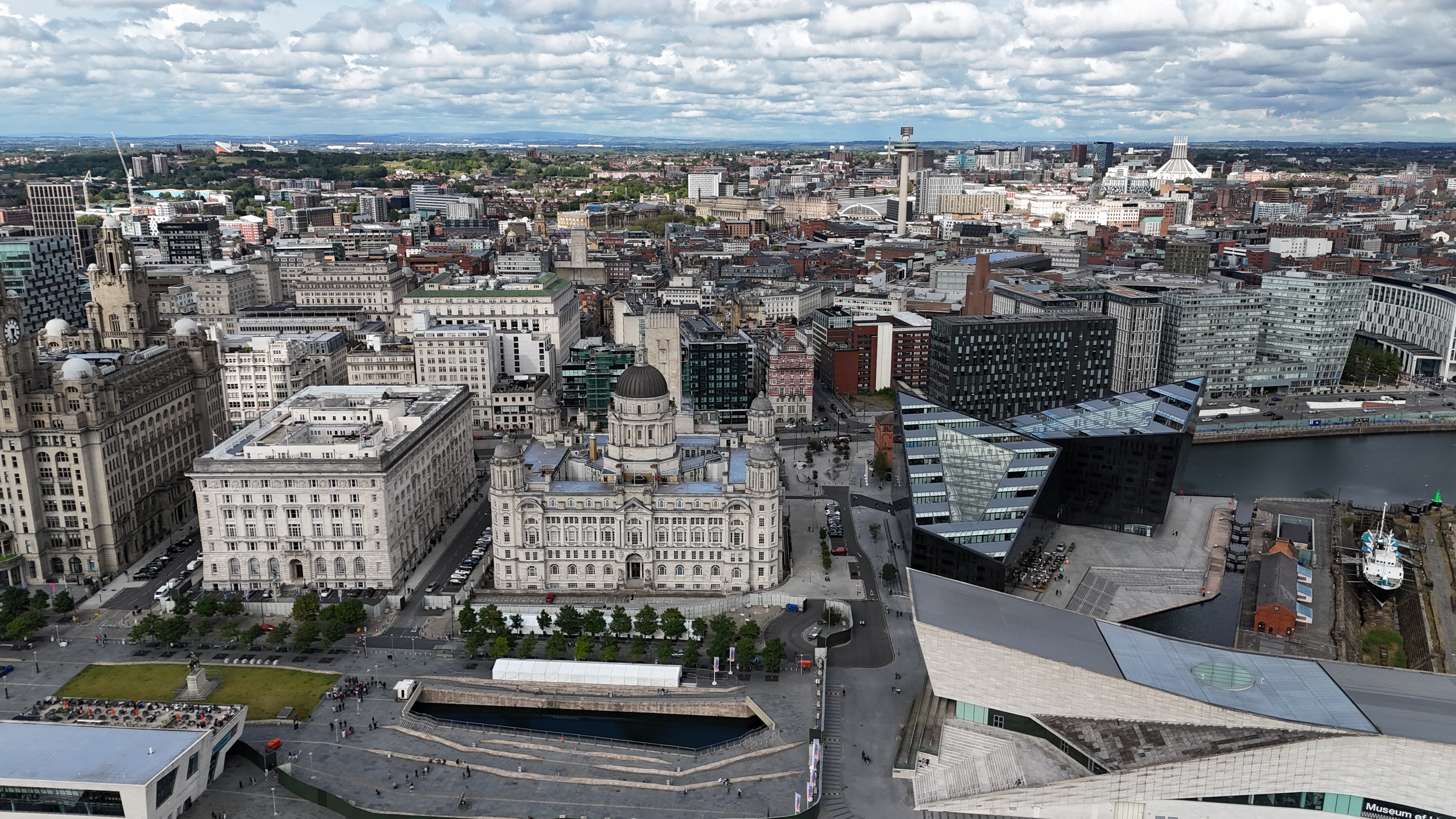
- Skyline view of Liverpool city centre

- Location within Merseyside
- Population: 36,770
- Metropolitan borough: City of Liverpool
- Metropolitan county: Merseyside
- Region: North West
- Country: England
- Sovereign state: United Kingdom
- Post town: Liverpool
- Postcode district: L1,2,3,6,7,8
- Dialling code: 0151
- Police: Merseyside
- Fire: Merseyside
- Ambulance: North West
- UK Parliament: Liverpool Riverside

Liverpool city centre is the administrative, commercial, cultural, financial and historical centre of Liverpool and the Liverpool City Region, England. There are different definitions of the city centre for urban planning and local government; however, the boundary of Liverpool city centre is broadly marked by the inner city districts of Vauxhall, Everton, Edge Hill, Kensington and Toxteth.

At the 2023 United Kingdom local elections, the population of Liverpool city centre was 36,770 based on the five electoral wards that officially make up the city centre. In 2022, the Liverpool BID company reported that there were 78 million visits to the city centre.

== Definitions ==
=== Liverpool local plan ===
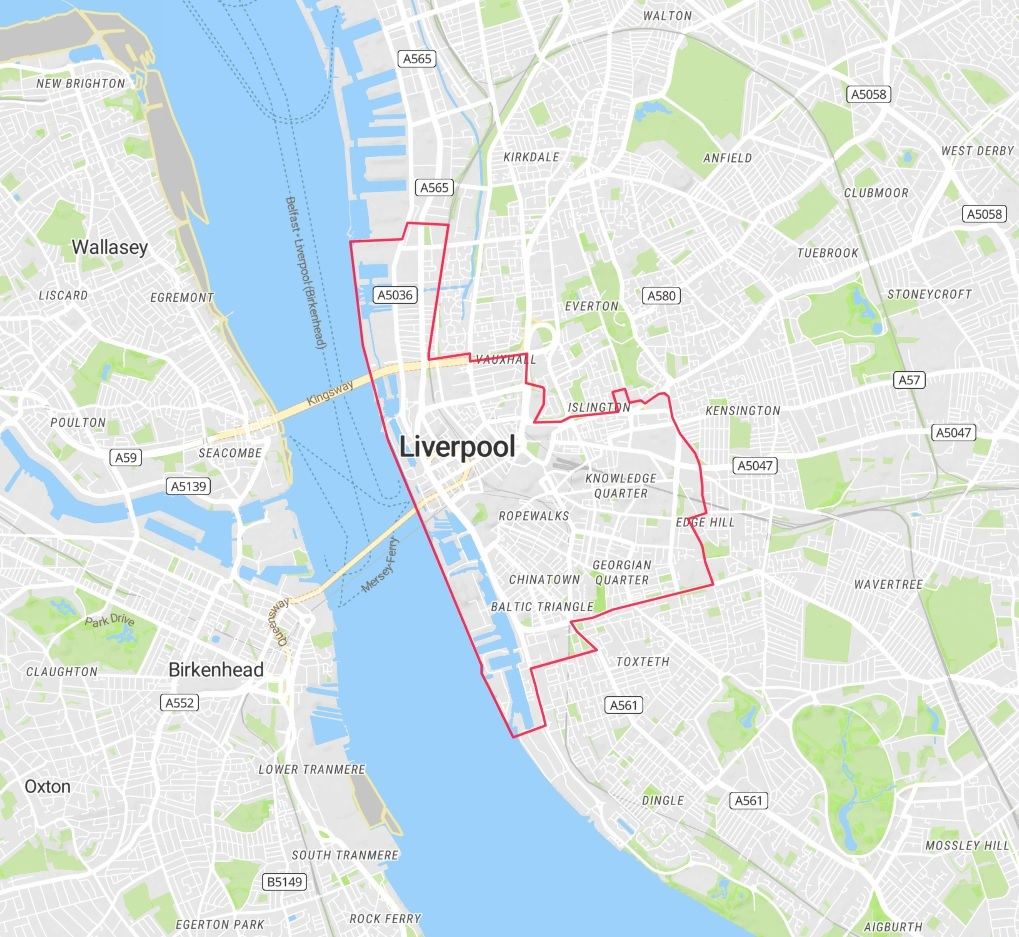
Liverpool city centre (Local Plan map)

Liverpool's most recent local plan is designed to guide the long-term spatial development of the city from 2013 to 2033. It will assist Liverpool City Council in making planning decisions for development proposals and provides detailed advice to city planners on where specific types of development should be built, for example, housing, shops, offices, transport and other infrastructure facilities.

Contained within the local plan is a policies map that delimits the boundaries of Liverpool city centre. Based on this definition, the perimeter of Liverpool city centre is as follows:

Bramley-Moore Dock, Regent Road, Boundary Street, Luton Street, Northern Line rail track, Chadwick Street, Chisenhale Street, Vauxhall Road, Ford Street, Scotland Road, Byrom Way, Hunter Street, Islington, Salisbury Street, Langsdale Street, Shaw Street, College Street South, Brunswick Road, Low Hill, Hall Lane, Mount Vernon Green, Irvine Street, Mason Street, Grinfield Street, Crown Street, Upper Parliament Street, St James Place, Stanhope Street, Gore Street, Hill Street, Sefton Street, Brunswick Way, Waterfront Perimeter.

=== Local government ===
Another definition of Liverpool city centre can be found in local government.

In time for the 2023 United Kingdom local elections, a redesign of Liverpool's electoral map took place which included changes to the city's ward boundaries, the creation of new ward areas and a reduction in the overall number of elected city councillors.

In July 2023, Liverpool City Council created thirteen neighbourhoods across the city, with a new city centre neighbourhood incorporating 5 electoral wards: Brownlow Hill, Canning, City Centre North, City Centre South and Waterfront South. Combined, they have a total population of 36,770.

Liverpool city centre electoral wards (2023 United Kingdom local elections) These electoral wards were created in 2023 following a Boundary Commission review.
Liverpool City Council electoral ward	City councillors	Population (Census 2021)
Brownlow Hill	2	7,358
Canning	2	9,355
City Centre North	2	8,325
City Centre South	3	8,838
Waterfront South	1	2,894
Totals	10	36,770

== Areas ==
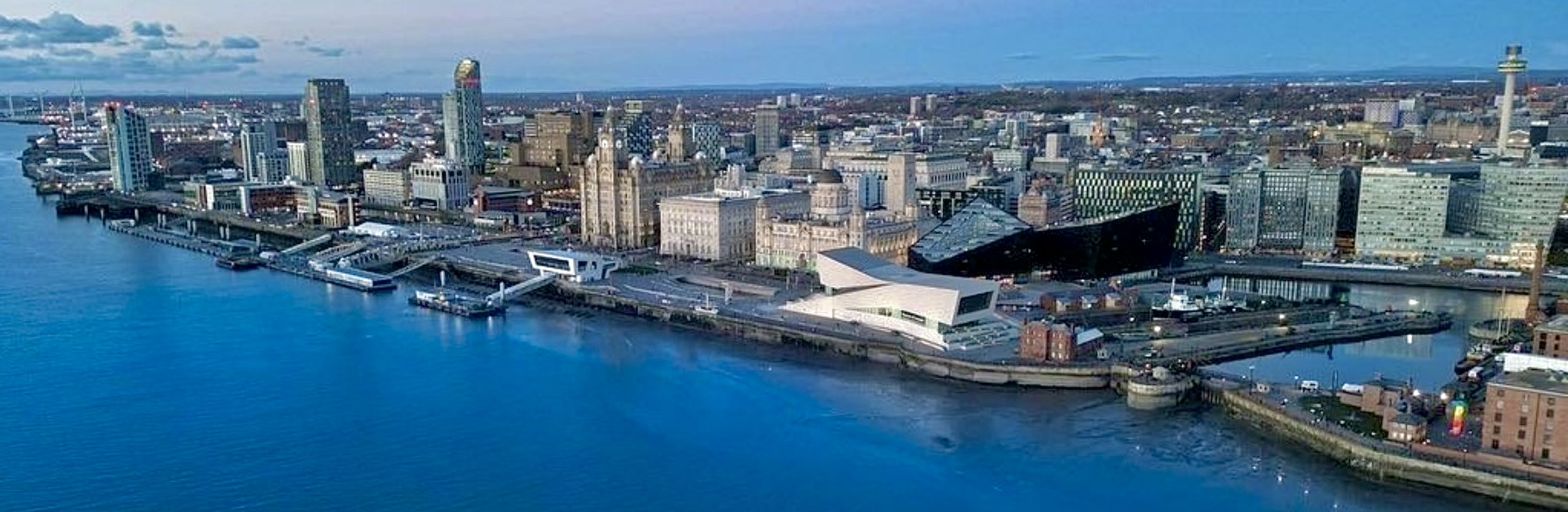
Liverpool city centre skyline as seen from the River Mersey featuring Prince's Dock on the left, Pier Head, Mann Island Buildings and Museum of Liverpool in the centre and part of the Royal Albert Dock in the far right

Distinctive areas that define the centre of Liverpool include the following (the list is not exhaustive):

=== Baltic Triangle ===
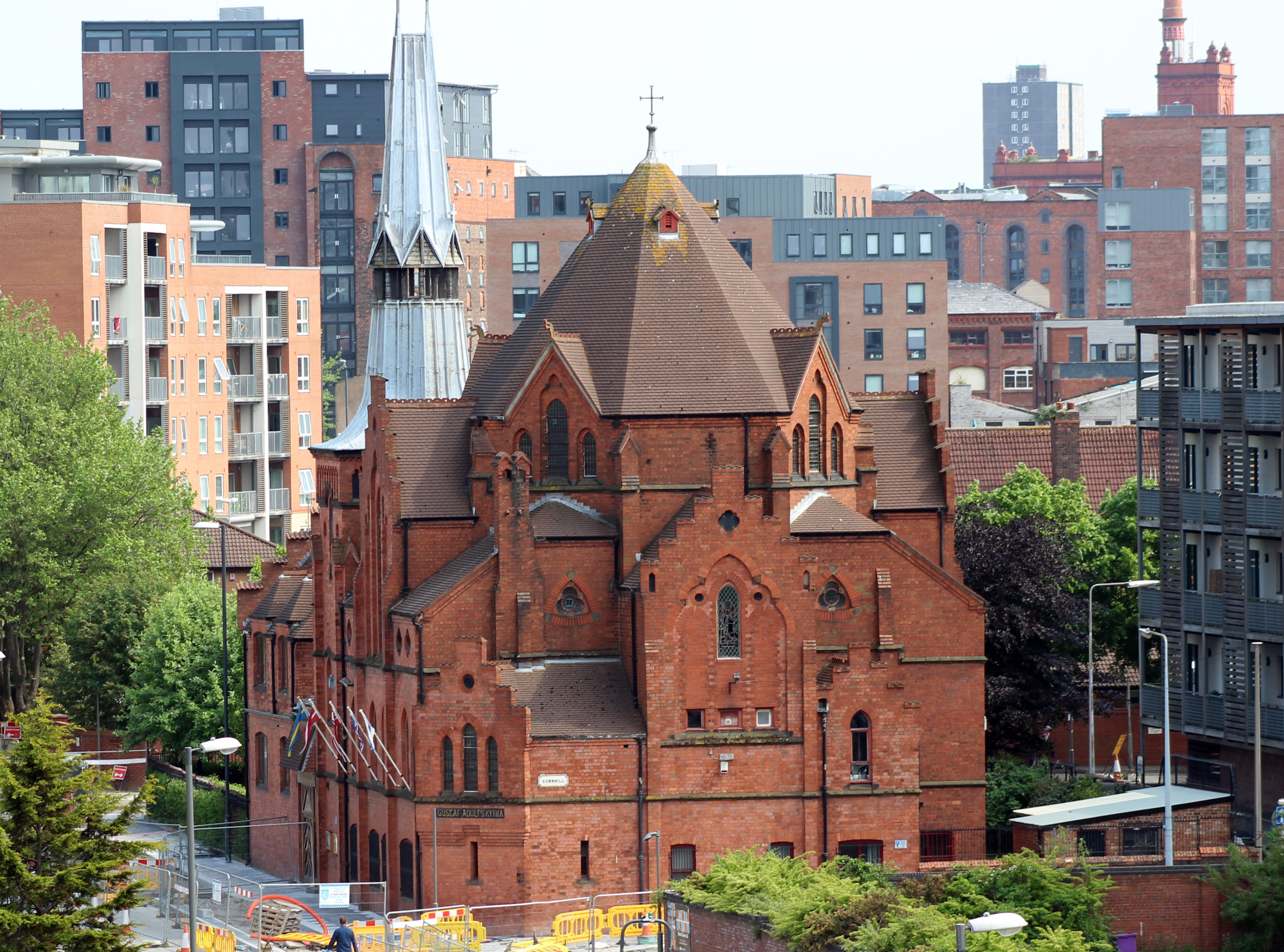
The Gustav Adolf Church (Scandinavian Seamen's Church) in the Baltic Triangle

The Baltic Triangle is defined by Liverpool City Council as the triangular shaped slice of the city bounded by Liver Street, Park Lane, St James Street, Hill Street, Sefton Street and Wapping.

It is believed to have got its name from the number of timber warehouses and yards used for storing timber from the Baltic countries in the 1800s.

Evidence of this period still survives in the Grade II* listed Scandinavian Seamen's Church and the Grade II* Baltic Fleet pub.

The area is home to a range of repurposed warehouses and industrial units which have been converted into offices and studios for a growing number of creative and digital businesses, hotels, a number of live music venues, independent food and drink traders. The area is also known for its street art and the Cains Brewery Village which accommodates coffee shops, markets and bars.

=== Georgian Quarter ===
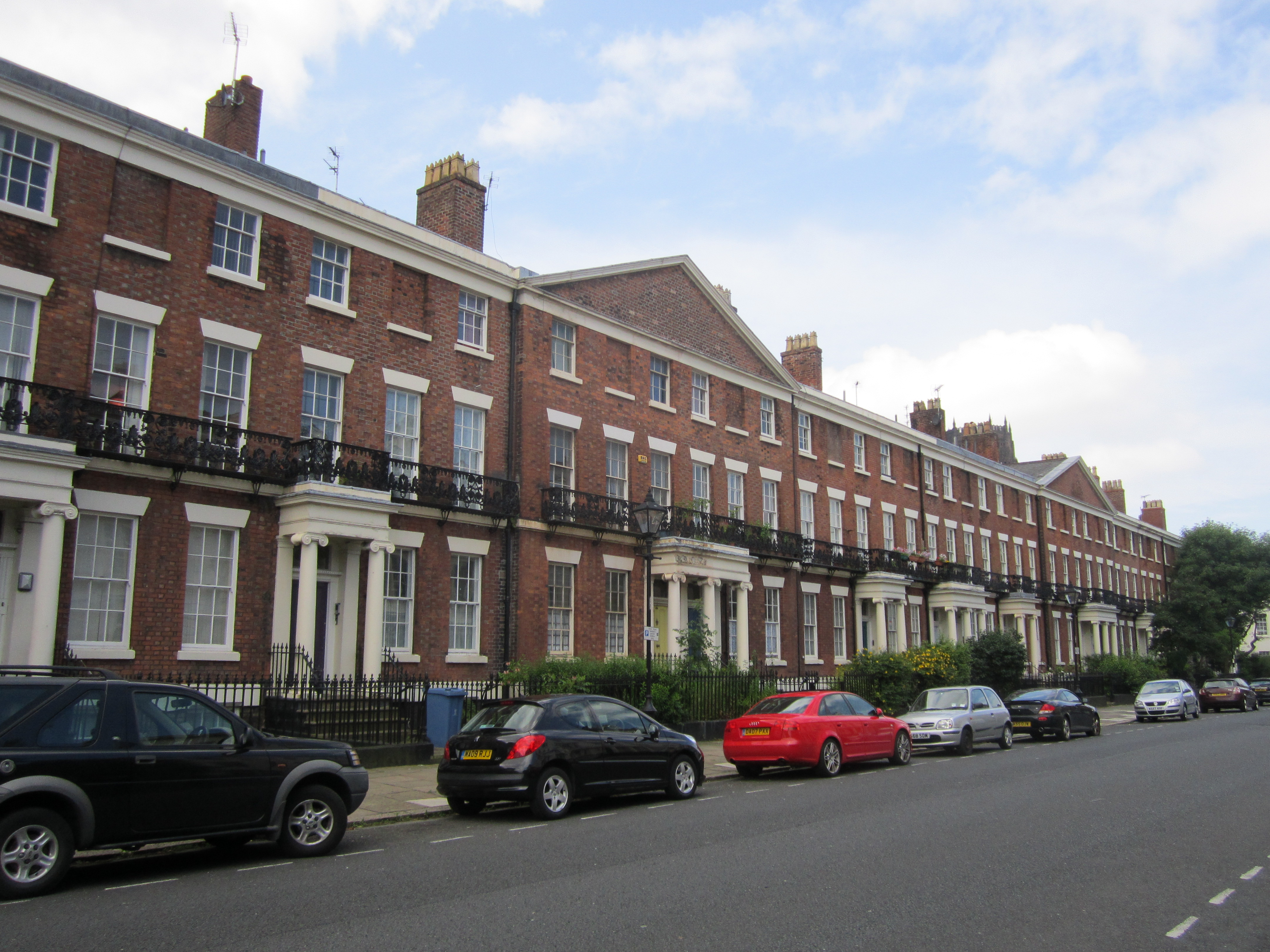
Georgian townhouses on Canning Street, Liverpool

This area is often referred to as the 'Georgian Quarter' due to the heavy prevalence of Georgian era townhouses built for Liverpool's wealthier residents in the 1800s away from the dirt and smoke of the city's industrial areas. The area is characterised by cobbled streets, traditional pubs, restaurants and cultural venues. Liverpool's two cathedrals (Liverpool Anglican Cathedral and the Liverpool Metropolitan Cathedral) can be found at either end of Hope Street. The quarter also incorporates the Royal Liverpool Philharmonic, Liverpool Institute for Performing Arts, Everyman Theatre and Unity Theatre.

=== Cavern Quarter ===
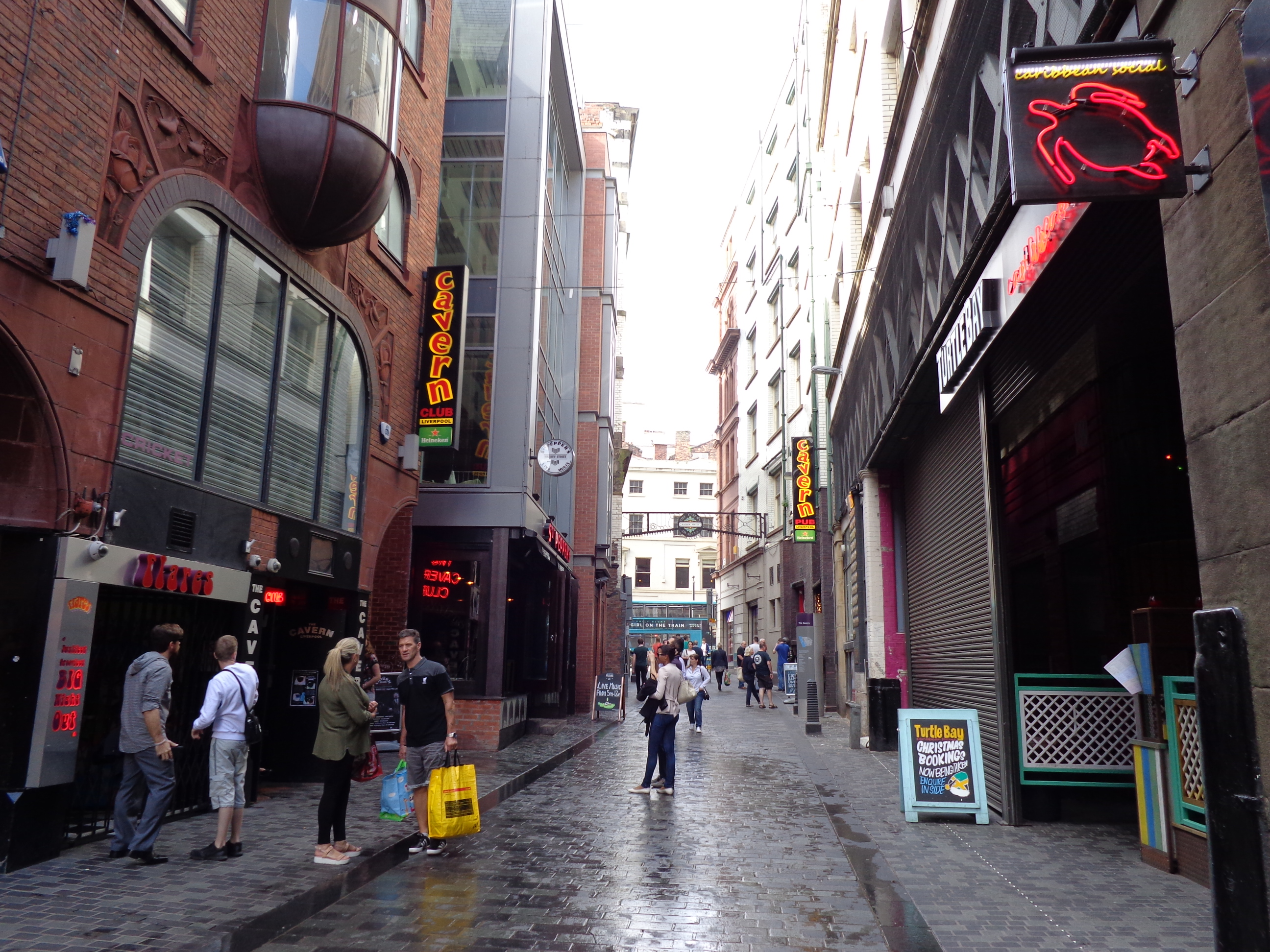
Mathew Street showing The Cavern Club on the left.

The Cavern Quarter is defined as the narrow streets and alleys bounded by Victoria Street, Stanley Street, Whitechapel, Lord Street and North John Street. The area lies within the Liverpool Maritime Mercantile City boundary and contains historic warehouse buildings from the city's major trading history where some of the goods sold in the old St John's Market on Williamson Square were stored.

The Cavern Quarter takes its name from The Cavern Club on Mathew Street, where The Beatles played 292 times in the 1960s. Mathew Street itself is a major tourist attraction, especially for Beatles and Merseybeat related tourism. A number of Beatles themed hotels and museums can be found in and around the street.

Mathew Street also contains the Liverpool Wall of Fame which features 54 gold discs to represent the 54 Liverpool based musicians who have achieved Number 1 in the UK Singles Chart since 1952. Liverpool was awarded UNESCO City of Music status in 2015 and is recognised as the 'World Capital of Pop’ by the Guinness Book of Records.

=== Chinatown ===
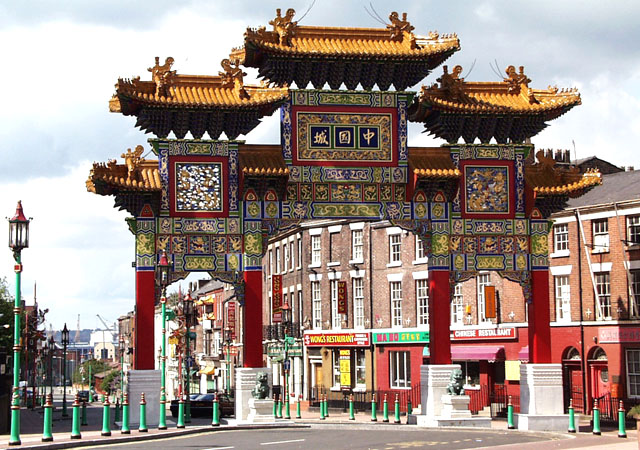
Chinese Arch at Chinatown, Liverpool. The biggest Chinese Arch outside of Asia.

Liverpool is home to the oldest Chinese community in Europe, which has been established in the city since the 1860s due to the historic trade links between the Port of Shanghai and Port of Liverpool.

Chinese sailors and immigrants first settled close to the docks in Cleveland Square, however, following World War One and demolition of the original neighbourhood, a new Chinatown began to emerge slowly inland. Some time in the 1940s, the community began to settle en masse in to tenements on Kent Street, Pitt Street and Upper Frederick Street. This was helped in part by Liverpool's position as a reserve pool for Chinese Merchant sailors in the British Merchant Navy.

By the 1970s, Nelson Street became the centre of Chinatown and the community and businesses extended into nearby Berry Street, Duke Street, Upper Pitt Street and Great George Square.

Chinatown today includes many Chinese restaurants, supermarkets, wholesalers, travel agencies, legal and accountancy firms. Some of the services include the Liverpool Chinese Business Association, Che Gong Tong Chinese Association (UK), See Yep Chinese Association, Wah Sing Chinese Community Centre, Liverpool Chinese Gospel Church, Hoy Yin Chinese Association and The Pagoda Youth Orchestra, which is the largest Chinese youth orchestra in Europe. The Nook House, a pub at the heart of Chinatown, had a long history associated with the Chinese community.

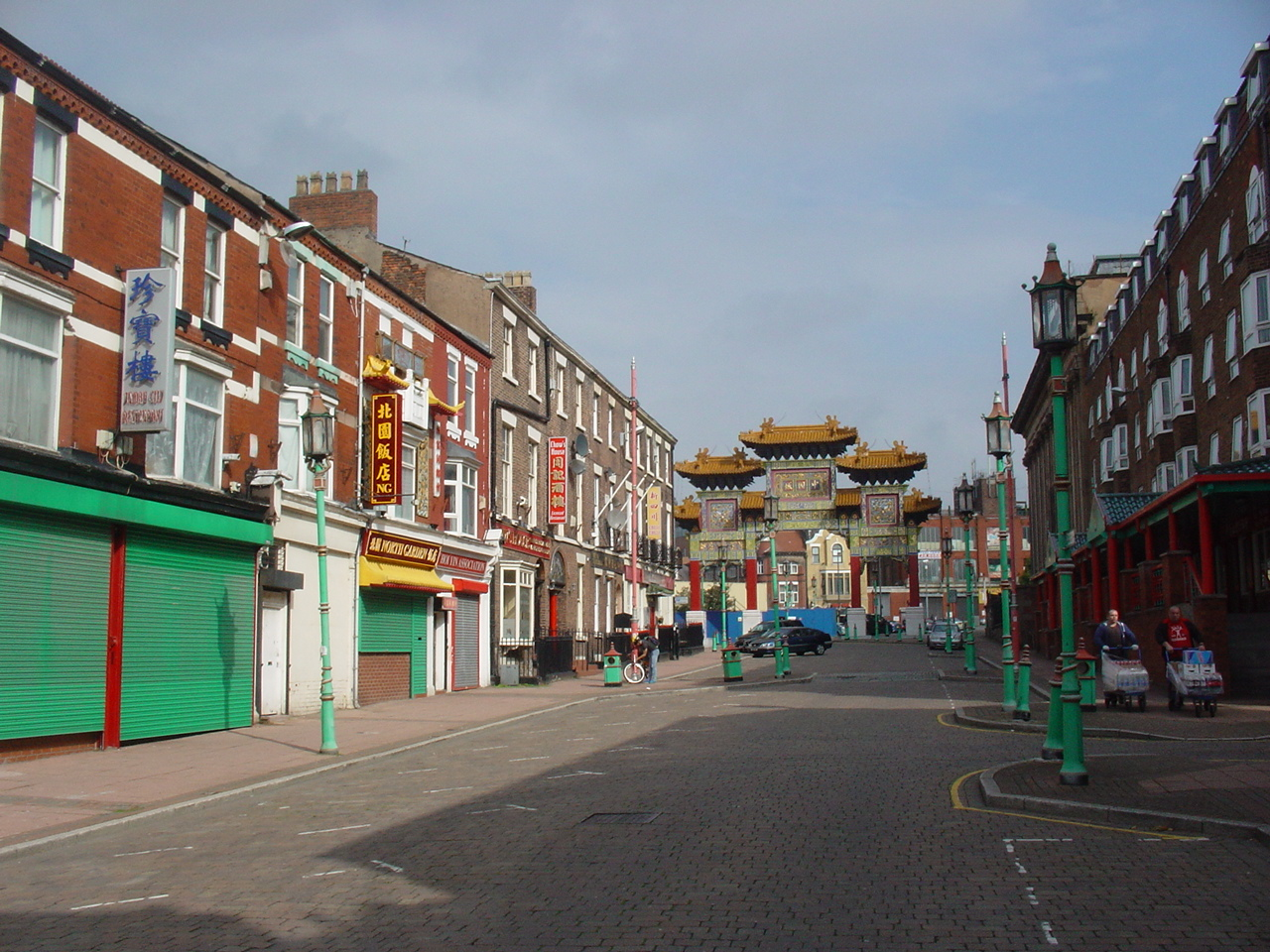
Nelson Street looking up to the Chinese Arch

Liverpool's Chinatown arch is the largest arch of its kind outside of China at 15 m (49 ft) tall and was a gift from Liverpool's twin city Shanghai. It features 200 dragons and five roofs.

Liverpool's four universities also attract a growing number of Chinese students. With almost one in five of its students of Chinese origin, Liverpool University is ranked amongst the top three UK universities with more than a quarter of their fee income coming directly from Chinese students. It has one of the highest number of Chinese students in the UK.

In recent years, due to this growing population of Chinese students and their desire to socialise closer to the university campus, many Chinese businesses have spread out across the city centre in places such as Myrtle Parade near the University of Liverpool and further along Berry Street towards Renshaw Street. This has contributed to a reduction in focus on the traditional Chinatown by younger Chinese people.

=== Commercial district ===
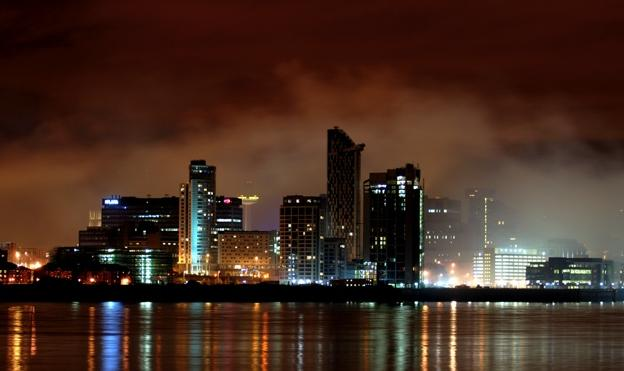
The commercial district at night

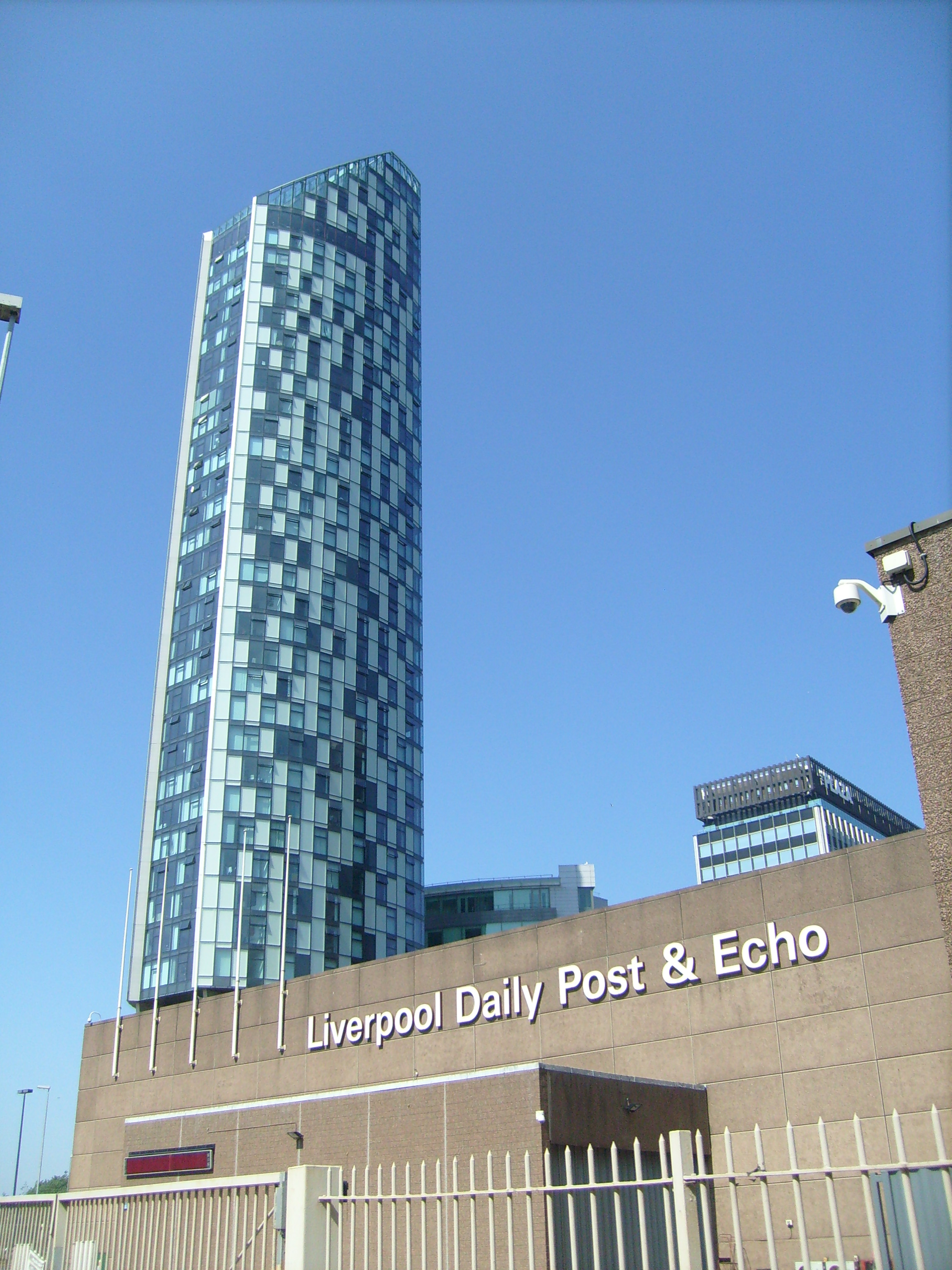
West Tower

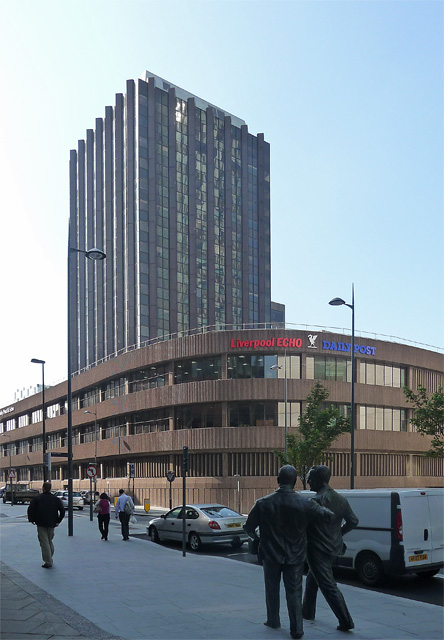
Post & Echo Building

Liverpool's commercial district is centred around Old Hall Street. Some notable employers within the commercial district include the offices of HM Passport Office, BT and Maersk Line.

=== Cultural Quarter ===
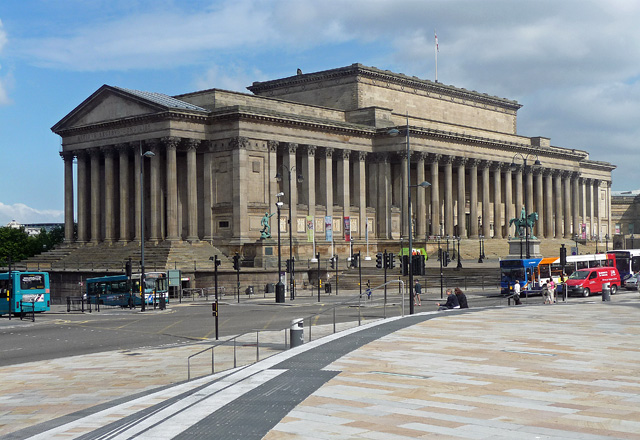
St George's Hall, Liverpool

The Cultural Quarter marks a gateway into Liverpool city centre and encompasses Lime Street Station, St.George's Hall, St George's Plateau, St John's Gardens and the Liverpool Empire Theatre. William Brown Street features the World Museum, Liverpool Central Library and Walker Art Gallery.

Until the late 18th century, the area was on the periphery of the city. However, from the mid 19th century until around 1900, Liverpool's wealthy merchants and entrepreneurs helped to build the series of museums, art galleries, libraries, hotels, gardens and monuments (see also Monument to the King's Liverpool Regiment and Wellington's Column).

The buildings were designed to become major public educational, civic and cultural institutions of monumental proportions to reflect Liverpool's status as the second city of the British Empire. The group was later complemented by the Art Deco Queensway tunnel entrance in 1934.

Most of the buildings in and around William Brown Street are built in the stone faced classical style. The pavements are made of Yorkstone; and the street furniture, although varied, is often of historic interest to complement the buildings.

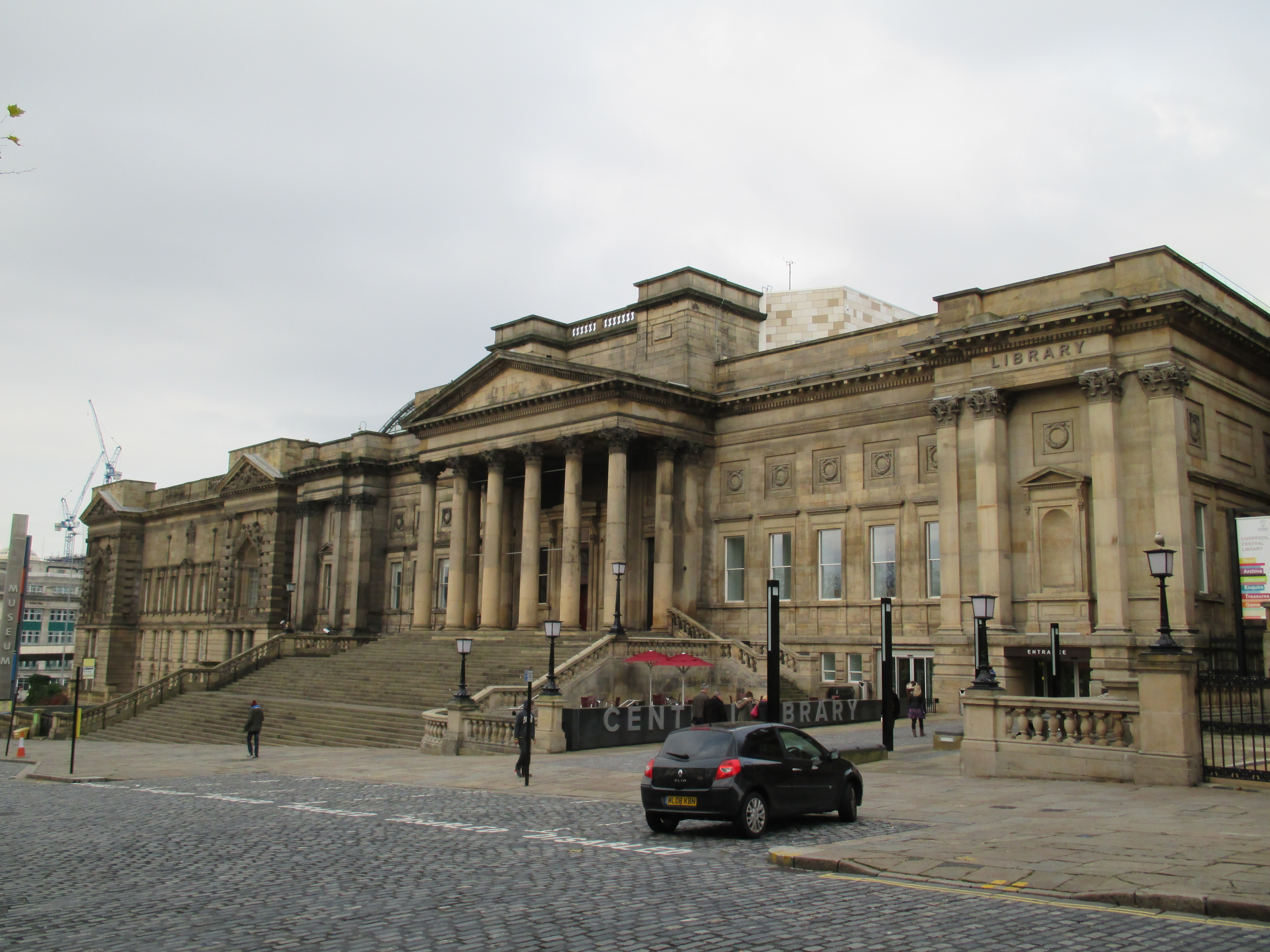
World Museum on William Brown Street

St George's Plateau has been the focus of many of the most significant events in the city's history. In the present day, it is most often used for staging public events or political demonstrations, or as the starting point for important marches in the city. Events have included Christmas markets, political speeches, Remembrance Day events, an assembly point for Liverpool's annual Pride march and a live show to a crowd of 30,000 people to mark Liverpool's hosting of the Eurovision Song Contest 2023.

=== Islington ===
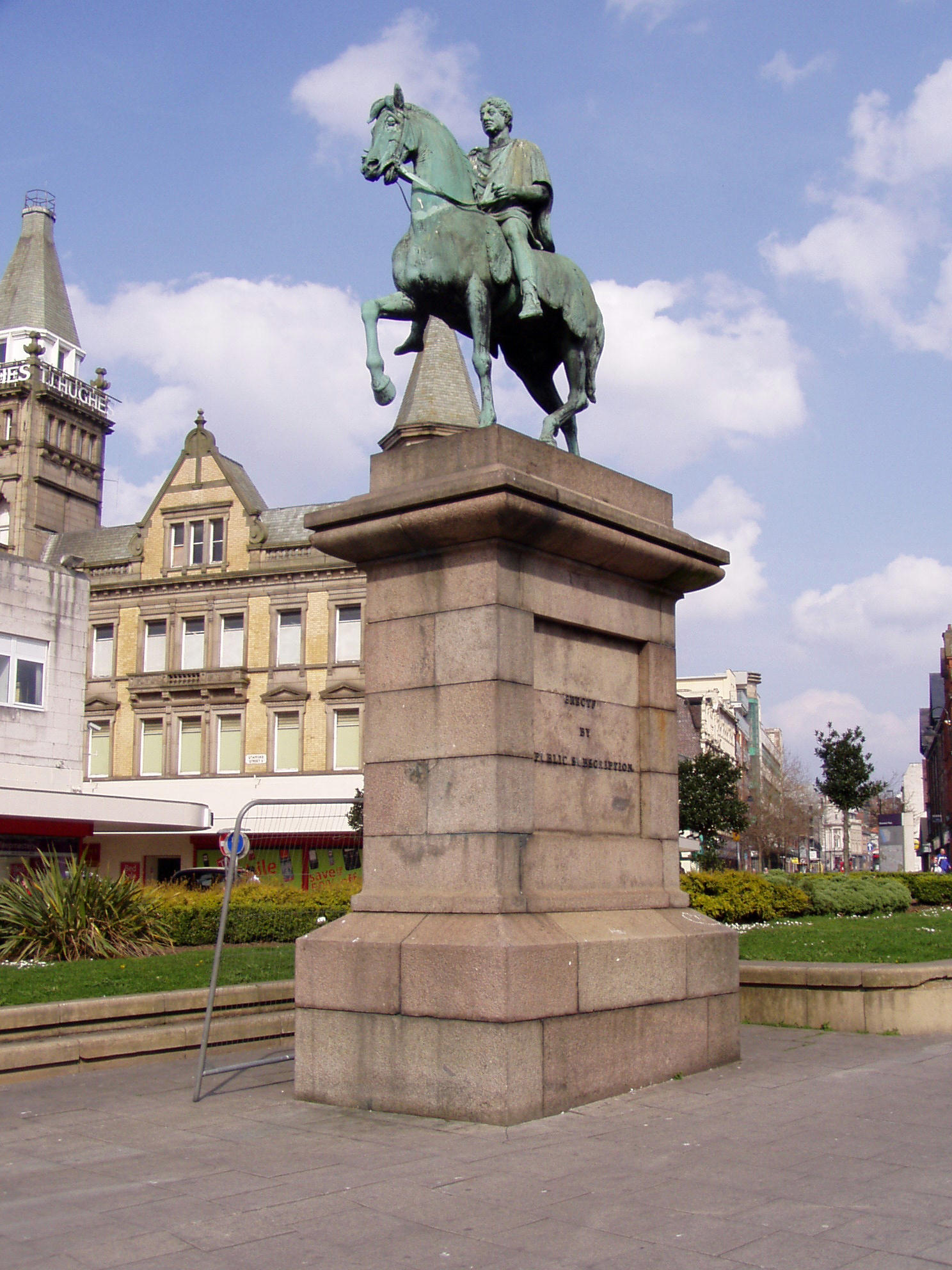
King George III statue at Monument Place

Islington is a neighbourhood on the eastern approach to Liverpool city centre based on a major road called Islington and the streets in and around London Road. The area is characterised primarily by low-density warehousing, wholesalers, supermarkets specialising in food from around the world and discount retail units. There is also a growing residential population of students and key workers, particularly doctors and nurses associated with the city's Royal Liverpool University Hospital.

The area has a longstanding history with businesses associated with the fabric and textiles industry and been labelled as 'The Fabric District'.

In recent history, the area has been criticised for falling into decline and neglect. The long term plan aims to regenerate the area for mixed uses with a focus on makers, manufacturing, and tech-based businesses. This will be complimented by retail, leisure and residential.

A market operates several days per week on Monument Place.

=== Knowledge Quarter ===
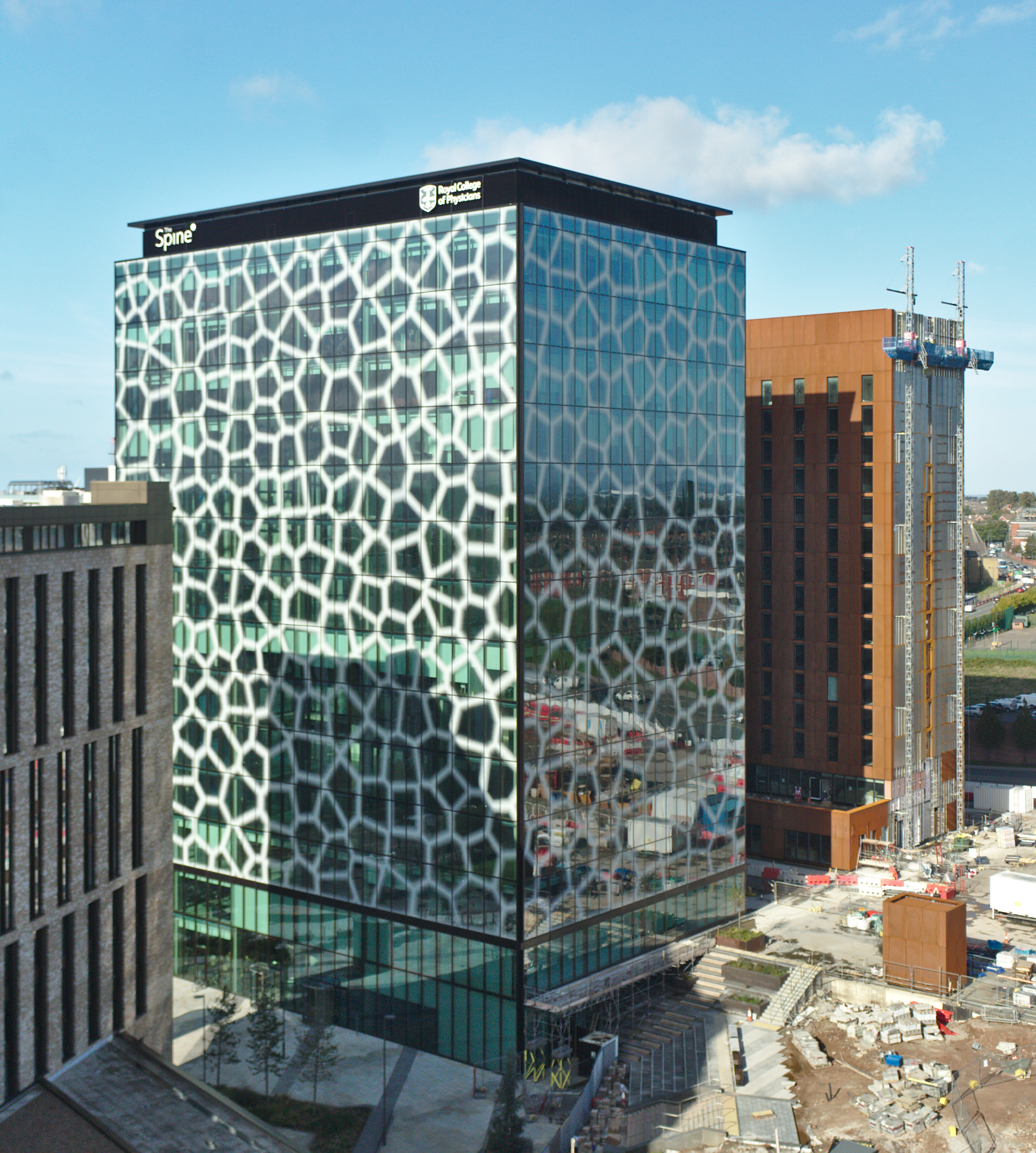
The Spine Building at Paddington Village, home to the Royal College of Physicians

The Knowledge Quarter is a name adopted by Liverpool City Council for a 450 acres (180 ha) district which has been developed as a site for science, health, technology, education, medicine and culture based industries.

The Knowledge Quarter comprises several interconnected areas including the vicinity around London Road, the Fabric District, Islington and Paddington Village.

The following are found within the area:

Royal Liverpool University Hospital, Clatterbridge Cancer Centre NHS Foundation Trust, University of Liverpool's main campus, parts of Liverpool John Moores University at Copperas Hill and Byrom Street, Material Innovation Factory, Digital Innovation Facility, Liverpool Hope Creative Campus, Liverpool School of Tropical Medicine and Liverpool Science Park. Paddington Village features the Liverpool International College and was chosen as the UK's northern headquarters for the Royal College of Physicians.

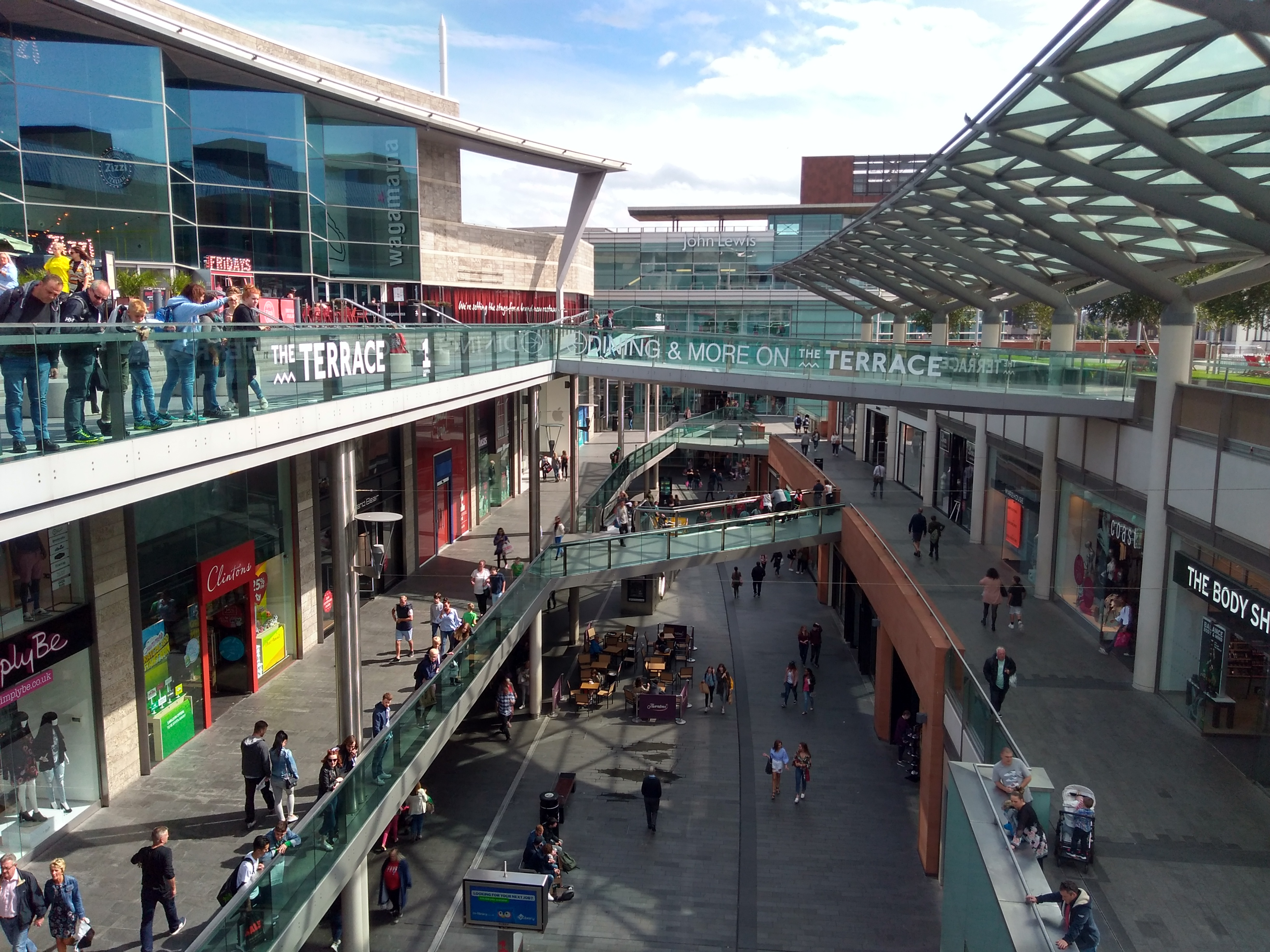
Liverpool One shopping complex

=== Main retail area ===
The retail area encompasses Liverpool One, Church Street, Lord Street, Williamson Square, St Johns Shopping Centre, Metquarter, Clayton Square Shopping Centre and numerous adjoining and connecting streets.

Liverpool One spans across Paradise Street, South John Street, Peter's Lane, Hanover Street and Chavasse Park.

Bold Street is the focus of more independent shops and services. In total, some 9,300 people are employed in retailing in Liverpool City Centre.

=== Pride Quarter ===
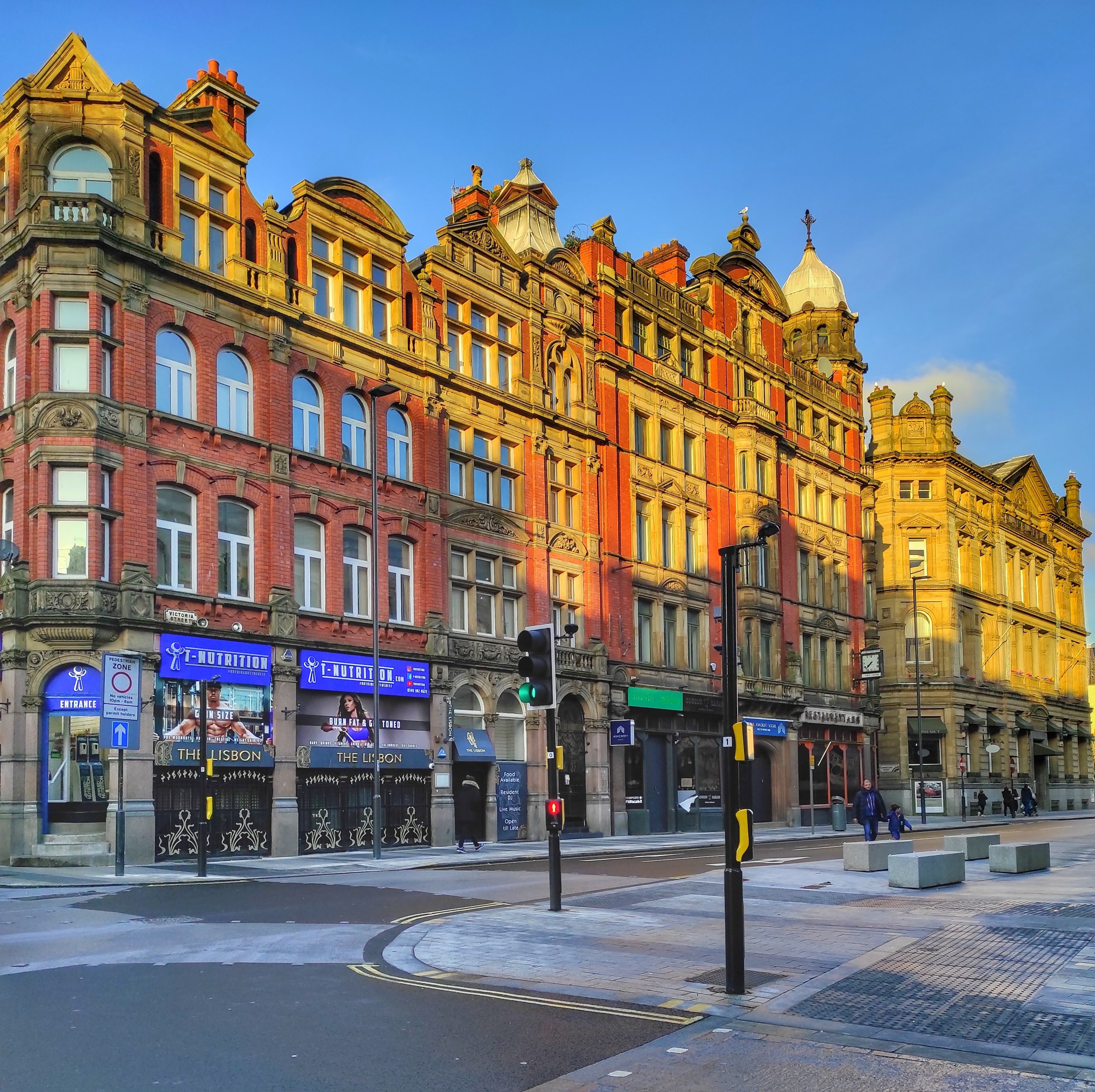
The Lisbon, Liverpool's oldest gay pub

The Lisbon pub on the corner of Stanley Street and Victoria Street has catered for the LGBT community since well before the 1970s. During the 1970s, the area in and around Stanley Street became more relevant as an LGBT neighbourhood with the opening of Paco's Bar, Jody's and The Curzon.

Before this, the established meeting places for the largely underground gay community were in a number of venues surrounding Queen Square, however, due to their demolition to make way for the new St Johns Shopping Centre, the community began to give more focus to Stanley Street. By the 1980s and 1990s, the Stanley Street gay village continued to grow with the opening of more gay bars and clubs.

In 2011, Liverpool became the first city in the UK to officially recognise its gay quarter with rainbow street signs. New street signs featuring a rainbow arch were unveiled on Stanley Street, Cumberland Street, Temple Lane, Eberle Street and Temple Street to acknowledge the significance and history of the area for the city's LGBT community.

In 2012, the gay district was rebranded as the Pride Quarter with support from the LCR Pride Foundation and Marketing Liverpool. Thirteen LGBT venues located in the quarter celebrated its establishment with an indoor festival.

Liverpool's Pride Quarter attracts thousands of people every week from many parts of the UK and beyond who come to experience the nightlife.

=== Pumpfields ===
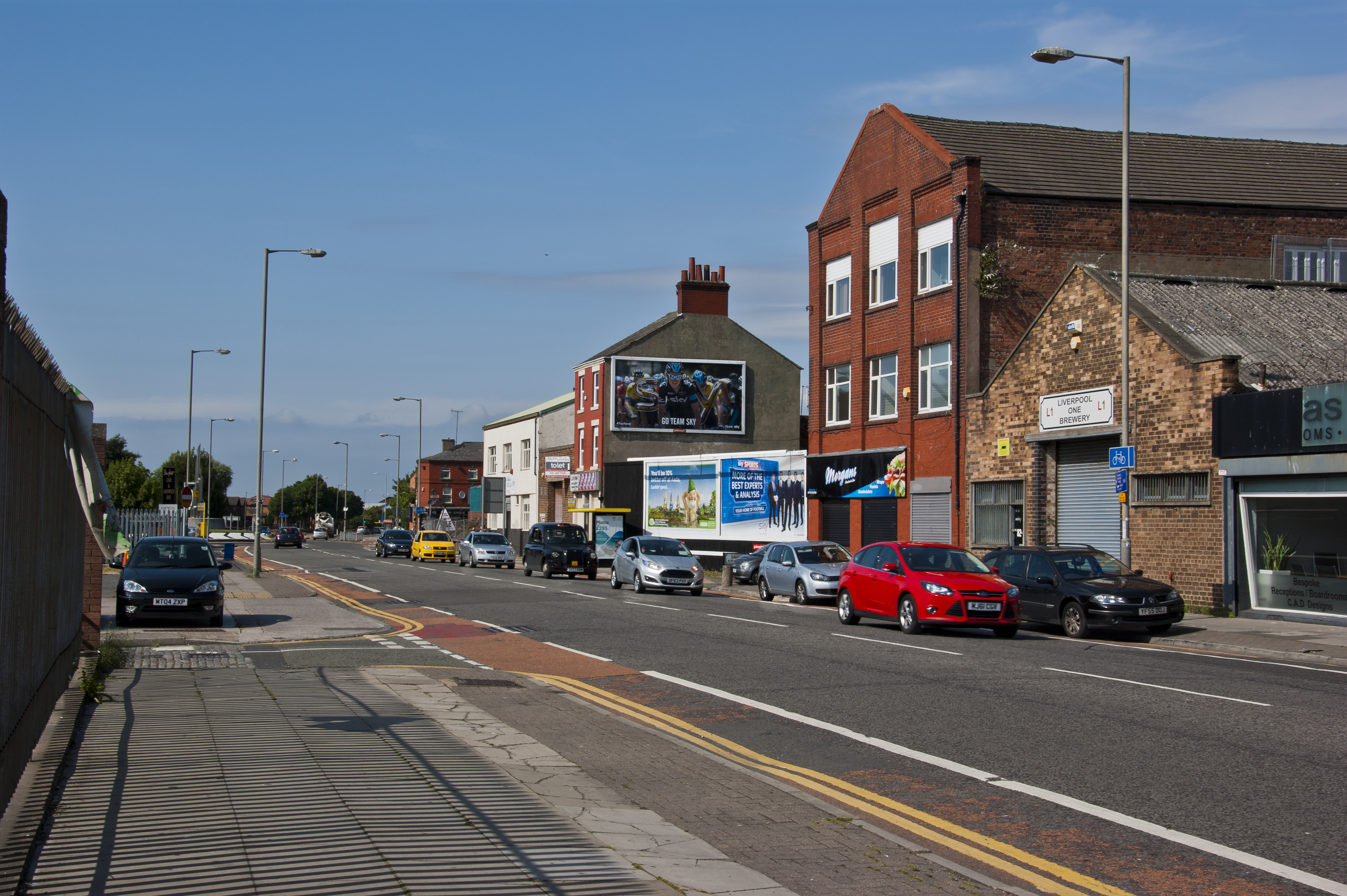
Vauxhall Road close to its junction with Leeds Street

Pumpfields covers 75 acres at the northern edge of Liverpool city centre stretching northwards from Leeds Street to Chisendale Street and eastwards from Vauxhall Road to Scotland Road. Historically, the area was dominated by industry but fell in to decline in the 20th century. A large electric power station known as the Pumpfields Power Station once stood close to Vauxhall Road for much of the 20th century.

In 2026, Liverpool City Council published a supplementary planning document with proposals to create a mixed-use residential neighbourhood in the area.

=== Ropewalks ===
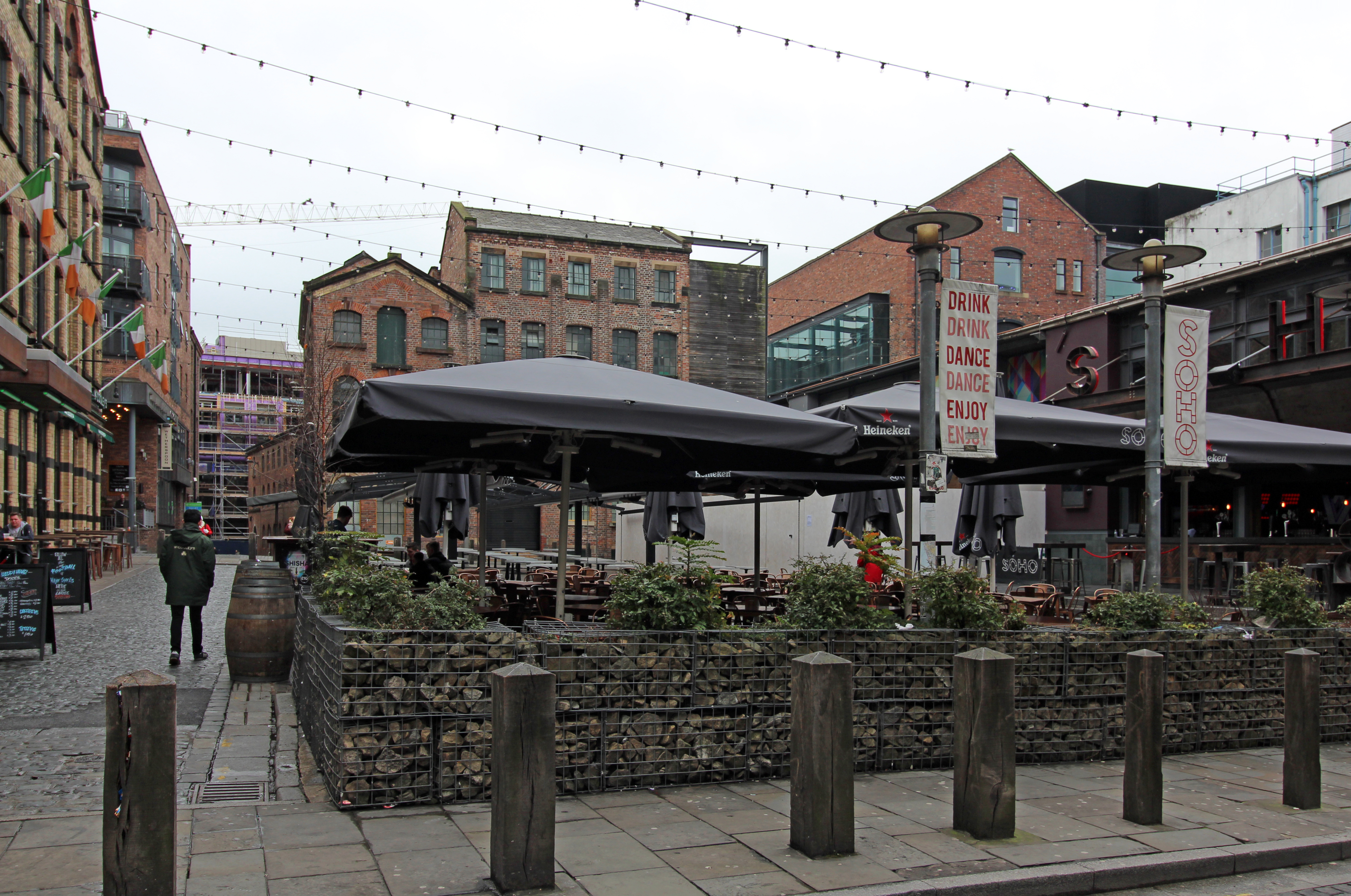
Concert Square, one of Liverpool's main nightlife areas in RopeWalks

Ropewalks is the area bounded by Hanover Street, Back Bold Street, Leece Street, Roscoe Street, Upper Duke Street, Great George Street, Great George Square, Upper Pitt Street, Kent Street, Lydia Ann Street and Hanover Street.

Due to Liverpool's growth as a major international seaport in the 18th Century, which included the world's first commercial enclosed dock, merchants of the town expanded their trade in a wide variety of commodities. Such a boom in trade led to merchants needing premises for homes, warehouses and associated uses. Due to its topography and proximity to the docks and Custom House, Ropewalks was a practical place to lay out streets that would accommodate grand merchant's residences, cultural institutions and shops. Interconnecting and narrower streets would contain the industries, warehousing and poorer housing.

Due to the long, straight, parallel design of some of the streets, they became useful for laying down and making ropes to assist in shipbuilding. These particular streets are known as ropewalks, hence the area has since been styled as such.

In the 20th Century and present day, Ropewalks has evolved in to a cultural hub for independent shops, international restaurants, world food stores, bazaars, galleries and as a centre for nightlife.

Cultural venues in the area include FACT Liverpool, Bluecoat Chambers, Epstein Theatre, and the Church of St Luke (also known as the 'Bombed Out Church') at the top of Bold Street. Concert Square and surrounding Seel Street, Fleet Street and Slater Street form one of the most popular areas for Liverpool's nightlife.

=== Waterfront ===
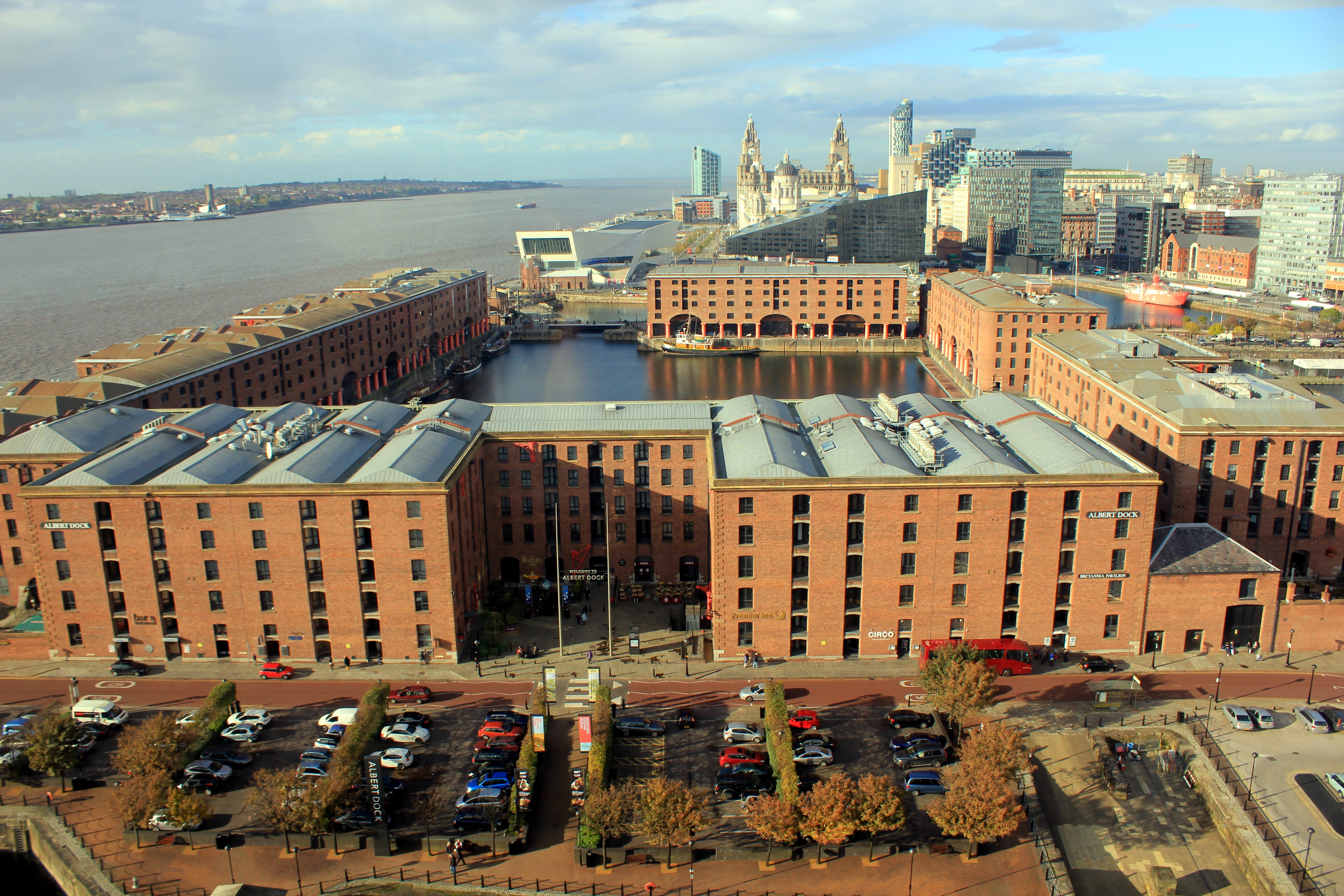
Liverpool Waterfront showing the Royal Albert Dock in the forefront and Pier Head in the distance

Liverpool's Waterfront lies adjacent to the River Mersey. The city centre section stretches 3 miles (4.8 km) from Bramley-Moore Dock in the north to Brunswick Dock in the south.

Liverpool has the largest and most complete system of historic docks in the world and many buildings date back to when Liverpool was one of the world's most important ports at the centre of international trade. In the 20th and 21st centuries, much of the docklands has been remodelled to incorporate a large amount of cultural establishments of national and international significance including British Music Experience, The Beatles Story, International Slavery Museum, Museum of Liverpool and Tate Liverpool.

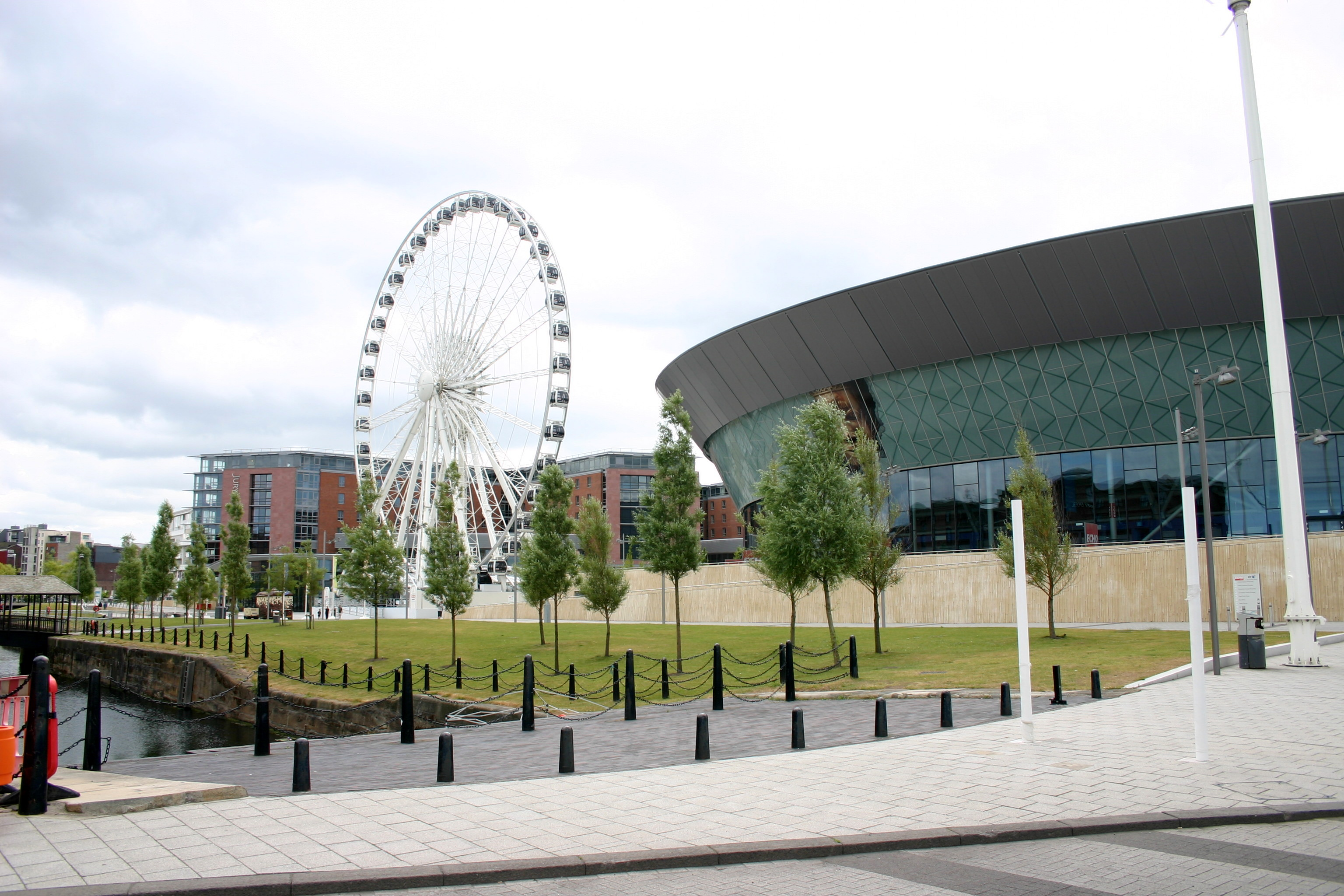
ACC Liverpool with the Wheel of Liverpool

King's Dock is home to the ACC Liverpool Arena, Convention Centre and Exhibition Centre Liverpool complex. Surrounding them is the Wheel of Liverpool as well as hotels, restaurants, bars and apartments. The future plan for King's Dock is to develop more leisure, hotel, residential and offices.

Liverpool Marina comprises 270 berths on floating timber pontoons across two docks. It accommodates yachts, powerboats, canal boats, narrow boats, barges, ribs, especially those who cruise the Irish Sea to explore the Liverpool area, North Wales coast, Isle of Man, Ireland, Cumbria and Scotland. The Liverpool Yacht Club holds a series of races throughout the year.

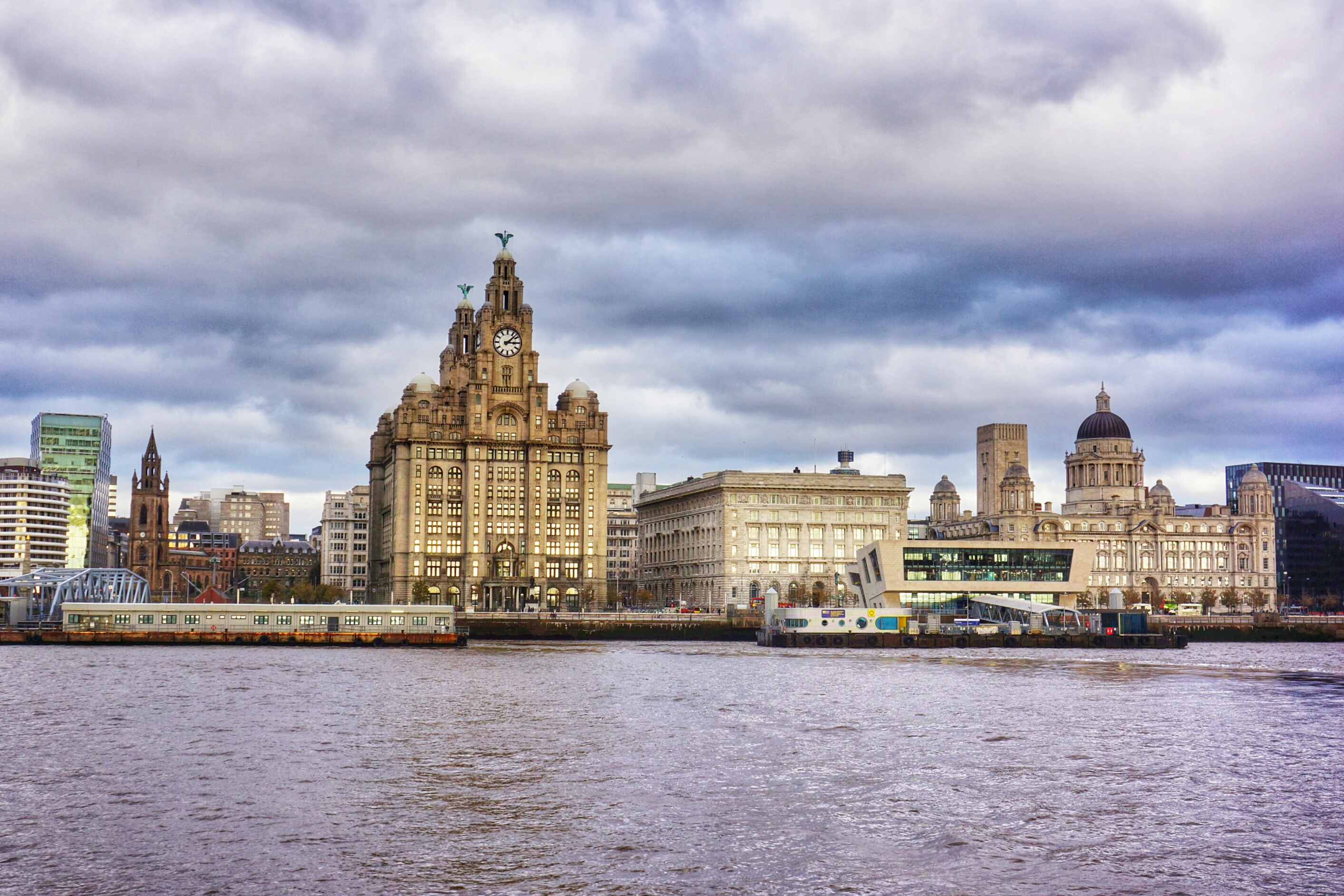
Liverpool Waterfront showing the 'Three Graces'

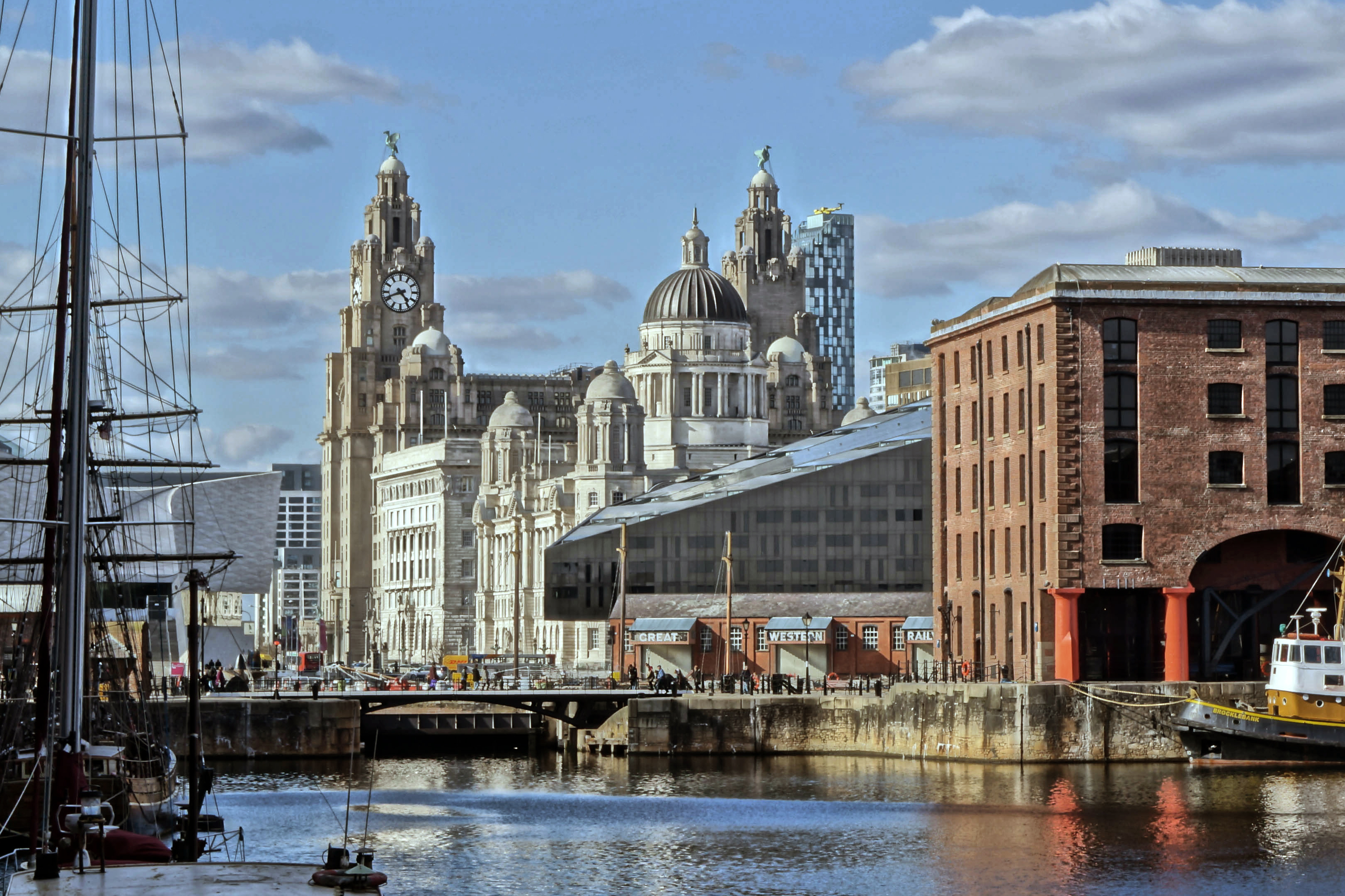
The buildings of Pier Head from the Albert Dock

Liverpool Waters is a 60-hectare (150-acre) section of the Liverpool Waterfront which encompasses Princes Dock, Central Docks, Clarence Docks, the Northern Docks and King Edward Triangle.

Prince's Dock, immediately to the north of the Pier Head and Three Graces, is the home of the Liverpool Cruise Terminal where turnaround cruises arrive and depart, and the Isle of Man ferry terminal is to the north.

The Pier Head is home to the 'Three Graces' which have dominated the city's skyline for over a century (they are the Royal Liver Building, the Cunard Building and the Port of Liverpool Building). The Memorial to the Engine Room Heroes of the Titanic is also sited here alongside the British Music Experience, Pier Head Ferry Terminal and Queensway Tunnel Ventilation Shaft. Pier Head is also often used to stage large scale public events. Pier Head is bordered to the north by Prince's Dock and to the south by Mann Island. Mann Island is another section of the Liverpool waterfront which is the location of the Museum of Liverpool, RIBA North and the offices of Liverpool City Region Combined Authority and mayor of the Liverpool City Region.

The Royal Albert Dock is dominated by a large selection of 19th century warehouses. They house the Tate Liverpool, Merseyside Maritime Museum, International Slavery Museum, The Beatles Story, and various shops, bars, restaurants and cafes.

== Demography ==
Ethnic breakdown in Liverpool city centre – (UK Census 2021)
Ethnic group	Liverpool city centre	England
Population	36,770	56.5 million
White	72.2%	81.0%
Asian	13.59%	9.6%
Other	5.61%	2.2%
Mixed/Multiple	4.99%	3.0%
Black	3.61%	4.2%

Since the early 1990s, agencies within Liverpool (including the City Council) have been actively promoting city centre living. The city centre population has consistently grown from around 10,000 residents in 1991; 13,500 in 2001; 15,271 in 2006; 29,060 in 2016 to almost 40,000 residents in 2023.

== Architecture ==
RIBA North and their public gallery are situated on Mann Island.

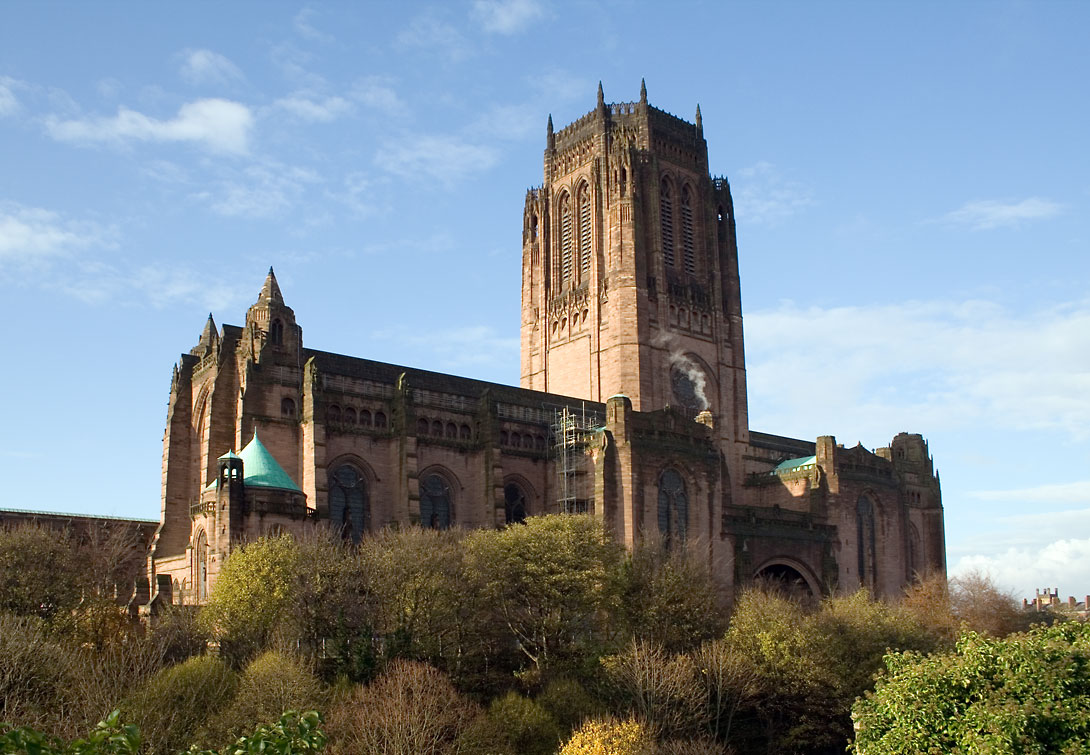
Liverpool Cathedral

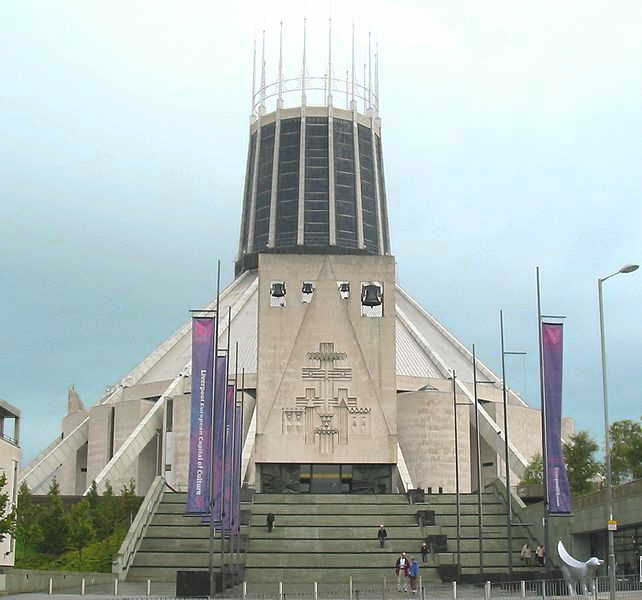
Liverpool Metropolitan Cathedral

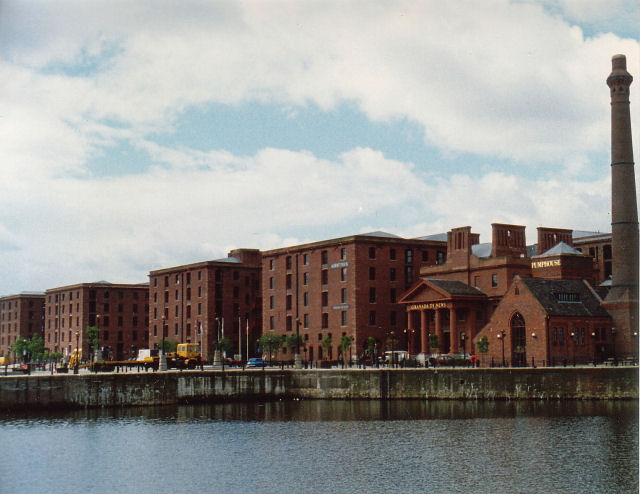
Albert Dock

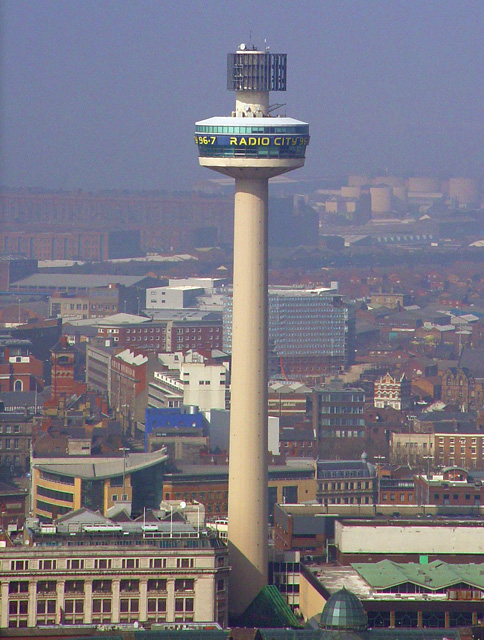
Radio City Tower

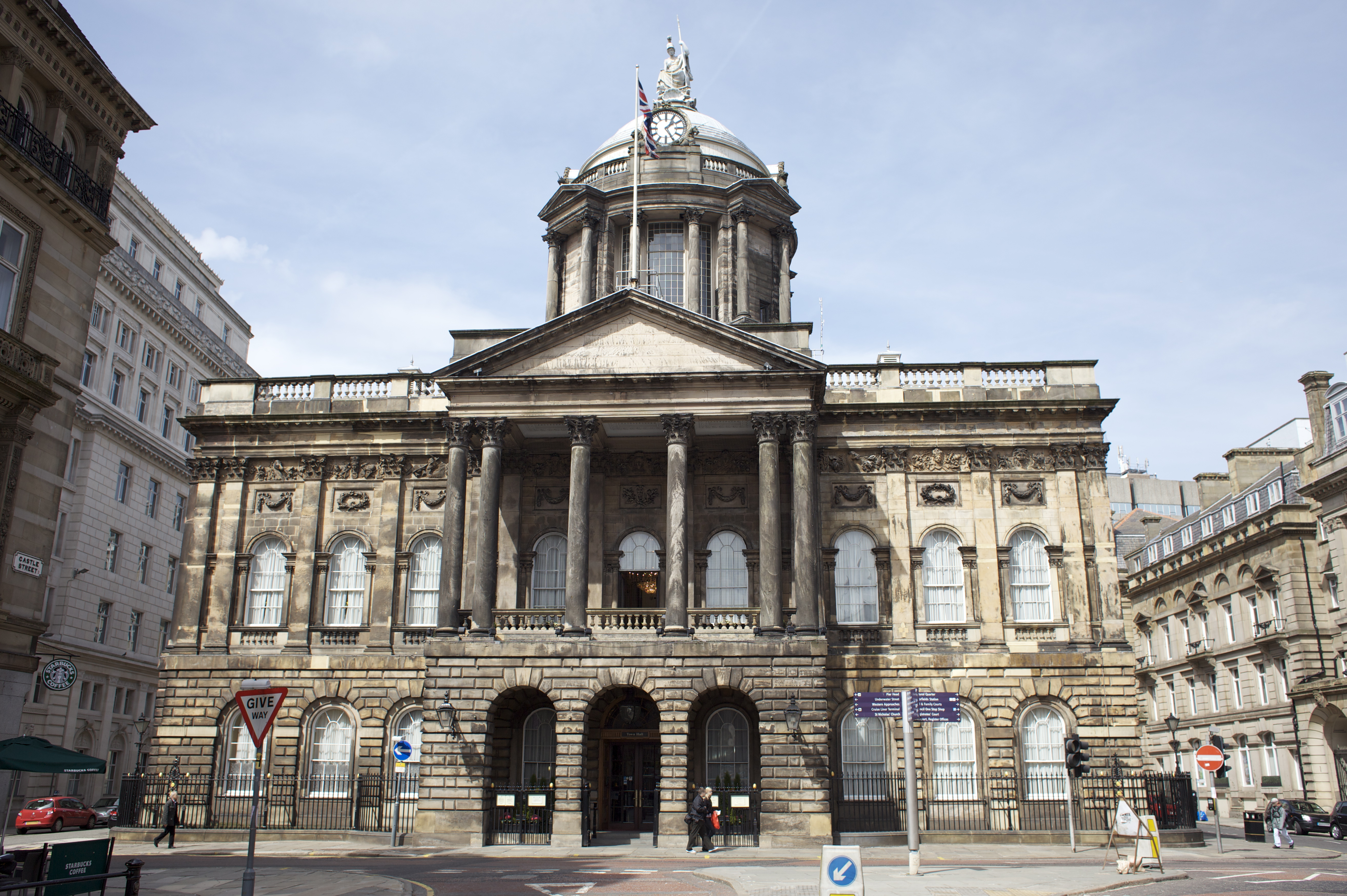
Liverpool Town Hall

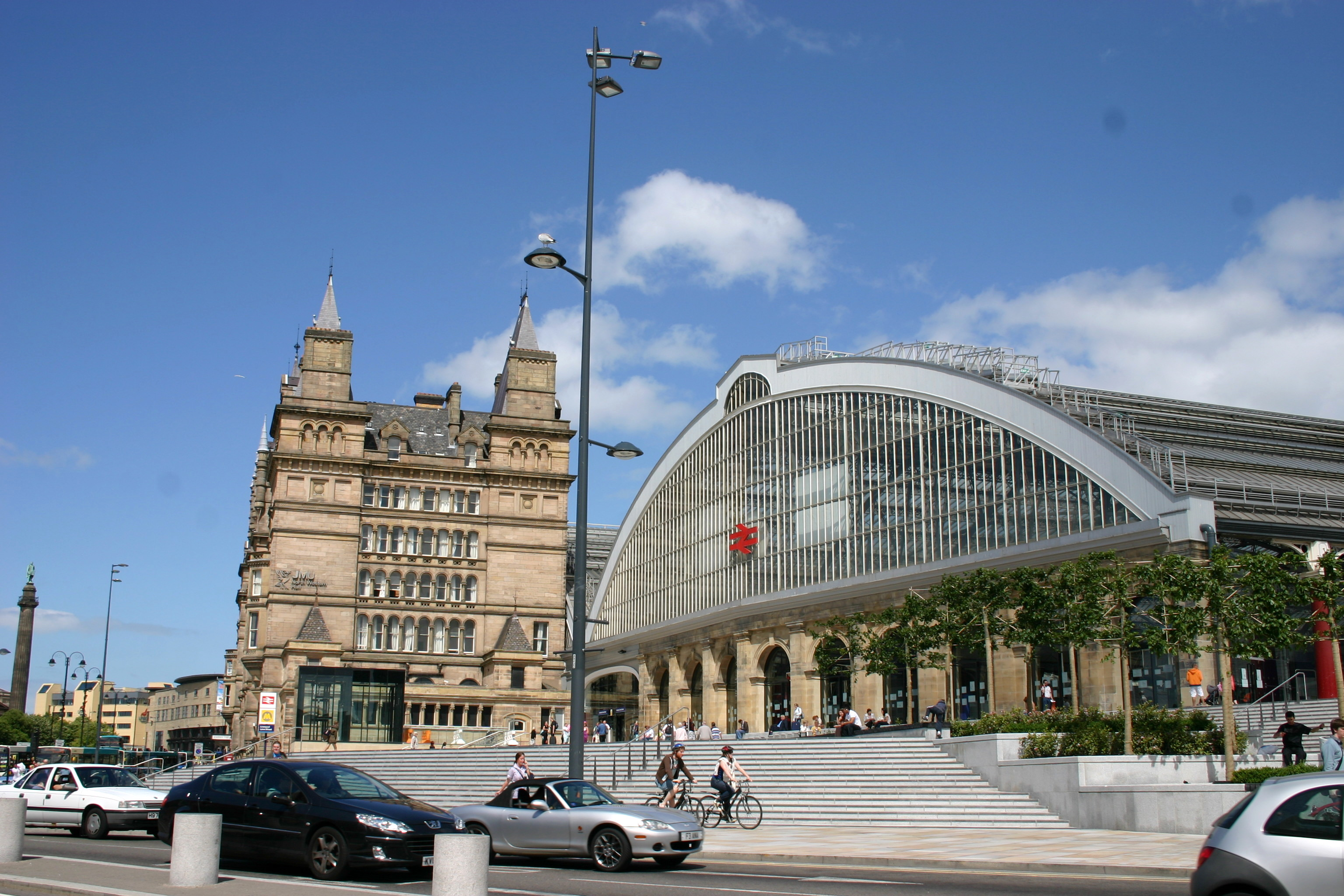
Liverpool Lime Street railway station

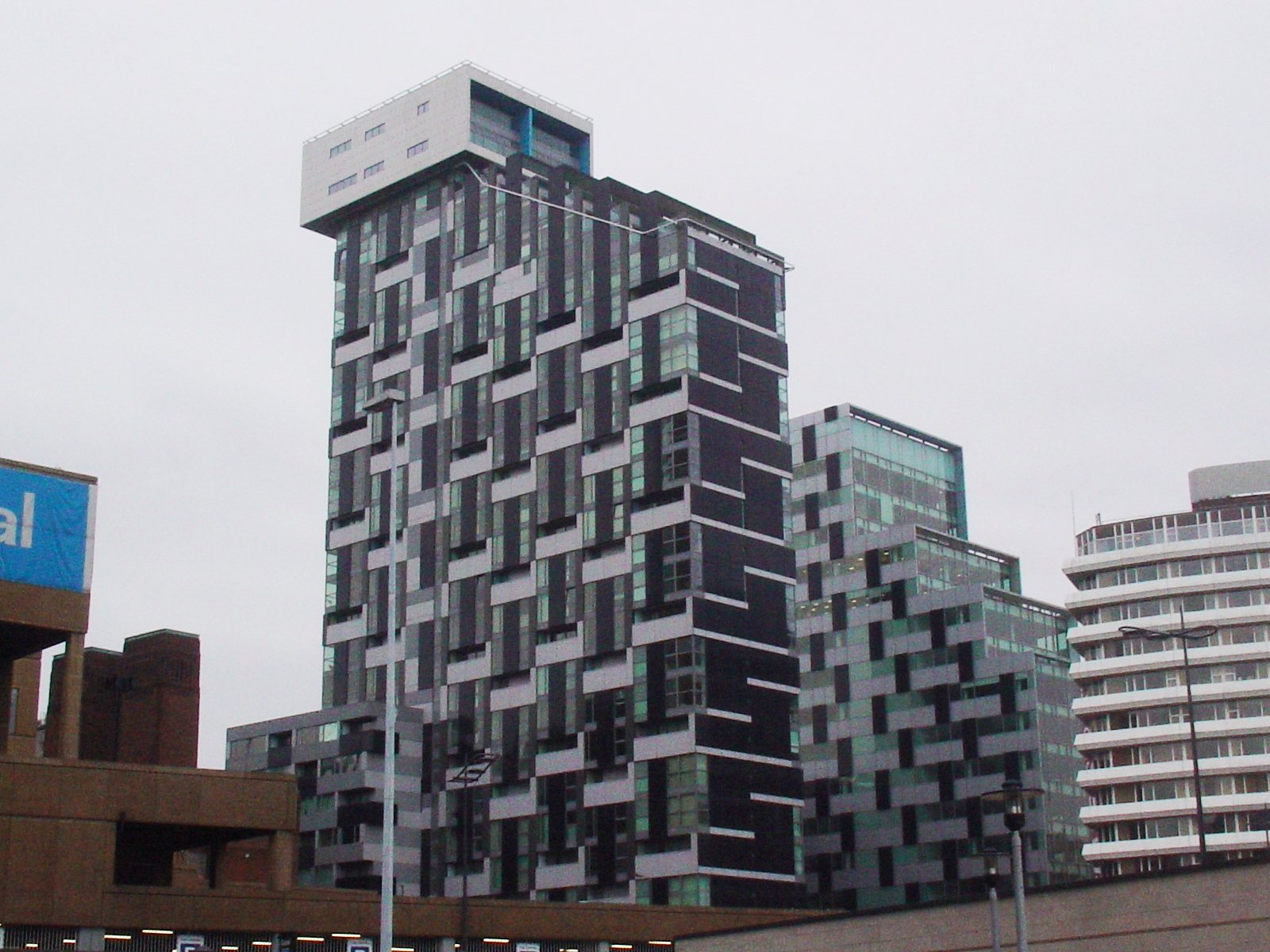
Unity Buildings

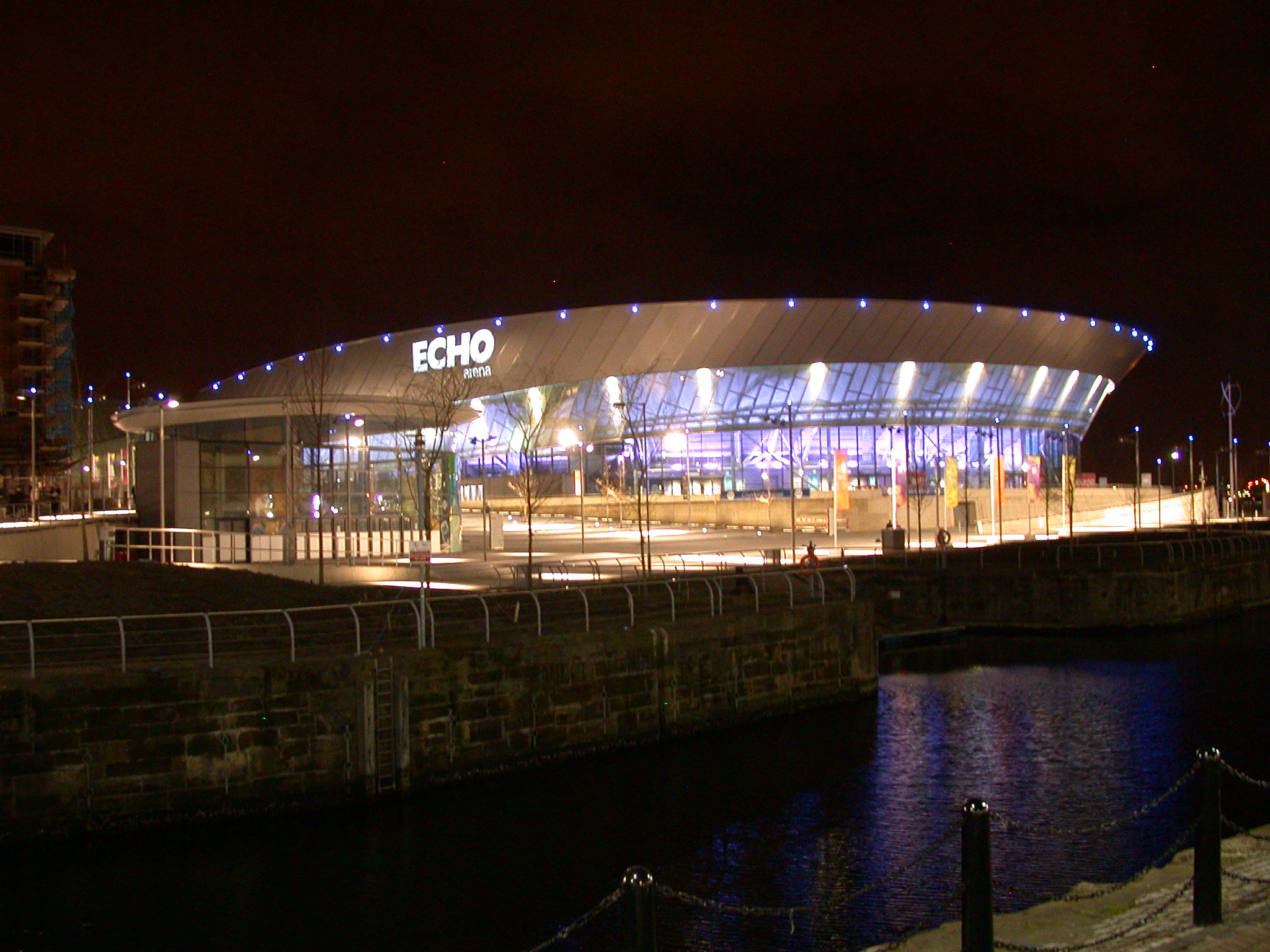
Liverpool Arena

== Culture and tourism ==
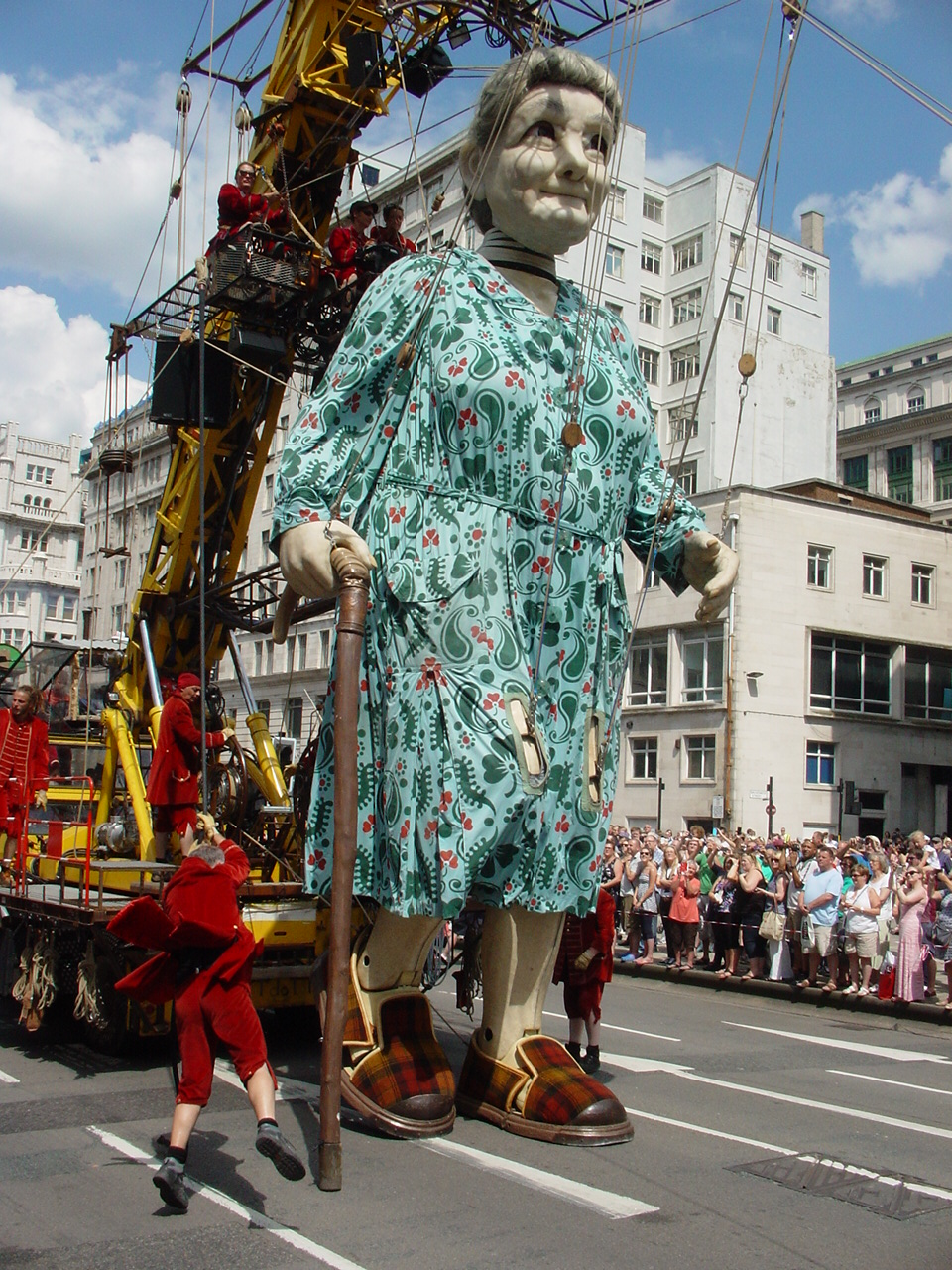
Grandmother giant at the Royal de Luxe Memories of August 1914

In 2023, Liverpool hosted the Eurovision Song Contest on behalf of Ukraine.

As well as its designation as a European Capital of Culture in 2008 and Eurovision Song Contest host city, Liverpool has hosted many events of international significance including the MTV Europe Music Awards 2008, Music of Black Origin Awards, Royal de Luxe, 2022 World Artistic Gymnastics Championships and Turner Prize.

=== Nightlife ===
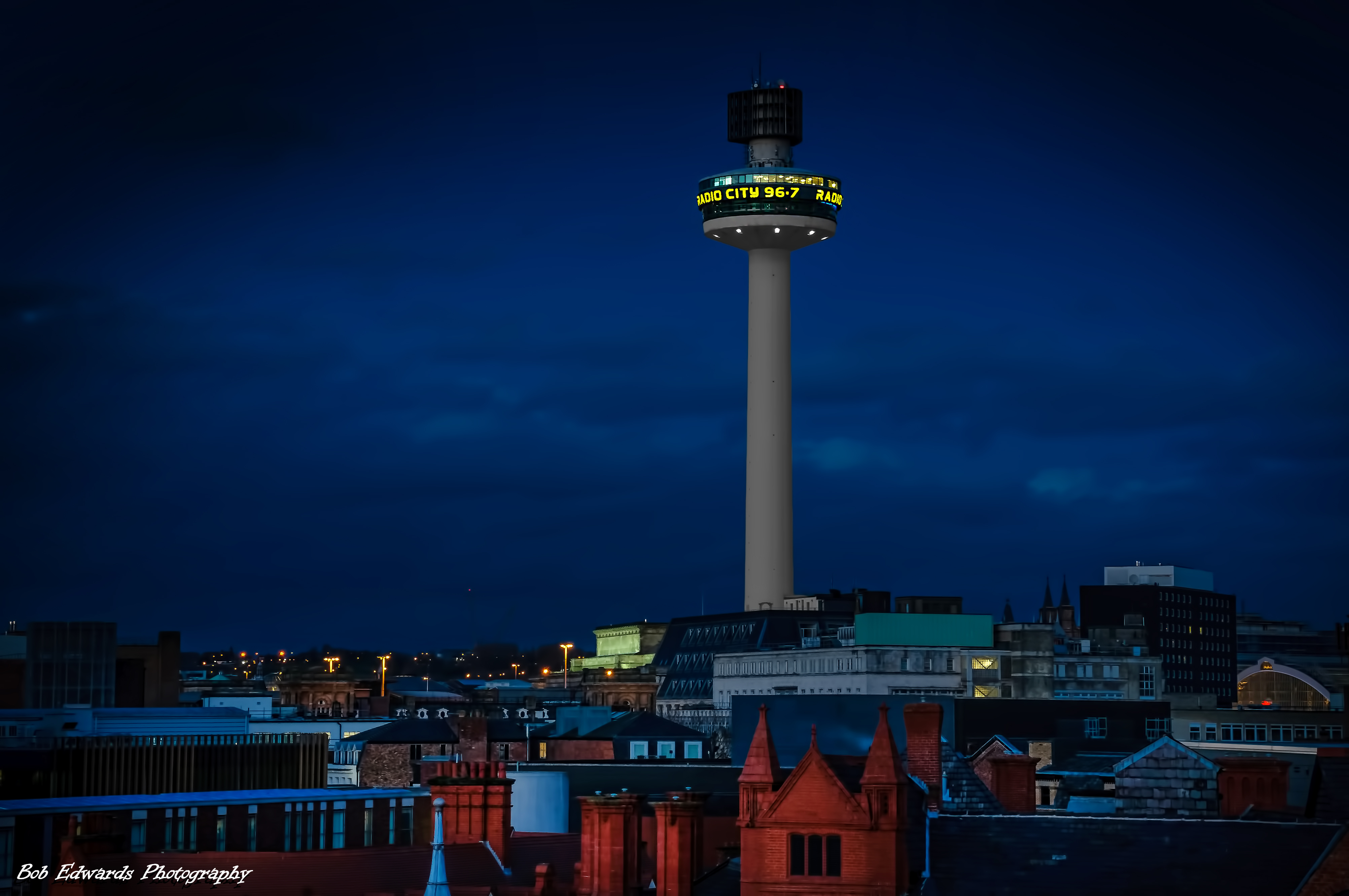
Liverpool's Radio City Tower at night

There are a number of different areas within the city centre that include large concentrations of bars, pubs and nightclubs. They include: Baltic Triangle, Castle Street with a collection of modern cocktail bars, Hardman Street, Mathew Street, Pride Quarter, Ropewalks (including Concert Square and Seel Street) and Royal Albert Dock.

Numerous bars and restaurants can be found around the Royal Albert Dock and Pier Head, whilst Concert Square is a more popular destination for students and young adults. The Cavern Club, which was made famous by The Beatles, is situated in the 'Cavern Quarter' in and around Mathew Street.

A large number of LGBT-friendly bars can be found in the Pride Quarter.

Data from the Liverpool BID Company showed that in 2022, 6 pm had the highest hourly footfall in the city centre, Saturday was the highest day of the week for footfall and October was the highest month of the year for footfall. The data was tracked using cameras throughout the city centre to track the movement of people between 6 pm and 6 am.

Liverpool has been awarded the Purple Flag every year since 2010 which is an international award to towns and cities who achieve high standards in managing the evening and night time economy. Liverpool has many uses of outdoor space, the provision of safe spaces and crime initiatives.

== Transport ==
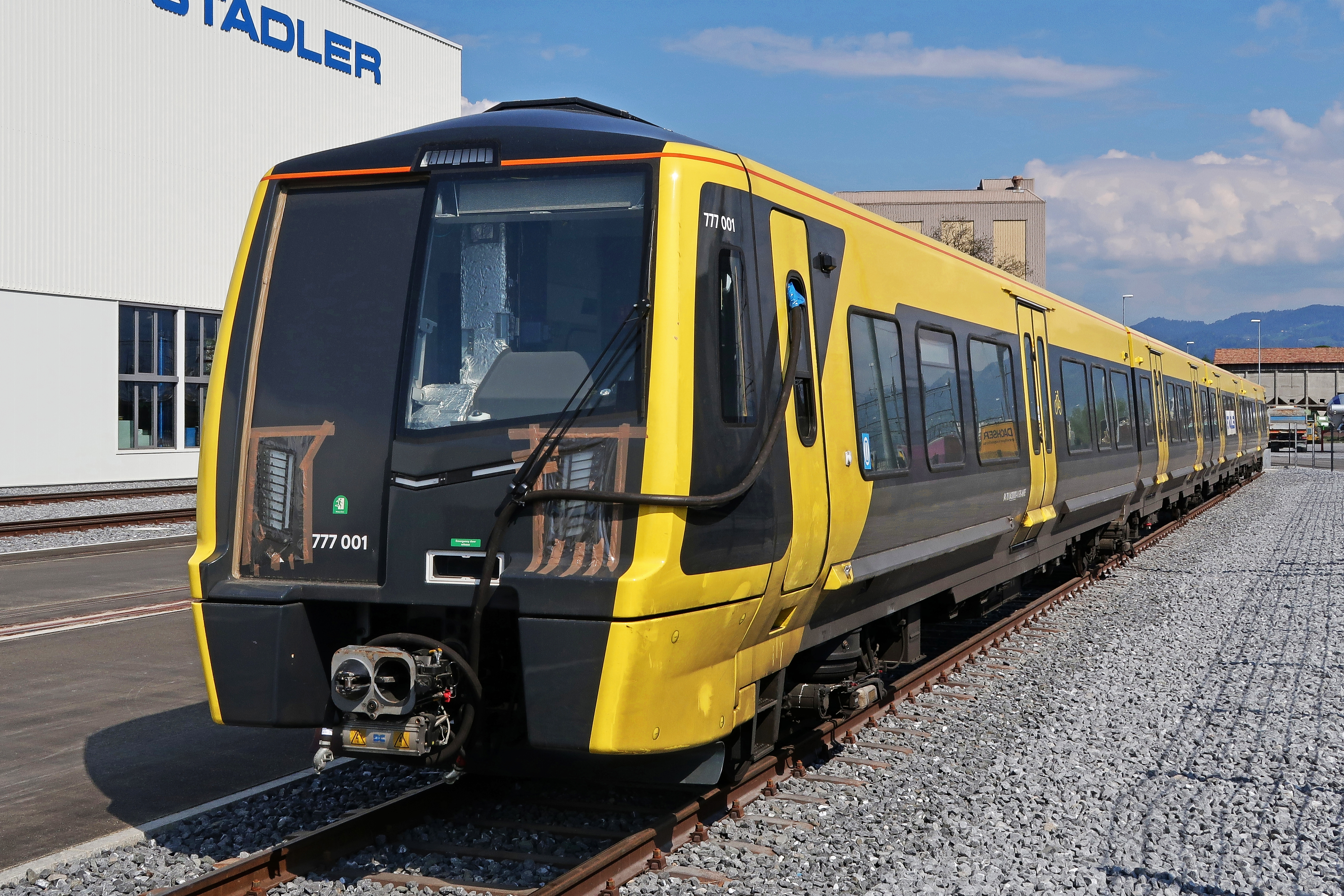
Merseyrail train which connects Liverpool city centre to its metropolitan area

Liverpool city centre has a transport network that is connected locally, nationally, and internationally by road, rail and sea.

=== Rail ===
Liverpool Lime Street railway station is the mainline railway terminus in Liverpool city centre and is one of the top ten most used train stations in Great Britain outside London. The station provides direct connections to numerous British cities including London, Birmingham, Manchester, Leeds, Sheffield, Nottingham, Newcastle, Norwich and Hull.

Liverpool is home to Merseyrail. It connects Liverpool city centre with the surrounding Liverpool City Region.

There are four stations in the city centre:

- Liverpool Lime Street railway station
- Liverpool Central railway station
- Moorfields railway station
- Liverpool James Street railway station

Sandhills station serves the northern fringe of the city centre whilst Brunswick serves the southern fringe. There is a new station planned to serve the Baltic Triangle area of the city centre.

Liverpool Central station and Moorfields station have platforms that serve both the Merseyrail Northern and Wirral lines, while Lime Street underground and James Street station are located on the Wirral line. The Lime Street mainline station also provides local services on the Merseyrail City line.

Over three and a quarter miles of disused rail tunnels lie under the city centre, Wapping Tunnel and Waterloo Tunnel/Victoria Tunnel.

=== Road ===
Numerous A roads lead into Liverpool city centre including the A5036, A5047, A5052, A5053, A562, A565, A580 and the A59. The Kingsway Tunnel and Queensway Tunnel, which are both toll roads, run under the River Mersey connecting Liverpool city centre to Wallasey and Birkenhead respectively.

=== Bus and coach ===
There are numerous bus stops and stations across Liverpool city centre, however, the main interchanges are Queen Square bus station and Liverpool One bus station which are managed by Merseytravel. They are served primarily by Arriva North West and Stagecoach Merseyside. There are services to all corners of the city and as far afield as Chester and Preston. National Express coaches serve destinations around the UK and stop at the Liverpool One bus station.

Liverpool City Explorer, Liverpool FC Explorer and Beatles Liverpool Explorer by Maghull Coaches offer open top tours of the city by double decker bus.

=== Cycling ===
National Cycle Route 56 and National Cycle Route 810 passes through Liverpool city centre.

=== Maritime transport ===
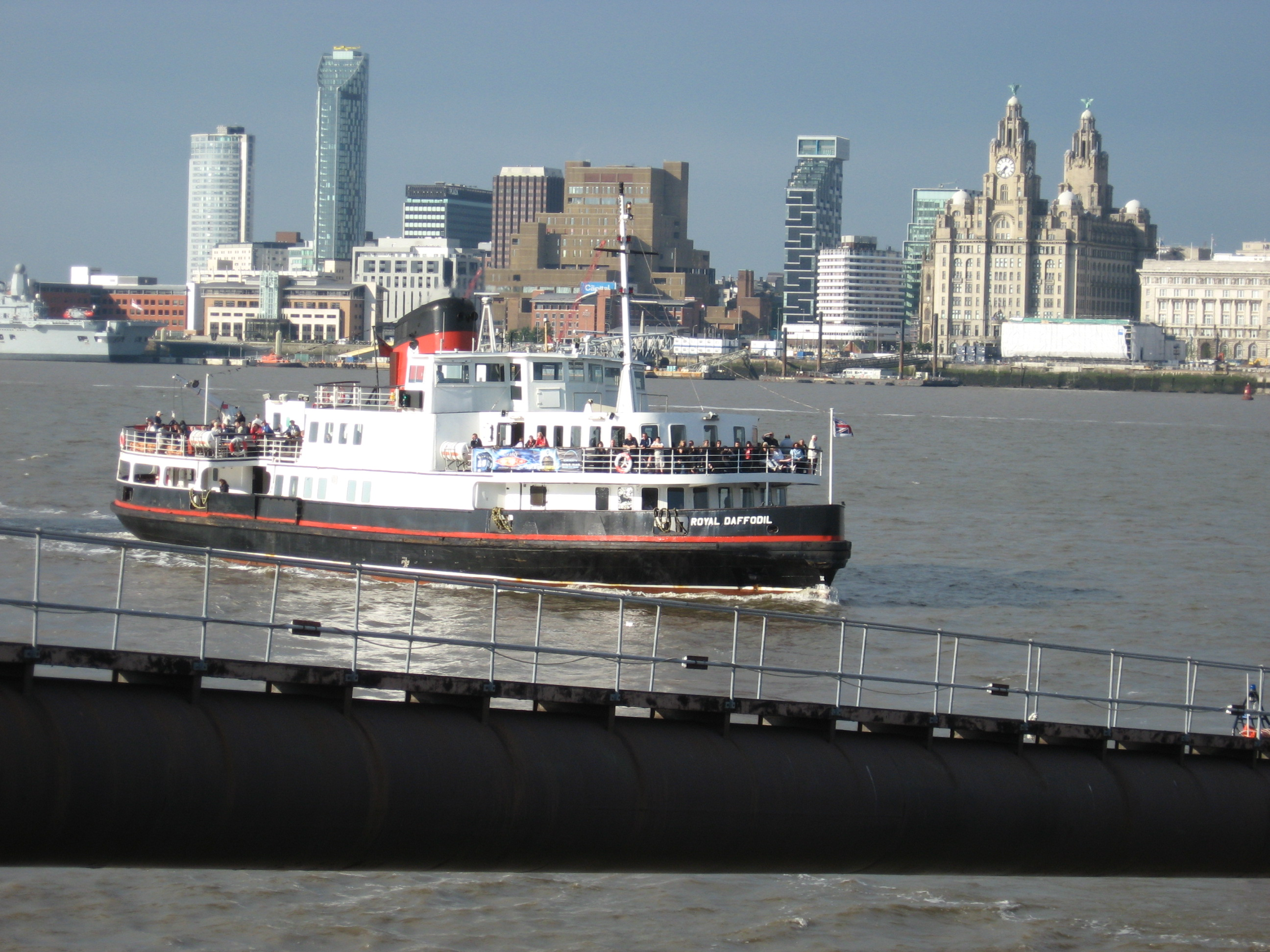
Mersey Ferry Royal Daffodil

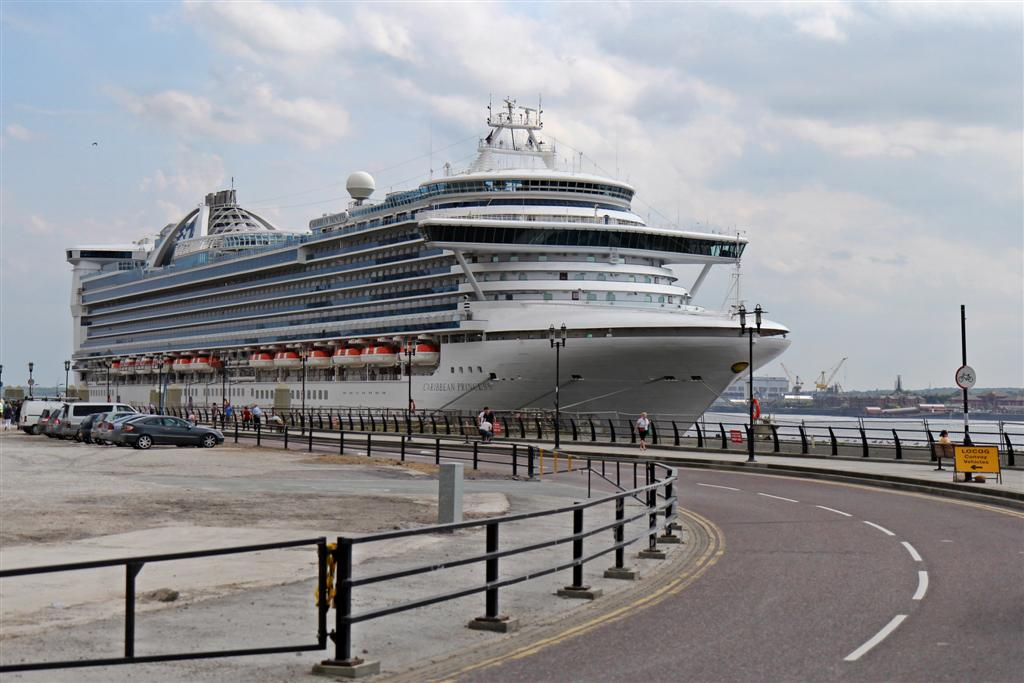
Liverpool Cruise Terminal

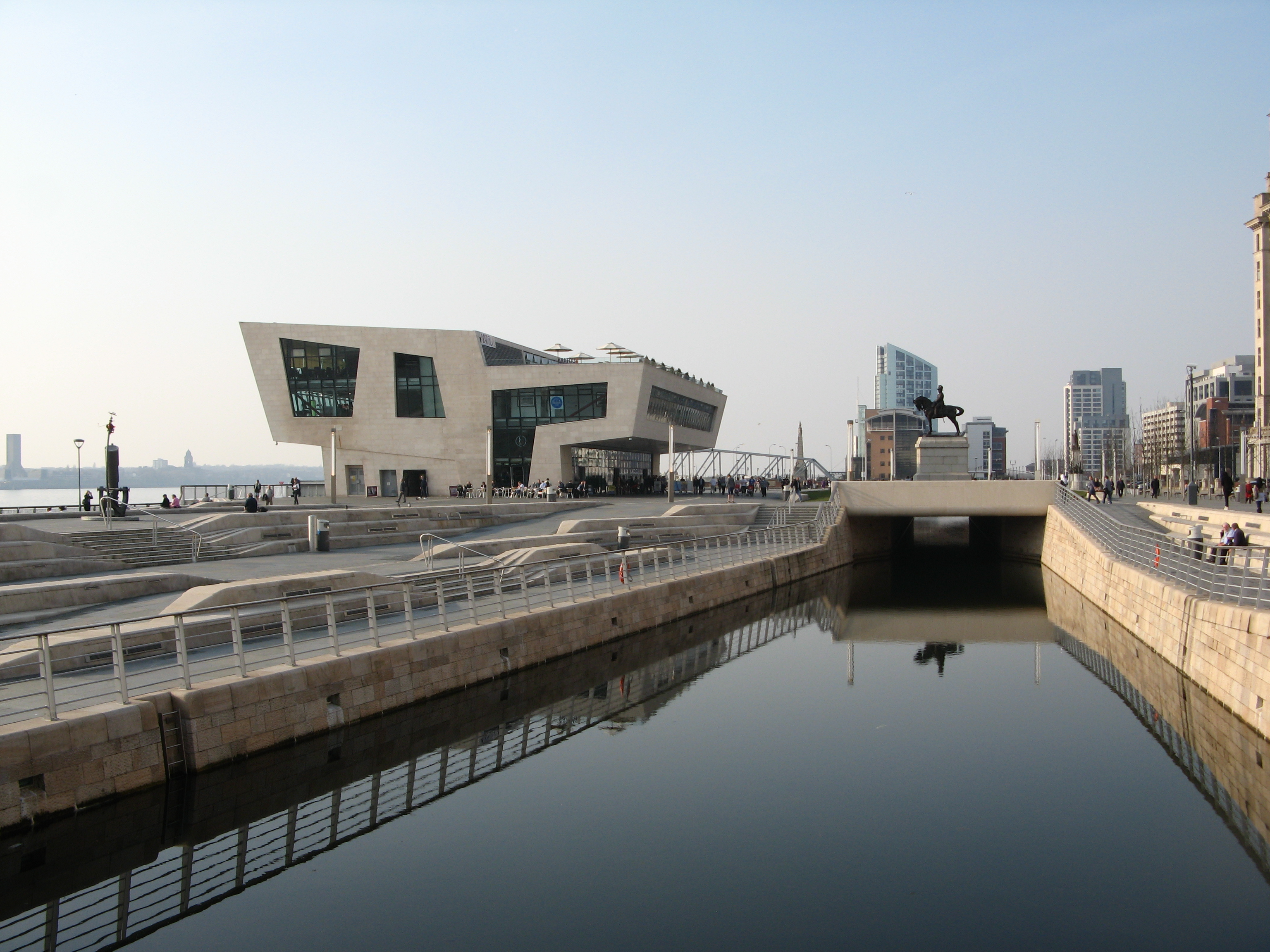
Leeds and Liverpool Canal Liverpool Canal Link

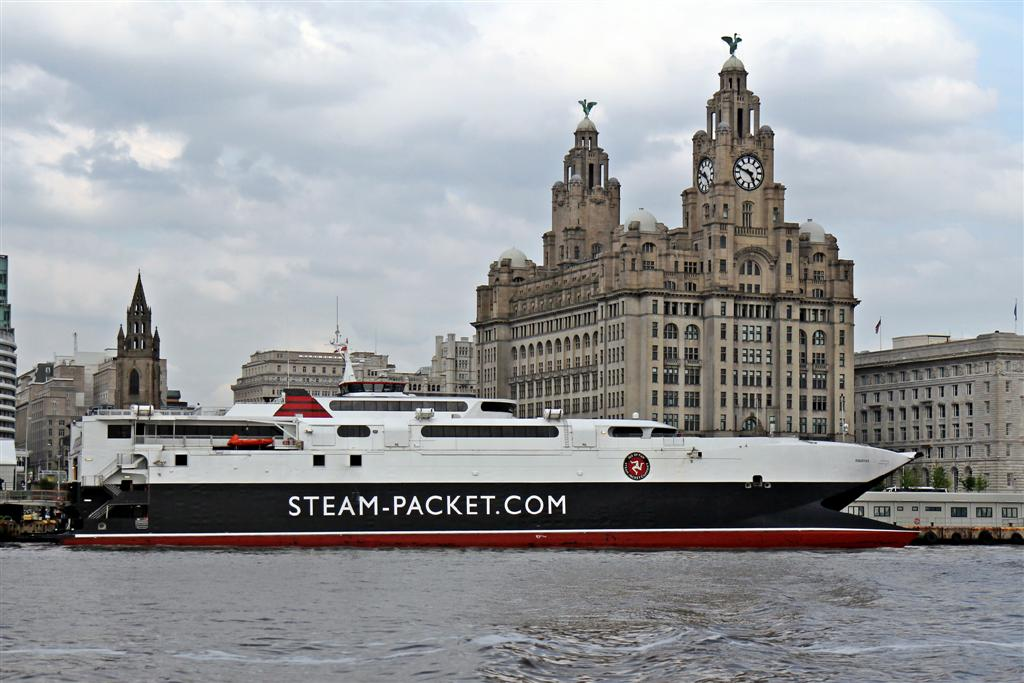
Isle of Man Steam Packet Manannan

Maritime transport connects Liverpool city centre directly with the rest of the United Kingdom, the Isle of Man, Ireland and around the world.

Daily ferry crossings operate between Liverpool and Dublin and vessels transport both passengers and cargo. Ferries from Liverpool to Belfast, Northern Ireland, depart from The Stena Line Liverpool Port at Twelve Quays terminal, Birkenhead.

Direct ferries between Liverpool city centre and the Isle of Man are provided by the Isle of Man Steam Packet Company and operate during the summer season from a terminal on Triskelion Way since 2024.

The Mersey Ferry operates regular crossings between the Pier Head and the Wirral Peninsula for commuters, tourists and special events. Ferry trips are also provided from Liverpool city centre to the Manchester Ship Canal.

Leeds and Liverpool Canal runs directly into Liverpool city centre via the Liverpool Canal Link at Pier Head. This enables boats to sail directly in to central Liverpool from around the UK.

Liverpool Cruise Terminal, adjacent to the Pier Head, serves long-distance passenger cruises to destinations such as France, Spain, Norway, Sweden, Iceland, Germany, Netherlands, Finland and Russia. It is served by Fred. Olsen Cruise Lines, Ambassador Cruise Line and others.

Liverpool Marina allows yachts, powerboats, canal boats, narrow boats, barges and rigid inflatable boats from around the UK and the world to arrive directly in to central Liverpool.

=== History ===
Five stations on the Liverpool Overhead Railway were in Liverpool city centre (Pier Head connecting to Liverpool Tramways Company main hub, James St, Customs House/Canning and Wapping Dock) from 1893 until the line's closure in 1956. On what is now the Northern Line, Liverpool St James railway station was also open until 1917 and Crown Street railway station until 1972. Liverpool Exchange was replaced by Moorfields.

== Universities and colleges ==
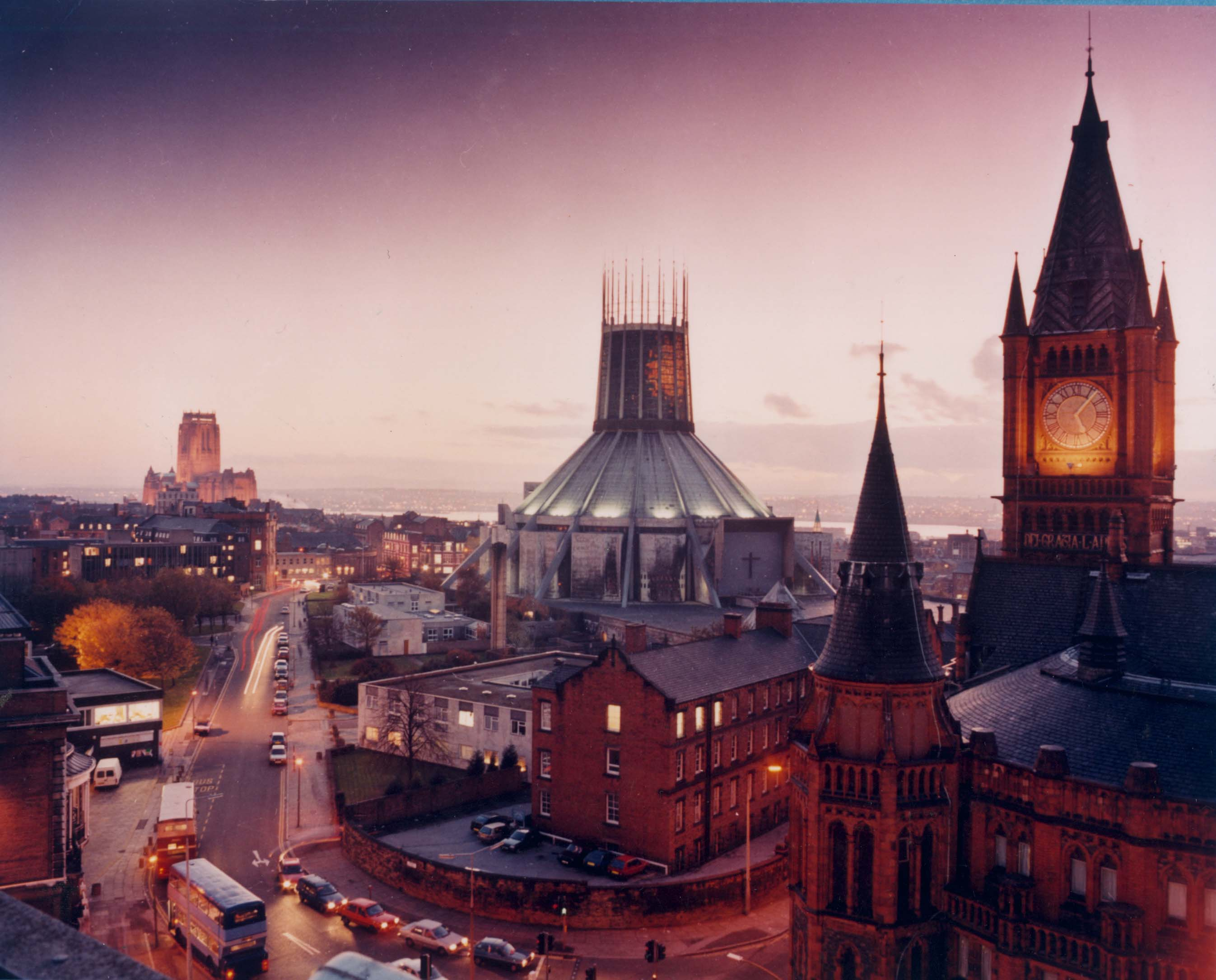
University of Liverpool campus at dusk

Liverpool city centre contains the campuses of four universities and a significant number of higher education providers offering students degree level courses.

The four city centre based universities are:

- Liverpool Hope University
- Liverpool Institute for Performing Arts
- Liverpool John Moores University
- University of Liverpool

Higher education providers include:

- The City of Liverpool College
- Liverpool International College
- Liverpool School of Tropical Medicine
- SAE Institute

Combined, they have a student population of somewhere between 60,000 and 70,000 as of 2023. A large number of these students live in accommodation in the city centre.

The University of Liverpool is largely sited around Mount Pleasant. Some of the buildings possessed by the University of Liverpool in Liverpool city centre include the Harold Cohen Library, the Liverpool Guild of Students and the Victoria Building. Liverpool John Moores University has two campuses in Liverpool city centre, one at Byrom Street and one at Mount Pleasant also.

The Liverpool Business School, and John Moores Students' Union are part of LJMU.
