= John Moores Students' Union =

Students' union of Liverpool John Moores University

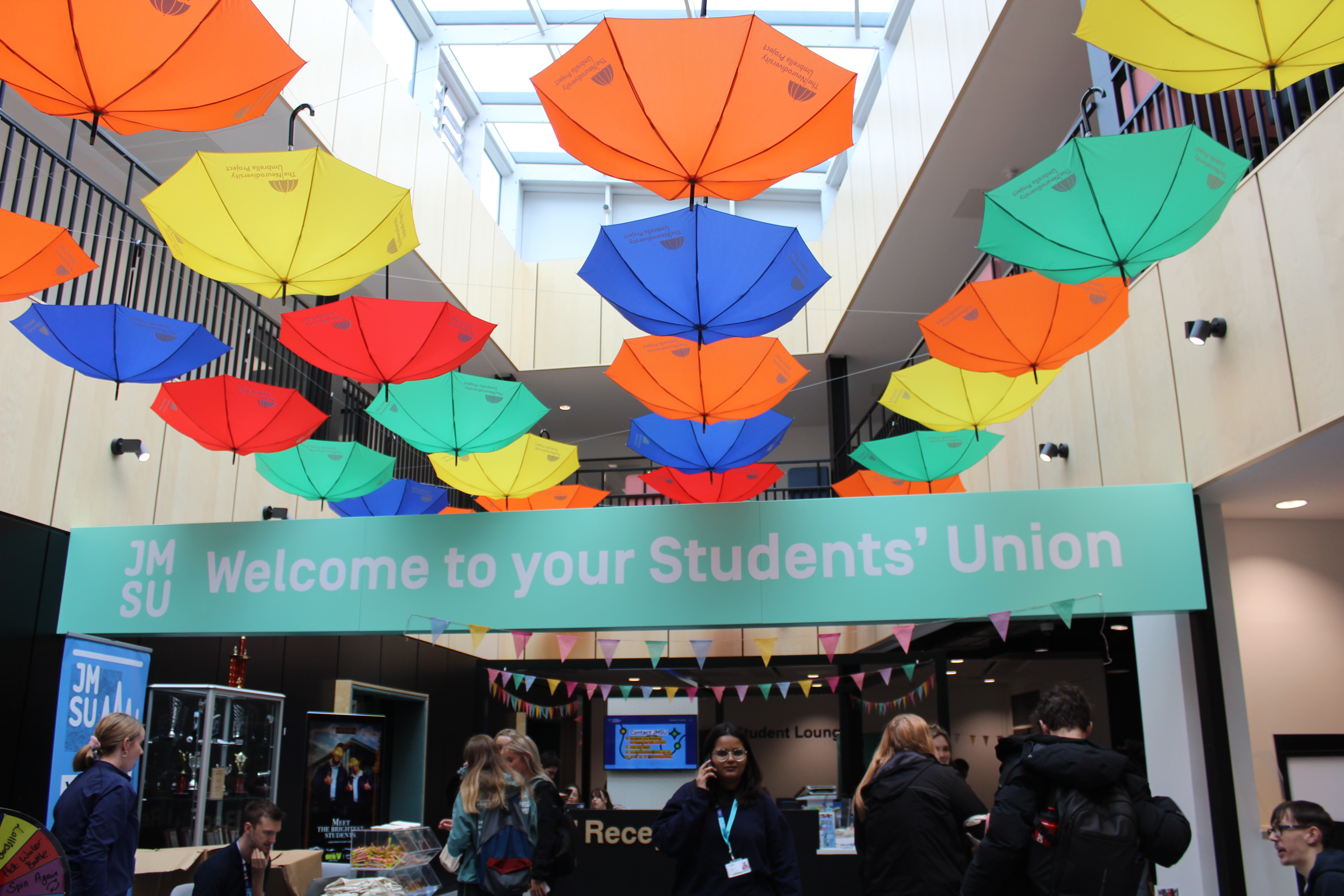
- Institution: Liverpool John Moores University
- Location: Student Life Building, 10 Copperas Hill, Liverpool, England
- Established: 1992 (as Liverpool Students' Union)
- President: Jasmine Howard
- Other officers: Shaquita Corry Vice President Education; Alexandria Jones Vice President Community and Wellbeing; Clodagh McErlean Vice President Activities
- Members: c. 27,000 total
- Affiliations: National Union of Students
- Website: jmsu.co.uk

John Moores Students' Union (JMSU) (Note: officially the Liverpool John Moores University Students' Union; formerly the Liverpool Students' Union (LSU or LiverpoolSU)) is the students' union of Liverpool John Moores University (LJMU) in Liverpool, England; membership is automatic upon enrolment within the university.

The students' union currently represents around 27,000 students studying at LJMU, located primarily in Liverpool. The current president is Jasmine Howard, who was elected for the 2023–2024 term.

== History ==
JMSU is a students' union for the purposes of the Education Act 1994. Under section 67 of the Act, all students of the university are by law automatically members of the union unless they deliberately opt out; the role of JMSU is to represent this body of membership.

The union operates from 5 sites across the university, with its central base located within the John Foster Building.

In May 2014, JMSU moved from their main base at the Haigh Building to the nearby John Foster Building and a number of hub sites across campus to become better placed for LJMU students. In 2021, JMSU moved from the John Foster Building, to the Student Life Building, located on the university's new development on Copperas Hill.

== Membership ==
The students' union currently has 2 membership grades which includes:

- Full Members - Students currently studying at Liverpool John Moores University and the elected Student Officers.
- Strategic Members - Trustees who are not full members, the chief executive officer and JMSU staff

A policy change in August 2026, removed the following memberships including:

- Associate Members - Former full members who support the union and apply for life membership

The students' union represents the 27,000 students of the 2023/24 intake of the university.

== Location ==
John Moores Students' Union (JMSU) operates from 5 sites across the university, with its central base being within the John Foster Building. In May 2014, JMSU moved from their main base at the Haigh Building to the nearby John Foster Building and a number of hub sites across campus to become better placed for LJMU students.

The Haigh Building was named after long serving Union secretary, Sheila Haigh who retired in 1983, the year the building opened. The site was demolished and now houses a student accommodation block, alongside a new School of Education building for the university, completed in 2020.

Within the John Foster Building can be found the Union's central offices, where a number of departments are based:

- Student Opportunities & Development: a team focused on the university and union's sports teams and societies, volunteering opportunities and community engagement activity.
- Student Voice & Campaigns: a team here to ensure that student feel supported in their time at university, with a dedicated academic advice service, representation functions and support for elected student officers.
- Marketing, Events & Business Development: a team that ensures students know what is going on in the university, union and in the wider city through marketing, communications and working with businesses in the city to provide large-scale events. The JMSU Freshers' Fair typically takes place at the M&S Bank Arena, where over 12,000 students attend each year.

Also within the John Foster Building is LJMU Student Radio, the union's central services team and the union's media sales trading company, Liverpool Student Media Limited.

== Governance ==
=== Executive student officers ===
The union is headed by an executive committee consisting of four student officers, who take a sabbatical year to work full-time for the union and to represent students at Liverpool John Moores University. They are responsible for the decision making and running of the union, however are answerable to the whole student body.

For the 2023/24 academic year and elected in March 2023, the elected student officers are:

Student Office	Incumbent
President	Jasmine Howard
Vice President for Education	Shaquita Corry
Vice President for Community and Wellbeing	Alexandria Jones
Vice President for Activities	Clodagh McErlean

=== Board of trustees ===
The Board of Trustees are responsible for overseeing the management and administration of the union, making the financial decisions, responding to student demands and ensuring activities are within union self-interest and remain within the law. The board meets twelve times each year and consists of 12 trustees: 4 elected student officers, 4 student trustees and 4 community trustees.

On behalf of the board, the chair and vice-chair appoint the union chief executive, who is responsible for its functioning on a day-to-day basis alongside union staff. The chair of the board is ex officio the President

=== Constitution ===
JMSU's constitution establishes the union and outlines the ways in which members can engage in the union, and the procedures the union undertake to make it better whilst remaining democratic.

The current constitution was adopted in 2016. It is approved by the JMSU Board of Trustees and regulated by the LJMU Board of Governors.

== Controversy ==
In 2018, the union was forced to introduce guidelines on fancy dress after a society held a homeless-themed party. The Trampoline Society had held these parties, named "tramp night", annually, one of which was reported on in the student newspaper Liverpool Tab in 2018. Students at the party reportedly wore ripped clothes, painted their faces to make them appear dirty, and wore signs that had sentences such as "spare change?", "meet me at the bar", and "give me your change and I'll change your night".

In 2018, news of these annual parties became widespread and drew a lot of criticism. The word 'tramp' is a common slang term for homeless people in the United Kingdom and is sometimes viewed as derogatory.

When approached by the student newspaper Liverpool Tab, the official society itself stated, “We realise now, that our annual choice of costume could cause offence and are sorry for any upset this may have caused, it was never our intention. We will of course be changing our annual fancy dress theme and once again apologise to anyone who may have found this inappropriate.” The John Moores Students' Union started an investigation stated that they "do not endorse fancy dress that could be deemed as offensive or discriminatory". The union then announced that it would introduce guidelines regarding fancy dress and potential inappropriate or discriminatory behaviour regarding this or themes for parties hosted by societies.
