= Economy of Liverpool =

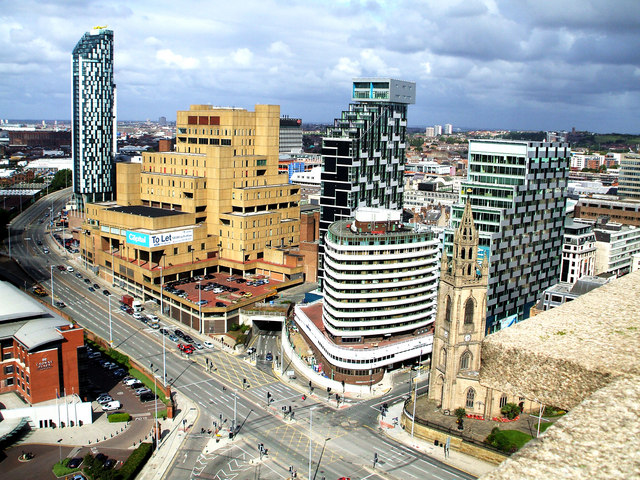
- Liverpool's commercial district

Statistics
- Population: 503,740 (2023)
- GDP: £20.3 billion (2023)
- GDP per capita: £40,392 (2023)
- Labour force: 232,100 / 67.5% in employment (Jan–Dec 2023) (Note: In employment and aged 16 or over (quantity) or aged 16–64 (percent))
- Labour force by occupation: List: 25.3% Professional; 20.7% Associate professional; 11.2% Administrative and secretarial; 9.8% Caring, leisure and other service; 9.3% Managers, directors and senior officials; 7.7% Skilled trades; 6.2% Sales and customer service; 5.0% Process plant and machine operatives; 3.9% Elementary occupations; (Jan–Dec 2023) (Note: Percent is a proportion of all persons in employment aged 16 and over)
- Unemployment: 17,400 / 7.0% (Jan–Dec 2023) (Note: Unemployed aged 16 and over. Percent is a proportion of economically active.)
- Average gross salary: £646.40 per week (2023) (Note: Median gross weekly pay for full time employees resident in Liverpool)

External
- Exports: £3.2 billion (2021) (Note: Goods and services)
- Export goods: £1.2 billion (2021) (Note: Excluding services)
- Imports: £3.2 billion (2021)
- Import goods: £2.2 billion (2021)

The economy of Liverpool encompasses a wide range of economic activity that occurs within and surrounding the city of Liverpool, England.

As of 2023, the city's primary urban area, which includes Knowsley, had a population of 662,983 making it the tenth largest in the UK.

In 2017, the Liverpool City Region experienced the UK's highest growth in real GVA, increasing by 3.3%.

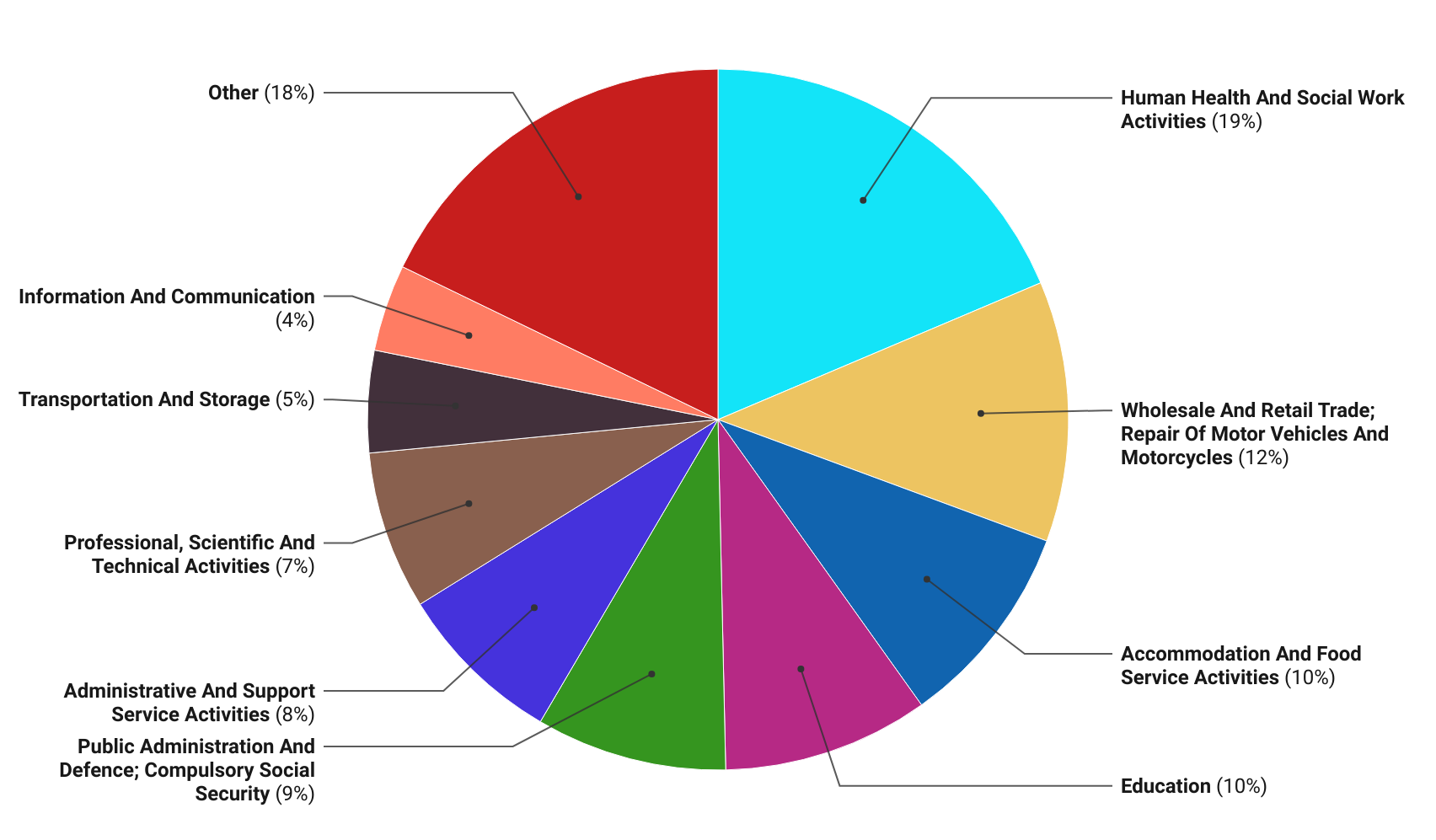
Employment in Liverpool by percentage of industry in 2021

== Economic output ==
In 2021, the gross value added for Liverpool was £14.29 billion and gross domestic product was £15.91 billion.

== Service sector ==
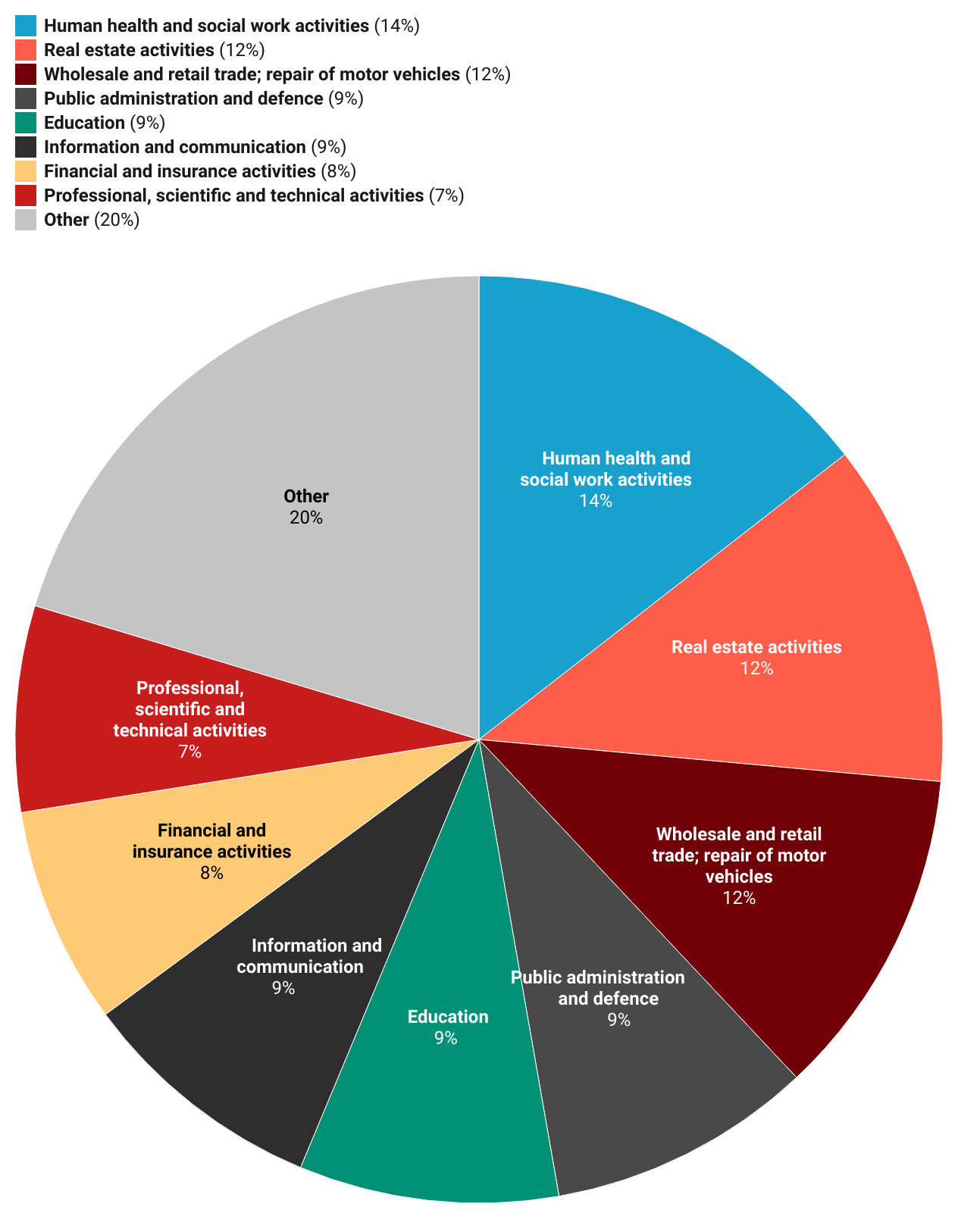
Economic output of Liverpool services sector in 2018 by percentage of activity, totalling £11,460m in December 2019 prices

In common with much of the rest of the UK today, Liverpool's economy is dominated by service sector industries, both public and private. In 2007, over 60% of all employment in the city was in the public administration, education, health, banking, finance and insurance sectors.

=== Health and social care ===
The health and social care sector represents the single largest industry within Liverpool in terms of economic output, making-up 7% (£1.66m) of regional gross value added (GVA) (December 2019 basic prices). The sector is also the single largest employer, representing 16.7% (32,804 jobs) of all employment within the city in 2011.

=== Public administration ===
Liverpool is an important centre for public administration having offices from several government departments and non-departmental public bodies, in addition to local government agencies. Agencies such as HM Passport Office, Criminal Records Bureau, and Her Majesty's Revenue and Customs all have offices in the city.

=== Banking, finance and insurance ===
The banking, finance and insurance sectors are one of the fastest growing areas of Liverpool's economy with a 5.3% increase in jobs in these areas 2006/07. Major private sector service industry concerns have also invested in Liverpool especially the financial services sector with Barclays, JPMorgan, Alliance & Leicester, Royal Bank of Scotland Group and the Bank of Ireland either opening or expanding their sites, a number of major call centres have opened in recent years too and the professional advice sector.

== Tourism ==
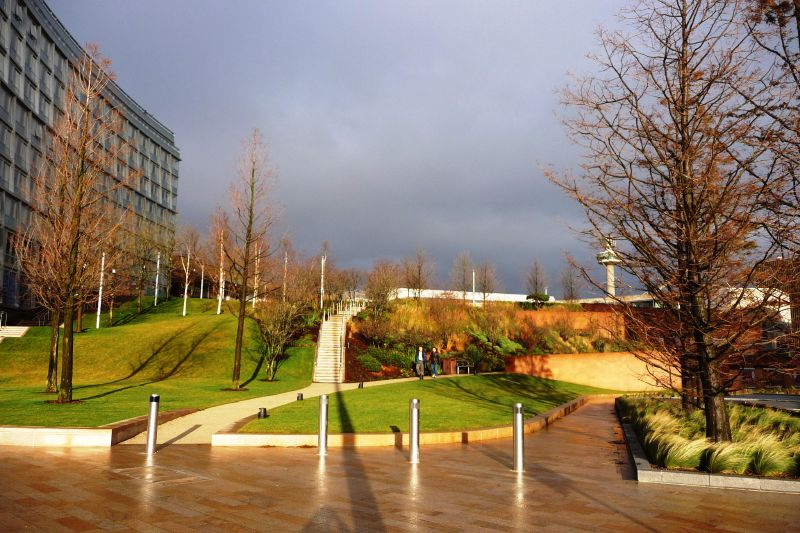
Chavasse Park, located on the waterfront by Liverpool One

Tourism is a major factor in the economy. It is estimated that in 2018 38m visitors came to the city, an estimated 7.4% increase in numbers and a 5% increase in the number of staying visitors, up to 2.7m. It is estimated that in 2017 foreign tourism brought in £358 million to the local economy. The increase in tourism has led to a great increase in the provision of high quality services such as hotels, restaurants and clubs. In 2008, Liverpool city centre had 37 hotels, apart hotels and guesthouses offering a total of 3,481 bedrooms. By 2017 this figure had risen to 67 locations with 6,600 bedrooms available. Several other hotels are planned to open in the next two years leading to an estimated 14% increase in the number of rooms available.

Liverpool is one of the few cities in the world where cruise liners can berth in the city centre, and from 2008 a significant number of ships called at Liverpool's cruise liner terminal, including the Grand Princess and the Queen Elizabeth 2. From 2013 Liverpool was able to offer turnaround operations from the cruise liner terminal attracting cruise passengers from the north of England and the Midlands. Liverpool City Council unveiled preliminary plans for a new £50 million cruise terminal in September 2017. The new facility is intended to be built slightly further down the Mersey than the exiting terminal, at Princes Dock where the old wooden landing stage currently lies. The new terminal would be able to handle ships with up to 3,600 passengers and would include dedicated passport control as well as a cafe. Surveying work for the new facility began in May 2018 with work expected to start in autumn of the year with an estimated completion date of 2020.

Liverpool and its boroughs have a large number of sandy beaches accessible by Merseyrail, which prove popular in the summer months.

== Film industry ==
Liverpool has been a longstanding popular location for the television and film industries. The unique and diverse architecture and geography of Liverpool provides a dynamic offering for producers, including as a double for cities around the world, including New York and London, making it the second most filmed city in the UK.

The Liverpool Film Office helps to promote the city as a destination for new film productions, connecting industry with local partners to facilitate filming and stimulate investment. 2019 saw filming bring an estimated £17.6m into the city's economy, with 324 productions racking up a total of 1,750 production days.

In June 2018, Twickenham Studios announced plans to take 8,000 sq metres of space in the Littlewoods Pools building. They will also use two new 2,000-sq metre sound stages which are to be built next to the main building.

== Retail ==
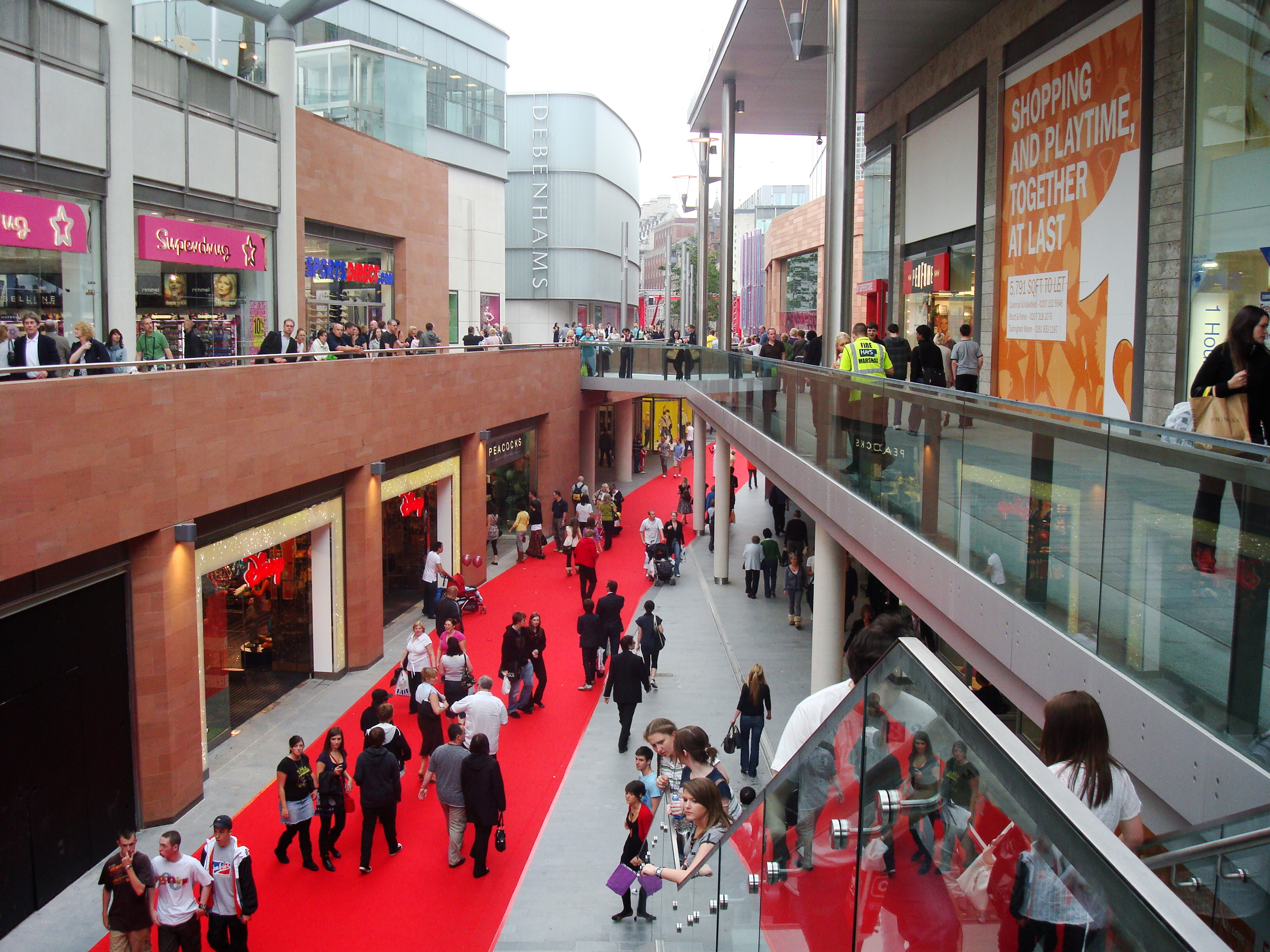
Liverpool One shopping complex

Liverpool's main shopping area consists of numerous streets and shopping centres. Amongst the larger predominantly retail orientated streets in Liverpool city centre are Church Street, Lord Street, Bold Street and Mathew Street. Liverpool One opened fully in October 2008 being the redevelopment of a large part of the postcode area L1—hence the name. It is also partly built on the old Chavasse Park, but much of the park still remains.

Previous to the opening of the Liverpool One complex, St. John's Shopping Centre was the largest shopping centre in Liverpool, it still remains the largest covered shopping centre in the city.

Clayton Square Shopping Centre is also located in the very centre of the city as is Metquarter, an upmarket shopping centre consisting primarily of boutique stores which opened in 2006. New Strand Shopping Centre and New Mersey Shopping Park are two other large shopping complexes in the Liverpool Urban Area, in Bootle and Speke respectively.

== Knowledge economy ==
Growth in the areas of New Media has been helped by the existence of a relatively large computer game development community. Sony based one of only a handful of European PlayStation research and development centres in the city, after buying out noted software publisher Psygnosis. According to a 2006 issue of industry magazine 'Edge' (issue 162), the first professional quality PlayStation software developer's kits were largely programmed by Sony's Liverpool studio.

The Baltic Triangle, an area of the city centre that used to be associated with traditional industry, is now a hub of creative and digital businesses. Based in this area are companies such as games developer MilkyTea, and entertainment journalism website Karibu.

== Manufacturing sector ==
Car-manufacturing also takes place in the city at the Halewood plant where the Jaguar X-Type and Land Rover Freelander models are assembled. The X-Type ceased production in 2010 however, the new Range Rover Evoque filled the gap when production began in the Spring of 2011.

== Port of Liverpool ==
The Port of Liverpool serves as a significant contributor to economic activity in both Liverpool and the rest of the United Kingdom. Its geographical position has allowed it to become the UK's primary gateway for transatlantic commerce, with the port handling approximately 45% of trade between Britain and the United States. In 2024, the port facilitated exports valued at $11.5 billion and imports worth $16.9 billion, positioning it amongst the ten largest ports in the United Kingdom by trade volume.

The owner of Liverpool's port and airport, Peel Holdings, announced on 6 March 2007 that it had plans to redevelop the city's northern dock area with a scheme entitled Liverpool Waters, which may see the creation of 17,000 jobs and £5.5bn invested in the vicinity over a 50-year period. This is coupled with a sister scheme on the other side of the River Mersey, called Wirral Waters.

In recent years, the Port of Liverpool has seen somewhat of a revival, with both Japanese firm NYK and Danish firm Maersk Line locating their UK headquarters to the city.

The port was expanded with the construction of Liverpool2, a post-Panamax container terminal for ships wider than the Panama Canal locks. It is capable of handling ships carrying 13,500 containers, compared to the previous limit of 3,500.

== See also ==
- Liverpool § Economy
- Liverpool City Region § Economy
- Merseyside § Economy
