= Clayton Square Shopping Centre =

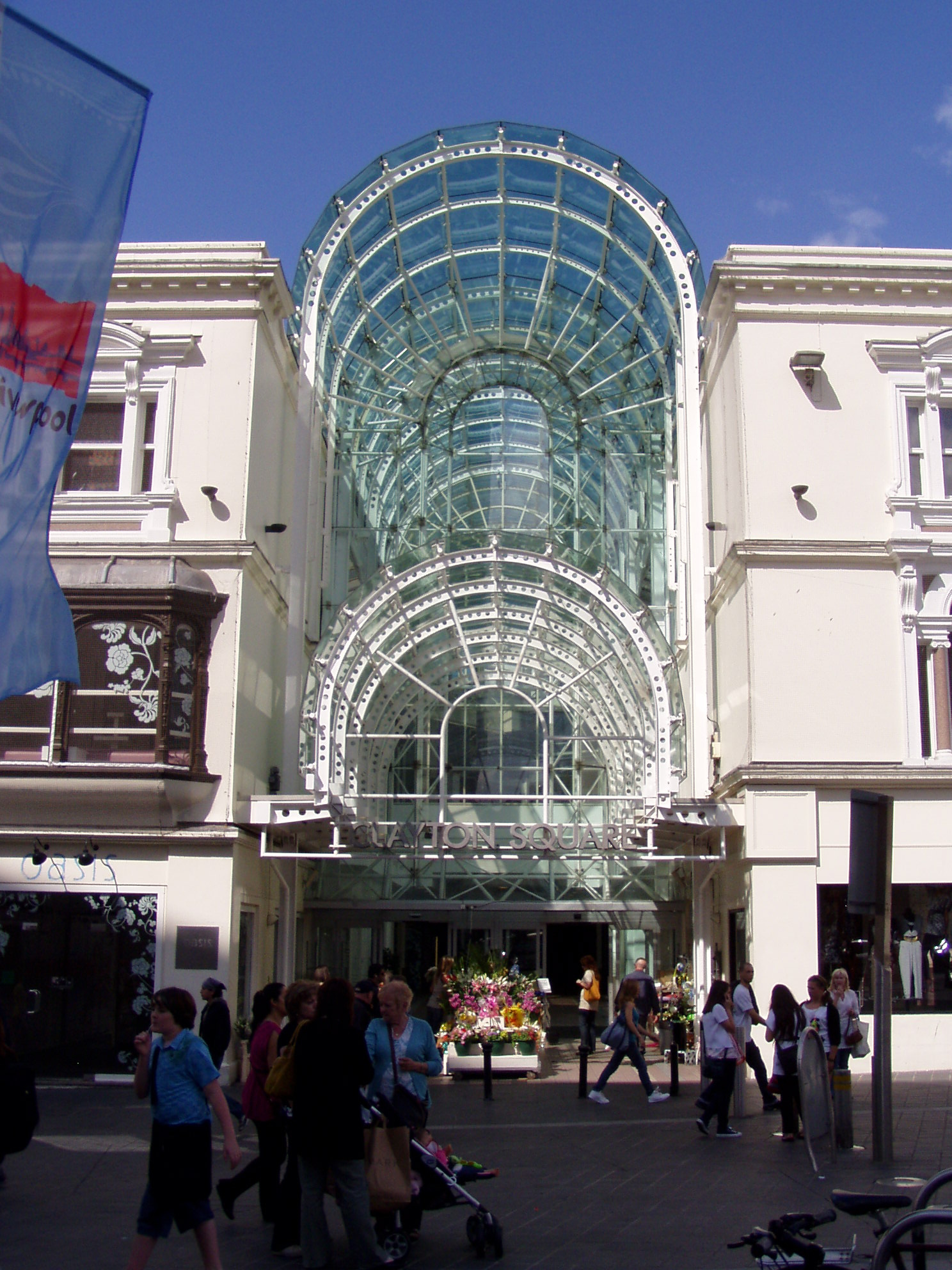
- Location: Liverpool, Merseyside, England
- Coordinates: 53.4054°N 2.9808°W
- Opened: 10th April 1989
- Owner: Redical Limited
- Num. of stores: 30
- Floors: 2
- Website: www.claytonsquare.co.uk

Clayton Square Shopping Centre is an inner-city shopping centre located in Liverpool, England. It is in close proximity to Liverpool Lime Street and Liverpool Central railway stations. It is the city's fourth largest shopping centre behind Liverpool One, St. John's Shopping Centre and Metquarter. Clayton Square sees tough competition from the likes of Liverpool One, St.Johns, Metquarter, Church Street, Lord Street and Bold Street.

In April 2010, Swedish hardware store Clas Ohlson opened its sixth UK store in Clayton Square occupying the former premises of Zavvi.

All businesses located in Clayton Square Shopping Centre are members of Retail and Leisure Liverpool BID. Clayton Square is one of the key shopping centres within the city, and works in partnership with other stakeholders in to improve the city centre.

In the summer of 2014 a major refit was begun, which was completed in December 2015. The refurbishment converted smaller units into larger retail units, opened the mall to its full atrium height, and public access to the upper floor was removed. The entrance on to Church Street was closed and converted into a unit, which is occupied by Wildwood Restaurant. Half of the floor space on the upper floor was turned in to a Gym whilst the other half will be a bowling alley (Lane 7).

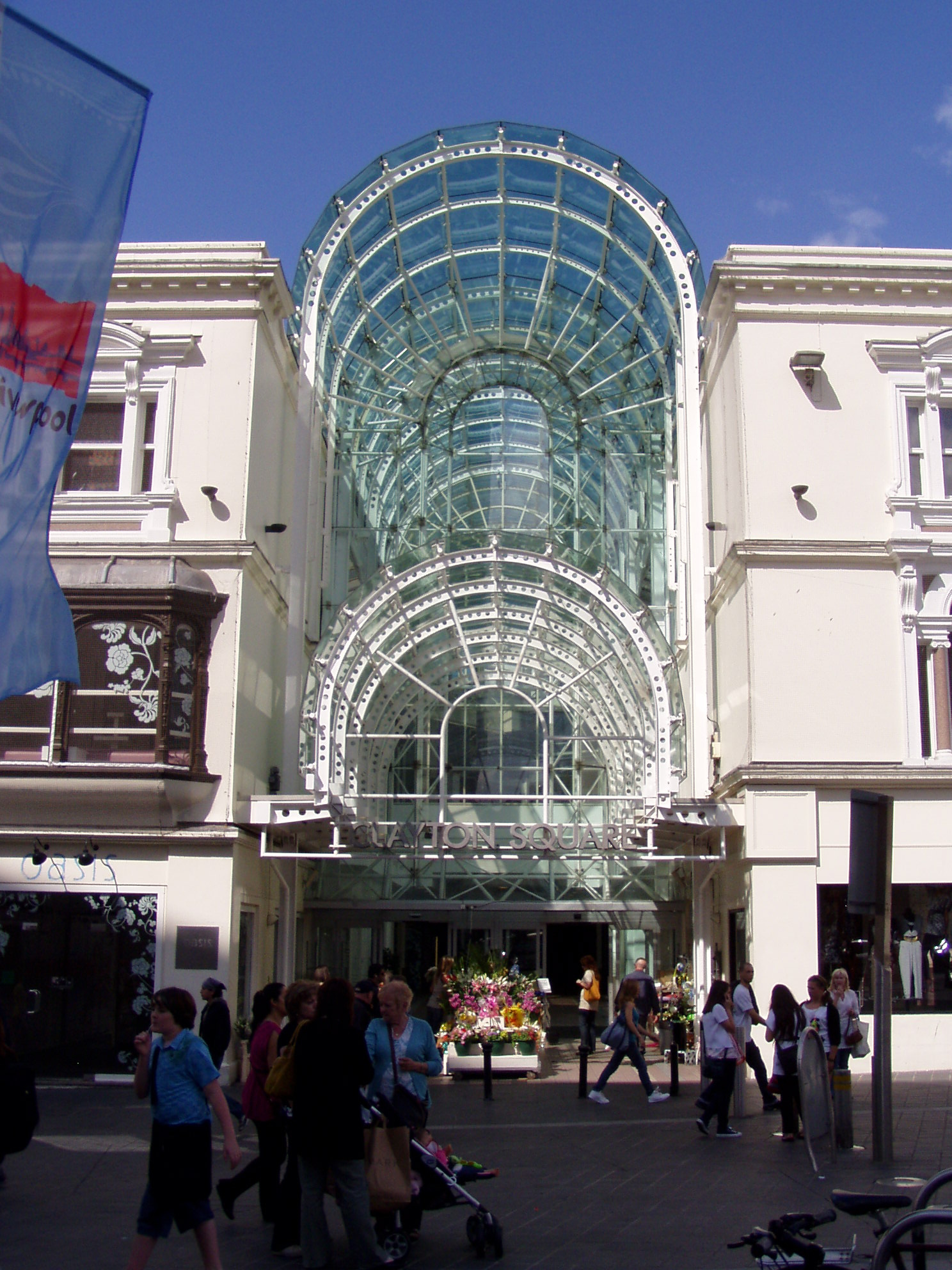
Clayton Square's Church Street entrance

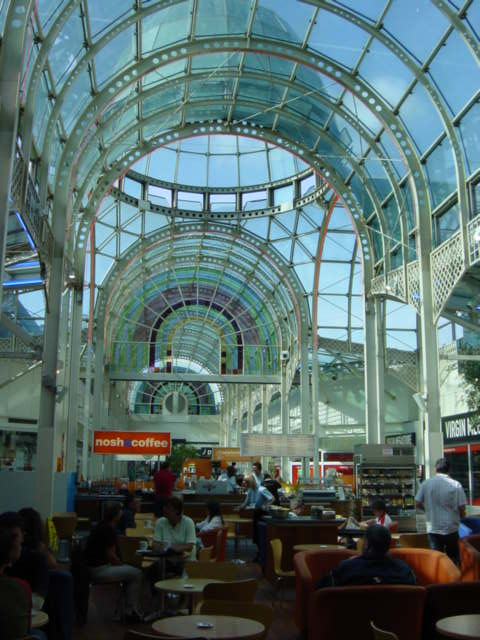
Interior of Clayton Square Shopping Centre

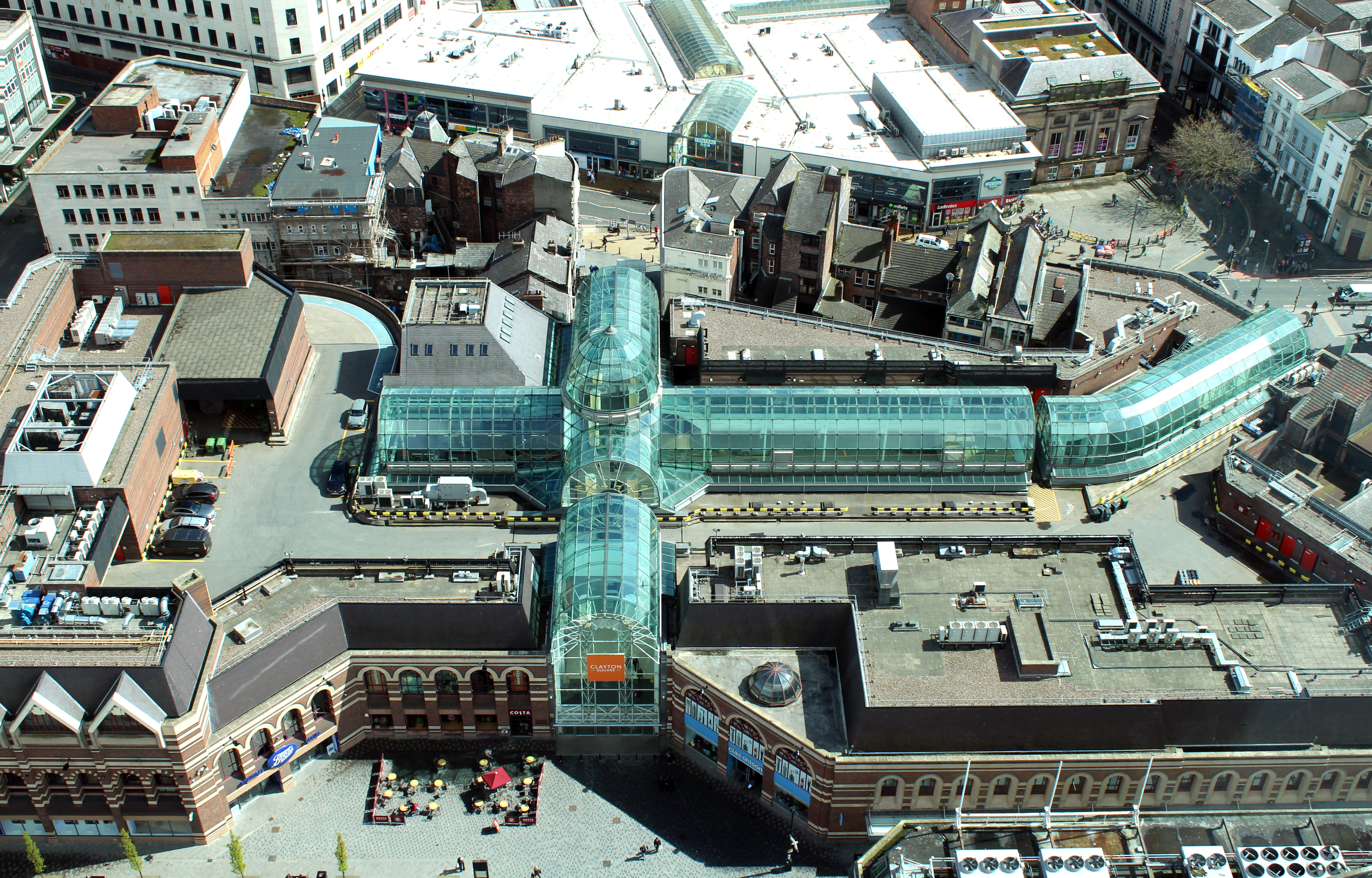
View from Radio City Tower

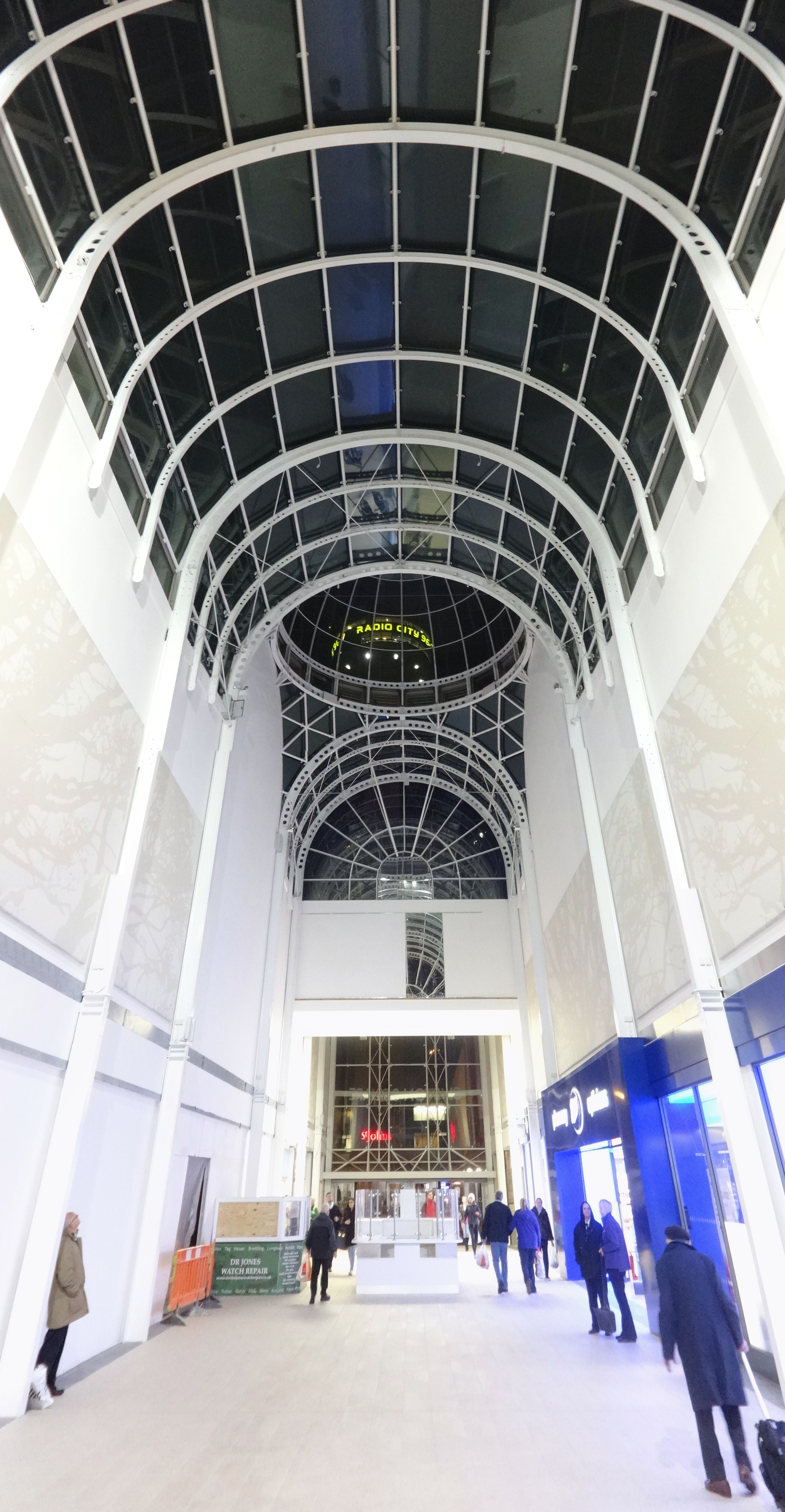
Partway through rebuild.
