= Retail & Leisure BID =

Liverpool business improvement district

- Location: Liverpool, England, United Kingdom
- Opened: 14 July 2003; 23 years ago
- Developer: Liverpool Leisure and Stores Committee and Liverpool City Council
- Manager: Bill Addy, Chief Executive.
- Num. of stores: 630
- Num. of anchor tenants: 8
- Floor area: Total area: 198,000 m^{2} (2,130,000 sq ft)
- Website: liverpoolbidcompany.com

Retail & Leisure BID is a business improvement district (BID) that represents over 650 businesses in the retail and leisure heart of Liverpool's city centre, covering a total area of 49 acres and including 61 streets, such as Bold Street, Church Street, Lord Street, the Cavern Quarter, Whitechapel, Williamson Square, Queen Square, Ranelagh Street and all inter-connecting streets. The BID aims to enhance the public services of the local authority by raising a 1.2% levy on its members' annual business rates. This five-year program is intended to provide a safe, clean, attractive, and well-promoted trading area within Liverpool's city centre.

Its core objective is to improve the experience for shoppers, visitors, and workers in the city center and establish the high standards necessary to support Liverpool's reputation as a premier European city. Key shopping centers in the area include: Cavern Walks, Clayton Square, Metquarter and St. Johns.

It operates under the umbrella of Liverpool BID Company, and it is a limited company by guarantee. It reports quarterly to an executive board and to an operating board whose members are re-elected annually at its Annual General Meeting (AGM). In May 2013, the BID sought to enter a third term through a ballot of its members, which would run until October 31, 2018.

However, in November 2013, the BID's Chief Executive, Ged Gibbons, was suspended without any explanation given.

== History ==
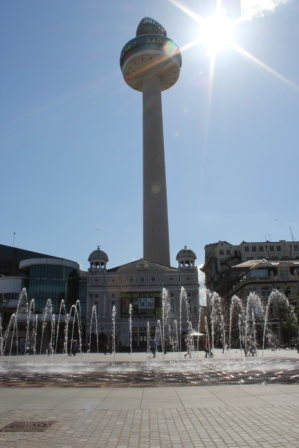
Williamson Square

The concept of BIDs originated in North America, where the initiative was developed in the 1970s.

In the UK a national BID pilot program was launched by the UK Government through the Regional Development Agencies. Liverpool Stores Committee and Liverpool City Council applied to establish City Central as a pilot BID in 2003.

The pilot period allowed businesses to understand the advantages and the role of BIDs within city centre management. Moreover, it gave enough time to develop business consultations, elaborate a proper business plan and strengthen networking and partnerships. Safety, event and marketing initiatives were established as tasters of a fully fledged BID.

After the approval of the Business Improvement District Regulations in 2004 by the UK Parliament, the creation of a proper BID was possible. The ballot took place in 2005 for a period of 3 years. It won the ballot with 62% in favour by numbers and 51% of the rateable value.

The second ballot was in 2008 for period of 5 years. Its influence area was increased in the second ballot due to Bold Street joining the BID. In the second ballot City Central 64% of the businesses were in favour and 68% by rateable value.

== Area ==
Liverpool is ranked as one of the UK's top five retail destinations and in the top 25 in Europe. The Main Retail Area is formed by City Central (49 acres) and Liverpool One (42 acres).

There are different areas within City Central:

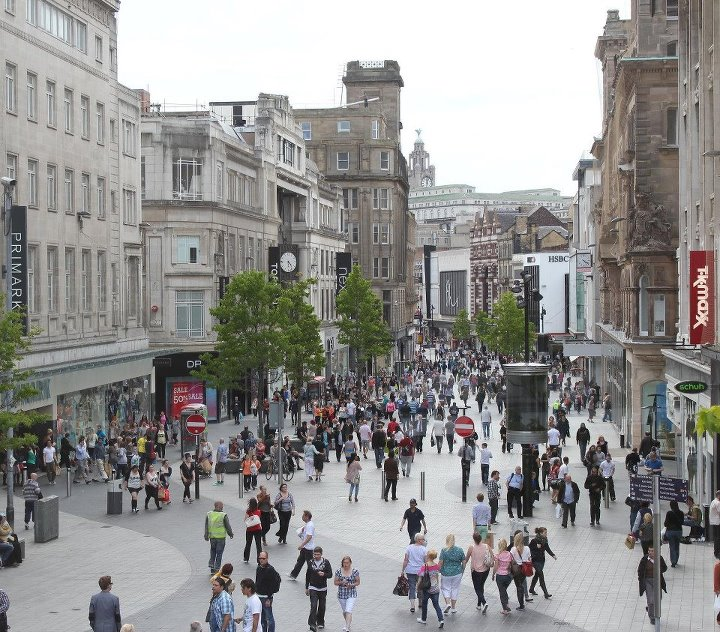
Church Street and Lord Street

- Church Street + Lord Street

They are the main retail streets in Liverpool city centre. Most of the anchor tenants are located here. It is the border between City Central and Liverpool ONE.

- Bold Street

Bold Street is regarded as one of the UK's best shopping streets due to its eclectic and charismatic retail mix of independent shops, cafes and bars. The Church of St Luke (AKA Bombed-out Church) is situated at the top end. Bold Street is included in the RopeWalks area, which is one of the most important night time economy areas in Liverpool.

- Metquarter

Metquarter, opened in 2005 and is a luxury shopping centre consisting primarily of boutique stores located on Whitechapel in Liverpool city centre and home to 40 stores. Metquarter is the third largest shopping centre in the city, behind Liverpool One and St. Johns. Recent new tenants include Jack & Wills, Illamasqua and Carluccio's.

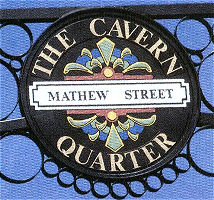
Mathew Street

- Cavern Quarter

World-famous for being the home of the Cavern Club which hosted The Beatles 292 times. The area also includes Cavern Walks, home to Cricket and Vivienne Westwood, and is one of the night time economy zones in the city.

Other notable non-retail members include Royal Court, Play house, Holiday Inn, Marriott Hotel and Athenaeum.

== Business plan ==
City Central delivers a range of services identified by businesses as their key targets and priorities outlined in the City Central business plan.

The four strands of the business plan are:

=== Safety ===
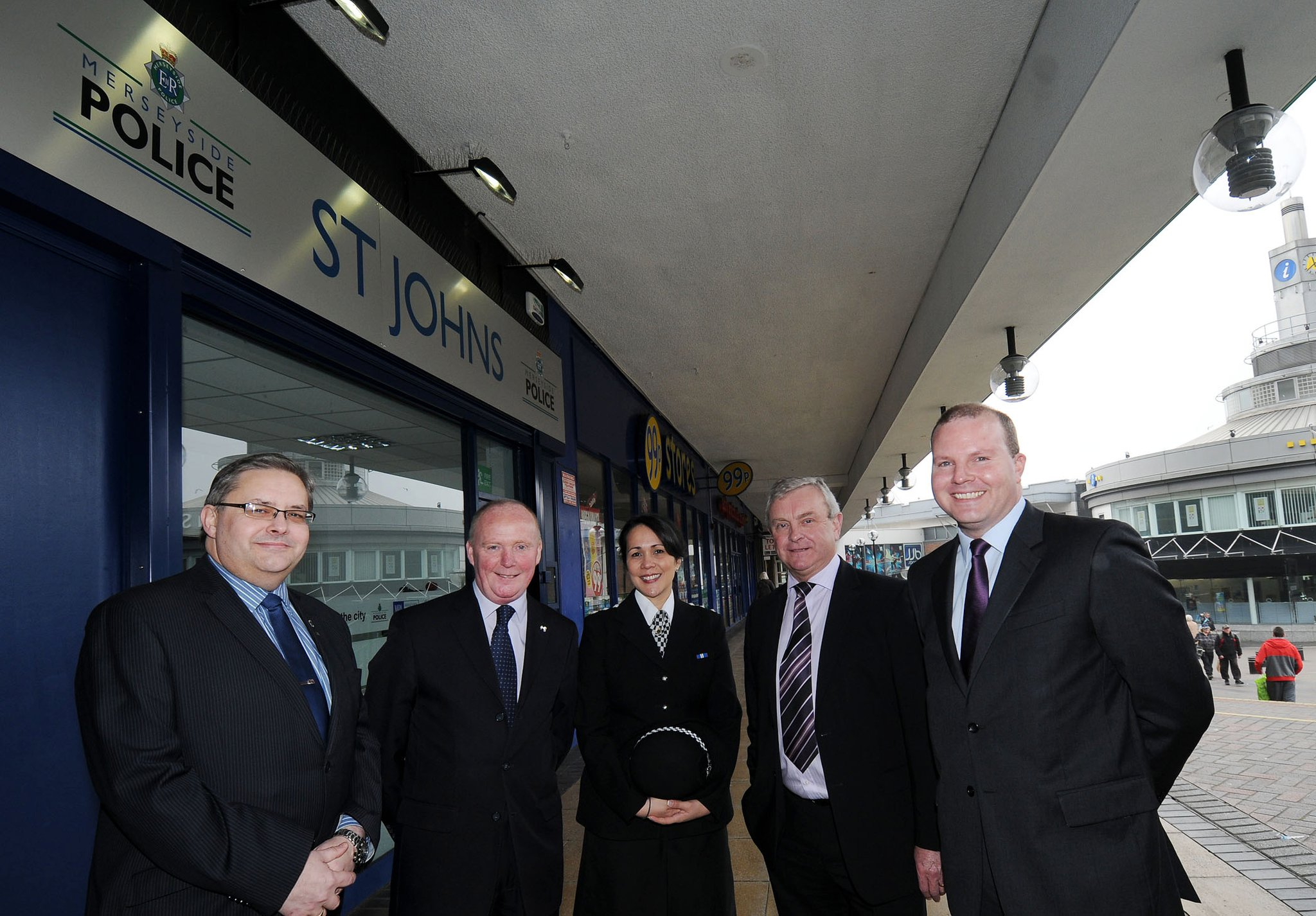
Cop Shop opening

Measures taken include:

- Co-funding of the UK's first privately paid for police station at St. Johns.
- Purple Flag status for the safety record of the city centre's night time economy.
- Radio Alert Scheme linking stores to combat shoplifting and other crimes with data and intelligence shared with the Police.
- Support of Child Safe Zone in St Johns Shopping Centre and Clayton Square.
- Dedicated enforcement patrols throughout City Central BID area seven days a week.

=== Environmental and enhanced management ===
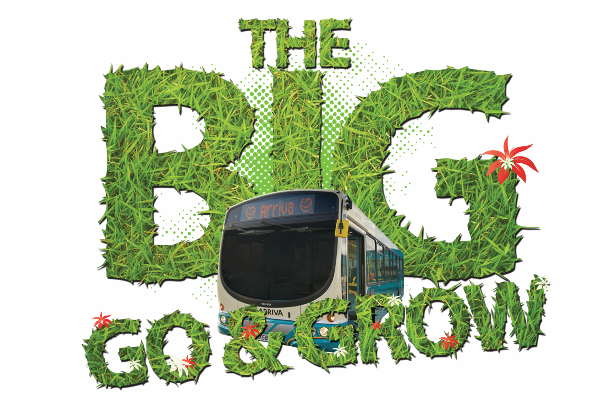
The Big Go & Grow

“Cleaner and greener" has been a key focus. City Central has worked in partnership with Liverpool City Council's Environment Team targeting trade waste, fly-tipping, aggressive begging, buskers, charity collectors and anti-social behaviour issues. Key achievements include:

- Maintenance of street furniture – including Pop Wall of Fame on Mathew Street.
- UK's first private sector ambassador of Keep Britain Tidy's Love Where you Live campaign in partnership with Liverpool Commercial District BID.
- Big Go & Grow, school eco-market, won the Green Apple Award in 2011.
- Introducing hanging baskets through the BID area.
- Additional street sweepers operating 7 days a week.

=== Events and Animation ===
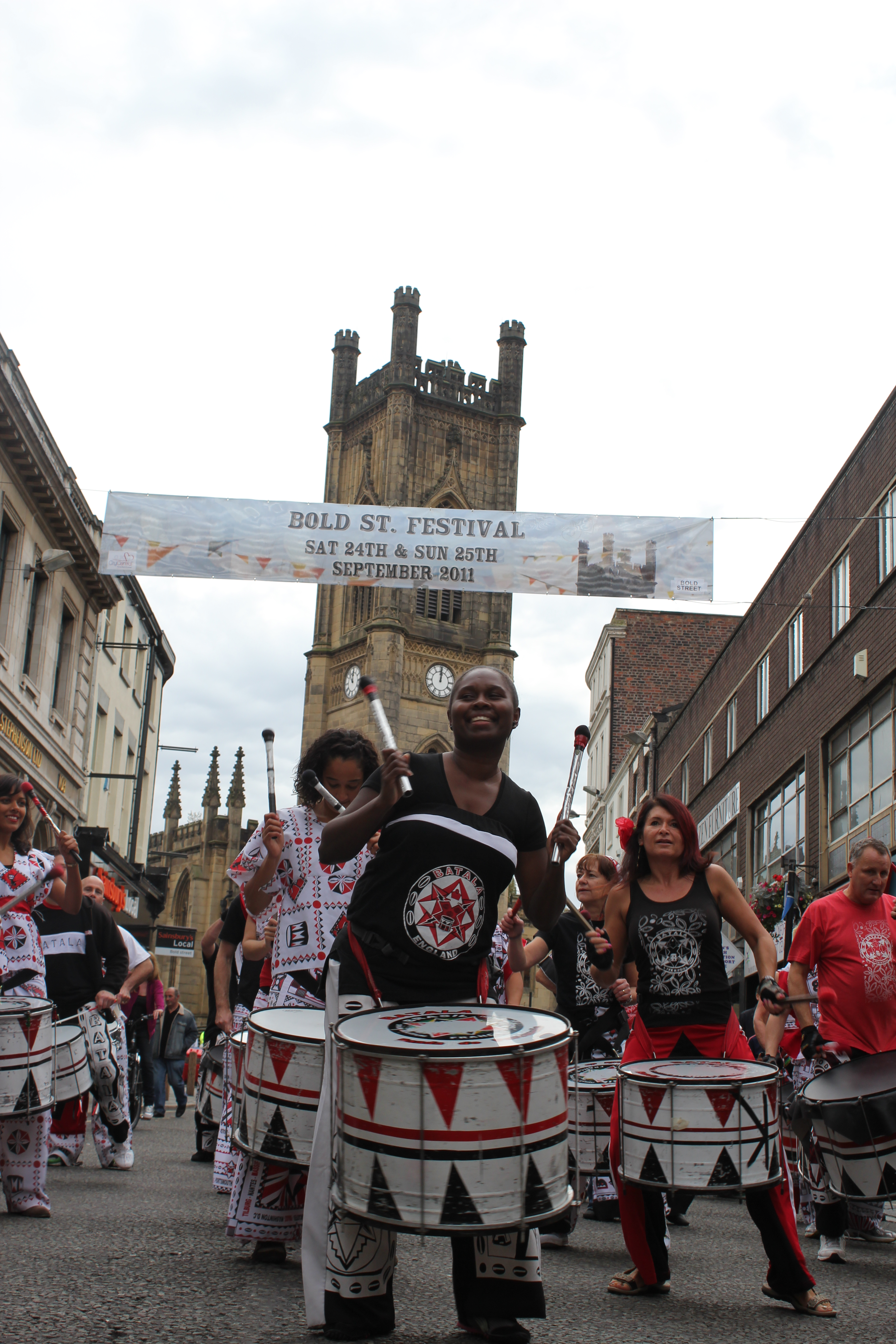
Bold Street Festival

Animating City Central is a key objective of the BID as the benefits of an events programme can be multiple: create footfall, increase dwell time, raise the profile of the city centre and raise revenue to reinvest in future events. Key achievements include:

- Liverpool city centre's first bandstand – Summer 2012.
- Liverpool first real ice-rink– Christmas 2010.
- Host different events within the BID area: Curious Garden, Liverpool Blitz 70th anniversary, Taste of Spain, Bold Street Festival, 3D Pavement Art tribute to The Beatles.
- Carnival city: Brazilica, Brouhaha, Mersey Dance Initiative.
- Commercial bookings with blue chip companies such as Adidas, BMW, Coca-Cola, Nickelodeon, Nintendo and Speedo. Hosted filming of Sainsbury's Christmas ad 2010.
- Devised UK's first on-line commercial booking system for a city centre.
- Supporter in city events such as Sea Odyssey, Mathew Street Festival, Light Night Market and many more.

=== Marketing and promotion ===
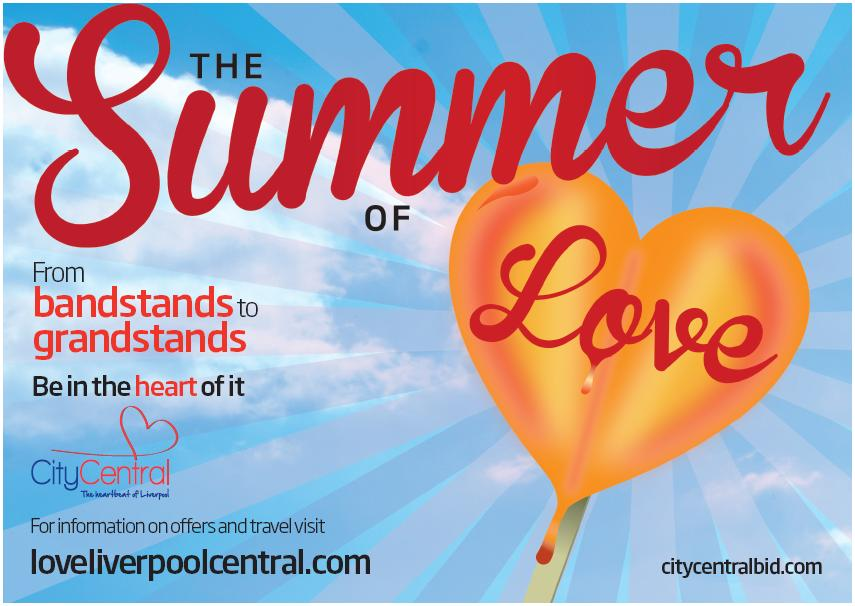
Summer of Love campaign to drive footfall during closure of Central Station

Promoting a city centre requires a multi-level communication plan which involves all the businesses. The target is to promote the unique characteristics and selling points of Liverpool. Key achievements include:

- Instigated Liverpool's first joint retail Christmas campaign with Liverpool One, Metquarter, Geraud Markets and Merseyrail.
- Devised Summer of Love campaign for April–September 2012 to drive footfall during closure of Central Station.
- Established media partnerships with Radio City, Juice FM, ONE card, Liverpool Echo, Students Survival Guide...
- Introduced "Alive after Five" campaign in 2005, establishing permanent Thursday late night shopping hours.
- Co-funded a new City Centre Retail Map.
