= Whitechapel, Liverpool =

Shopping street in Liverpool

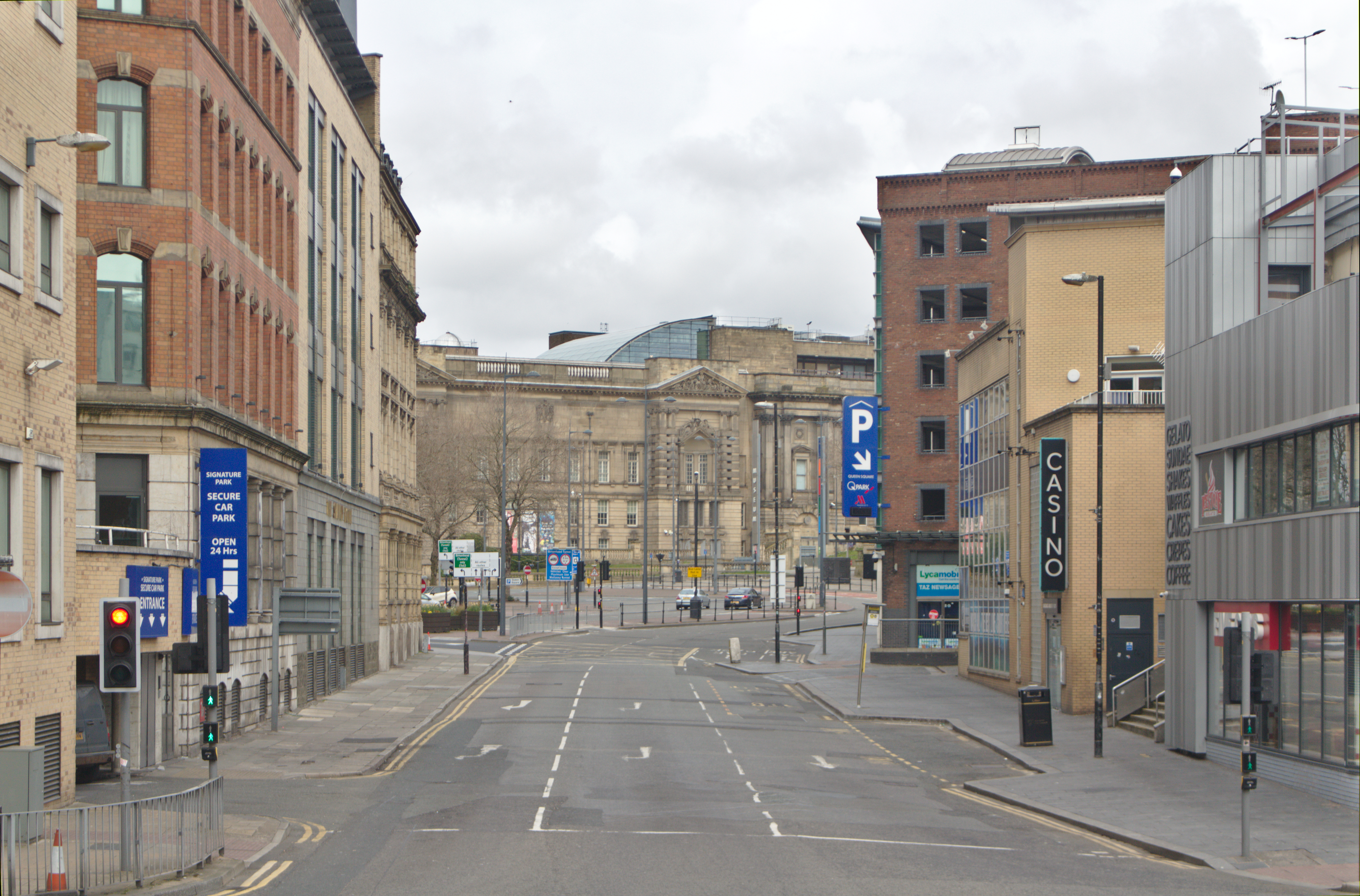
- Whitechapel as seen from Queen Square towards William Brown Street

- Location within Liverpool
- Location: Liverpool city centre
- Postal code: L2
- Coordinates: 53.407°N 2.986°W

Other
- Known for: Offices, hotels, restaurants, historic buildings

Whitechapel is a shopping street in Liverpool, Merseyside in the Central Retail Area. It lies north of Paradise Street, Church Street and Lord Street.

Shops on Whitechapel include the Metquarter shopping centre which houses many high-end boutiques.

== History ==
Whitechapel takes it name from a chapel that was situated nearby. The road is situated on what was the site of Lyver Pool, a natural creek that made up the original dock for Liverpool. The road was originally named 'Frog Lane' due to the number of frogs living in the area. By 1781, the road was referred to as 'Whitechapel' in a directory of Liverpool.

In 1643, during the English Civil War, Colonel John Moore created a garrison for Parliamentary forces which had gun batteries set up along Paradise Street and Whitechapel.

The former 'Forever 21' store was once 'North End Music Stores' (NEMS), which was managed by Beatles manager Brian Epstein.

Liverpool homeless charity, the Whitechapel Centre started off from premises on Whitechapel in 1975.
