= The Pool, Liverpool =

Former tidal creek in Liverpool, England

The Pool was a naturally occurring tidal creek of water that originally formed part of the geography of Liverpool, England. It was originally known as the Lyver Pool.

== Description ==
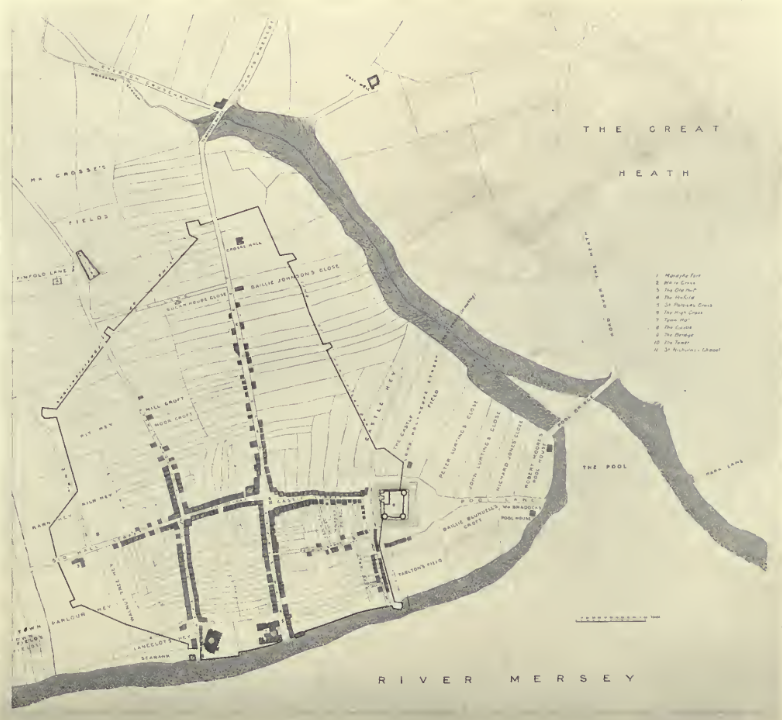
A 1668 illustration of Liverpool, showing the Pool and the town walls and castle

The pool provided a natural harbour for ships visiting the city. The huge tidal range of the River Mersey meant that there was limited time for which to load and unload ships. From the river, the Pool followed a path along what is now Paradise Street, Whitechapel, Old Haymarket and on to Lord Street and Dale Street. Whitechapel was originally known as 'Frog Lane' due to how wet the area was.

As well as receiving salt water from the rising tide, the Pool was fed freshwater by two streams. One ran from an area known as 'Moss Lake', which was a bog situated between what is now Hope Street, Crown Street and Croxteth Road. The other flowed into the Pool in the area of Lord Street. Both streams helped keep the Pool's water fresh and wash away the city's sewage.

== History ==
The name of Liverpool comes from the Pool itself. Lifer comes from Old English, meaning thick or muddy water, and pōl, meaning a pool or creek. Whilst several different variations of the name have existed over the years (such as Leuerepul, Lytherpole and Litherpoole), they all originate from the name of the Pool.

1207 saw Liverpool being granted status as a borough by King John, largely because of the harbour that the Pool provided, and its military and trade importance with Ireland. Prior to that, Liverpool had existed only as a vill of little importance. Liverpool Castle, built between 1232―1237, was positioned right next to the entrance of the pool. From the early 1400s, the Tower of Liverpool, a fortified building positioned at the bottom of Water Street, offered additional protection to the harbour.

During the 1600s, boat building took place on the Pool, around the Whitechapel area. By the 1660s, two bridges across the Pool existed. One was situated at the foot of Lord Street and offered access to the land where Church Street is today; the other was on Dale Street.

After the Civil War, Liverpool's role as a port grew and the Pool saw increasing use as the Port of Chester began to silt up. It received its first transatlantic shipment in 1648, ensuring its importance.

In the 1700s, a ferry service made use of the Pool, taking passengers from Lord Street over the River Mersey. By this time, Liverpool's growth as a port led to increased demands on the Pool and the decision was made to convert it into the world's first wet dock. The 1708 Dock Act gave power to the Common Council to construct a dock and charge for its use. The pool was closed off in 1709 and dock gates were built across the entrance of the pool and harbour walls were built directly on to the sandstone which Liverpool is situated upon. The facility (now referred to as the Old Dock) opened in 1715 and, along with further development of the docks, pushed the port of Liverpool towards being one of the most important ports in Europe.

The Pool and the Old Dock stayed in use for over a hundred years, however, as shipping and the size of ships increased, the facility ended up being too small for use. It was closed in August 1826 and filled in, bringing the end to the Pool.

== Later and present day use ==
After the Pool and dock were filled in, the land was used for commercial purposes, and was home to Liverpool's fourth Custom House between 1839–1948. Later, the area was used for office buildings and a car park. In 2004, work began on constructing a large shopping centre on the area, known as Liverpool ONE. During excavation work for the construction, parts of the dock walls for the Old Dock were exposed. It is possible to look down into the Old Dock through a special viewing port on Thomas Steers Way.
