= Paradise Street, Liverpool =

Street in Liverpool

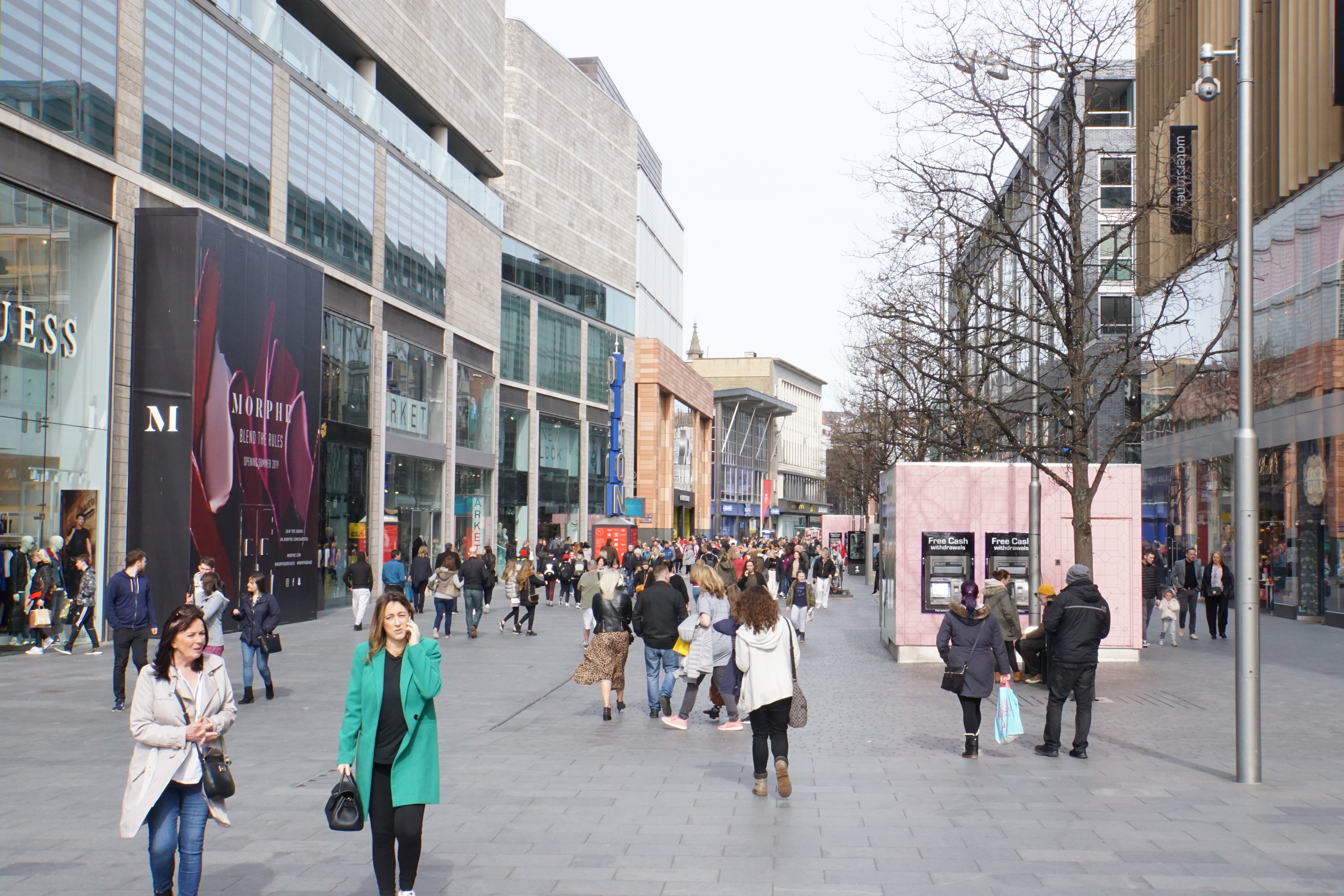
- Paradise Street, Liverpool

- Location within Liverpool
- Location: Liverpool city centre
- Postal code: L1
- Coordinates: 53.4037°N 2.9860°W

Other
- Known for: Shopping, Liverpool One

Paradise Street is a street in Liverpool, Merseyside. It lies south of Whitechapel and north of Duke Street. Part of the street forms part of the Liverpool One shopping area.

The street contains many stores and restaurants including McDonald's, Uniqlo, Urban Outfitters, Morphe, JD Sports, Footasylum, Starbucks, Hugo Boss and John Lewis.

== History ==
The road is situated on what was the site of Lyver Pool, a natural creek that made up the original dock for Liverpool. The land was originally known as 'Common Shore', and the area was a described as an 'evil-smelling swamp' and sewer by historian Thomas Troughton in his 1802 book on Liverpool's history.

In 1643, during the English Civil War, Colonel John Moore created a garrison for Parliamentary forces which had gun batteries set up along Paradise Street and Whitechapel.

A bridge across the Pool was built in 1672. The remains of the bridge, situated where the McDonald's restaurant new stands, were unearthed after World War 2 when rebuilding took place.

During the 1730s, Thomas Steers - the engineer who built Liverpool's first dock, owned land on Common Shore. He chose to name the land 'Paradise Street' after the street he once lived on in Rotherhithe, London.

A Holiday Inn was opened on the street in 1973 (later known as the 'Moat House Hotel'), which welcomed guests including Oliver Reed, Richard Harris, Julie Dench and John Travolta. The hotel closed in December 2004 and was demolished in spring 2005.

The bus station on Paradise Street was demolished in 2006 as part of the Liverpool One development. A replacement bus station was built on Canning Place, opening in June 2005.

In August 2011, the gates to the former Liverpool Sailors' Home were re-erected on the pedestrian section of the street, close to where the original site of the sailor's home was.

== In popular culture ==
Paradise Street (and Liverpool) figure in the lyrics of the sea shanty Blow the Man Down.
