= St Peter's Church, Liverpool =

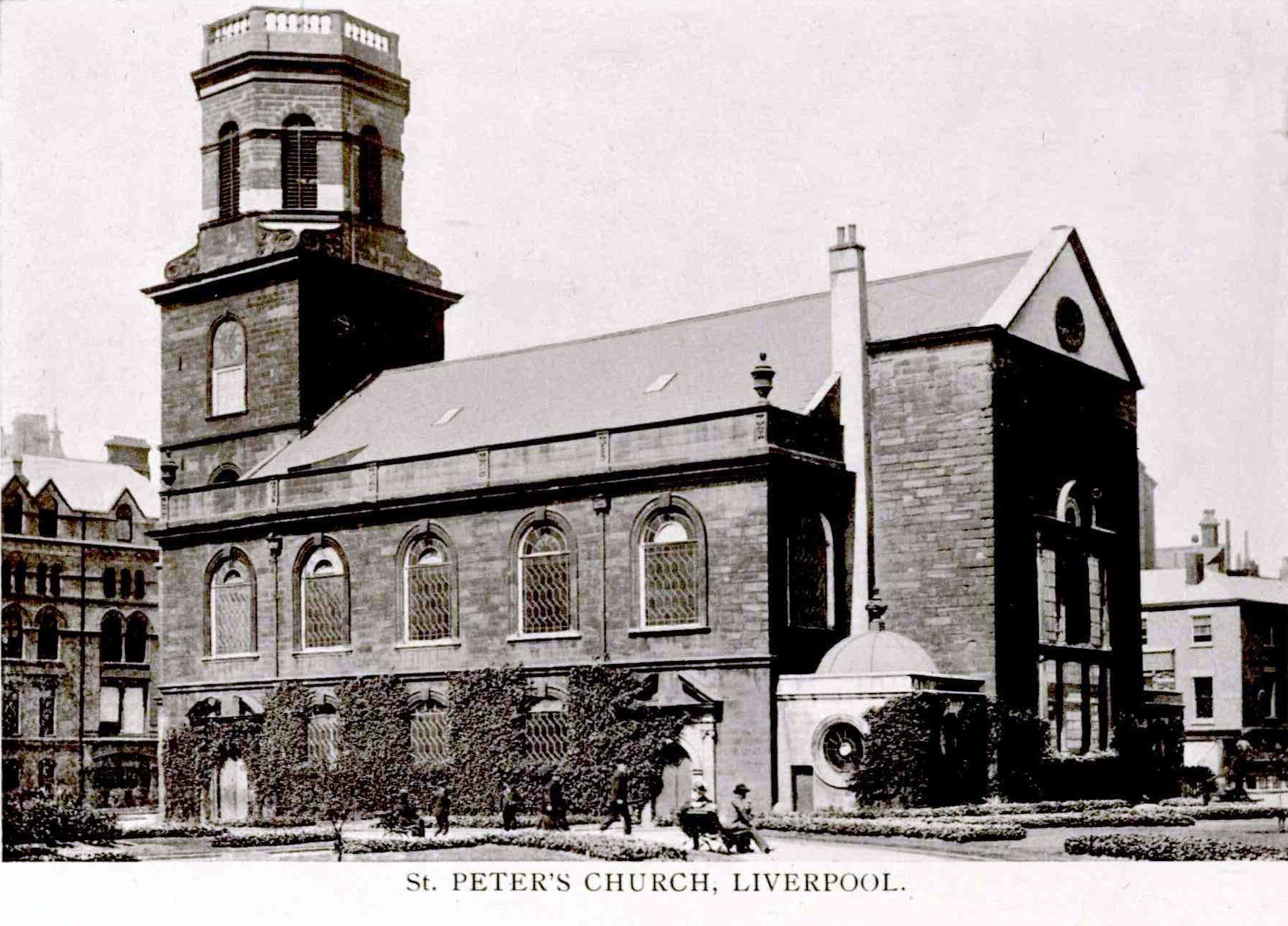
- St Peter's Church in 1922.

- Location within Liverpool.
- 53°24′18.4626″N 2°59′3.9103″W
- OS grid reference: SJ 34651 90261
- Location: Liverpool
- Country: England
- Denomination: Church of England

History
- Consecrated: 29 June 1704

Architecture
- Functional status: Demolished
- Architect: John Moffat
- Construction cost: £3,500
- Demolished: 1922

Specifications
- Height: 108 ft (33 m)

St Peter's Church was the Anglican pro-cathedral and parish church of Liverpool. It was erected in 1700, consecrated on 29 June 1704, and demolished in 1922. It was located on Church Street. Its location is now marked by a bronze Maltese cross on Church Street.

== History ==
The first oratorio to be performed in Liverpool was Handel's Messiah, which took place in St Peter's Church.

On 1 July 1880, J. C. Ryle was appointed as the first Bishop of Liverpool, at which point St Peter's became the pro-cathedral of Liverpool.

The church was later replaced as the cathedral of Liverpool by the current Liverpool Cathedral.

A small theological library was founded in the vestry of the church in 1715 for general use. An inventory of the church's goods was taken in 1893 which recorded that the library's existence was not widely known amongst Liverpool people and that there was a misconception amongst parishioners that it was for the exclusive use of the clergy. The church's records are stored in the Liverpool Records Office.

== Architecture ==
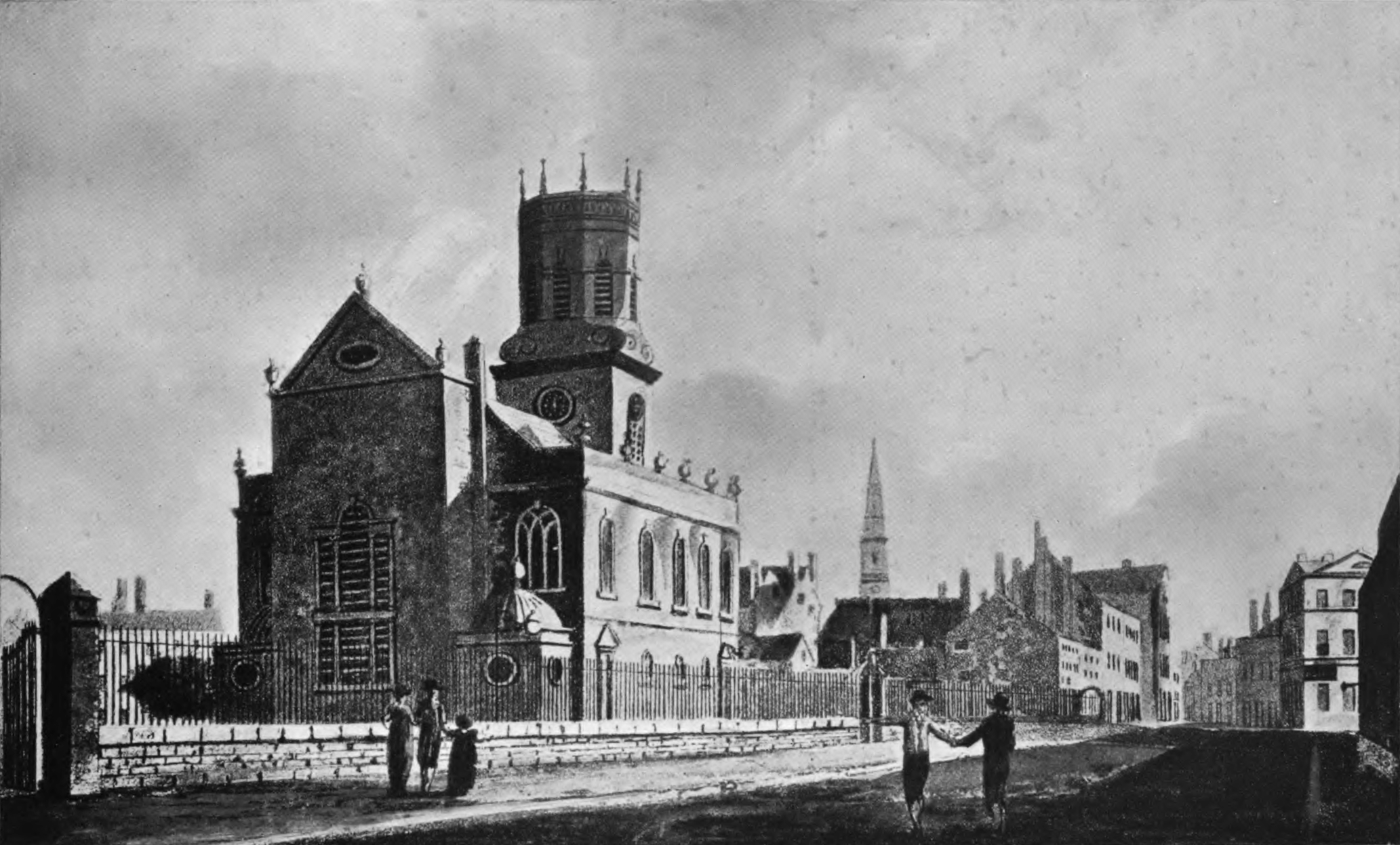
Sketch of 1800.

The building was designed by John Moffat and was erected to the south of Church Street. The architecture of the pro-cathedral was criticized for being inconsistent, as each of the doorways to the church featured different designs. The church had a single tower that measured 108 feet (33 meters) in height, with the upper part being octagonal in shape and containing a peal of ten bells.

The church contained an oak altar that was greatly admired. At the eastern end was a stained glass window representing Saint Peter, and at the western end was a large organ.

The environment surrounding the church was criticized for being muddy; Church Street was not paved until 1760 and was the site of a weekly cattle market.

== Closure and demolition ==
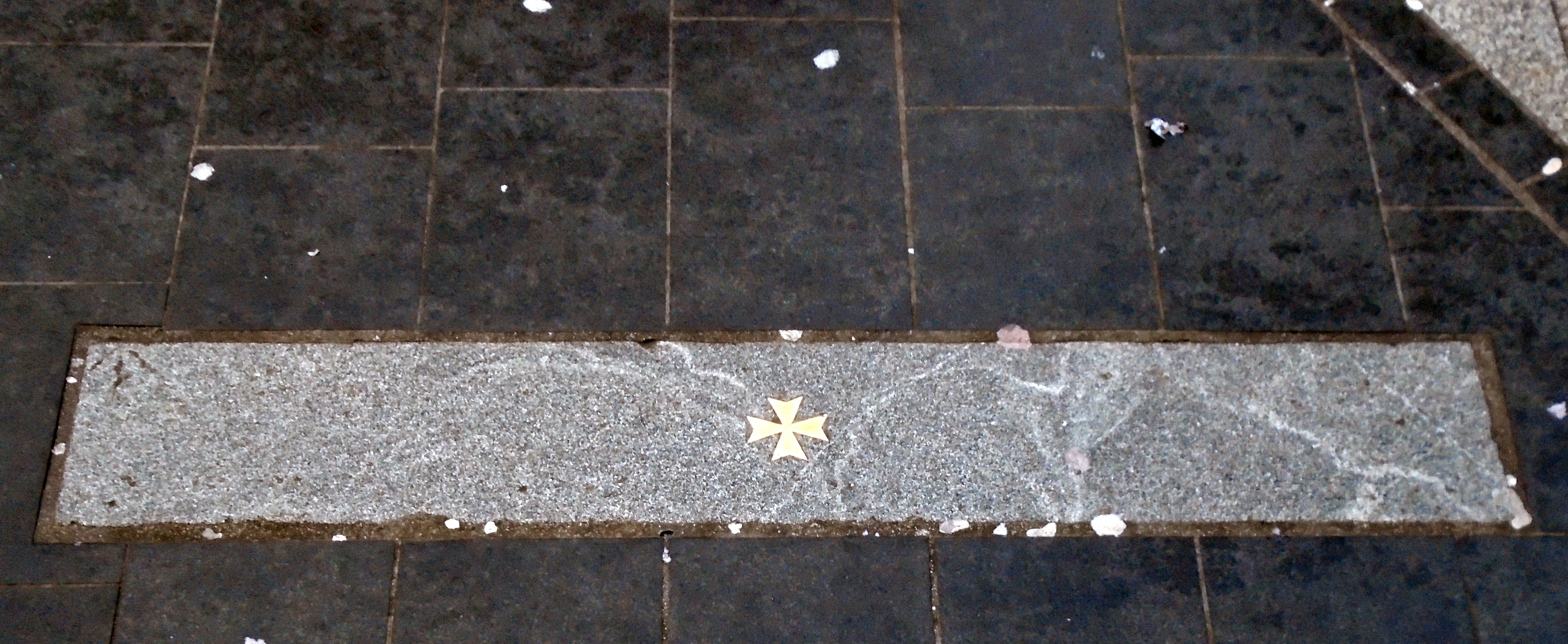
The plaque that now marks the former site of the church.

By the early 20th century, it was felt that Liverpool deserved a more significant building as its cathedral. Construction on the new Liverpool Cathedral commenced in 1904, and by 1922, St Peter's Church was deemed obsolete. The building was slated for demolition, which also allowed for the widening of Church Street. The last service took place in the church in September 1919 before demolition began, which was completed on 23 October 1922. That same year, construction of a new Woolworths store commenced, designed by William Priddle, and the store opened in August 1923.

Today, the only indications that a church once stood at the site are the name of the street and a brass Maltese cross set in the granite pavement, placed at the precise location of the doors of the former church.
