= Metquarter =

- Location: Liverpool, Merseyside, England
- Coordinates: 53°24′24.1″N 2°59′8.5″W
- Opened: 9 March 2006; 20 years ago
- Developer: Milligan, J. W. Kaempfer and Richardson Developments
- Owner: Anglo Irish Bank Private Banking and Alanis Capital
- Num. of stores: 38
- Floor area: 160,000 sq ft (15,000 m^{2})
- Floors: 2
- Website: metquarter.com

Metquarter is a shopping centre consisting primarily of boutique stores located in central Liverpool, England.

All businesses located in Metquarter are members of City Central, a Business Improvement District (BID) representing approximately 630 businesses in Liverpool city centre.

== History ==
The current Metquarter building previously served as Liverpool's General Post Office, which was reminiscent of a French chateau. The building was severely damaged in the May blitz in 1941, resulting in the demolition of the upper floors. The site was formerly owned by The Walton Group and was acquired in 2004 by Milligan (a retail development company that is also linked with Triangle Manchester the retail and leisure operations in Manchester and London Luton Airports) and J. W. Kaempfer and Richardson Developments. Over the space of two years from what was thought to cost £70 million eventually came to a total of £100 million and the former Post Office building was transformed into a 160,000 sq ft (15,000 m^{2}) leisure and retail centre. Metquarter was opened in March 2006. Following a successful 18-month launch period, Milligan sold Metquarter in August 2007 to Anglo Irish Bank Private Banking and Alanis Capital, the current owners.

In 2020 plans were submitted to Liverpool City Council to convert upper floors of the centre into teaching rooms, recording studios and common rooms for students at Liverpool Media Academy.

== Stores and services ==
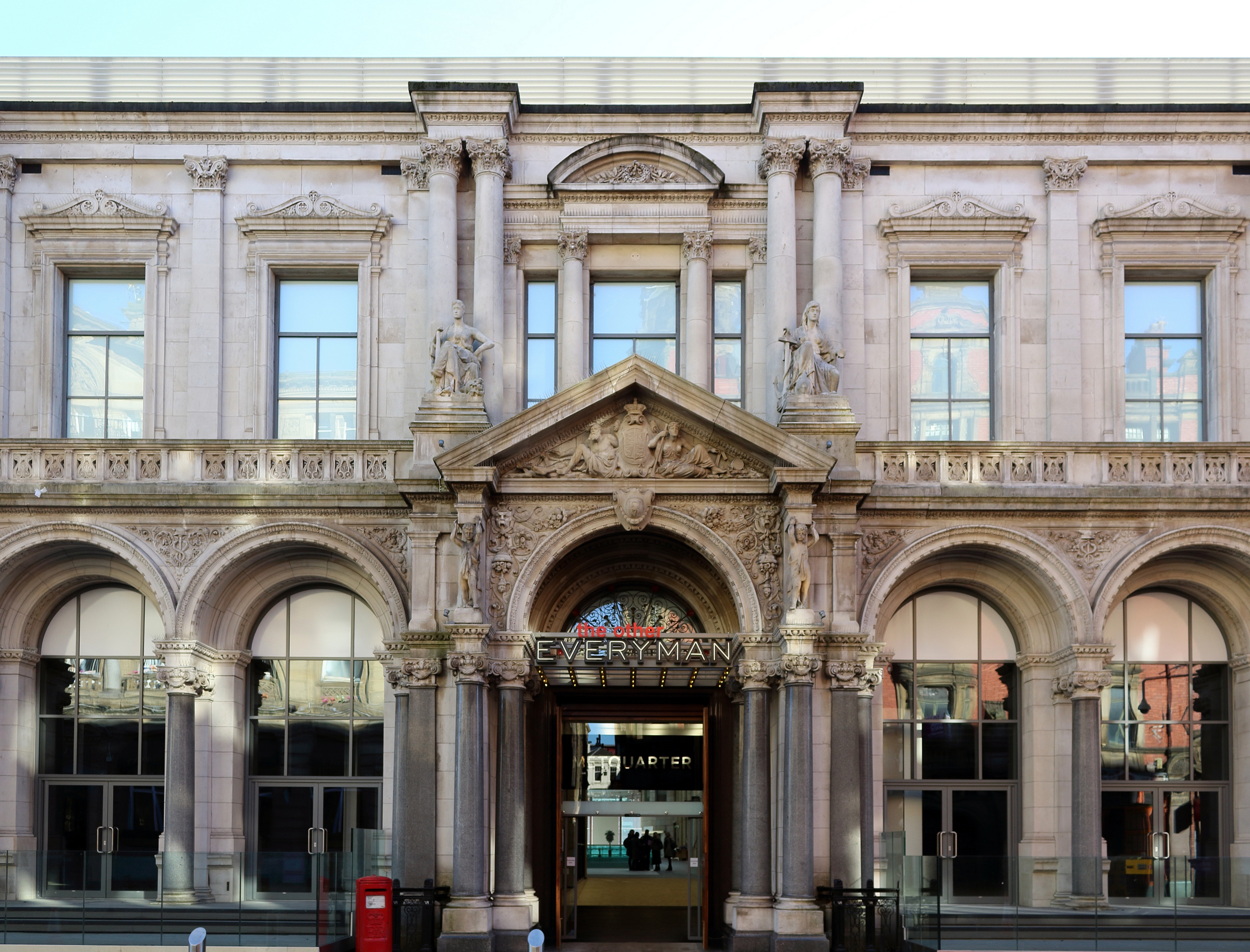
Metquarter - entrance to the former General Post Office

Metquarter is located on Whitechapel in Liverpool city centre and home to roughly 40 shops. It is the third largest shopping centre in the city, behind Liverpool One and St. John's Shopping Centre, but ahead of Cavern Walks, a boutique arcade. Metquarter has been called the 'Bond Street of Liverpool'.

Metquarter is home to stores such as Hugo Boss and Kurt Geiger, As well as the likes of Cricket and Kids Cavern, In addition to popular local brands such as Tribal Society and Transalpino. Besides retail outlets in Metquarter there is also a Food hall call GPO and an offshoot of the Everyman Theatre called Everyman Cinema.

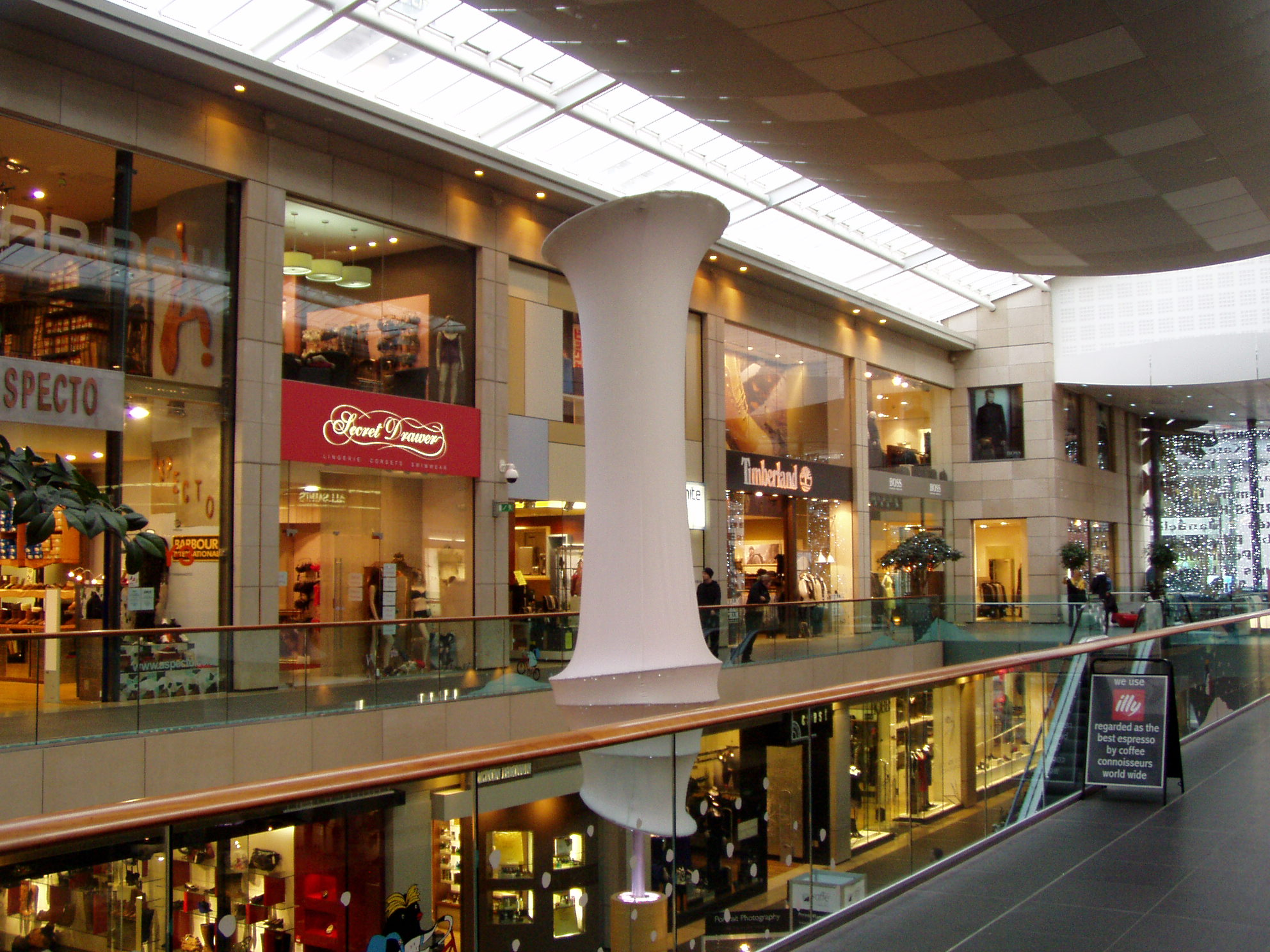
Interior of Metquarter

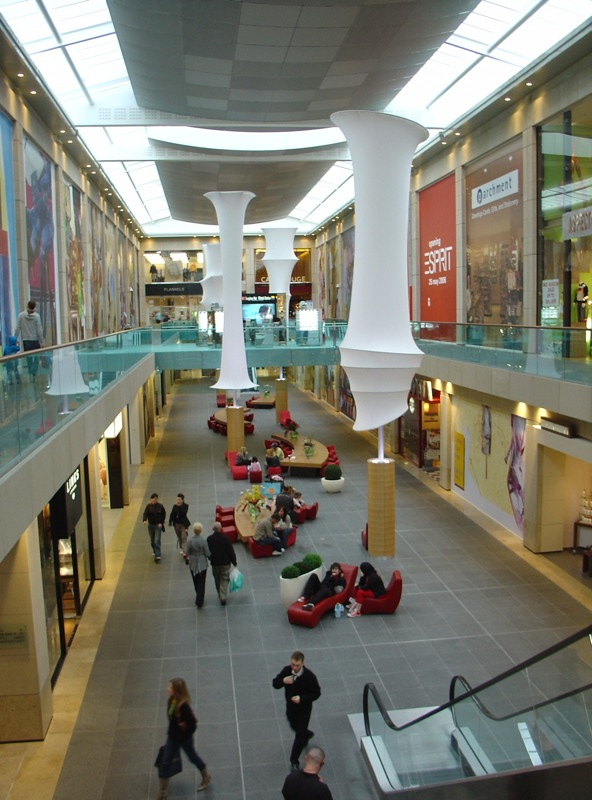
Interior of Metquarter
