= John Moore (regicide) =

Colonel John Moore (1599–1650) was one of the regicides of King Charles I.

John Moore was born into one of the oldest noble Moore families in England in 1599. He was the eldest son of Edward Moore, who was the MP for Liverpool in the first Parliament of 1625. John Moore was married to Mary Rigby, the daughter of a Royalist, in 1633. By the early 1640s, John Moore (who was by now a Member of Parliament for Liverpool) was heavily involved with the early shipping trade, forging connections in Barbados. When English Civil War broke out in England in 1642, Moore pledged his allegiance to the Roundhead Parliamentarians as did most of Liverpool's burgesses, who were largely of Puritan stock. The nobles and gentry formed the bulk of the Cavaliers (who had control of both Liverpool Castle and tower), including the mayor, John Walker. The Castle and the township was handed over to Lord Derby for the Royalists.

In May 1643, however, John Moore and his Parliamentarian men set about routing the castle, which they succeeded, suffering only 7 dead to the Royalists' 80 dead and 300 prisoners. The Lancashire Royalist faction collapsed soon after. After the castle had been taken, John Moore assumed control of both it and the area that it encompassed, taking the title of Governor of Liverpool for himself. Cromwell rewarded him with the rank of Colonel in his Parliamentarian army and also made him Parliament's vice-admiral of Cheshire and Lancashire.

Moore's victory was not to be long lived however, and Liverpool was routed from underneath him on 13 June 1644 when the Royalist Prince Rupert of the Rhine and his army of 10,000 forced an entry into the city around the area of Old Hall Street. The Parliamentarians put up a strong defence, and they took the lives of some 1,500 Royalists. By the time that Prince Rupert reached the City itself, John Moore and the remaining Parliamentary troops had already left the city via the Pool.

When Sir John Meldrum's Parliamentary forces recaptured the city six months later, John Moore found himself back in charge as governor.

Moore was a supporter of Pride's Purge and, as well as helping to organise security arrangements at King Charles's trial. He was a signatory of the King's death warrant in 1649.

In 1649, Moore fought in Ireland against James Butler, 1st Duke of Ormonde and became governor of Dublin. He died of a fever there in 1650.
