= Lord Street, Liverpool =

Street in Liverpool, England

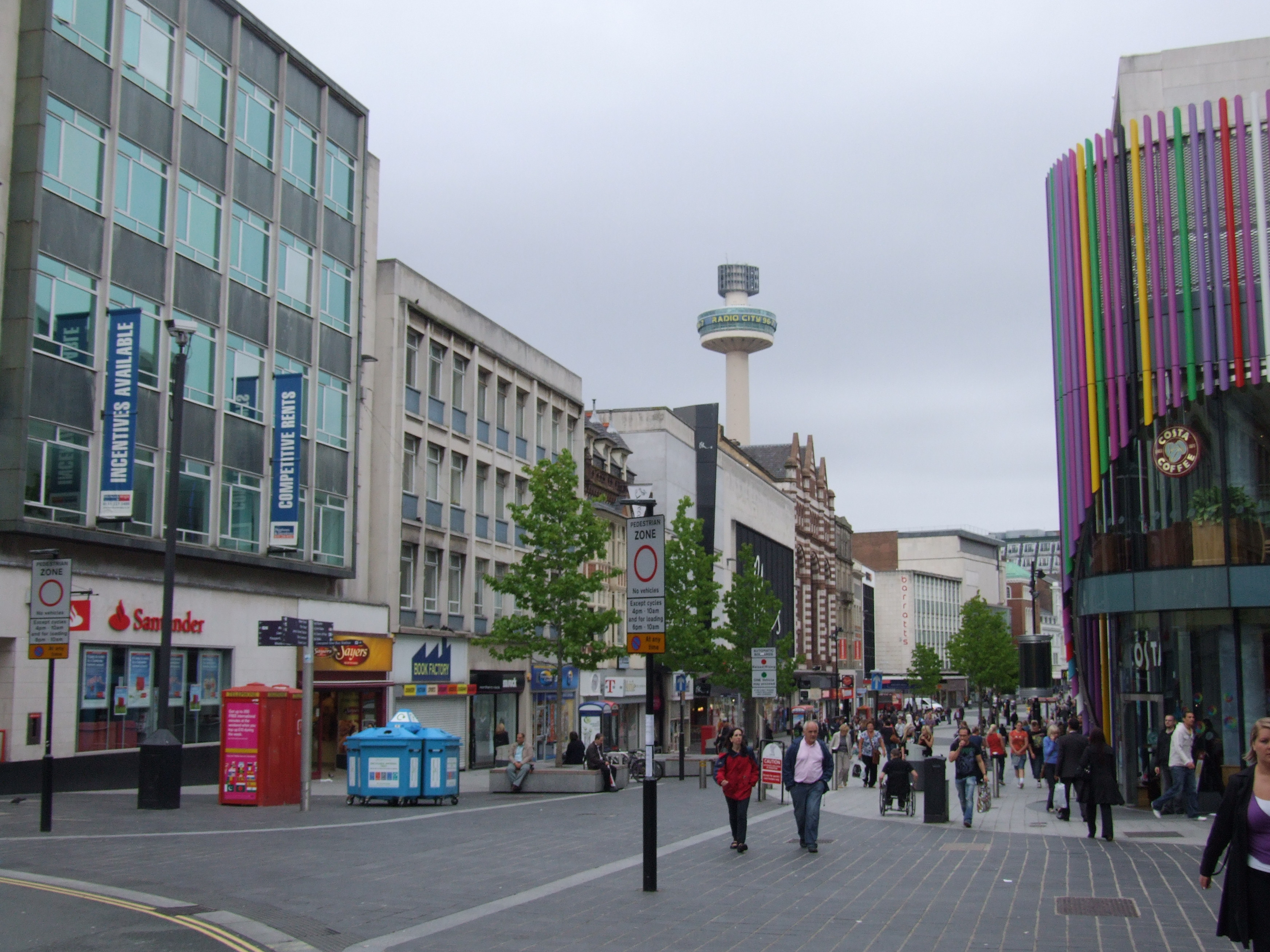
- Lord Street, Liverpool

- Location within Liverpool
- Location: Liverpool city centre
- Postal code: L2
- Coordinates: 53°24′19″N 2°59′17.6″W

Other
- Known for: Shopping, restaurants, coffee shops

Lord Street is a street in central Liverpool, England that forms part of the city's main shopping district. The street is less than 300 metres in length. It joins Church Street to the east and James Street alongside Derby Square and the Queen Elizabeth II Law Courts to the west. The majority of land to the south of Lord Street is occupied by the Liverpool One complex, whilst the likes of Cavern Walks are located on the north side of the street.

== History ==
The street was originally cut through the Castle orchard by Lord Molyneux's in 1668. This was opposed by Liverpool Corporation and legal action ensued. Once resolved, the street was known as 'Lord's Lane' and later as 'Molyneux's Lane' before taking its current name.

The street was once cut off from Church Street by the Lyver Pool, a natural creek that made up the original dock for Liverpool. Church Street was cut off from Lord Street up until 1709 when the pool was closed up. Up until then, the street could only be accessed from Lord Street via a bridge.

The last part of Liverpool Castle stood on Lord Street until its demolition in 1725. In the last quarter of the eighteenth century, the street became known as Lord Molyneux Street and is described as "ill-built and very narrow" with "several good houses, inhabited by respectable families, some tolerably good shops, and several taverns". Lord Molyneux's family had a house on the north side of the street, and in the 1780s it was home to abolitionist, historian and botanist, William Roscoe.

At this time, the street was a loading point for wagons to Ormskirk and all parts of The Fylde. Bates' Hotel was in existence by 1785 and a large room therein was used as a news-room for the reading of newspapers, prior to the opening of the Athenaeum News-Room and Library in 1798. In 1851 while excavating for the gas company, workmen unearthed a stone arch and part of the abutment of a bridge on the corner of Lord Street and Whitechapel. The discovery confirmed an 18th century sighting at the time the foundations of the Bates' Hotel building were laid. In 1799, residents and shopkeepers began laying flagstones along each side of the street for pavements; the middle of the street was laid with large, rough paving-stones — macadamization of the road surface came much later.

Gas lighting was installed on the street in 1824 and the following year Liverpool Corporation successfully applied for an Act to open and widen some of the streets in Liverpool, including Lord Street. This involved removing many old and dilapidated buildings.

One of the early BBC radio relay stations, 6LV, broadcast from a studio above a cafe in Lord Street from 1924 to 1931. The building housing the studio suffered bomb damage in World War II. After destruction by German aerial bombing much of Lord Street was rebuilt in the 1950s; the south side "drearily rebuilt" according to the Buildings of England series covering Liverpool.

== Notable buildings ==
81–89 Lord Street is a Grade II listed office building from 1901, designed by architect Walter Aubrey Thomas. It is of four storeys with attics and constructed of horizontal layers of orange and white stone. The listing comment says "the design recalls Siena Cathedral". Originally running through the centre of the building was a galleried shopping arcade under a glazed, domed roof. In 1935 the ground floor was redesigned for department store retailer British Home Stores.
