= Church Street, Liverpool =

Street in Liverpool, England

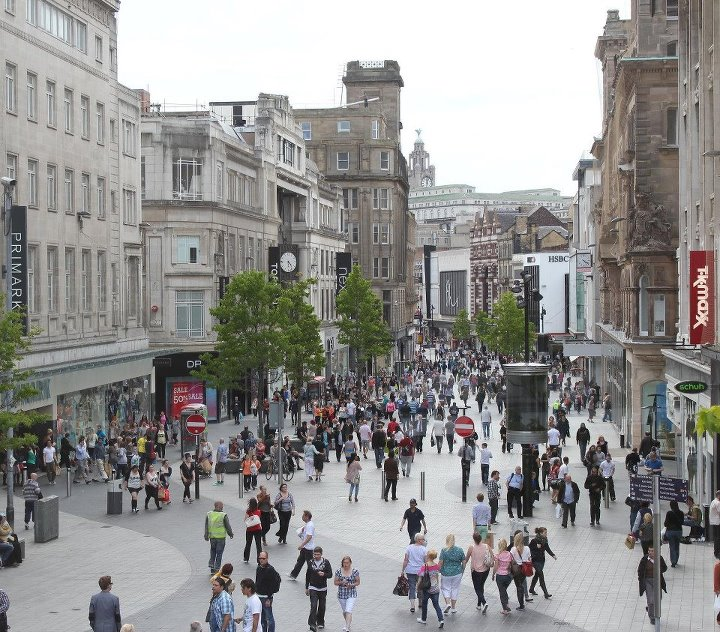
- Church Street meets Lord Street

- Location within Liverpool
- Location: Liverpool city centre
- Postal code: L1
- Coordinates: 53.4052°N 2.9836°W

Other
- Known for: Shopping

Church Street is a street in Liverpool, England, lying between Bold Street to the east and Lord Street to the west. It is the main shopping area of Liverpool and takes its name from a church formerly situated on the road. The area behind the shops on the south side of Church Street is now part of the Liverpool One shopping complex, which opened in October 2008 after the redevelopment of a large part of the L1 postcode area (hence the name).

== Notable buildings ==
The side streets to the north of Church Street lead to Williamson Square, while the Grade I listed Bluecoat Chambers—the oldest surviving building in Liverpool—is to the south along Church Alley. The Liverpool Athenaeum, an institution founded in the 18th century, is also on Church Alley. The street was once home to St Peter's Church, which was erected in 1700 and demolished in 1922. The Anglican Church then sold the land to Liverpool Corporation in order to fund the building of Liverpool Cathedral. One of the former entrances to the church is commemorated by a brass cross embedded in the pavement outside Keys Court, which is made with metal melted-down from the church's altar rails.

== History ==
The street was once cut off from Lord Street by the Pool, a natural creek of salt water which the city took its name from. Church Street was cut off from Lord Street up until 1709 when the pool was closed up. Up until then, the street could only be accessed from Lord Street via a bridge.

Despite its muddy state, the street had no paving until 1760 and was not flagged until 1816. Gas street lighting was installed in 1824.
