= St Johns Shopping Centre, Liverpool =

St Johns Shopping Centre

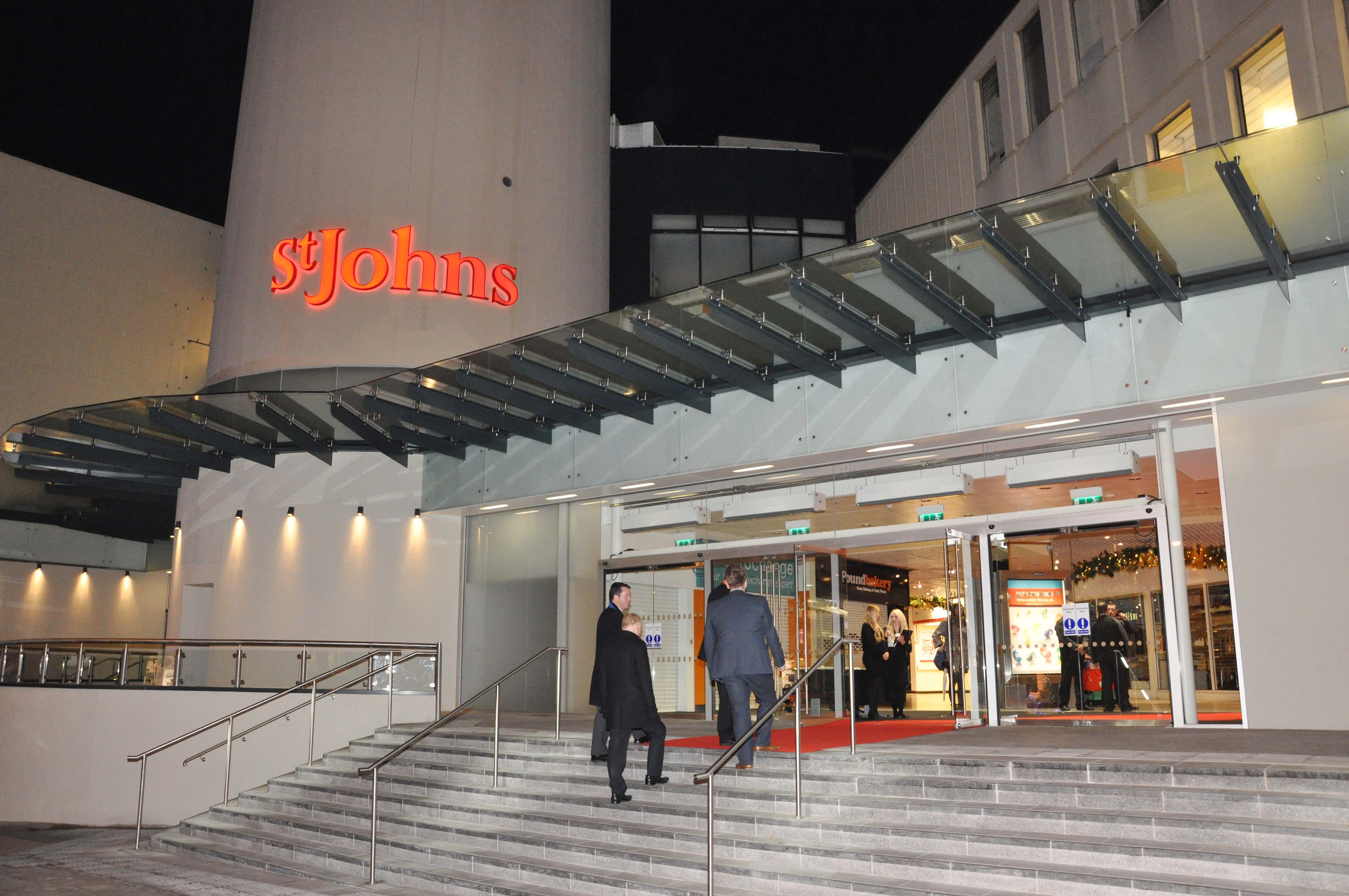
- Houghton Street entrance
- Location: Liverpool, England
- Coordinates: 53.407°N 2.981°W
- Address: St George's Place, Liverpool L1 1LY
- Opened: 1969; 57 years ago
- Manager: Neil Ashcroft
- Owner: AnaCap (Owner); RivingtonHark (Asset Management)
- Architect: James A. Roberts
- Num. of stores: 105
- Floor area: 360,002 sq ft (33,445.3 m^{2})
- Floors: 4
- Parking: 621
- Public transit: Liverpool Lime Street
- Website: stjohns-shopping.co.uk

St Johns Shopping Centre is the largest covered shopping centre in the city of Liverpool, located in the heart of the city since 1969 and home to more than 100 retailers. All businesses located in St Johns Liverpool are members of Retail & Leisure BID, a Business Improvement District (BID) representing approximately 630 businesses in the retail and leisure heart of Liverpool city centre.

== History ==
One of the first fully enclosed, roofed market halls, St. John's Market opened to the public in 1822. It was the largest in the nineteenth century. It was designed by John Foster, Junior with "136 stone-trimmed classical arched window bays, supported by 116 interior cast-iron pillars". In 1964 it was demolished. The refurbished market was re-opened to the public by Queen Elizabeth II in April 1971.

=== Shopping Centre ===
St Johns Shopping Centre, which was designed by architect James A. (Jim) Roberts, opened in 1969.

A subway with direct access to Lime Street station was open before being boarded up some years later. There were two major fires in the centre, on 26 September 1977 and 17/18 December 1979.

Considerations were made by Liverpool City Council in relation to a possible relocation of the shopping market as part of a larger redevelopment proposal for the centre. Land Securities, the then owner of the shopping centre, was aiming to start the refurbishment in early 2009 with the market moving in 2010 if the proposals went ahead.

In March 2013, St Johns Shopping Centre was acquired by InfraRed Capital Partners for £76.5 million and has since been acquired by Anacap Financial Partners which purchased the asset in September 2021.

Work started in July 2013 to completely refurbish and renovate the food court. The £1.6 million refurbishment, which was carried out by Graham Interior Fitout, dramatically modernised the lower-ground area as well as the atria around the escalators and the first floor balustrading. Work took until November 2013 to complete.

In June 2016, St Johns Market closed for a £2 million refurbishment. Following the completion of the refurbishment, the market is now spread over two floors around a central atrium with a number of enhancements, such as the installation of WiFi and new public toilets. The refurbishment has also seen an increase in the number of stalls in the market from 90 to approximately 120. The market reopened after the completion of the refurbishment on 25 November 2016. In March 2024, the market was closed by the council due to over £1.7m of unpaid rent and service charges.

In October 2026 it was announced that the former market area will be used to house The Beatles Story which will move there from Royal Albert Dock, Liverpool.

== St Johns Beacon ==
St Johns Beacon, commonly known as the Radio City Tower, is a former radio and current observation tower located on separate foundations from the shopping centre and constructed with the centre as a ventilation shaft for the heating system. Between 1971 and 1983 the beacon housed a revolving restaurant which Queen Elizabeth II opened in 1971. Between 2000 and 2024 it housed the studios and offices for Hits Radio Liverpool and Greatest Hits Radio.

== Stores ==
Retail tenants at St Johns include Aldi, Argos, Home Bargains, Iceland, Matalan, Sainsbury's

Food and drink outlets at St Johns include KFC, McDonald's and Subway. There is also a branch of Wetherspoons, The Fall Well, which was previously a pet shop.

St Johns is also home to one of Liverpool's largest group of independent retailers, ranging from baby clothing to beauty outlets, including stores such as Storm and Frocks and Fifty1.
