= Liverpool One =

Shopping, residential and leisure complex in Liverpool, England

Liverpool ONE

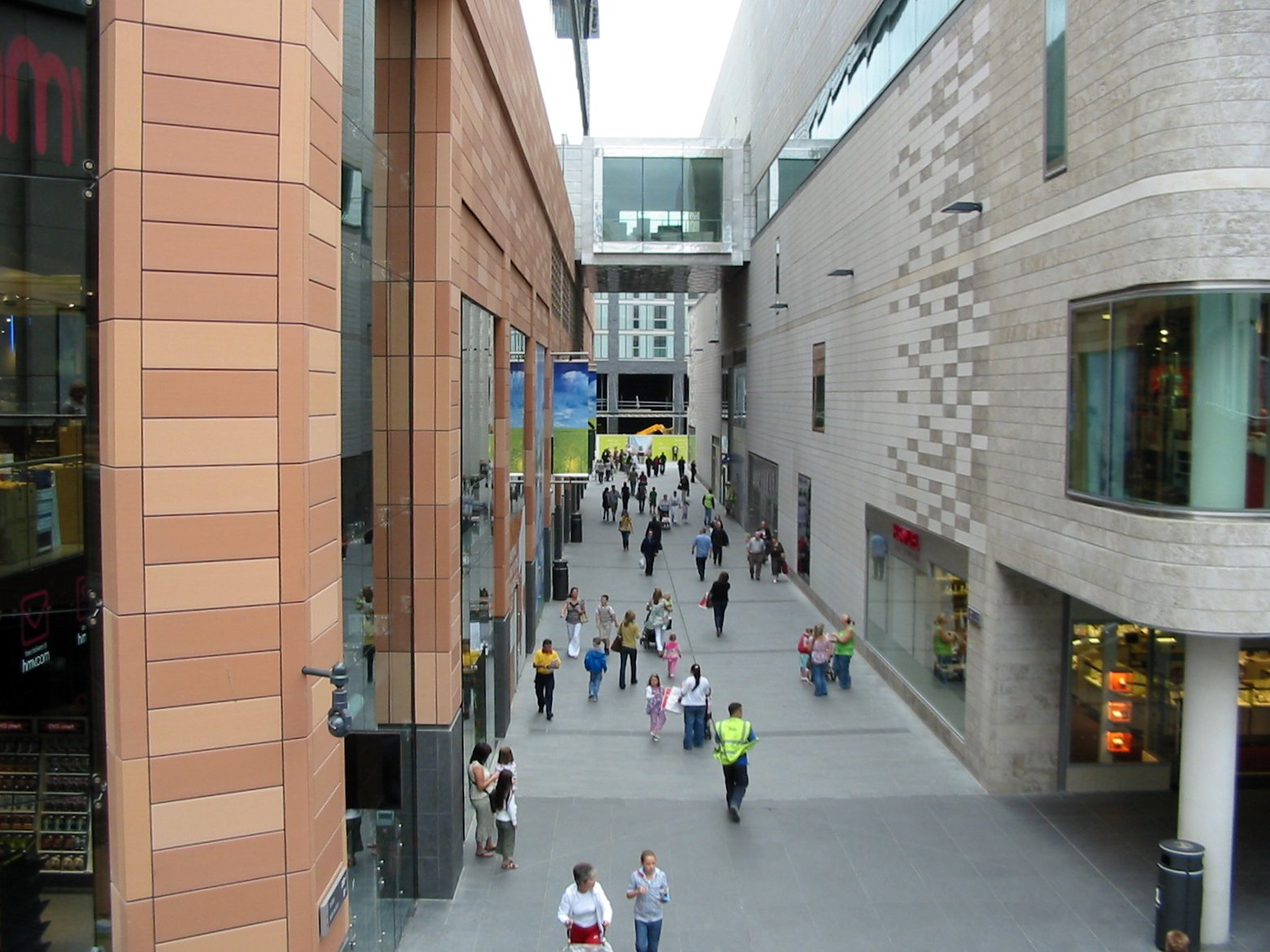
- Wall Street, Liverpool ONE
- Location: Liverpool, England
- Coordinates: 53.403°N 2.985°W
- Opened: 29 May 2008; 18 years ago
- Developer: Grosvenor Group
- Owner: Landsec
- Num. of stores: 175
- Num. of anchor tenants: 2 (John Lewis & Marks & Spencer)
- Floor area: Total area: 234,000 m^{2} (2,520,000 sq ft); Retail space: 154,000 m^{2} (1,660,000 sq ft)
- Parking: 3,000
- Website: liverpool-one.com

Liverpool ONE is a shopping, residential, and leisure complex in Liverpool, England. The project involved the redevelopment of 42 acres (170,000 m^{2}) of land in the city centre. It is a retail-led development anchored by John Lewis & Partners and Marks & Spencer. Debenhams had previously been an anchor tenant until the closure of its Liverpool ONE store in March 2021, with Marks & Spencer taking its place in mid-2023. Additional elements include leisure facilities (such as a 14-screen Odeon cinema, Gravity MAX and 36-hole mini golf centre), an urban park, Chavasse Park, apartments, offices, public open spaces, restaurants, and transport improvements. The completion of Liverpool ONE significantly boosted the local economy, while lifting Liverpool into the top five most popular retail destinations in the UK.

Liverpool ONE is the largest open-air shopping centre in the UK and the tenth-largest shopping centre overall. Each area was created by a different architect, leading to stark differences between some buildings, one way in which Liverpool ONE differentiates itself from other shopping centres. The majority of the development was opened in phases on 29 May 2008 and 1 October 2008, during Liverpool's year as the European Capital of Culture, whilst the final residential units opened in early 2009. The cost of construction associated with the project was £500 million, with a total investment value of £920 million.

In December 2024, Landsec brought the centre from Grosvenor Group.

== Construction ==
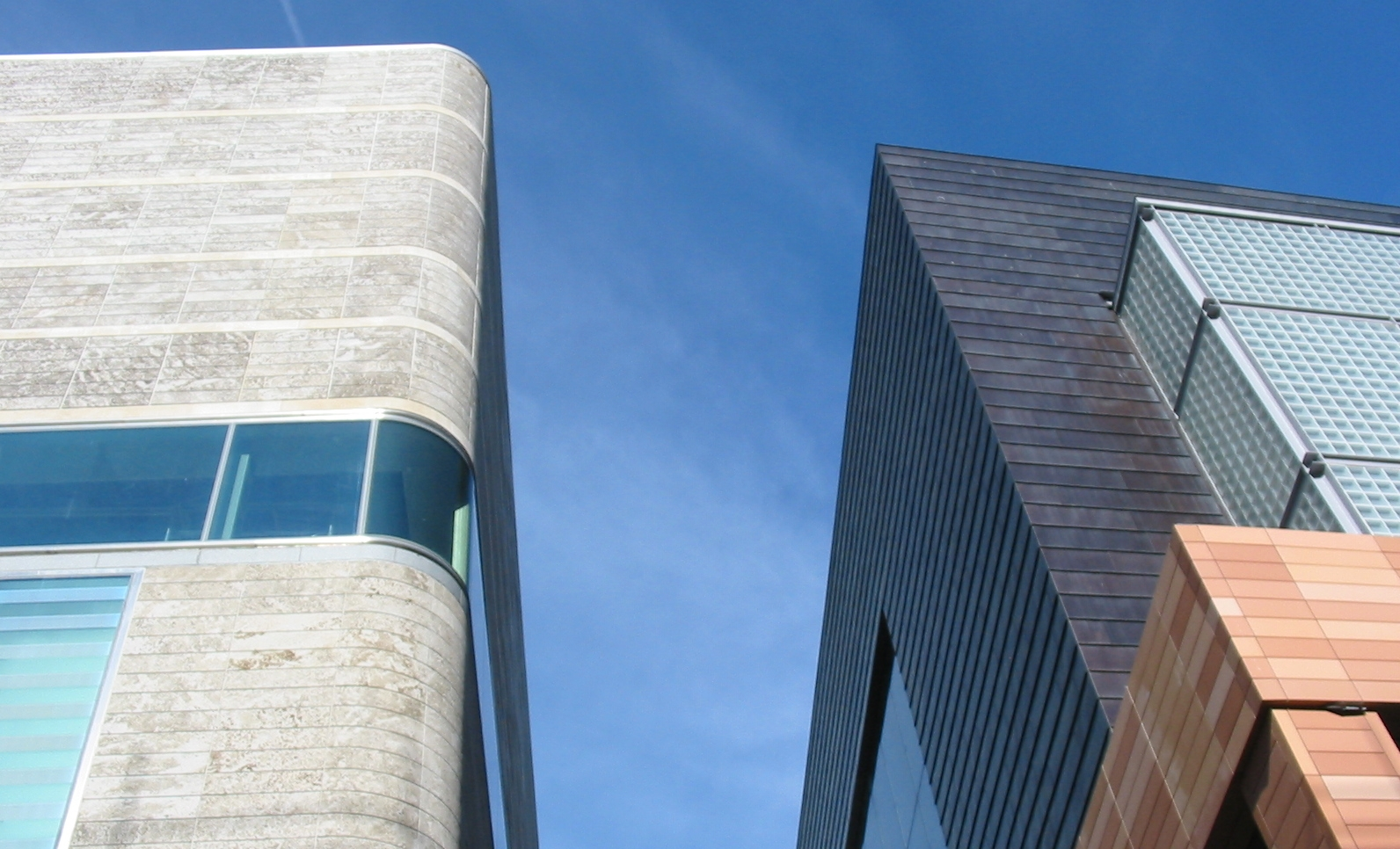
Materials vary greatly throughout Liverpool ONE

Work began in spring 2004 with the excavation of Chavasse Park, and construction began in Autumn the same year. Early works incorporated archaeological investigations, as Chavasse Park covered the ruins of buildings destroyed in World War II bombing, and the Canning Place car park was on the site of the Old Dock, the world's first wet dock.

The first parts of the development to be completed were the multi-storey car park on Liver Street, and the bus station on Canning Place.

Both opened in November 2005, allowing the old bus station and car park on Paradise Street to be demolished in January 2006.

This cleared the way for construction of the new buildings on the west side of Paradise Street, as the Moat House Hotel had already been demolished in May 2005.

In July 2006, Herbert's Hairdressers became the first business to move into new premises in the development, in his uniquely styled "Bling Bling Building" on Hanover Street. At the same time, BBC Radio Merseyside moved into new premises also on Hanover Street, allowing the demolition of the remaining buildings on Paradise Street. In August 2006, the traditional Topping out ceremony was held on what would become the top floor of the John Lewis store on the corner of Paradise Street and Canning Place.

In March 2007, following the completion of the main underground car park, works on re-instating Chavasse Park started, using polystyrene blocks to build up the height of the park.

== Stores and services ==
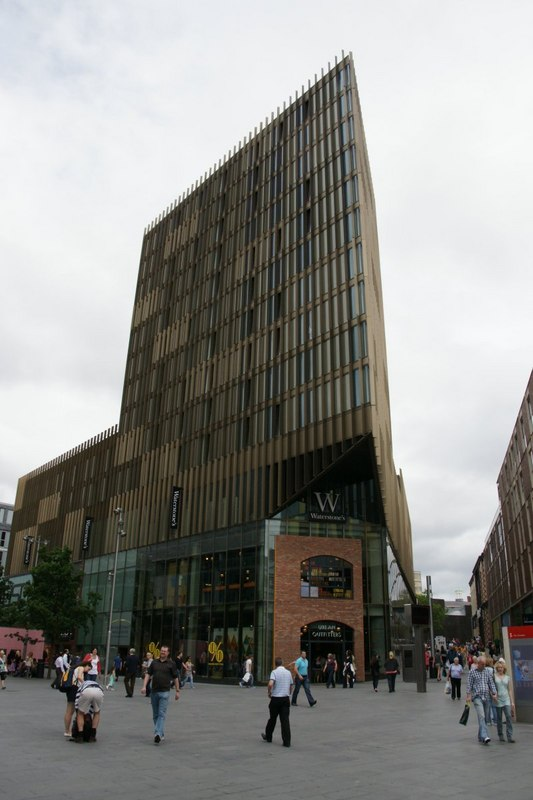
BridgeStreet Apartments

With around 170 stores and services, Liverpool ONE is the largest shopping centre in the city, the second largest in North West England (after the Trafford Centre) and the fifth largest in the United Kingdom.

=== Cinema ===
The Odeon Liverpool ONE cinema was opened on 1 October 2008, following its relocation from London Road. The new cinema is located within the shopping complex on South John Street and with over 3,000 seats and 14 screening rooms, and when opened it was the biggest cinema in Liverpool.

=== Hotels ===
Liverpool ONE is home to two large hotels. The Hilton Liverpool is located at Thomas Steers Way. The 12-storey 209-room Novotel on Hanover Street was opened in 2009.

== Districts ==
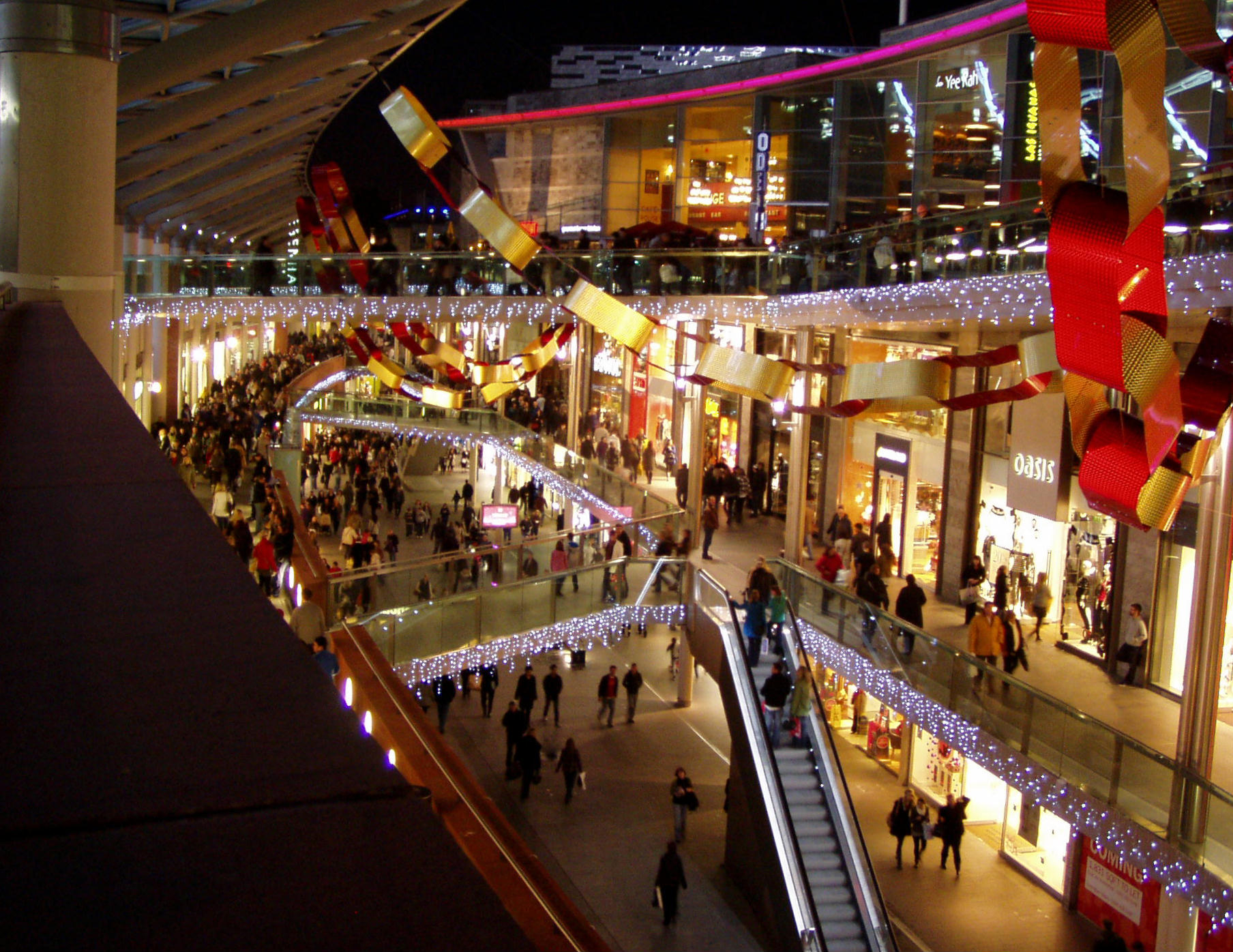
South John Street during Christmas 2009

On 1 November 2005, Grosvenor unveiled Liverpool ONE as the new brand for the regeneration. Liverpool ONE consists of six distinct districts, mixing retail, leisure and accommodation.

=== Hanover Street ===
An informal district, re-using old buildings, some formerly derelict, for homeware shops, restaurants, deli and sports bars including Lunya, Bem Brazil, Salon by Madre and Maggie Fu.

=== Peter's Lane ===
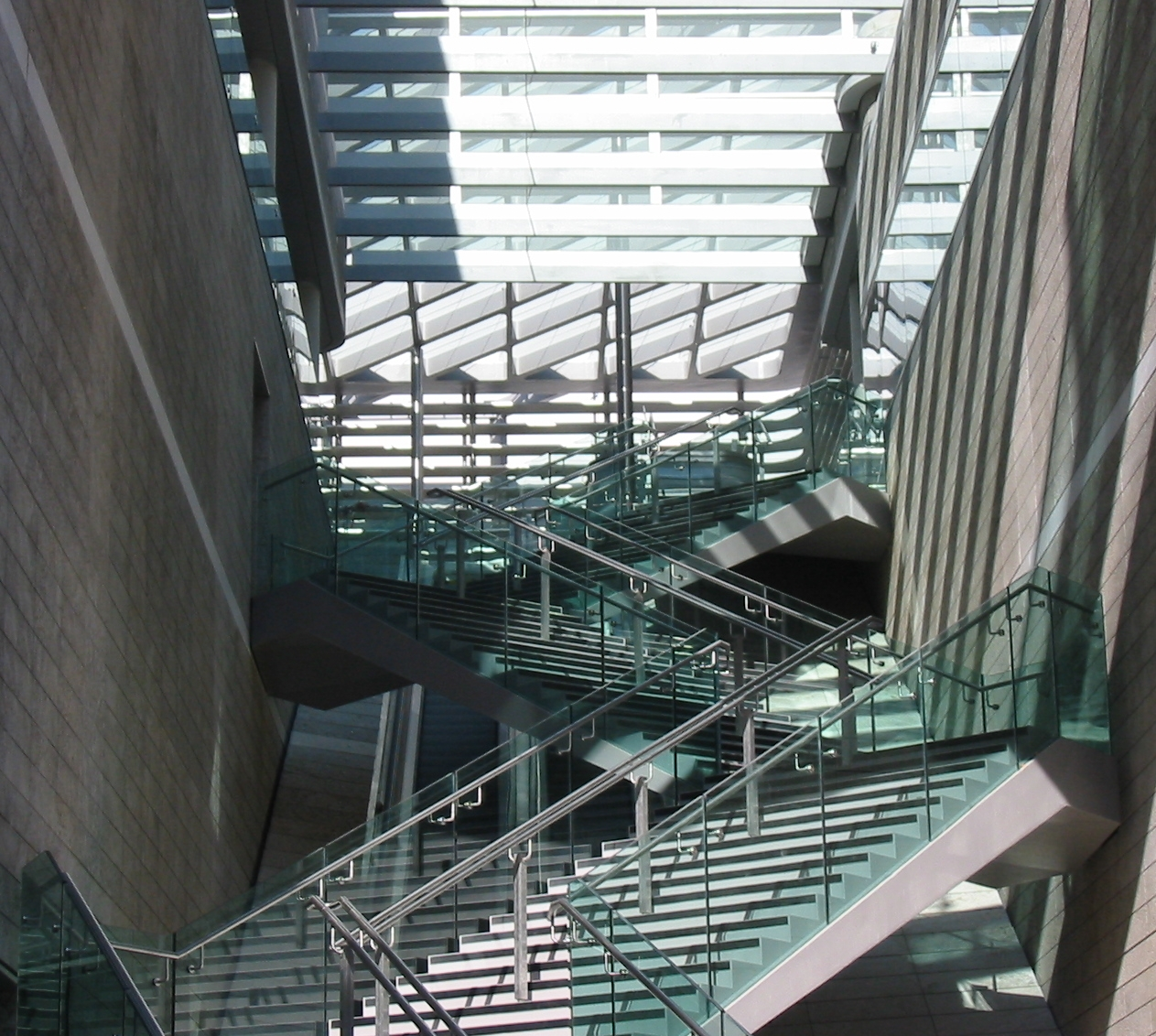
Staircase leading to Junkyard Golf and the Odeon cinema

Fashion retailers on arcades, streets and squares. Linking the existing Church Street area to the new district. Shops on Peter's Lane include; Reiss, Jo Malone London, Swarovski, The White Company, Cafe Nero and Sweaty Betty. The entrance to the new district is behind Paradise Street near to Starbucks, John Lewis and the entrance of Waterstones. A separate arcade called "Keys Court" links this area of the development to the traditional shopping heart of Liverpool, Church Street. Keys Court used to be the home of Topshop (the largest outside London), and currently houses the likes of Molton Brown and Kiehls.

=== New Manesty's Lane ===
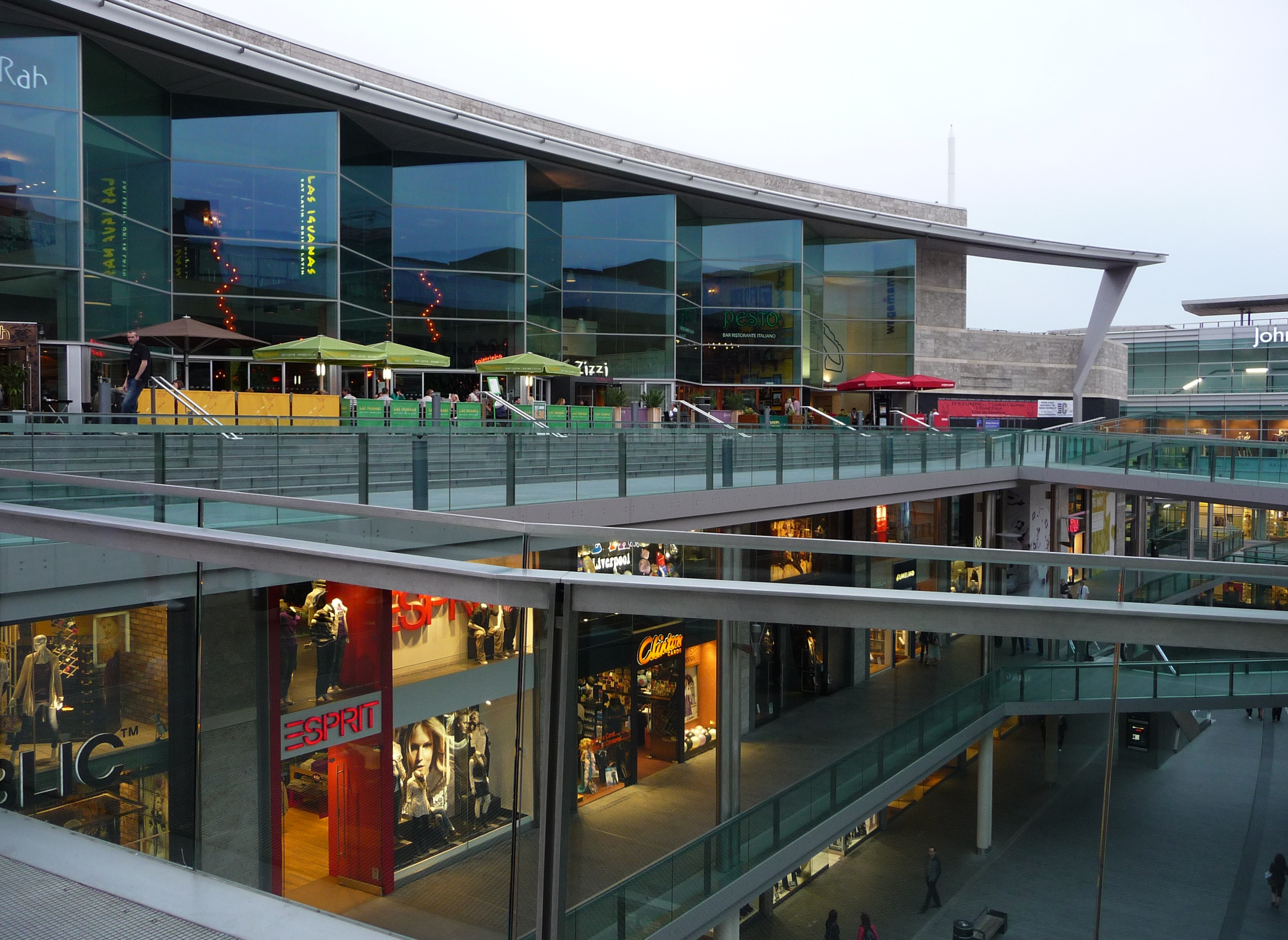
The Leisure Terrace at Liverpool ONE, 2008.

Originally was due to house either a Selfridges or Harvey Nichols store, but was deemed unsuitable for Liverpool ONE. The third anchor unit was then split – half of which was the city's second and also its flagship branch of Flannels until its relocation to Parker street in 2022 along with the first-ever stand alone branch of Ermenegildo Zegna outside London. This unit operates as its own store but backs onto the far left side of Flannels with its own entrance, specialised staff and carrier bags similar to that of Louis Vuitton in Manchester – a store which shares a similar concept. This makes this Flannels more like a Department Store than a regular Flannels store such as seen in the Metquarter (another shopping centre within Liverpool). Stores also on this lane include Red Run, Vincentius and also a Fred Perry. Other Retailers such as Muji, Simon Carter, Whistles and Mulberry are reportedly looking for possible sites in NML or the immediate area such as Hanover Street or Peters Lane.

In January 2012, Harvey Nichols Signed for 20,000 sq ft (1,900 m^{2}) former Habitat Unit for their "Beauty Bazaar" store in the UK after Birmingham which opened in the autumn of 2012.

=== Paradise Street ===
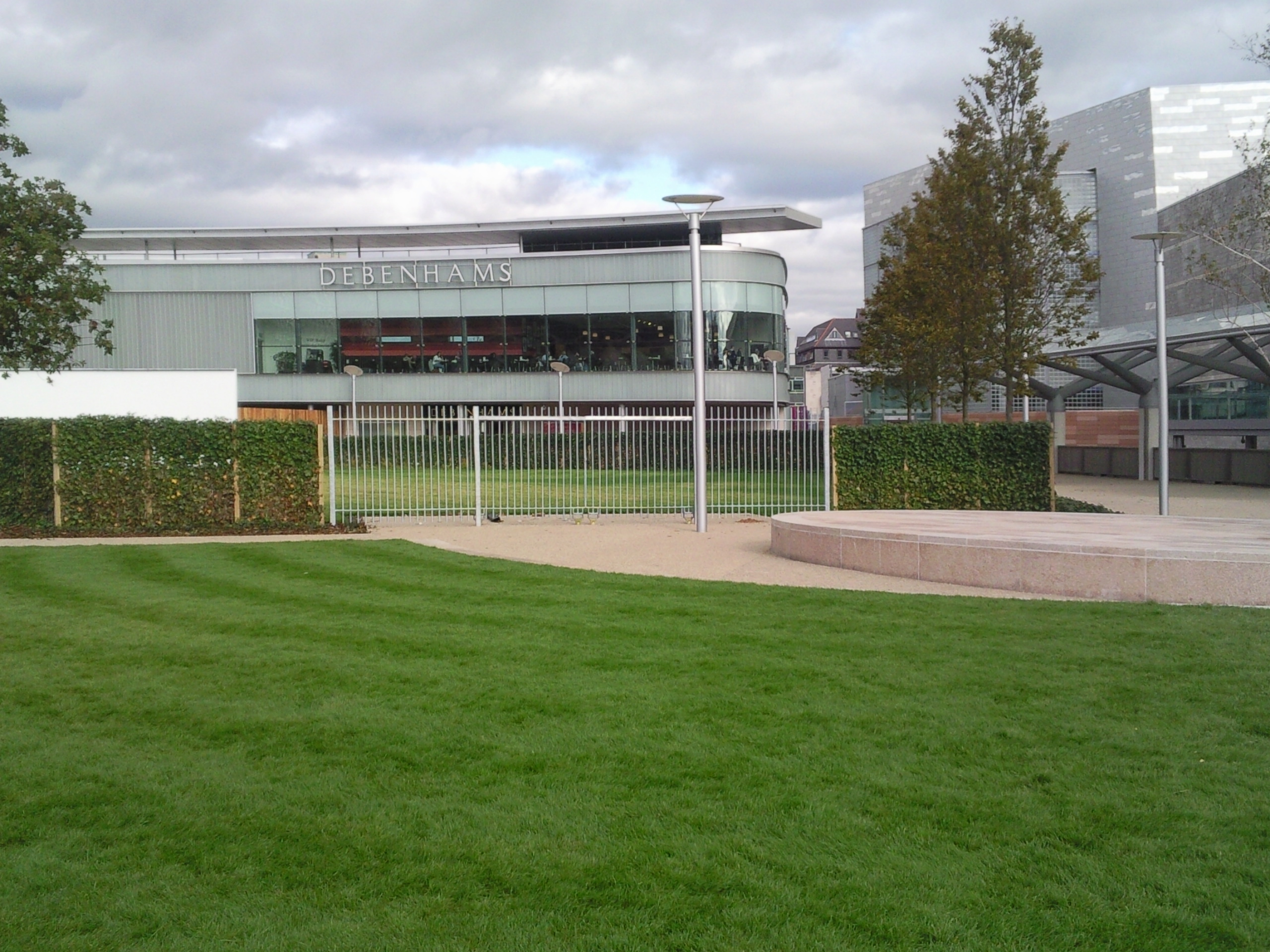
The flagship Debenhams store viewed from Chavasse Park

A wide pedestrianised shopping street, with flagship store John Lewis, also on this street; Pret a Manger, JD Sports, Footasylum, Levis, Starbucks, Waterstones (the entrance is at the back), Urban Outfitters, Hugo Boss, The North Face, etc.

The Japanese clothing brand Uniqlo will open its first store in Liverpool at Paradise Street in April 2025.

=== South John Street ===
The heart of the new shopping area, two levels of high-street shops and links to the park, with anchor stores John Lewis and Debenhams at each end. There are many shops on South John Street such as 3, Adidas, AllSaints, Ann Summers, The Body Shop, Disney Store, Game, Gap, HMV, Hollister Co., Mango, Monsoon, Pull and Bear, Republic, SportsDirect.com, Vodafone, Zara and Zara Home. Liverpool Football Club opened their second club shop in Liverpool city centre on South John Street, whilst Everton Football Club also opened up a new club shop on the street named 'Everton Two', chosen so that the store's address, "Everton Two, Liverpool ONE", would resemble a football scoreline. The 'Leisure Level' of the South John Street district is home to the Odeon multiplex cinema alongside a number of restaurants, including Barburrito (Mexican), Café Rouge (French), Dinomat (American grill/general dining), Gourmet Burger Kitchen (Burgers/general dining), Las Iguanas (Latin American), Nando's (Portuguese/African/general dining), PizzaExpress (Italian/general dining), Pizza Hut (Italian/general dining), Sblended (Milkshakes), Wagamama (Japanese), Yo! Sushi (Japanese), Zizzi (Italian).

=== The park ===
A reinstated Chavasse Park, rising in terraces from Strand Street to pavilions on a terrace high above South John Street – this is where the Odeon is located along with Wagamama, Pizza Hut, Yo Sushi!, Café Rouge and other eateries. The park conceals a 3,000-space underground car park, accessed by ramps and tunnels from Strand Street. The park is named after member of the Chavasse family, including Noel Chavasse, a local war hero and one of only three holders of the Victoria Cross and Bar.

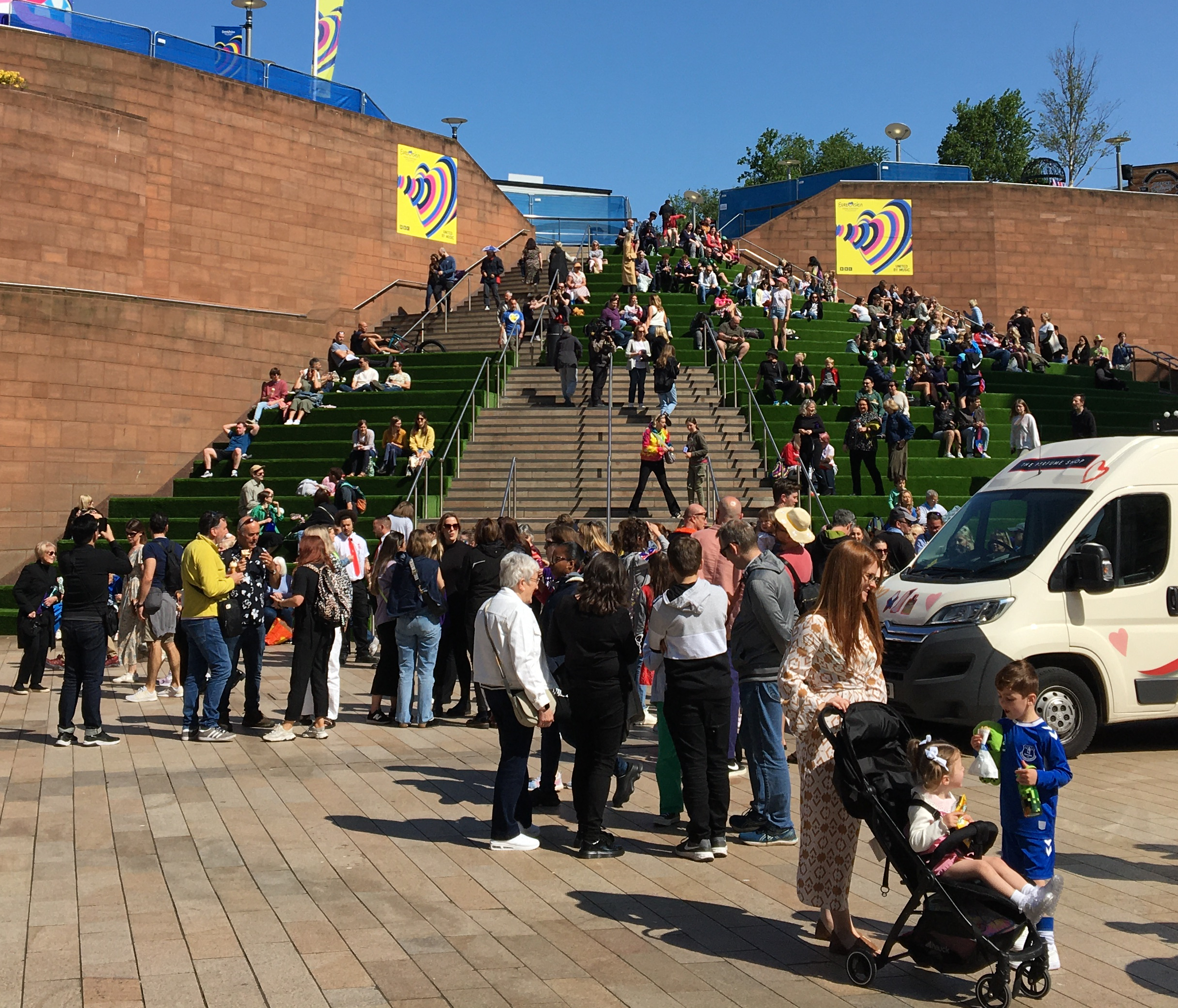
Sugar House Steps - with green covering

Access to and from Custom House Place and Thomas Steers way is via Sugar House Steps, which are made up of concentric sets of steps and stone terracing suitable for sitting on. From spring to November the seating is covered in green, and they are commonly known as the Green Steps.

=== Point of arrival ===
Includes a bus station and a multi-storey car park at the edge of the main shopping district.

The new multimillion-pound Paradise Street Interchange (renamed Liverpool ONE bus station in September 2009), is a public transport interchange built in November 2005 to replace Paradise Street Bus Station, which was demolished to make way for the new Liverpool ONE shopping district.

As the main access point to the Liverpool ONE shopping centre, the interchange includes ten bus stops each designed to take up to 20 departures per hour serving 10 million people per year.

== Criticism ==
The Open Spaces Society has criticised the removal of public rights of way in the development area and fears that universal access to Liverpool's central streets may be denied to citizens in future. However, the streets that make up Liverpool ONE still exercise public rights of way in agreement with the city council, for as long as this agreement stands. Liverpool ONE has not removed any public rights of way, and all streets within Liverpool ONE are subject to the byelaws of the city council in relation to the Highways Act.

The centre has also been criticised for alienating local businesses (such as Lewis's, Rapid Hardware, and the stores on Bold Street), and for shifting Liverpool's shopping district (noting empty units around Lime Street and Ranelagh Street). From Liverpool ONE's construction beginning in 2008, it siphoned customers away from Cavern Walks, St. John's Shopping Centre, and Metquarter. However, the project won a MAPIC Award in 2009.
