= D-TV =

Music video block on The Disney Channel

- No. of episodes: 240

Original release
- Network: The Disney Channel
- Release: May 5, 1984 – 1989

D-TV is a music video television series produced by Charles Braverman and edited by Ted Herrmann. Premiering on May 5, 1984, on the Disney Channel, the series combined both classic and contemporary popular music with various footage of vintage animated shorts and feature films from The Walt Disney Company, created out of the trend of music videos on cable channel MTV (which is currently serve as the flagship namesake property of the MTV Entertainment Group, a sub-division of the Skydance TV, division of Skydance Corporation), which inspired the name of this series.

== Content ==
Most songs used in the series were contemporary hits (e.g., "Kiss on My List" and "Private Eyes" by Hall & Oates), though older songs like Sheb Wooley's "The Purple People Eater" were also featured. These music videos were shown as filler material on the Disney Channel (which refrained from airing commercials at the time), as well as being the focus of several television specials. Home video collections were also released on VHS, Beta, CED Videodisc, and Laserdisc formats. After the first run of D-TV, in 1989, a second series was produced known as DTV².

== Theme music ==
The main title music, known as "RPM", was created in 1981 by a recording company called Network Music. When the segments were shown individually on television, the title music used was from "Sunset Boulevard", also by Network Music. In the show's opening, a cheese-like Moon zooms out to reveal a black background with blue musical notes. A silhouette of Mickey Mouse's head rises from the Moon, and it exits below the screen. The letter D (in the corporate Disney font) and the letters TV appear and zoom out to attach to the head. Finally, after a few seconds, the screen zooms into the silhouette of the head, which reveals several vintage Disney cartoon clips.

=== DTV ===
- The American Breed: Bend Me, Shape Me (Gusto Records, Inc.)
- The Ames Brothers: Rag Mop (MCA Records, Inc.)
- The Andrews Sisters: Hold Tight (Want Some Seafood, Mama) (MCA Records, Inc.)
- The Andrews Sisters: Straighten Up and Fly Right (MCA Records, Inc.)
- The Andrews Sisters: Winter Wonderland (MCA Records, Inc.)
- The Angels: My Boyfriend's Back (Polygram Records, Inc.)
- Anne Murray: Daydream Believer (Capitol Records, Inc.)
- Anne Murray: Hey! Baby! (Capitol Records, Inc.)
- Anne Murray: Snowbird (Capitol Records, Inc.)
- Annette Funicello: Pineapple Princess (Vista)
- Annette Funicello: Tall Paul (Vista)
- Aretha Franklin: Respect (Atlantic Recording Corp.)
- Aretha Franklin: Think (Atlantic Recording Corp.)
- Bachman-Turner Overdrive: Taking Care of Business (Polygram Records, Inc.)
- Barrett Strong: Money (That's What I Want) (Motown)
- Bay City Rollers: I Only Want to Be with You (Arista Records, Inc.)
- The Beach Boys: Be True to Your School (Capitol Records, Inc.)
- The Beach Boys: California Girls (Capitol Records, Inc.)
- The Beach Boys: Catch a Wave (Capitol Records, Inc.)
- The Beach Boys: Dance, Dance, Dance (Capitol)
- The Beach Boys: Good Vibrations (Capitol Records, Inc.)
- The Beach Boys: I Get Around (Capitol Records, Inc.)
- The Beach Boys: The Man with All the Toys (Capitol Records, Inc.)
- The Beach Boys: Papa Oom Mow Mow (Capitol Records, Inc.)
- The Beach Boys: When I Grow Up (To Be a Man) (Capitol)
- Beethoven: Piano Concerto No. 5 (Everest)
- Beethoven: Symphony No. 5 (Everest)
- Betty Hutton: Doctor, Lawyer, Indian Chief (Capitol Records, Inc.)
- Big Joe Turner: Shake, Rattle & Roll (Atlantic Recording Corp.)
- Bill Haley & The Comets: Rock Around the Clock (MCA Records, Inc.)
- Bill Haley & The Comets: See You Later, Alligator (MCA Records, Inc.)
- Billy Bland: Let the Little Girl Dance (Vee-Jay)
- Billy Preston: Nothing from Nothing (A&M Records, Inc.)
- Billy Preston: Will It Go Round in Circles? (A&M Records, Inc.)
- Bizet: Habanera (from "Carmen") (Everest)
- The Blasters: I'm Shakin' (Warner Bros. Records, Inc)
- The Blues Brothers: Flip, Flop and Fly (Atlantic)
- Bobby Darin: Beyond the Sea (Atlantic Recording Corp.)
- Bobby Darin: Lazy River (Atlantic Recording Corp.)
- Bobby Darin: Splish Splash (Atlantic Recording Corp.)
- Bobby Darin: What'd I Say? (Atlantic Recording Corp.)
- Bobby Day: Rockin' Robin (Original Sound Record Co., Inc.)
- Bobby Freeman: Do You Wanna Dance (Roulette Records, Inc.)
- Bobby Helms: Jingle Bell Rock (MCA Records, Inc.)
- Bobby Lewis: Tossin' and Turnin' (Gusto Records, Inc.)
- Bobby Vee: Devil or Angel (Atlantic Recording Corp.)
- The Box Tops: The Letter (Arista Records, Inc.)
- Brahms: Hungarian Dance No. 5 (Everest)
- Brenda Lee: Rockin' Around the Christmas Tree (MCA Records, Inc.)
- Buddy Holly and the Crickets: That'll Be the Day (MCA Records, Inc.)
- Burning Sensations: Belly of the Whale (EMI America)
- The Bus Boys: American Worker (Arista Records, Inc.)
- The Cadets: Stranded in the Jungle (Collectables)
- Charlie Parker: Moose the Mooche (Everest Record Group)
- The Chords: Sh-Boom (Life Could Be a Dream) (Atlantic Recording Corp.)
- Chris Kenner: I Like It Like That (Atlantic Recording Corp.)
- Chubby Checker: The Hucklebuck (MCA Records, Inc)
- Chubby Checker: Limbo Rock (MCA Records, Inc.)
- Chubby Checker: The Twist (MCA Records, Inc.)
- Chuck Berry: Johnny B. Goode (Mercury Records, Inc.)
- Chuck Berry: Rock & Roll Music (Mercury Records, Inc.)
- Chuck Willis: What Am I Living For? (Atlantic Recording Corp.)
- Clarence Carter: Too Weak to Fight (Atlantic Recording Corp.)
- The Clovers: Love Potion #9 (EMI America Records)
- The Coasters: Charlie Brown (Atlantic Recording Corp.)
- The Coasters: Down in Mexico (Atlantic Recording Corp.)
- The Coasters: Poison Ivy (Atlantic Recording Corp.)
- The Coasters: Yakety Yak (Atlantic Recording Corp.)
- The Coconuts: If I Only Had a Brain (EMI America Records)
- The Contours: Do You Love Me (Motown)
- The Danleers: One Summer Night (Mercury Records, Inc.)
- Danny & the Juniors: At the Hop (K-TEL)
- David Bowie: Let's Dance (EMI America Records)
- DeBarge: Rhythm of the Night (Motown)
- Dee Clark: Raindrops (Vee-Jay)
- Dee Dee Sharp: Do the Bird (ABKCO Records, Inc.)
- Dee Dee Sharp: Mashed Potato Time (ABKCO Records, Inc.)
- The Diamonds: Little Darlin' (K-TEL)
- Dino, Desi & Billy: I'm a Fool (Warner Bros. Records, Inc)
- The Doobie Brothers: Listen to the Music (Warner Bros. Records, Inc.)
- The Doobie Brothers: It Keeps You Runnin (Warner Brothers)
- Doris Troy: Just One Look (Atlantic Recording Corp.)
- The Dovells: You Can't Sit Down (Abkco)
- The Drifters: On Broadway (Atlantic Recording Corp.)
- The Drifters: Saturday Night at the Movies (Atlantic Recording Corp.)
- The Drifters: Save the Last Dance for Me (Atlantic Recording Corp.)
- The Drifters: Some Kind of Wonderful (Atlantic Recording Corp.)
- The Drifters: There Goes My Baby (Atlantic Recording Corp.)
- The Drifters: Up on the Roof (Atlantic Recording Corp.)
- Duke Ellington: Take the "A" Train (Everest Record Group)
- Duran Duran: Hungry Like the Wolf (Mercury Records, Inc.)
- Earth, Wind & Fire and The Emotions: Boogie Wonderland (Columbia Records, Inc.)
- Eddie Money: Baby Hold On to Me (Columbia Records, Inc.)
- The El Dorados: At My Front Door (Vee-Jay Records)
- Ella Mae Morse: Blacksmith Blues (Capitol Records, Inc.)
- Elvis Presley: All Shook Up (RCA)
- Elvis Presley: G.I. Blues (RCA)
- Elvis Presley: Hound Dog (RCA)
- Elvis Presley: Jailhouse Rock (RCA)
- Elvis Presley: Stuck on You (RCA)
- The Everly Brothers: Temptation (Warner Bros. Records, Inc.)
- Faron Young: Country Girl (Capitol Records, Inc.)
- Fats Domino: Blueberry Hill (EMI America Records)
- Fats Domino: I'm Walking (EMI America Records)
- The Fiestas: So Fine (K-TEL)
- The Fireflies: You Were Mine (Vee-Jay Records)
- The Five Americans: Western Union (ABNAK Records)
- The Four Tops: Ain't No Woman (Like the One I Got) (MCA Records, Inc.)
- The Four Tops: I Can't Help Myself (Sugar Pie Honey Bunch) (Motown)
- The Four Tops: Reach Out, I'll Be There (Motown)
- Frank Sinatra: Blue Skies (Columbia Records, Inc.)
- Freddy Cannon: Palisades Park (Freddy Cannon, Inc.)
- Gary Lewis & The Playboys: String Along (Liberty)
- Gene Chandler: Duke of Earl (Vee-Jay)
- Gene Chandler: You Threw a Lucky Punch (Vee-Jay)
- Gene Vincent: Be-Bop-A-Lula (Capitol Records, Inc.)
- Gladys Knight & the Pips: Friendship Train (Motown)
- Gladys Knight & the Pips: I Heard it Through the Grapevine (Motown)
- Glen Campbell: Country Boy (You've Got Your Feet in L.A.) (Capitol Records, Inc.)
- Glen Campbell: Southern Nights (Capitol Records, Inc.)
- Grand Funk Railroad: The Loco-Motion (Capitol Records, Inc.)
- Hall & Oates: Kiss on My List (RCA)
- Hall & Oates: Private Eyes (RCA)
- Huey Lewis & The News: The Heart of Rock & Roll (Chrysalis Records)
- Jackie Wilson: Lonely Teardrops (Brunswick Record Corp.)
- Jackie Wilson: (Your Love Keeps Lifting Me) Higher and Higher (Brunswick Record Corp.)
- Jackson 5: Dancing Machine (Motown)
- James & Bobby Purify: I'm Your Puppet (Arista Records, Inc.)
- James & Bobby Purify: Shake a Tail Feather (Arista Records, Inc.)
- Jan & Dean: Surf City (K-TEL)
- Jerry Lee Lewis: Whole Lot of Shakin' Going On (Sun Records, Inc.)
- Jimmy Cliff: Wonderful World, Beautiful People (Island)
- Jimmy Cliff: You Can Get It If You Really Want (Mango)
- Jimmy Hughes: Neighbor (Tend to Your Business) (Vee-Jay Records)
- Jimmy McCracklin: The Walk (Vee-Jay)
- Jo Stafford and Johnny Mercer & The Pied Pipers: Candy (Capitol Records, Inc.)
- Joanie Sommers: Johnny Get Angry (Warner Bros. Records, Inc.)
- Joey Dee: Shout (Gusto)
- Joey Dee: Peppermint Twist (Gusto)
- Johnny Burnette: Dreamin' (Liberty)
- The Johnny Otis Show: Willie and the Hand Jive (Capitol Records, Inc.)
- Johnny Tillotson: Poetry in Motion (London Records, Inc.)
- Johnny Tillotson: Willow Tree (London Records, Inc.)
- Juice Newton: Angel of the Morning (Capitol Records, Inc.)
- Juice Newton: Love's Been a Little Bit Hard on Me (Capitol)
- Juice Newton: Queen of Hearts (Capitol Records, Inc.)
- Juice Newton: Shot Full of Love (Capitol Records, Inc.)
- Kay Starr: Side By Side (Capitol Records, Inc.)
- Kenny Loggins: Footloose (Columbia Records, Inc.)
- Kool & the Gang: Celebration (Polygram Records, Inc.)
- Korsakov: The Flight of the Bumblebee (Everest)
- LaVern Baker: Jim Dandy (Atlantic Recording Corp.)
- Leapy Lee: Little Arrows (MCA Records, Inc.)
- Lena Horne: Stormy Weather (RCA)
- Leo Sayer: Long Tall Glasses (I Can Dance) (Chrysalis Records)
- Leo Sayer: You Make Me Feel Like Dancing (Chrysalis Records)
- Lipps, Inc.: Funkytown (Casablanca Records)
- Little Richard: Long Tall Sally (K-TEL)
- Little Richard: Tutti Frutti (K-TEL)
- Liszt: Hungarian Rhapsody No. 2 (Everest)
- Lloyd Price: (You've Got) Personality (MCA Records, Inc.)
- Louis Armstrong: High Society (MCA Records, Inc.)
- Louis Armstrong: On the Sunny Side of the Street (MCA Records, Inc.)
- Louis Prima and Keely Smith: I've Got You Under My Skin (Capitol Records, Inc.)
- Louis Prima and Keely Smith: That Old Black Magic (Capitol)
- The Lovin' Spoonful: Do You Believe in Magic (RCA)
- Madonna: Dress You Up (Warner Brothers)
- The Mamas & the Papas: California Dreamin' (MCA Records, Inc.)
- The Mamas & the Papas: Dedicated to the One I Love (MCA Records, Inc.)
- The Mamas & the Papas: Go Where You Wanna Go (MCA Records, Inc.)
- The Mamas & the Papas: I Saw Her Again Last Night (MCA Records, Inc.)
- The Marcels: Blue Moon (K-TEL)
- Martha and the Vandellas: Dancing in the Street (Motown)
- The Marvelettes: Don't Mess With Bill (Motown)
- The Marvelettes: The Hunter Gets Captured by the Game (Motown)
- The Marvelettes: Too Many Fish in the Sea (Motown)
- Marvin Gaye: Can I Get a Witness (Motown)
- Marvin Gaye: Pride and Joy (Motown)
- Marvin Gaye and Kim Weston: It Takes Two (Motown)
- Marvin Gaye and Tammi Terrell: Ain't No Mountain High Enough (Motown)
- Marvin Gaye and Tammi Terrell: If I Could Build My Whole World Around You (Motown)
- Mary Wells: Two Lovers (Motown)
- Matthew Wilder: Break My Stride (Epic Records, Inc.)
- Maxine Nightingale: Right Back to Where We Started From (EMI America Records)
- Michael Jackson: Beat It (Motown)
- Michael Sembello: Automatic Man (Warner Bros. Records, Inc.)
- The Mills Brothers: Glow Worm (MCA Records, Inc.)
- The Miracles: Mickey's Monkey (Motown)
- The Miracles: Shop Around (Motown)
- The Miracles: You've Really Got a Hold on Me (Motown)
- The Monotones: Book of Love (Original Sound Record Corp. Inc.)
- Nat King Cole: The Christmas Song (Capitol Records, Inc.)
- Otis Redding: Try a Little Tenderness (Atlantic Recording Corp.)
- Otis Redding with Carla Thomas: Tramp (Atlantic Recording Corp.)
- Pablo Cruise: What You Gonna Do (When She Says Goodbye) (A&M Records, Inc.)
- Patti Page: The Doggie in the Window (Polygram Records, Inc.)
- Peggy Lee: All Right, OK, You Win (Capitol Records, Inc.)
- The Pointer Sisters: Neutron Dance (RCA)
- Rare Earth: I Just Want to Celebrate (Motown)
- The Rascals: Groovin' (Atlantic Recording Corp.)
- Ray Charles: Hit the Road, Jack (Ray Charles Enterprises, Inc.)
- The Rays: Silhouettes (ABKCO Records, Inc.)
- The Reflections: (Just Like) Romeo and Juliet (Motown)
- Richard Thompson: Two Left Feet (Hannibal)
- Ringo Starr: Oh My My (Capitol Records, Inc.)
- Rockwell: Somebody's Watching Me (Motown)
- Roger Miller: King of the Road (Polygram Records, Inc.)
- The Ronettes: Sleigh Ride (Original Sound Record Corp. Inc.)
- Ronny & The Daytonas: G.T.O. (Vee-Jay)
- Roscoe Gordon: Just a Little Bit (Vee-Jay)
- Rose Royce: Car Wash (MCA Records, Inc.)
- The Routers: Let's Go (Warner Bros. Records, Inc.)
- Rufus Thomas: Walking the Dog (Atlantic Recording Corp.)
- Ruth Brown: This Little Girl's Gone Rockin' (Atlantic Recording Corp.)
- Sandy Nelson: Teen Beat (Original Sound Record Co., Inc.)
- Sarah Vaughan: Gone with the Wind (Mercury Records, Inc.)
- Sarah Vaughan: Misty (Mercury Records, Inc.)
- The Shades of Blue: Oh How Happy (Motown)
- Sheb Wooley: The Purple People Eater (K-TEL)
- The Shirelles: Mama Said (Original Sound Record Co., Inc.)
- The Silhouettes: Get a Job (Arista Records, Inc.)
- Shostakovich: Waltz No. 2 (Everest)
- Sister Sledge: We Are Family (Atlantic Recording Corp.)
- The Skyliners: Pennies from Heaven (Original Sound Record Co. Inc.)
- The Spaniels: Automobiles (Vee Jay)
- Spike Jones and His City Slickers: The Blue Danube (RCA)
- Spike Jones and His City Slickers: Holiday for Strings (RCA)
- Steve Winwood: While You See a Chance (Warner Bros. Records, Inc.)
- Stevie Wonder: Castles in the Sand (Motown)
- Stevie Wonder: Fingertips, Part 1 (Motown)
- Stevie Wonder: Fingertips, Part 2 (Motown)
- Stevie Wonder: For Once in My Life (Motown)
- Stevie Wonder: Hey, Harmonica Man (Motown)
- Stevie Wonder: I Was Made to Love Her (Motown)
- Stevie Wonder: My Cherie Amour (Motown)
- Stevie Wonder: A Place in the Sun (Motown)
- Stevie Wonder: Signed, Sealed, Delivered (I'm Yours) (Motown)
- Stevie Wonder: Travelin' Man (Motown)
- Stevie Wonder: Uptight (Everything's Alright) (Motown)
- Strauss: Trisch Trasch Polka (Everest)
- The Supremes: Baby Love (Motown)
- The Supremes: Nothing But Heartaches (Motown)
- The Supremes: Love is Like an Itching in My Heart (Motown)
- The Supremes: Stop! In the Name of Love (Motown)
- The Supremes: You Keep Me Hangin' On (Motown)
- Survivor: Eye of the Tiger (Volcano)
- Tchaikovsky: 1812 Overture (Everest)
- Tchaikovsky: Piano Concerto No. 1 (Everest)
- Tchaikovsky: Violin Concerto in D (Everest)
- Tennessee Ernie Ford: Sixteen Tons (Capitol)
- The Temptations: Ain't Too Proud to Beg (Motown)
- The Temptations: It's Summer (Motown)
- The Temptations: Just My Imagination (Running Away with Me) (Motown)
- The Temptations: My Girl (Motown)
- Tom Jones: It's Not Unusual (Polygram Records, Inc.)
- Tom Petty and The Heartbreakers: Don't Do Me Like That (Warner Bros. Records, Inc.)
- Tommy Dorsey: The Music Goes Round and Round (RCA)
- Tommy Roe: Dizzy (K-TEL)
- The Turtles: You Showed Me (Abcko)
- The Videos: Trickle, Trickle (Collectables)
- Vivaldi: Storm (Everest)
- The Vogues: Magic Town (Warner Bros. Records, Inc.)
- Wilson Pickett: Funky Broadway (Atlantic Recording Corp.)
- Wilson Pickett: Land of 1,000 Dances (Atlantic Recording Corp.)
- Wilson Pickett: Mustang Sally (Atlantic Recording Corp.)
- Woody Herman: Fat Mama (Fantasy Records)
- Yes: Owner of a Lonely Heart (Atco)
- Yusef Lateef: Morning (Everest Record Group)

== Home media ==
Many songs listed above were released on VHS, in five separate volumes. The first three volumes, entitled "Pop & Rock", "Rock, Rhythm & Blues", and "Golden Oldies", were released in late 1984, as part of Walt Disney Home Video's "Wrapped and Ready to Give" holiday promotion. In the Summer of 1985, two more volumes, "Love Songs" and "Groovin' For a '60s Afternoon", were released.

== Television specials ==
Disney aired three DTV television specials on NBC in 1986 and 1987: DTV Valentine (Feb 14, 1986, re-titled DTV Romancin' in later airings), DTV Doggone Valentine (Feb 13, 1987), and DTV Monster Hits (Oct 30, 1987).

=== DTV Valentine ===
DTV Valentine focused on love and romance music.

==== Songs ====
- Betty Everett: The Shoop Shoop Song (It's in His Kiss)
- Stevie Wonder: I Just Called to Say I Love You
- Madonna: Dress You Up
- Stray Cats: Rock This Town
- Lionel Richie: Hello
- Desiree Goyette: Hey Mickey
- Elton John & Kiki Dee: Don't Go Breaking My Heart
- Bella Notte (from Lady and the Tramp)
- Elvis Presley: (Let Me Be Your) Teddy Bear
- Eurythmics: There Must Be an Angel (Playing with My Heart)
- Once Upon a Dream (from Sleeping Beauty)
- Huey Lewis and the News: The Heart of Rock & Roll
- The Contours: Do You Love Me
- Someday My Prince Will Come (from Snow White and the Seven Dwarfs)
- Whitney Houston: You Give Good Love

==== Voice characterizations ====
- Tony Anselmo - Donald Duck
- Corey Burton - Gruffi Gummi
- Eddie Carroll - Jiminy Cricket
- Mary Costa - Aurora (archive footage)
- Paul Frees - Ludwig Von Drake, Announcer
- Les Perkins - Mickey Mouse
- Will Ryan - Goofy, Pongo
- Judith Searle - Chip and Dale
- Bill Shirley - Prince Phillip (archive footage)
- Lisa St. James - Dalmatian puppies

=== DTV Doggone Valentine ===
DTV Doggone Valentine focused on love songs with a tribute to Disney's dog and cat characters.

==== Songs ====
- Wham!: "Wake Me Up Before You Go-Go"
- John Travolta & Olivia Newton-John: "You're The One That I Want"
- The Flamingos: "I Only Have Eyes for You"
- Huey Lewis and The News: "Workin' for a Livin'"
- Bee Gees: "Stayin' Alive"
- Kenny Rogers: "Lady"
- "Weird Al" Yankovic: "Eat It"
- George Thorogood and The Destroyers: "Bad to the Bone"
- Paul Anka: "Puppy Love"
- The Siamese Cat Song (from Lady and the Tramp)
- The Soul Survivors: "Expressway to Your Heart"
- Stray Cats: "Stray Cat Strut"
- Deniece Williams: "Let's Hear It for the Boy"
- Maurice Williams and The Zodiacs: "Stay"

==== Voice characterizations ====
- Wayne Allwine - Mickey Mouse
- Albert Ash - Ludwig Von Drake
- Eddie Carroll - Jiminy Cricket
- Bill Farmer - Goofy
- Maurice LaMarche - Awards Show MC
- Will Ryan - Pongo
- J. J. Jackson - Announcer
- Lisa St. James - Dalmatian puppies
- Russi Taylor - Minnie Mouse, Dalmatian puppies

=== DTV Monster Hits ===
DTV Monster Hits was focused on Halloween-themed music and footage. It was also referred to as Disney's DTV Monster Hits by the show's narrator, Gary Owens. By this time, Hans Conried had died and the Magic Mirror, now credited at the end of the show as Man in the Magic Mirror, was played by Jeffrey Jones.

==== Songs ====
- Michael Jackson: "Thriller"
- Ray Parker, Jr.: "Ghostbusters"
- Creedence Clearwater Revival: "Bad Moon Rising"
- Bobby "Boris" Pickett featuring The Crypt-Kickers: "Monster Mash"
- Rockwell: "Somebody's Watching Me"
- Electric Light Orchestra: "Evil Woman"
- Stevie Wonder: "Superstition"
- Pat Benatar: "You Better Run"
- Spike Jones and His City Slickers: "That Black Old Magic"
- Daryl Hall: "Dreamtime"
- The Many Adventures of Winnie the Pooh: "Heffalumps & Woozles"
- The Eurythmics: "Sweet Dreams (Are Made of This)"

==== Voice characterizations ====
- Wayne Allwine - Mickey Mouse
- Tony Anselmo - Donald Duck
- Stuart Buchanan - The Huntsman (archive footage)
- Adriana Caselotti - Snow White (archive footage)
- Bing Crosby - Brom Bones (archive footage)
- Bill Farmer - Goofy
- June Foray - Witch Hazel, Pauline
- Sterling Holloway - Winnie the Pooh (archive footage)
- Barrie Ingham - Basil of Baker Street (archive footage)
- Jeffrey Jones - Magic Mirror
- Maurice LaMarche - Leslie J. Clark
- Gary Owens - Announcer
- Vincent Price - Ratigan (archive footage)
- Lucille La Verne - The Evil Queen (archive footage)
- Paul Winchell - Tigger (archive footage)

==== Notes ====
- June Foray returned as the voice of Witch Hazel to dub new lines. These can be seen when she introduces Michael Jackson and during the segment where she is reading a book about scary stories, which is a segment lifted directly from a Disneyland episode, The Mad Hermit of Chimney Butte.
- New lines for Donald Duck were dubbed during the Ghostbusters theme, where he says he's "not afraid of ghosts" is a new line.
- New scene in The Great Mouse Detective.
