= The Beatles Story =

Museum dedicated to the Beatles, situated in the Royal Albert Dock, Liverpool, England

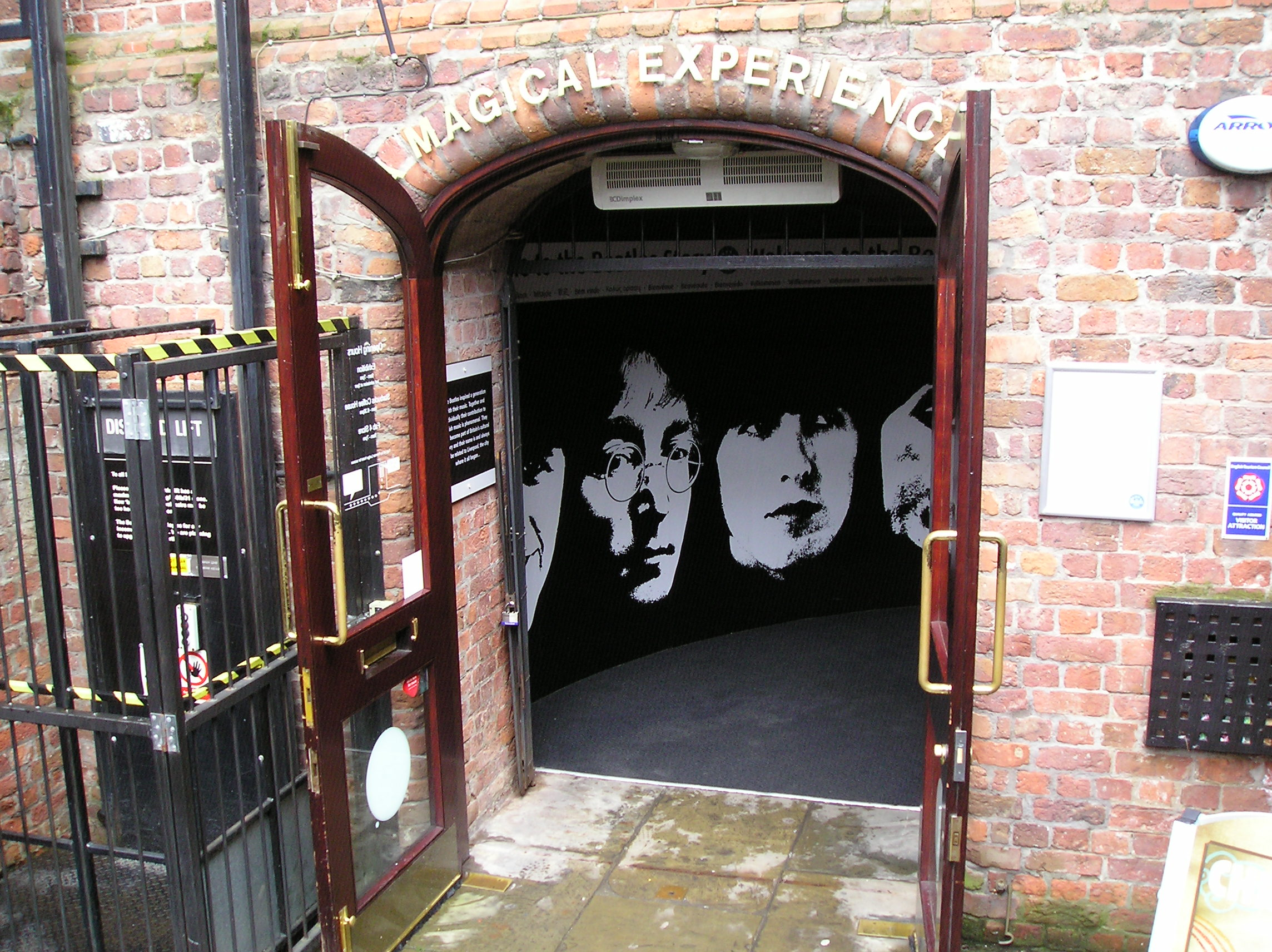
- Museum entrance
- Established: 1 May 1990
- Location: Royal Albert Dock, Liverpool, England
- Coordinates: 53.3993°N 2.9920°W
- Owner: Mersey Ferries
- Public transit access: Liverpool One bus station, Liverpool James Street railway station
- Website: beatlesstory.com

The Beatles Story is a museum in Liverpool about the Beatles and their history. It was devised and created by Mike and Bernadette Byrne and officially opened on 1 May 1990. It is located on the historical Royal Albert Dock, and is owned by Mersey Ferries, part of Merseytravel. The Beatles Story contains recreations of The Casbah Coffee Club, The Cavern Club and Abbey Road Studios among other historical Beatles items, such as John Lennon's spectacles, George Harrison's first guitar and a detailed history about the British Invasion and the solo careers of every Beatle. The museum was also recognised as one of the best tourist attractions of the United Kingdom in 2015. The exhibition was preceded by the Cavern Mecca (1981–1984) and Beatles City (1984–1986).

== Future ==
On October 20, 2026, Apple Corps announced plans to relocate and expand The Beatles Story, a Beatles museum in Liverpool, to a new 100,000-square-foot site at the former St John's Market in St Johns Shopping Centre, opposite Liverpool Lime Street station. The new attraction, scheduled to open in 2028, will use immersive technology, original artefacts and reconstructed sets to trace the band's history, from their early years in Liverpool and Hamburg to their international success. Several of the recreated locations, including The Cavern Club, Abbey Road Studios and Shea Stadium, will incorporate sets and props from Sam Mendes' four films, which are scheduled for release in April 2028. The redevelopment will also include a Yellow Submarine-themed viewing experience at St Johns Beacon, featuring a panoramic view of the city. Apple Corps will take over the operation of The Beatles Story in 2027 before moving it to the new site the following year.

Apple Corps chief executive Tom Greene described the attraction as a destination that would do justice to the band's legacy, saying: "Liverpool birthed the greatest band in history and today we are announcing a new experience in the city that does justice to that legacy. Just like Graceland or Dollywood, it's fitting that The Beatles will have a world class destination for fans to visit in the centre of the city where the story started."

Paul McCartney said he found it "incredible and humbling" that people remained interested in the band's story, adding: "I love Liverpool. It's part of who I am. It's part of who the Beatles are. If you'd told us this was going to happen when we were hanging out and getting started, we'd never have believed it." Ringo Starr also welcomed the plans, saying: "Liverpool was, and still is, a music city. And now we are expanding the Beatles Story … how far out. The beat goes on."

The project will also support emerging artists and local cultural initiatives through the Apple Corps Liverpool Trust, a charitable initiative that will receive a contribution from every ticket sold to The Beatles Story. Steve Rotheram, mayor of the Liverpool City Region, said the plans would give fans "a reason to make the pilgrimage to their spiritual home and experience the city, its music and its culture for themselves". Andy Burnham praised the project's ambition and its potential to create jobs and opportunities, including for the next generation of artists. Mendes said that filming the Beatles films in Liverpool had "brought home just how extraordinary the band's legacy in the city is", adding that the experience would help support emerging talent. The Liverpool attraction follows plans for a separate Beatles fan experience at 3 Savile Row in London, scheduled to open in 2027.

== See also ==
- Liverpool Beatles Museum
- List of music museums
- Strawberry Field
