= Lita Roza =

English singer (1926–2008)

- Born: Lilian Patricia Roza; 14 March 1926; Liverpool, England
- Died: 14 August 2008 (aged 82); London, England
- Occupations: Singer, actress
- Spouse: Ronnie Hughes (m. 1956)
- Parents: Francis Vincent Roza (1900-1979); Elizabeth Anne Roza (1900-1973)
- Relatives: Alma Elizabeth Roza (1929-1994); Malverna Ann Roza (1932-1948); Madeline Christina Roza (1935-1937); Henry Francis Roza (d. 1943)

Lilian Patricia Roza (14 March 1926 – 14 August 2008) was an English singer best known for her 1953 recording "(How Much Is) That Doggie in the Window?", which reached No. 1 on the UK Singles Chart.

== Early life ==
Lilian Patricia Roza was born in Liverpool on 14 March 1926, the eldest of seven children to Francis Vincent Roza, a Spanish-born marine engineer and part-time musician, and Elizabeth Anne Roza, who was English. She began work at an early age to support the family. She owed her sultry looks and passion to her father, an amateur accordionist and pianist of Filipino descent who played in Liverpool nightclubs.

== Career ==
At the age of 12, she saw an advert in the local newspaper for juvenile dancers and passed the audition. By the time she was 15, was working with the comedian and fellow Merseysider Ted Ray. A year later, she answered an advertisement and got a job as a singer in the "New Yorker" club in Southport for £5 per week. Soon afterwards she signed up with the Harry Roy Orchestra in London, moving on to work with other bands of the era, including that of Edmundo Ros.

By the time she was 18, Roza had left show business, married an American and moved to Miami, Florida. However, the marriage did not last, and shortly after the Second World War, she returned to the United Kingdom. In 1950, she became the lead female singer with the Ted Heath band, and by 1954, had achieved enough public acclaim to leave the band and pursue a solo recording career. She appeared as a lounge singer in the 1955 film Cast a Dark Shadow, where she sang "Leave Me Alone".

Roza's "(How Much Is) That Doggie in the Window?", a cover version of Patti Page's original, was the peak of her career, topping the UK Singles Chart. It made her the first British female singer to have a No. 1 hit in the UK chart. Roza disliked her hit single so much that she never performed it live. Her covers of the songs "Hey There" and "Jimmy Unknown" became minor hits in the mid-1950s.

She remained a top UK recording artist during the remainder of the 1950s and was voted the Top British Female Singer in the New Musical Express poll winners' charts from 1951 to 1955. Melody Maker readers also voted her its Top Girl Singer in the dance band section of the poll in 1951 and 1952.

Roza made three appearances in UK heats for the Eurovision Song Contest selection in 1957, 1959 and 1960. On 14 March 2001, the Liverpool Wall of Fame was inaugurated by Roza, located opposite the Cavern Club on Mathew Street in Liverpool.

On 28 November 2002, she gave her last public performance on Radio Merseyside.

== Personal life and death ==
Lita Roza married twice during her lifetime. Her first marriage occurred in 1944 to a serviceman in the Royal Canadian Air Force, to whom he proposed after their third date while she was performing in wartime London; the union ended in divorce, prompting a brief relocation to the United States before she returned to England to resume her singing career. In 1956, Roza wed trumpet player Ronnie Hughes, a member of Ted Heath's orchestra; the marriage ultimately dissolved, though the couple maintained a friendly relationship and experienced occasional reconciliations thereafter. Throughout her adult life, Roza kept her personal affairs relatively private amid her professional commitments, with limited public details emerging about her relationships beyond these unions. She shared a close bond with her sister Alma Warren, also a singer, and the two occasionally performed together alongside their father, who played piano-accordion in Liverpool venues.

Roza died at her home in London on 14 August 2008 from natural causes at the age of 82.

Elton John said that "we just don't make singers like Lita Roza anymore".

== Discography ==
Singles

- 1951 "Allentown Jail" / "I Wish I Knew"
- 1951 "I'm Gonna Wash That Man Right Outa My Hair" / "A Wonderful Guy"
- 1952 "My Very Good Friend – The Milkman" / "Colonel Bogey"
- 1952 "Oakie Boogie" / "Raminay"
- 1952 "Love, Where Are You Now?" / "High Noon"
- 1953 "Return To Paradise" / "Tell Me We'll Meet Again" (London 45-1349)
- 1953 "(How Much Is) That Doggie in the Window?" / "Tell Me We'll Meet Again" – UK No. 1
- 1953 "Seven Lonely Days" / "No-one Will Ever Know"
- 1953 "Crazy Man, Crazy" / "Oo! What You Do to Me"
- 1954 "Changing Partners" / "Just A Dream or Two Ago"
- 1954 "Make Love to Me" / "Bell Bottom Blues"
- 1954 "Secret Love" / "Young at Heart"
- 1954 "Skinnie Minnie (Fishtail)" / "My Kid Brother"
- 1954 "Call off the Wedding" / "The 'Mama Doll' Song"
- 1954 "Smile" / "Love is a Beautiful Stranger"
- 1955 "Heartbeat" / "Leave Me Alone"
- 1955 "Let Me Go Lover" / "Make Yourself Comfortable"
- 1955 "Tomorrow" / "Foolishly"
- 1955 "Two Hearts, Two Kisses (Make One Love)" / "Keep Me in Mind"
- 1955 "The Man in the Raincoat" / "Today and Ev'ry Day"
- 1955 "Hey There" / "Hernando's Hideaway" – UK No. 17
- 1956 "Jimmy Unknown" / "The Rose Tattoo" – UK No. 15
- 1956 "Too Young to Go Steady" / "You're Not Alone"
- 1956 "Love Where Are You Now" / "Why Don't You Believe Me?"
- 1956 "If Someone Had Told Me" / "Have You Heard?"
- 1956 "No Time for Tears" / "But Love Me (Love but Me)"
- 1956 "Innismore" / "The Last Waltz"
- 1956 "Hey! Jealous Lover" / "Julie"
- 1957 "Lucky Lips" / "Tears Don't Care Who Cries Them"
- 1957 "Tonight My Heart She Is Crying" / "Five Oranges Four Apples"
- 1957 "I Need You" / "You've Changed"
- 1958 "Pretend You Don't See Him" / "Ha-Ha-Ha!"
- 1958 "I Need Somebody" / "You're the Greatest"
- 1958 "I Could Have Danced All Night" / "The Wonderful Season of Love"
- 1958 "Sorry, Sorry, Sorry" / "Hillside in Scotland"
- 1958 "Nel Blu Dipinto Di Blu (Volare)" / "It's a Boy"
- 1959 "This Is My Town" / "Oh Dear What Can the Matter Be"
- 1959 "Allentown Jail" / "Once in a While"
- 1959 "Let It Rain, Let It Rain" / " Maybe You'll Be There"
- 1965 "What Am I Supposed to Do" / "Where Do I Go from Here"
- 1965 "Keep Watch Over Him" / "Stranger Things Have Happened"

EPs

- 1956 Lita Roza
- 1956 Love-ly Lita Roza Sings
- 1957 Lita Roza
- 1957 Lita Roza No. 2
- 1958 Between the Devil and the Deep Blue Sea

Albums

- 1955 Listening in the After-Hours
- 1956 Love Is the Answer
- 1956 Lita Roza
- 1957 Between the Devil and the Deep Blue Sea
- 1958 Me on a Carousel
- 1960 Drinka Lita Roza Day recorded on 4 May 1960

Film

- Cast a Dark Shadow - Lounge singer

Compilations

- The Best of Lita Roza (CD, 2007)

== See also ==
- List of artists who reached number one on the UK Singles Chart
- List of artists under the Decca Records label
