= Liverpool Wall of Fame =

Tourist attraction

Coordinates: 53.40632°N 2.98835°W

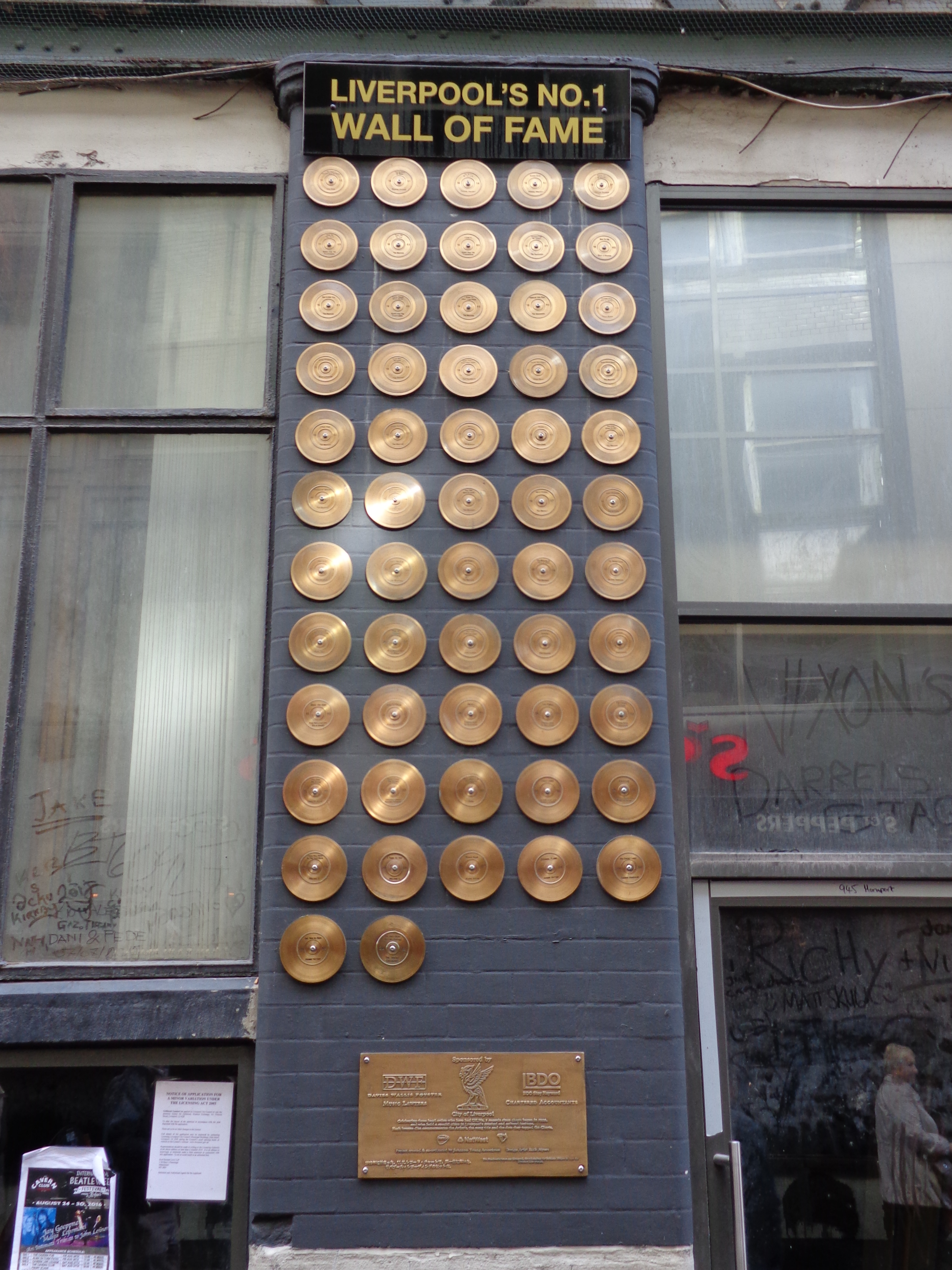
Liverpool's Wall of Fame on Mathew Street

The Liverpool Wall of Fame is a wall in front of the Cavern Club on Mathew Street in Liverpool, England. It features a litany of groups which played at the original Cavern Club, including acts from Liverpool who have reached No. 1 in the UK Singles Chart. The wall also features a disc for every Liverpool musical act that had a No. 1 hit. Artists from Liverpool have produced more No. 1 hit singles than any other city in the world.

It was unveiled on 14 March 2001 by Lita Roza, whose song "(How Much Is) That Doggie in the Window?" was the first song by a Liverpool act—and the first British act—to reach No. 1 on the UK singles chart. It features 58 Liverpool No. 1 UK chart hits since 1952, and also incorporates an award-winning music-themed seat. The wall is dominated by the Beatles, who have 18 records featured on it.

== See also ==
- List of music museums
- Rock and Roll Hall of Fame
