= Probe Records (shop) =

English record shop

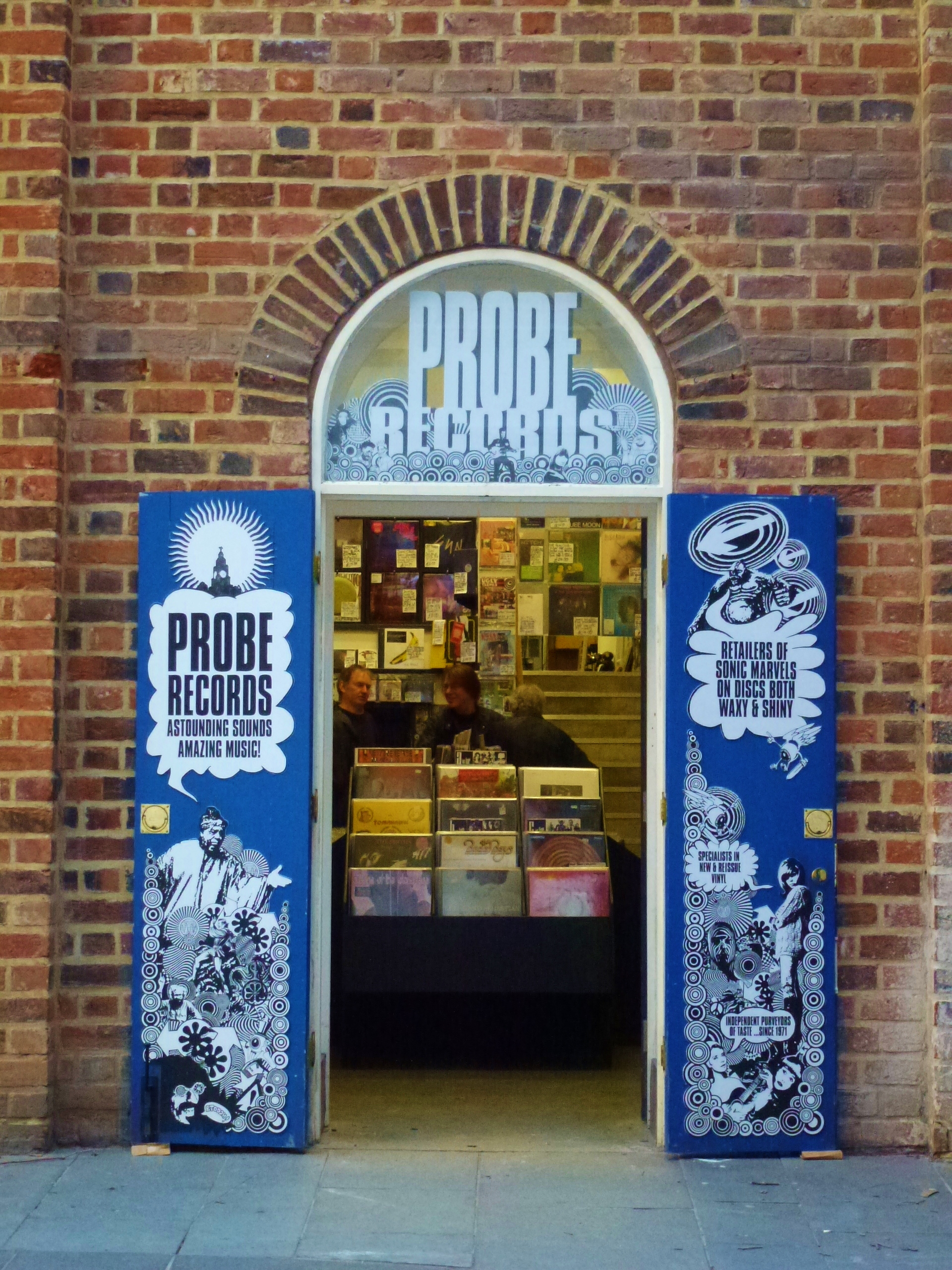
Probe Records, relocated to Bluecoat Chambers in 2010

Probe Records is a small independent record shop in Liverpool, England.

Founded in 1971 by Geoff and Annie Davies and their friend Dave Keats, the shop was originally located on Clarence Street, off Brownlow Hill with a second location soon opened in the basement of Silly Billies clothes shop.

The shop relocated in 1976 to Button Street around the corner from Eric's Club on Mathew Street and found itself at the centre of the city's emerging punk and new wave music scene, acting as a supporter of local independent bands and musicians. Davies admitted that he was far more a music enthusiast than he was a businessman.

There are many stories about the famous musicians who worked behind the counter during this period. Not all of them are true, but it is documented that Pete Burns, Pete Wylie and Paul Rutherford were among them.

Probe was seen as a key part of the Liverpool music scene. John Robb wrote in Louder than War: “Without Geoff, most of post-punk Liverpool probably would not have happened.” Paddy Shennan wrote in the Liverpool Echo: “Geoff didn't just revolutionise their record collections, he transformed their lives.”

During the 1980s, Probe set up an independent wholesale arm of the business as part of the independent distribution network The Cartel. Many larger record retailers throughout the north-west of England such as HMV, Virgin Records and Our Price bought most of their independent label stock from Probe.

In 1981 Geoff Davies set up the record label Probe Plus, which he initially ran from above the shop. The name was chosen to avoid confusion with the American record label Probe Records. Davies told The Quietus in 2011: “The label kind of grew from the shop. Probe was such an integral part of the local scene that I was constantly coming into contact with bands.”

In 1986, Geoff and Annie were divorced and Annie took sole ownership of the shop while Geoff retained the record label.

By the 1990s, the shop had again relocated, this time to Slater Street off Bold Street around the corner from The Zanzibar on Seel Street, where it stayed until 2010 before moving to Bluecoat Chambers on School Lane in the centre of the city.

== Death of Geoff and Annie Davies ==
Geoff Davies died on 12 September 2023, 2 weeks after Annie. The Liverpool Post wrote: “Probe was a joint enterprise, and its massive legacy is shared in equal parts between them.”

== See also ==
- The Armadillo Tea Rooms (1980s), Liverpool
