= The Fireflies =

American doo-wop group

The Fireflies were an American doo-wop group from Long Island, New York, from the late 1950s to early 1960s. They were one of the first groups in which all band members both sang and played instruments. In addition, they were the first all-white vocal harmonizing group to appear at The Apollo Theater.

The group was formed by producer Gerry Granahan in Long Island in 1957, and underwent several line-up changes. Their debut single for Roulette Records was "The Crawl", followed by the Ribbon Records 1959 release "You Were Mine", which was their biggest hit. It was written by 19-year-old Paul Giacalone about a girl he met while he was touring. It spent 16 weeks on the Billboard Hot 100, and peaked at #21 on October 26, 1959, while reaching #15 on Canada's CHUM Hit Parade. The members involved in the song "You Were Mine" in 1959 were Paul Giacalone (bass singer and drummer; September 28, 1939 – June 27, 2013), Ritchie Adams (lead singer; real name Richard Adam Ziegler), Lee Reynolds, John Viscelli (sax and vocals), Carl Girasoli (guitar and vocals). Carl's youngest brother, Louie, was one of the chorus singers. Since Louie was a child at the time, he fit the needed voice for the sung responses. Following the single's success, The Paulette Sisters released an answer record called "I Was Yours".

Later singles included "I Can't Say Goodbye", "Marianne" and "My Girl" (all 1960); "I Can't Say Goodbye" was the only charter, spending three weeks on the Billboard Hot 100, peaking at #90. In 1962 the group reappeared on Taurus Records with "You Were Mine for Awhile" and "Blacksmith Blues" on Hamilton Records; three other singles followed on Taurus, but the group never returned to the charts. They lasted until 1967 before disbanding for good.

Adams went on to release some solo singles and had a successful songwriting career, including the hits "Tossin' and Turnin'" and "After the Lovin'".

Original member and saxophonist/singer, John Viscelli, still resides in southern Florida.

Paul Giacalone was diagnosed with cancer in late 2012. He died from the disease on Long Island on June 27, 2013, aged 73.

Ritchie Adams died on March 6, 2017, at the age of 78.

Carl Girasoli owned a guitar shop in Deltona, FL in later years and died on June 17, 2009.

Current members are Marco Gueli, Nick "Nicky Stix" Catello, Tony Errigio, and Vic Puma.
