= The Armadillo Tea Rooms =

Café in Liverpool, England

Coordinates: 53.4063°N 2.9868°W

External image
- Statue of Carl Jung, with plaque bearing quotation. Armadillo Tea Rooms, circa 1980's

The Armadillo Tea Rooms was a café in Liverpool that was a significant part of the early '80s music scene. They were in business from 1978 into the 1990s.

== Description ==
The Liverpool café's significance to the early '80s music scene was helped by their proximity to Mathew Street and Probe Records.

Patrick Clarke, in The Quietus described it as

The Armadillo was the control room, where bands, fanzine writers, artists and organisers would congregate over cheap pots of tea, swapping ideas, theories, proclamations and band members.

They were especially noted for the furry seat covers on the toilets.

== History ==
The tea rooms was in business from 1978 to the 1990s, possibly until 1992.

As of 2025, the building is now occupied by "The Flanagan's Apple" (also known as Flanagan's Apple Irish Pub).
