= The Cartel (record distributor) =

UK record distribution organisation

- Genre: Punk; Hardcore; Independent music
- Country of origin: England, United Kingdom

The Cartel was a co-operative record distribution organisation in the United Kingdom, set up by a number of small independent record labels to handle their distribution to record shops. Pooling their resources in this way allowed them to compete with the larger distribution operations of the major record labels, and also to gain access to the larger shop chains.

The association of regional distributors included some of the most notable labels of the 1980s UK post-punk and indie scene: Rough Trade, Backs, Fast Forward, Nine Mile, Probe, Revolver and Red Rhino.

== Indie labels and distribution ==
The 1980s music scene in the UK saw a growth in small independent record labels or "indies", often formed by bands themselves, or by local record shops. The cost of technology and studio time was falling, making it possible to produce an album for a budget that didn't need the backing of an established label. Recording, publishing and pressing a record was now accessible to small labels, but distributing them into the shops was still difficult. The market at this time was based on vinyl, both albums and singles being important. Most record shops were still independent, i.e. local, rather than national chains. This required a wholesale distribution network that had national reach to these individual shops.

Regional distributors appeared, offering pressing and distribution deals to the small labels that would reach all of the shops in a region. Shops preferred to deal with only a handful of distributors and so the small distributors agreed to also distribute each other's stock, segregating the market by the geography of the shops, rather than by the content or particular labels. This was the beginning of the idea behind the Cartel.

== Richard Scott and Tony K ==
The architect of the Cartel was Richard Scott of London's Rough Trade.

Tony Kostrzewa (always known as "Tony K") of York's Red Rhino label. Tony K, who had a long career in music retail and publishing had started Red Rhino as a record shop in 1977, then made its first release as a label in 1979. By this time Rough Trade were already operating as a distributor which included supplying Red Rhino's shop. The Cartel regional distribution structure included Backs (Norwich), Fast Forward (Edinburgh), Nine Mile (Leamington Spa), Probe (Liverpool), Revolver (Bristol), Red Rhino (York) and Rough Trade (London), together with Jungle Records (London) who supplied the nationwide Our Price Records chain until 1986.

By 1984 the Cartel had enough success with bands like Joy Division, Depeche Mode, Cocteau Twins, Pigbag, The Smiths, Vice Squad and many others to move to a large warehouse in Kings Cross, London. This was the peak of the Cartel's influence. Not only were they an effective distributor, but they were having an influence on the music itself, and the rise of "indie". As more of the mainstream retailers began to take product from the Cartel, this gave more exposure to independent labels' releases through these high-street shops. As many of them were the same shops who returned sales figures to the chart pollsters, indie releases featured more highly in the charts.

We short-circuited the need for anyone to sign to a major to get their records into the charts.

— Geoff Travis

== Demise of the Cartel ==
Bill Drummond and Jimmy Cauty of The KLF described the Cartel thus, "The Cartel is, as the name implies, a group of independent distributors across the country who work in conjunction with each other providing a solid network of distribution without stepping on each other's toes. We are distributed by the Cartel." By the time this was published though, the Cartel had already collapsed.

At the end of 1988, Red Rhino Distribution Ltd. folded, going into voluntary liquidation in 1989, followed by Fast Forward in early 1990 and Rough Trade in 1991.
