= Mr. Five by Five =

Song performed by Ella Mae Morse

"Mr. Five by Five" is a 1942 popular song by Don Raye and Gene DePaul, that describes a heavyset man who is "five feet tall and five feet wide". The person highlighted by the song was Jimmy Rushing, the featured vocalist of Count Basie's Orchestra from 1935 to 1948.

Ella Mae Morse with Freddie Slack and His Orchestra had a hit recording with the song in 1942 (Capitol 115); it was number one on the Harlem Hit Parade for two non-consecutive weeks.

== Other versions ==
"Mr. Five by Five" has also been performed by others:

- Later in 1942, Harry James and His Orchestra (vocal by Helen Forrest) with a best-selling platter on the Columbia label; it appeared on Variety's 10 Best Sellers on Coin Machines in December 1942.
- Harmony Sisters, Thore Ehrling's Orchestra. Recorded in Stockholm on August 31, 1943. Released on the 78 rpm Telefunken A-5359 in Sweden and Telefunken T-8508 in Norway. The A side was "I'm Coming Home, Virginia".
- Harry Parry on Crazy Rhythm, recorded by Harry Parry's Radio Rhythm Club Sextet.
- The Humphrey Lyttelton Big Band with Jimmy Rushing, Upbeat (URCD174)
- The Andrews Sisters recorded the song on July 22, 1942 for Decca Records (catalog No. DECCA-18470B). This reached No. 14 in the Billboard chart.
- Imelda May on the soundtrack to the 2013 film, Gangster Squad.

== See also ==
- List of Billboard number-one R&B singles of the 1940s
