= Johnny Tyler =

American country musician

Lehman Monroe "Johnny" Tyler (February 6, 1918 – September 25, 1961) was an American country musician.

== Biography ==
His career began around 1945 on Fargo Records with the band Original Hillbillies. In 1947 he signed a recording contract with RCA Victor, where he had the largest success of his career. His most well-known single for RCA was "Oakie Boogie", which hit the Billboard charts in 1947. He also recorded eight tracks with Luke Wills for RCA, and was a member of Wills' band, the "Rhythm Busters" for a time.

In 1953, he appeared on radio WGST out of Atlanta, Georgia. He became a member of Jimmie Smith and His Texans, which often made appearances at the Joe Cotton Rhythm Ranch. He recorded a few more singles at this time as well. In 1954 he played regularly on WGST and on the WSB Barn Dance, with Jimmie Smith. Later singles were issued on Specialty, Ekko, Liberty, Starday, and Rural Rhythm.

He died in 1961 at age 43. In 2004, most of his RCA singles were collected and released on compact disc as Two Dozen Western Swing And Boogie Jewels (Cattle Compact CCD-300). This compilation also includes six tracks with Luke Wills' Rhythm Busters, and the original 1946 Satchel Records version of "Oakie Boogie".

== Discography ==
Year	Part #	Titles	Notes
Fargo Records
1945	no #	"Please My Darling, Think of Me" // "Give Me Back My Heart"	as 'Johnny Tyler & His Riders of the Rio Grande'
1945	F-1110	"This Troubled Mind (O' Mine)" (v: Johnny Tyler) // "I Didn't Think This Could Happen To Me" (v: Johnny Tyler)	with 'Rocky Ship & His Prairie Pioneers'
1946	F-1113	"I Can't Trust You Now" // "If I Knew Where You Are Tonight"	as 'Johnny Tyler's Riders of the Rio Grande'
Stanchel Records
1946	SR-101	"Oakie Boogie" // "Yes I Do" (v: Red Egner)	as 'Johnny Tyler & Riders of the Rio Grande'
1946	SR-102	"Troubles On Your Mind" // "Dora Darlin'"	
Bixby Records
1946	WM-500	"Yes-I-Do" // "Okie Boogie"	(reissue) as 'Johnny Tyler & His Original Hillbillies'
RCA Victor Records
1947	20-2171	"So Round, So Firm, So Fully Packed" / "New Pretty Blonde (New Jole Blon)"	as 'Johnny Tyler & The Riders of the Rio Grande'
1947	20-2182	"Freight Train Boogie" // "Rockin' Chair Money"	
1947	20-2290	"Oakie Boogie" [re-make] // "Texas Red"	
1947	20-2368	"Behind The Eight Ball" // "I Don't Know Where To Go, But I'm Goin'"	
1947	20-2503	"City of Memphis" // "Oh How You Lied"	
1947	20-2620	"Peppin' Through The Keyhole (Watching Jole Blond)" // "That Wild And Wicked Look In Your Eye"	
1948	20-2656	"(Don't Telephone, Don't Telegraph) Tell A Woman" // "Can't Get The Foot Off The Rail"	
1948	20-2774	"Old McDonald's Boogie" // "Swamp Woman Blues"	
1948	20-2928	"Find 'em, Fool 'em and Forget 'em" // "Fiddlin' Joe"	Advance Folk Release, Billboard, Jun 12, 1948
1948	20-3139	"Little Rock A-R-K" // "Cornbread and Butter Beans"	
1948	20-3280	"I Never See My Baby Alone" // "Jealous Blues"	
1949	21-0017	"Almost Every Time" // "Two Can Play Your Game"	
1949	21-0053	"It Ain't Far To The Bar" // "Gravy Train"	
1949	21-0105	"Nothin' Won't Cure The Blues" // "I Got Mine"	
Specialty Records
1953	SP-713	"Take Your Blues And Go" // "A Sinner's Song"	
1953	SP-717	"Hillbilly Preacher" // "I'm Grateful To You"	
Ekko Records
1955	EK-1000	"Devil's Hot Rod" // "Words You Forgot To Say"	
1955	EK-1001	"Ship With The Golden Sail" // "Where You Gonna Hide"	
Liberty Records
1955	55007	"One Way Heart" // "Heads Up"	
Starday Records
1956	45-263	"County Fair" // "Lie To Me, Baby"	
Rural Rhythm Records
1957	45-509	"Devil's Slate"; "Back Luck (They Call Me)" // "Ballad of Billy The Kid"; "Coal Miner's Blues"	4-song 45 rpm 7-inch EP
1957	510	"Devil On My Shoulder" // "If I'm To Bear The Name"	
1958	512	"It Felt So Good" // "God's Gonna Turn Us To Dust"	
1958	45-512	"Flowers While You're Living"; Yak Yak" // "It Felt So Good"; "God's Gonna Turn Us To Dust"	4-song 45 rpm 7-inch EP
1959	RR 45-515	"County Fair" // "Lie To Me, Baby"	(reissue of 45-263)
1960	SPEC RR 509	"God's Gonna Turn Us To Dust"; "Coal Miner's Blues" // "Devil's Slate"; Bad Luck (They Call Me)"	4-song 45 rpm 7-inch EP (reissue with one different song)
