= Ekko Records =

- Status: Defunct
- Genre: Western swing, Country music
- Country of origin: United States
- Location: Memphis, Tennessee

Ekko Records was an American independent record label operating in the 1940s and 1950s from Memphis, Tennessee releasing records mostly in western swing and country music style.

== History ==
Ekko was founded by Ed Bloodworth and operated from two offices, one from 4949 Hollywood Blvd, Hollywood, California and the head office on Union Avenue in Memphis (also home to Sun Records). Among the artists who recorded for the label were Eddie Bond, Johnny Tyler, Buddy Griffin, Riley Crabtree, and Al Dexter. Also recording for the label were The Cochran Brothers featuring Eddie and Hank Cochran.
