= Liverpool Coach Station =

Coach station in Liverpool, England

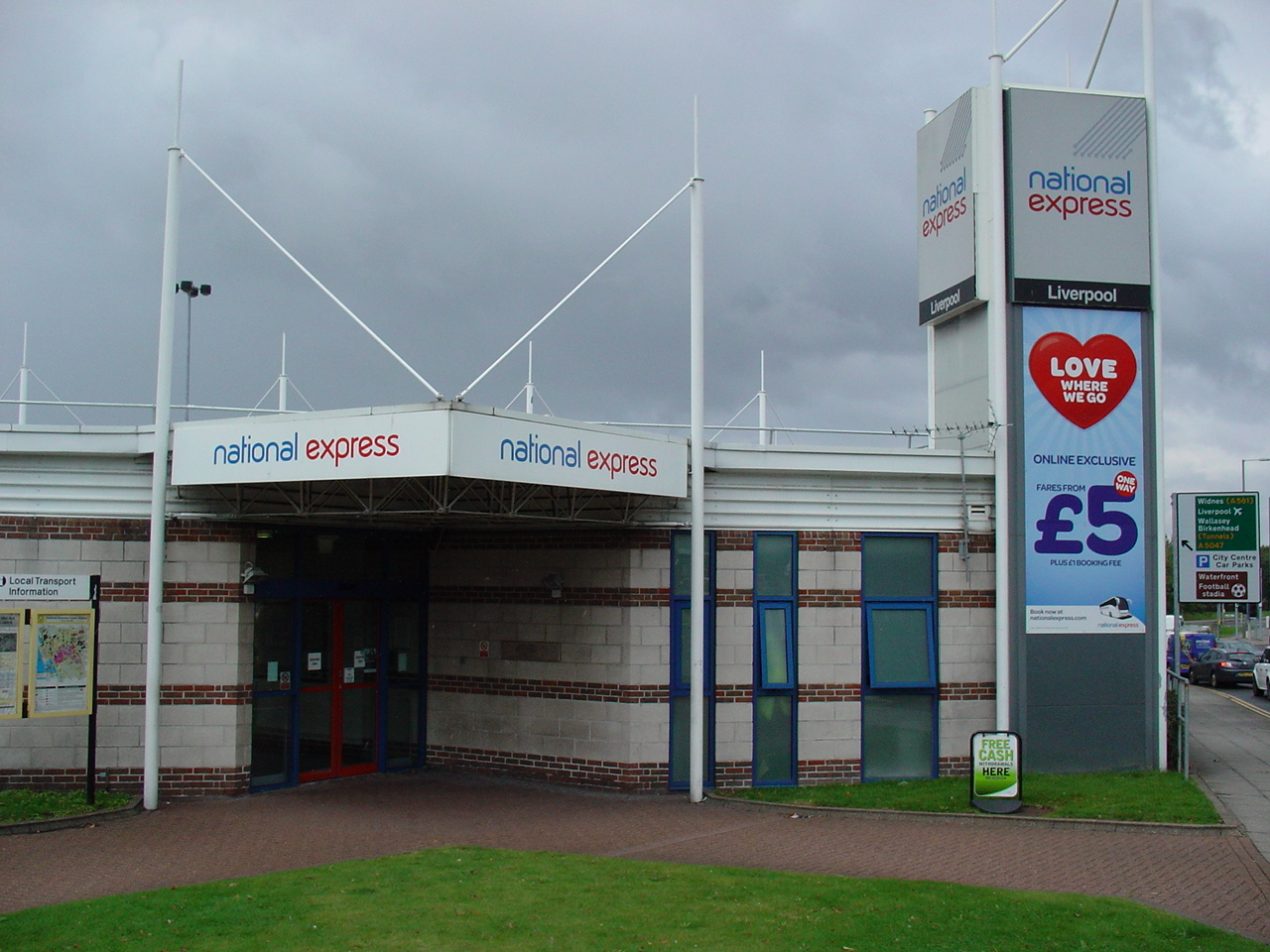
- Entrance to the coach station

General information
- Other names: Norton Street Coach Station
- Location: Liverpool, England
- Coordinates: 53.410134°N 2.975935°W
- System: Coach station
- Bus stands: 6
- Bus operators: National Express

History
- Opened: November 1994
- Closed: 14 January 2016
Location

Liverpool Coach Station (also known as Norton Street Coach Station) was a major coach station in Liverpool, England which offered services to 122 destinations throughout the United Kingdom provided by National Express. It opened in November 1994 and was closed on 14 January 2016.

== History ==
The coach station opened in November 1994 with access to 35 destinations. It celebrated its 20th anniversary on 20 November 2014 with passengers at the coach station treated to a glimpse of the National Express Leyland Leopard coach which ran the first coach service from the station in 1994.

In December 2015 it was announced that the coach station would close with the last coach departing on 14 January 2016 with all services relocating to the Liverpool One bus station.

== Gallery ==
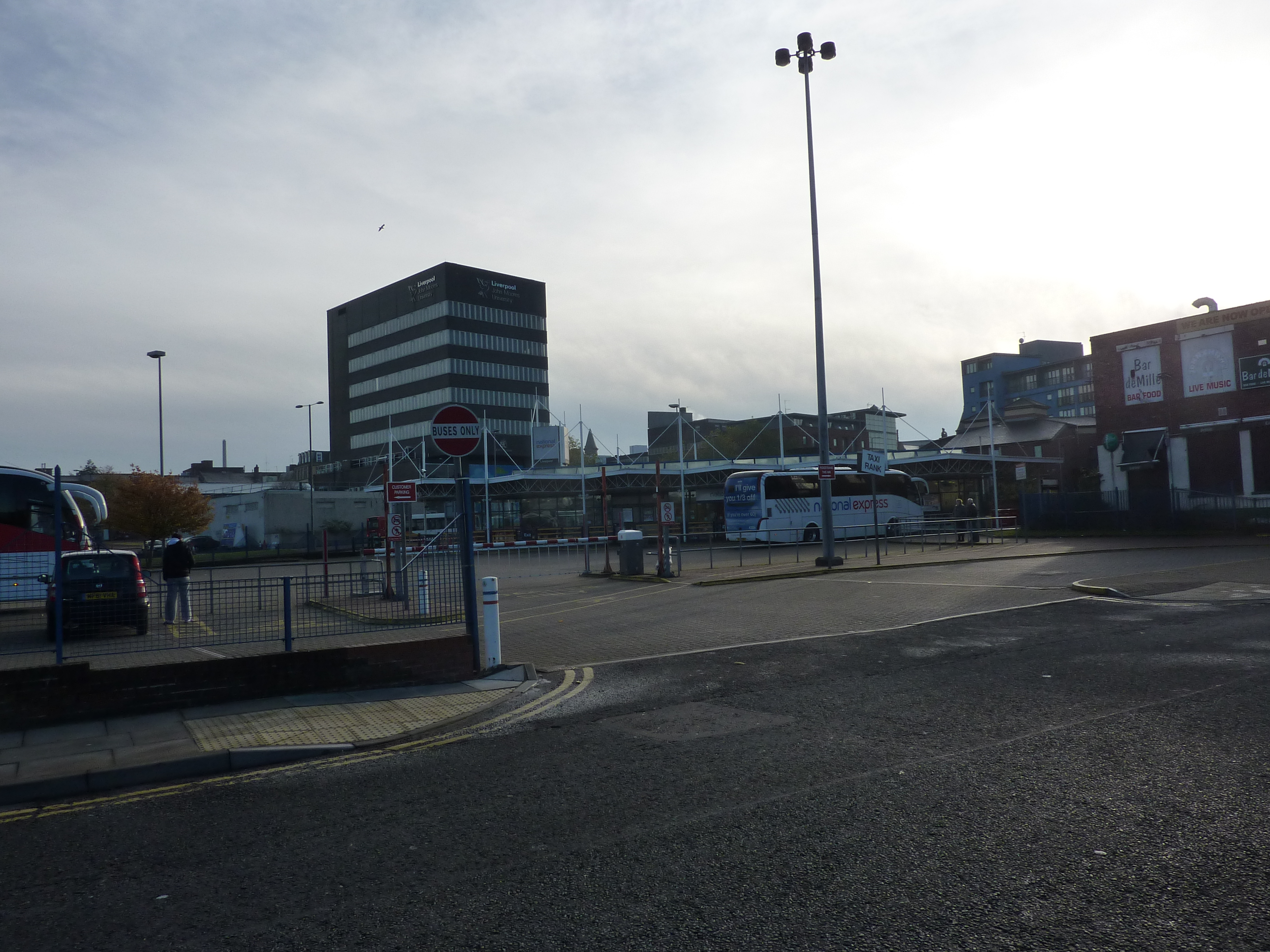
View of the coach station concourse

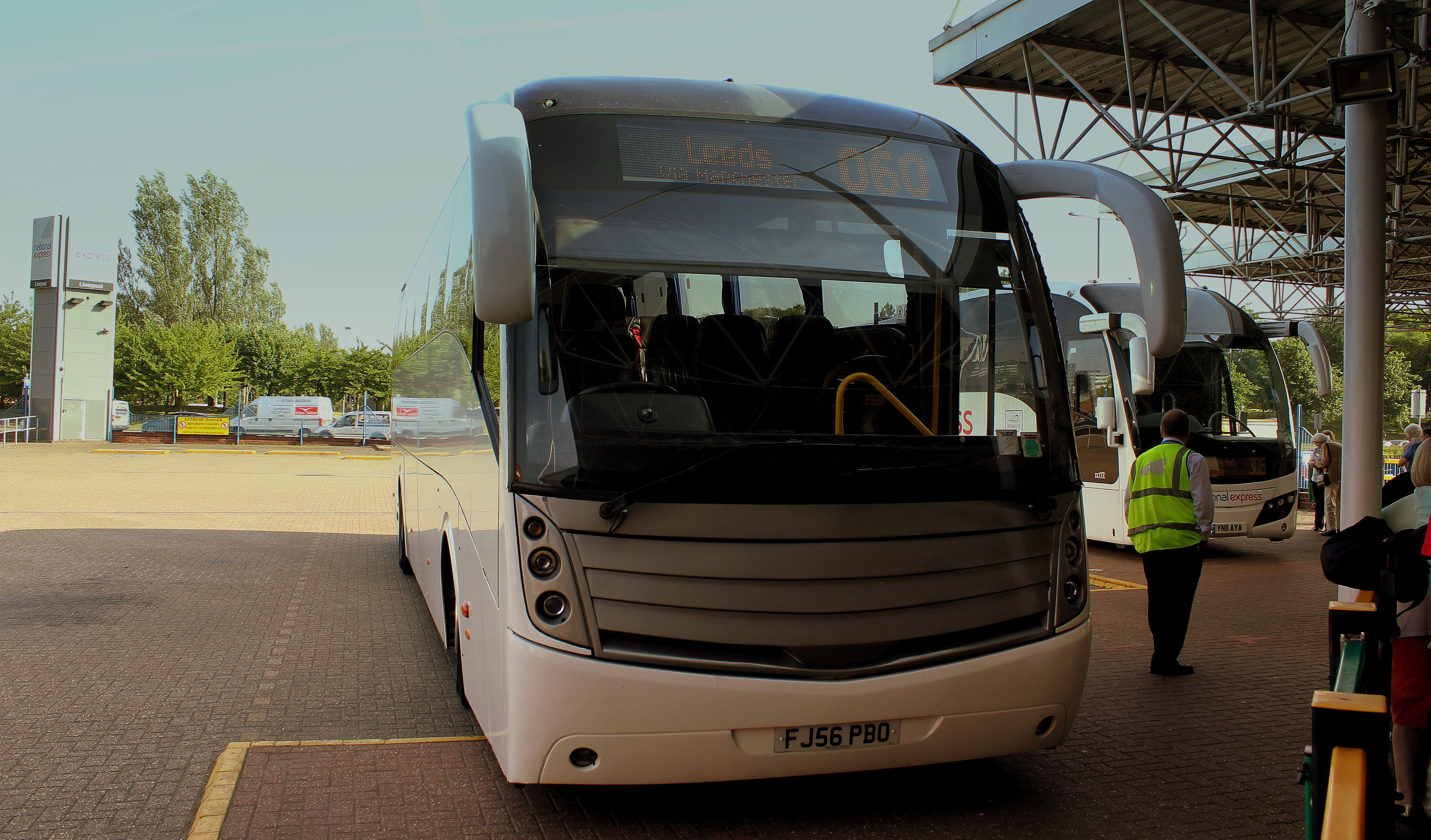
A 060 service to Leeds about to be boarded for departure
