= Ella Mae Morse =

American singer (1924–1999)

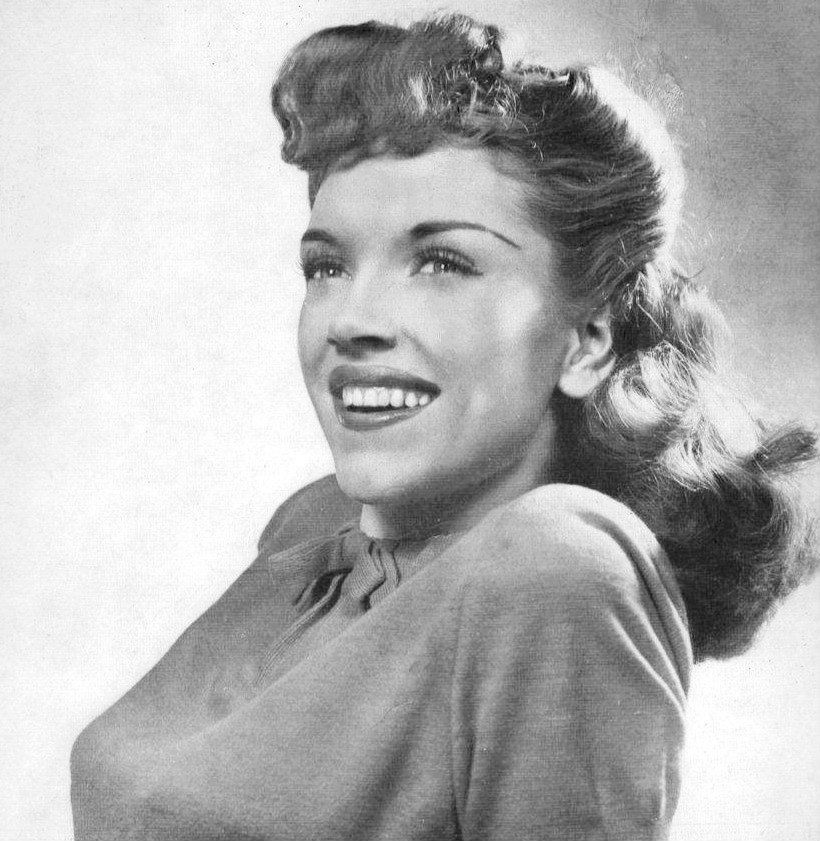
- Morse in 1944

Background information
- Born: September 12, 1924; Mansfield, Texas, U.S.
- Died: October 16, 1999 (aged 75) Bullhead City, Arizona, U.S.
- Genres: Popular music; Jump blues
- Occupation: Singer
- Years active: 1940s–1990s
- Label: Capitol

Ella Mae Morse (September 12, 1924 – October 16, 1999) was an American singer of popular music whose 1940s and 1950s recordings mixing jazz, blues, and country styles influenced the development of rock and roll. Her 1942 recording of "Cow-Cow Boogie" with Freddie Slack and His Orchestra gave Capitol Records its first gold record. In 1943, her single "Get On Board, Little Chillun", also with Slack, charted in what would soon become the R&B charts, making her one of the first white singers to do so. Morse stopped recording in 1957 but continued to perform and tour into the 1990s. In 1960, she received a star on the Hollywood Walk of Fame.

== Career ==
Morse was born in Mansfield, Texas. She was hired by Jimmy Dorsey when she was 14 years old. In 1942, at the age of 17, she joined Freddie Slack's band, with whom, that same year she recorded "Cow-Cow Boogie (Cuma-Ti-Yi-Yi-Ay)", the first gold record released by Capitol Records. "Mr. Five by Five" was also recorded by Morse with Slack, and became a hit record in 1942 (Capitol 115). She also originated the wartime hit "Milkman, Keep Those Bottles Quiet", which was later popularized by Nancy Walker in the 1944 film Broadway Rhythm.

In 1943, Morse began to record solo. She reached #1 in the R&B chart with "Shoo-Shoo Baby" in December for two weeks. In the same year she performed "Cow Cow Boogie" in the film Reveille with Beverly and co-starred in Universal's South of Dixie, Ghost Catchers with Olsen and Johnson, and How Do You Dooo?, a vehicle for radio's "Mad Russian", Bert Gordon. She sang in a wide variety of styles, and she had hits on both the U.S. pop and rhythm and blues charts. However, she never received the popularity of a major star.

The song "Love Me or Leave Me" as recorded by Morse was released by Capitol Records as catalog number 1922, with the flip side "Blacksmith Blues", which became her biggest hit.

In 1946, "House of Blue Lights" by Freddie Slack and Morse, (written by Slack and Don Raye) saw them perform what was one of many of Raye's songs picked up by black R&B artists. Her biggest solo success was "Blacksmith Blues" in 1952, which sold over one million copies, and was awarded a gold disc. The same year her version of "Down the Road a Piece" appeared on Capitol with Slack again on piano accompaniment. Morse also recorded a version of "Oakie Boogie" for Capitol which reached #23 in 1952. Her version was one of the first songs arranged by Nelson Riddle.

Morse ceased recording in 1957, but continued performing until the early 1990s, under the new management of Alan Eichler, performing at such clubs as Michael's Pub in New York, Ye Little Club in Beverly Hills, the Hollywood Roosevelt Hotel's Cinegrill and the Vine St. Bar and Grill. She appeared regularly at Disneyland for several years with the Ray McKinley Orchestra, and did a successful tour of Australia shortly before her final illness.

Her music career was profiled in Nick Tosches' 1984 book, The Unsung Heroes of Rock 'N' Roll: The Birth of Rock in the Wild Years Before Elvis. She has a star on the Hollywood Walk of Fame at 1724 Vine Street.

Her entire recorded body of work was issued in a deluxe box set by Bear Family Records and a rare live performance, "Ella Mae Morse On Broadway", was released in 2011.

== Musical style ==
As Morse's musical style blended jazz, blues, and country, she has sometimes been called the first rock 'n' roll singer. A good example is her 1942 recording of the song "Get On Board, Little Chillun", which, with strong gospel, blues, boogie, and jive sounds, was a genuine precursor to the later rockabilly/rock 'n roll songs. Her records sold well to both Caucasian and African-American audiences. As she was not well known at the time of her first solo hits, many people assumed she was African-American because of her 'hip' vocal style and choice of material.

== Personal life ==
In 1999, Morse died of respiratory failure in Bullhead City, Arizona, at age 75. She had six children from four marriages, several grandchildren, great-grandchildren, and a sister, Flo Handy, who was also a singer.

== Discography ==
=== Albums as a leader ===
- Dynamite Texas Diva Live (1940s live recordings, released by Collectors Choice, 2003)
- Barrelhouse, Boogie and the Blues with Big Dave and his orchestra (Capitol Records, 1957)
- Morse Code (Capitol, 1957)

compilations:

- Morse Code Collection (Jasmine Records, 2005) (2 discs)
- Singles Collection, 1942-57 (Acrobat Records, 2018) (3 discs)
- Barrelhouse, Boogie and the Blues (Bear Family Records, 2006) (Complete recordings, 5 discs)
- Rocks (Bear Family Records, 2010)
- Very Best Of (Collectables, 1998)
- Two Classic Albums Plus Singles (Real Tyme Music, 2014) (4 discs)
- Ella Mae Morse, Collectors Series (Capitol, 2007
- Razzle Dazzle--In the 50's (Rev-ola Bandstand, 2007

=== Hit singles ===
Year	Single	US Chart position	Label	Catalogue No.
1942	"Cow-Cow Boogie"	9	Capitol	102
1942	"Mr. Five by Five"	10	Capitol	115
1943	"Get On Board Little Chillun"	17 (R&B)	Capitol	133
1943	"Shoo-Shoo Baby"	4	Capitol	143
1944	"No Love, No Nothin’"	4	Capitol	143
1944	"Tess' Torch Song"	11	Capitol	151
1944	"Milkman, Keep Those Bottles Quiet"	7	Capitol	151
1944	"The Patty Cake Man"	10	Capitol	163
1945	"Captain Kidd"	17	Capitol	193
1946	"Buzz Me"	15	Capitol	226
1946	"The House of Blue Lights"	8 (R&B)	Capitol	251
1952	"The Blacksmith Blues"	3	Capitol	1922
1952	"Oakie Boogie"	23	Capitol	2072
1953	"40 Cups of Coffee"	26	Capitol	2539

=== As a collaborator or side performer ===
- Ella Mae Morse and Freddie Slack, The Hits of Ella Mae Morse and Freddie Slack (Capitol, 1962)
- Herbie Mann, Ella Mae Morse, Jimmy Giuffre, Sessions, Live (Calliope, 1976)
- Red Norvo Quintet, With Guest Vocalists Mavis Rivers And Ella Mae Morse (United, 1962; released by Studio West, 1990)

== Filmography ==
- Reveille with Beverly (1943) – Herself
- The Sky's the Limit (1943) – Singer (uncredited)
- Ghost Catchers (1944) – Virginia Bennet
- South of Dixie (1944) – Barbara Ann Morgan
- How Doooo You Do (1945) – Singer
- Hit and Run (1957) – Singer

== See also ==
- List of jump blues musicians
- List of artists who reached number one on the Billboard R&B chart
- First rock and roll record
