= (How Much Is) That Doggie in the Window? =

1952 single by Patti Page

Single by Patti Page
- B-side: "My Jealous Eyes"
- Released: January 1953 (US); March 28, 1953 (UK)
- Recorded: December 18, 1952 with "Barks by Joe and Mac"
- Genre: Novelty, traditional pop
- Length: 2:58
- Label: Mercury (US); Oriole (UK)
- Songwriter: Bob Merrill

Patti Page singles chronology
| "Conquest" (1952) | "(How Much Is) That Doggie in the Window?" / "My Jealous Eyes" (1953) | "Now That I'm in Love" (1953) |

"(How Much Is) That Doggie in the Window?" is a popular novelty song written by Bob Merrill and first registered on September 25, 1952, as "The Doggie in the Window". On January 27, 1953, its sheet music was published in New York as "(How Much Is) That Doggie in the Window".

The best-known version of the song was the original, recorded by Patti Page on December 18, 1952, and released in January 1953 by Mercury Records as catalog numbers 70070 (78 rpm) and 70070X45 (45 rpm) under the title "The Doggie in the Window", with the flip side being "My Jealous Eyes". It reached No. 1 on both the Billboard and Cash Box charts in 1953 and sold over two million copies. Mercury, however, had poor distribution in the United Kingdom and, for that reason, a recording by Lita Roza was the one most widely heard in that country, reaching No. 1 on the UK Singles Chart in 1953, making Roza the first British woman to have a No. 1 hit on the UK charts. It was also the first song with a question in the title to reach the top spot.

== Patti Page recording ==
=== Background ===
"Doggie" was one in a series of successful novelty songs since the 1930s, following on the success of songs such as Bing Crosby's "Pistol Packin' Mama" and Merv Griffin's "I've Got a Lovely Bunch of Coconuts". Prior to the release of "Doggie", composer Bob Merrill penned "If I Knew You Were Comin' I'd've Baked a Cake". The original Page recording included the sounds of dogs barking, credited on the label as "Barks by Joe and Mac" (her arranger, Joe Reisman, and a violinist). The recording also features Page's signature multi-part tight harmonies, all sung by Page. Over the course of her career, she also recorded several other versions.

=== Popular reception ===
On April 4, 1953, singer Patti Page's rendition of "The Doggie in the Window" went to No. 1 in the US Billboard magazine chart, staying at that top spot for eight weeks. The song was wildly popular across a wide demographic. The song had school children "yipping", Mercury Records was besieged with requests for free puppies, and the American Kennel Club's annual registrations spiked by eight percent. In all, Page's record sold over 2 million copies. It was the third best-selling song of 1953.

Following the UK top ten debut of Lita Roza's cover version on March 19, 1953, the Patti Page version of the song was released in the UK on March 28, renamed "(How Much Is) That Doggie in the Window" (sans question mark), under Mercury's Oriole Records label. Given the delay getting to market in the UK, it was not as successful as the Roza version, entering the charts at No. 9 on April 2, before leaving the charts altogether five weeks later. The Roza version reached No. 1 on April 23, where it stayed for a single week. For five weeks between March 28, 1953, and April 25, 1953, there were two versions of "Doggie" in the UK's Top 12 singles chart.

==== Charts ====
| Chart (1953) | Peak position |
|---|---|
| Australian Singles Chart | 1 |
| Radio Luxembourg Sheet Music Chart | 1 |
| UK Singles Chart | 9 |
| US Billboard Best Sellers in Stores | 1 |

=== Legacy ===
According to rock historian Michael Uslan, "novelty songs" like "Doggie" led to the "fervent embrace of rock & roll" by 1955. "A lot of songs at that time were extremely bland, squeaky-clean stuff. The music field was ripe for something new, something vibrant to shake the rafters."

The song has since become a popular children's song. Bob Merrill's lyrics were reworked by Iza Trapani into her 2004 children's book, How Much Is That Doggie in the Window?.

In 2009, Page recorded a version of the song with a new title ("Do You See That Doggie in the Shelter") together with new lyrics by Chris Gantry, with the hopes of emphasizing the adoption of homeless animals from animal shelters. The rights to that song were given exclusively to the Humane Society of the United States. Said Page:

"The original song asks the question: 'How much is that doggie in the window?' Today, the answer is 'too much.' And I don't just mean the price tag on the puppies in pet stores. The real cost is in the suffering of the mother dogs back at the puppy mill. That's where most pet store puppies come from. And that kind of cruelty is too high a price to pay."

— Patti Page, 2009

Upon Page's death in 2013, the Humane Society wrote in its online eulogy, "We remember her fondly for her compassion for animals."

The song, and Page's version in particular, gained some notoriety for its use in the infamous final scene of John Waters' 1972 film Pink Flamingos.

A season five episode of Cold Case, "Devil's Music", used Patti Page's recording in the opening.

An instrumental electric organ version of the song plays in the 1993 Wallace & Gromit short film, The Wrong Trousers.

Creative director Ken Levine commented on the use of the song in 2007 video game BioShock as choosing "the sort of crap pop of the time, what we consider pop music, like Patti Page, which holds up more for its nostalgic value than for being great music." He also remarked that the story of BioShock is "a sad story – not a horror story" and "we counterpoint it with [Patti Page's] '(How Much Is) that Doggie in the Window'". However, due to licensing restrictions, Levine noted they had to use "another version of the recording": the game does not use Page's original 1952 overdubbed Mercury recording and instead uses her 1966 re-recording with full orchestra for Columbia Records.

== Cover versions ==
=== Lita Roza version ===
"(How Much is) That Doggie in the Window"

Single by Lita Roza (Accompaniment directed by Johnny Douglas)
- B-side: "Tell Me We'll Meet Again"
- Published: January 27, 1953
- Released: March 1953
- Recorded: 18 February 1953
- Genre: Novelty, traditional pop
- Length: 2:21
- Label: Decca Records
- Songwriter: Bob Merrill
- Producer: Dick Rowe

==== Background ====
Roza was a singer with the Ted Heath jazz band in the 1950s. During this period, she was voted Favourite Female Vocalist in a Melody Maker poll from 1951 to 1955 and in a similar New Musical Express poll from 1952 to 1955.

In 1951, Roza recorded "Allentown Jail" with the Heath Band, which led to her A&R man Dick Rowe asking her to sing "(How Much is) That Doggie in the Window". Her initial response was negative: "I'm not recording that; it's rubbish." She recalled that he pleaded with her, responding, "It'll be a big hit; please do it, Lita." She relented, saying she would record it but never sing it again afterwards. Roza's version was recorded on February 18, 1953, with accompaniment directed by Johnny Douglas.

==== Reception ====
"(How Much is) That Doggie in the Window" was a new entry in the UK charts on March 14, 1953, at No. 9. It moved up to No. 3 in its second and third week of release before dropping down to No. 4 on April 4. On April 11, it moved up to No. 2 for a week, before reaching No. 1 on April 18. This made Lita Roza both the first female vocalist to top the UK singles chart and the first artist from Liverpool to do so, long before the success of The Beatles or Cilla Black in the 1960s. Roza held the top spot for one week, before gradually dropping down the top ten over the next five weeks, with its final week in the top ten being at No. 9 on May 23.

=== Other contemporary versions ===
Record sales in the UK were not a threat to the sheet music charts, broadcast on Radio Luxembourg, until around 1955. It is thought that the last sheet music million sellers were in 1953, and it has been suggested that "(How Much is) That Doggie in the Window" was the final title to reach this figure. The song entered the sheet music charts on February 28, 1953, and peaked at No. 1 on March 28, its fifth week on the chart, staying there for six weeks in total. No recordings were commercially available until after the song had entered the sheet music charts, with several versions issued in March 1953: these were by Lita Roza, Patti Page, Carole Carr with Children's Choir and Rustler the Dog, and British actor John Slater. The following month, a version by the British child star Mandy Miller, who was aged just 8, was released. A parody version by American country music duo Homer and Jethro (titled "That Hound Dog in the Window") was released in November in the UK after the song had left the charts. In May 1954, the UK branch of Mercury re-issued Page's recording. The company had taken over distribution of American Mercury's repertoire from Oriole, who had originally released the Page version in the UK.

==== Charts ====
| Chart (1953) | Peak position |
|---|---|
| Radio Luxembourg Sheet Music Chart | 1 |
| UK Singles Chart | 1 |

==== Legacy ====
Lita Roza was widely reported to have strongly disliked her song. In an interview in 2004, she revealed that she had kept her promise never to perform the song: "I sang it once, just one take, and vowed I would never sing it again. When it reached number one, there was enormous pressure to perform it, but I always refused. It just wasn't my style." However, she would go on to be most widely remembered for that song. In 2001, Roza opened Liverpool's Wall of Hits on Mathew Street, home of The Cavern Club. On display were various discs from every British number-one from Merseyside, the first being her own.

The song returned to the spotlight briefly during the 1980s as the result of an interview with Smash Hits magazine, wherein Margaret Thatcher, who was then serving as Prime Minister of the United Kingdom, admitted that Lita Roza's version of "Doggie" was her favourite song of all time.

Following Roza's death in August 2008, she left £300,000 in her will to charities, of which £190,000 went to three dog-related charities: Battersea Dogs and Cats Home, The Guide Dogs for the Blind Association, and The Cinnamon Trust.

=== Parodies ===
The song has also been parodied a few times, including:

- In 1953, the year of the original's release, country musicians Homer & Jethro, "the thinking man's hillbillies," released their parody, "How Much Is That Hound Dog in the Window?" ("Window" was pronounced "winder", and the lyrics continued with, "... I do hope that flea bag's for sale....") It was to become an enormous hit – their first crossover hit – and rose to No. 2 on Billboard's country charts. It also made number 17 on the Billboard Hot 100.
- A Yiddish version by Mickey Katz entitled "(How Much Is) That Pickle in the Window" was released when the song was first popular in 1953.
- Another notable (but hardly known) parody, according to David English, former president of RSO Records – which went on to become Eric Clapton's and the Bee Gees' record label – was the very first record released by that company in 1973, with Tim Rice and Andrew Lloyd Webber. The record was "Window The In Doggie (That is Much How)" – sung to the tune of "Doggie", but with each line of lyrics sung backwards. According to the pseudonyms listed on the label, the artist was "Rover", the song was produced by "Jo Rice", and it was arranged by "Don Gould". English would later quip that the record "sold about eight copies".
- "How much is that window in the doggie?" was written by the quadriplegic cartoonist John Callahan. A pane of glass falls from a building and slices into a man's seeing-eye dog. A child observer asks the inverted question. Callahan's cartoons often dealt with taboo subjects.
- An adapted version of the song is also one of the 27 demo songs played on the Meowsic Interactive Cat Piano made by B. Toys.

== See also ==
- List of number-one singles in Australia during the 1950s
- List of number-one singles from the 1950s (UK)
- List of number-one singles of 1953 (U.S.)
