= The Blacksmith Blues =

Single by Ella Mae Morse
- B-side: "Love Me or Leave Me"
- Released: January 1952
- Recorded: December 1951
- Studio: Capitol Records studio, Hollywood, California
- Genre: Traditional pop
- Length: 3:05
- Label: Capitol
- Songwriter(s): Jack Holmes

Ella Mae Morse singles chronology
"The House of Blue Lights" (1951)	"The Blacksmith Blues" (1952)	"Oakie Boogie" (1952)

"The Blacksmith Blues" is a song which was written for Ella Mae Morse by Jack Holmes. The recording reached #3 on the Billboard chart when it was released in 1952, and sold over a million copies. Recordings were later made by Bing Crosby, the John Barry Seven, and others. Harry James released a recording on Columbia 39671 with Toni Harper on vocals.

== Original recording ==
Morse recorded the song on December 12, 1951, in the Capitol Records studio on Melrose Avenue in Hollywood. The arrangement was created by Billy May and Nelson Riddle, and the recording was produced by Lee Gillette. Bob Bain played a muffled ashtray with a triangle beater to create the hammer and anvil sound effect. The recording was originally issued as the B-side of "Love Me or Leave Me".

== Origins of the song ==
The tune had first been copyrighted by Holmes in 1950, when it was recorded, with completely different lyrics, as "Happy Pay-Off Day". Its first recording was by Mickey Katz, and it was also recorded by Little Willie Littlefield (as "Happy Pay Day"), and Sonny Burke. However, none of the recordings were hits. Over a year later, music publisher Del Evans remembered the tune, had Holmes write a new set of lyrics, and had it recorded by Ella Mae Morse.

== Copyright claims ==
A legal dispute arose in 1952 when Ken Watkins of Lynda Music, who originally held the copyright to "Happy Pay-Off Day", sued music publishers Hill & Range, to whom he had sold the rights. The dispute was over whether Hill & Range needed to pay royalties to Lynda Music for the rewritten song. The case eventually collapsed after Watkins failed to attend the court.

In a separate dispute in 1959, Mrs Mildred Schultz sued for breach of copyright, claiming that the music was a copy of her 1941 composition "Good Old Army", which she had rewritten in 1949 as "Waitin' For My Baby" but never published or recorded. The suit was unsuccessful.
