= You Were Mine (The Fireflies song) =

Single by The Fireflies
- B-side: "Stella Got a Fella"
- Released: June 1959
- Recorded: 1959
- Genre: Doo-wop
- Length: 1:52
- Label: Ribbon
- Songwriter: Paul Giacalone

The Fireflies singles chronology
"The Crawl" (1958)	"You Were Mine" (1959)	"I Can't Say Goodbye" (1959)

"You Were Mine" is a song written and recorded in 1959 by Paul Giacalone and performed by American doo-wop group The Fireflies.

"You Were Mine" was written by 19-year-old Giacalone about a girl he met while he was touring. It spent 16 weeks on the Billboard Hot 100, and peaked at #21 on October 26, 1959, while reaching #15 on Canada's CHUM Hit Parade.

== Charts ==
Chart (1959)	Peak position
US Billboard Hot 100	21
