= Liverpool One bus station =

Bus station in Liverpool, England

Liverpool One
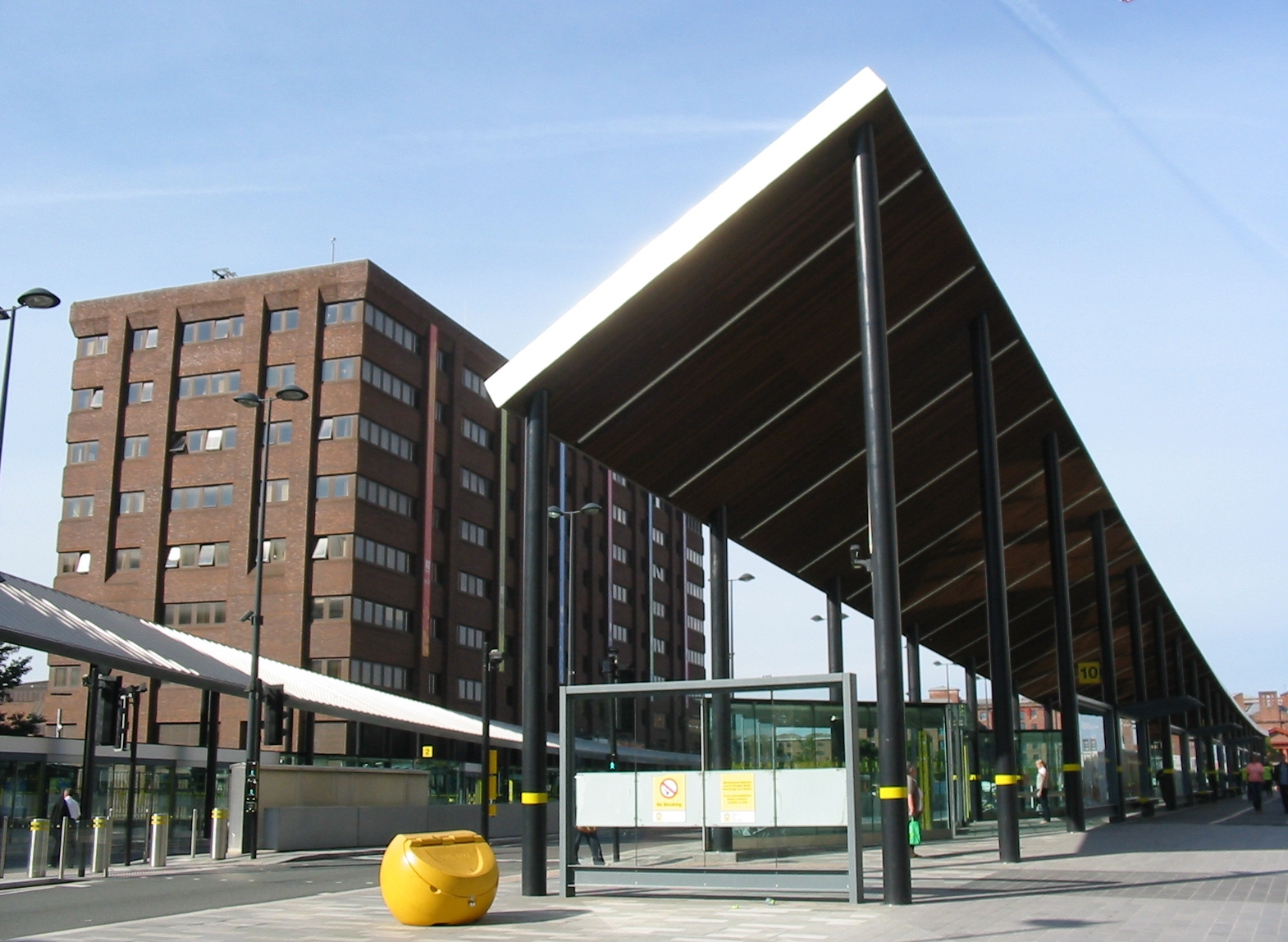

General information
- Location: Canning Place, Liverpool
- Coordinates: 53.402°N 2.988°W
- Operator: Merseytravel; National Express
- Bus stands: 10
- Bus operators: Bus: Arriva North West; Stagecoach Merseyside and South Lancashire; Stagecoach Cumbria and North Lancashire; Cumfybus; Peoplesbus; Coach: FlixBus; National Express
Location

Liverpool One bus station is located in Canning Place, Liverpool, England. Formerly known as the Paradise Street interchange, it was situated on Paradise Street close to Lord Street with access from the nearby Liverpool One shopping centre. It was re-built in November 2005 as part of the Liverpool Paradise Street re-development, and rebranded in September 2009.

In 2016, National Express relocated their coach services to Liverpool One Bus Station from the former Liverpool Coach Station on Norton Street. All ticket bookings and coach travel information are now provided in the Travel Centre at Liverpool One Bus Station.

== Layout ==
There are ten bays within the bus station as well as a crew depot. Each stand has electronic timetabled (non-real time) departure boards. The travel centre sells multi-journey tickets and provides information.
