= Liverpool Beatles Museum =

Museum dedicated to the Beatles, situated in Mathew Street, Liverpool, England

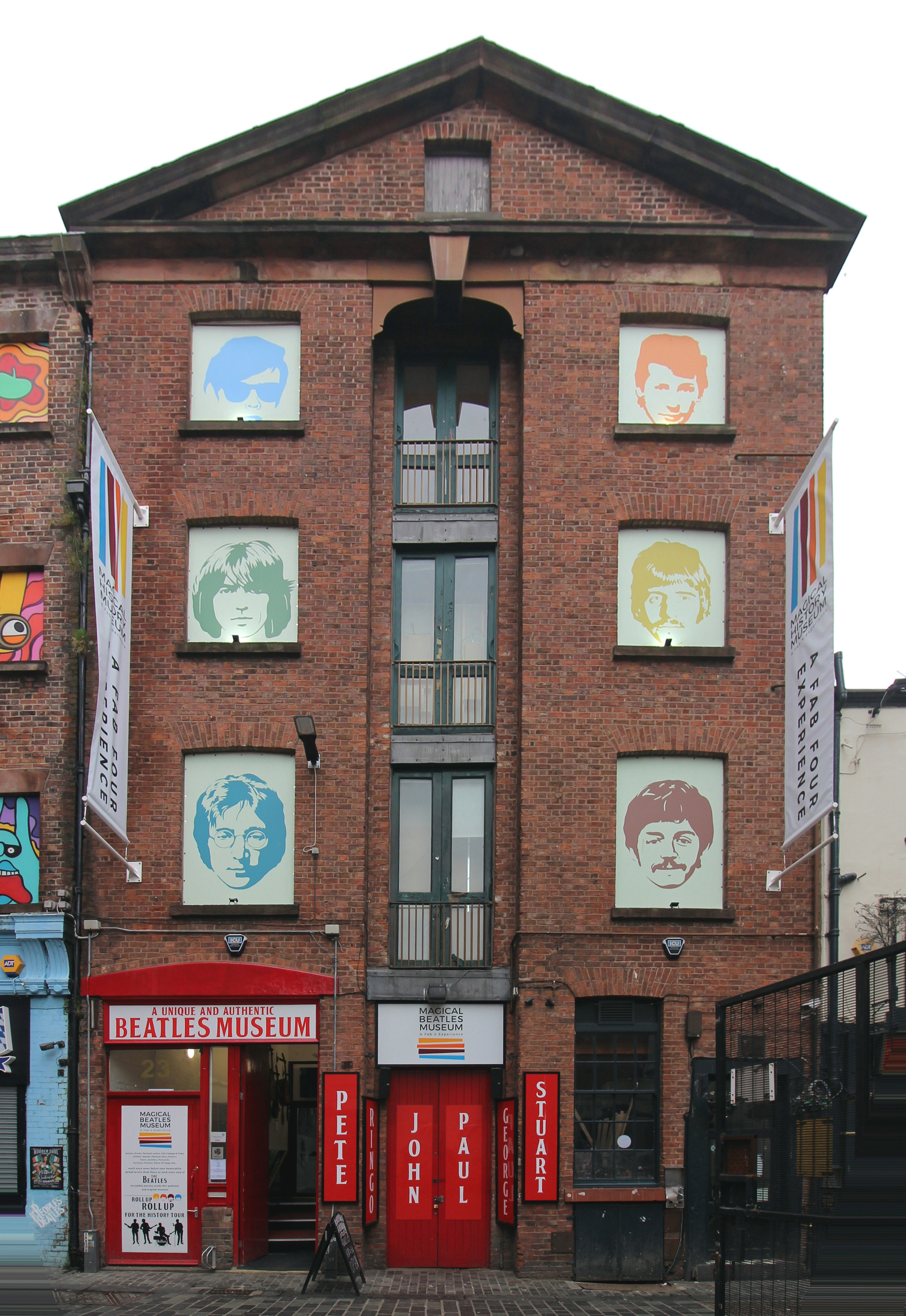
- The museum exterior
- Former name: Magical Beatles Museum
- Established: 13 July 2018
- Location: 23 Mathew Street Liverpool, England
- Coordinates: 53.4064°N 2.9872°W
- Owners: Roag Best & 5 partners
- Public transit access: Whitechapel bus stop 3, Moorfields railway station
- Website: liverpoolbeatlesmuseum.com

Liverpool Beatles Museum, formerly known as Magical Beatles Museum, is a museum dedicated to the Beatles located in 23 Mathew Street, Liverpool. The museum was created by Roag Best, son of Neil Aspinall and Mona Best, half-brother of Pete Best. It was inaugurated on 13 July 2018.

== Collections ==
The museum displays 300 original items, with an further 1,200 being kept in storage. It is located in a five-floor building, with three of the floors dedicated to a different period in the Beatles history each. The first floor covers 1959–1962, while the second covers 1963–1966 and the third floor covers 1967–1970.

Objects displayed include George Harrison's Futurama guitar, John Lennon's Sergeant Pepper medals, the cello from "I Am the Walrus" and Pete Best's Premier drum. Other items displayed are Paul McCartney's bass speaker, Lennon's custom-made egg chair, and police log books listing the names of the officers who guarded the Beatles during their visit of New York City, the "All You Need Is Love" doll from the BBC Our World broadcast, and gifts that Elvis Presley gave to the Beatles.

There are photos of a number of celebrity visitors to the museum, including Noddy Holder, Nick Mason, Billy Bob Thornton, Tim Rice and Craig Charles, amongst others.

In 2020 a new mural was unveiled by Pete Best at the museum.

The building was formerly a warehouse dating from the early 19th century and is a Grade II listed building by the English Heritage. It is located close to the famous Cavern Club, where the Beatles regularly performed.

== See also ==
- Cavern Mecca
- List of music museums
