= Cavern Mecca =

Former museum in Liverpool, England

Coordinates: 53°24′22.97″N 2°59′12.49″W

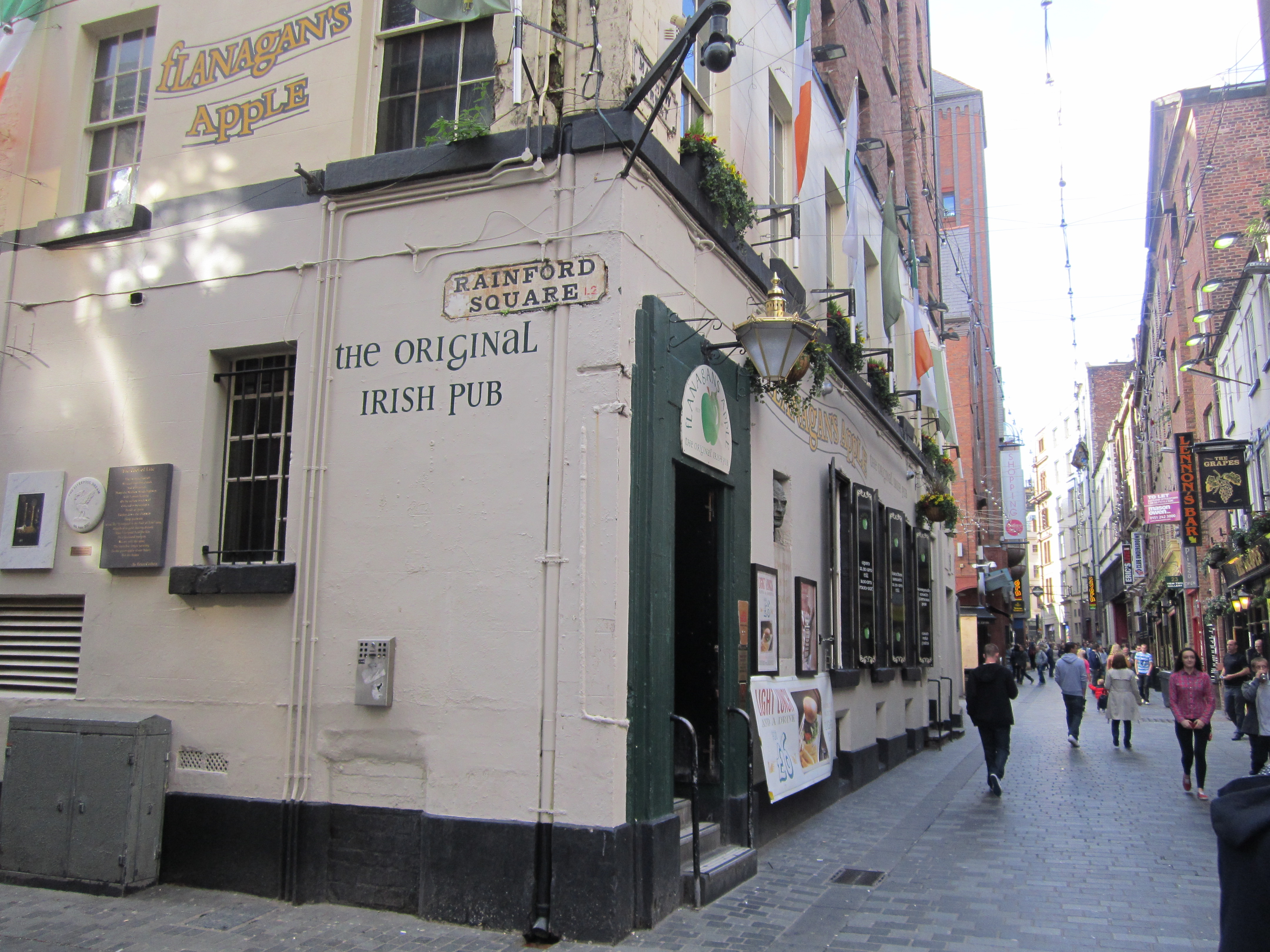
The building where the Cavern Mecca was once located

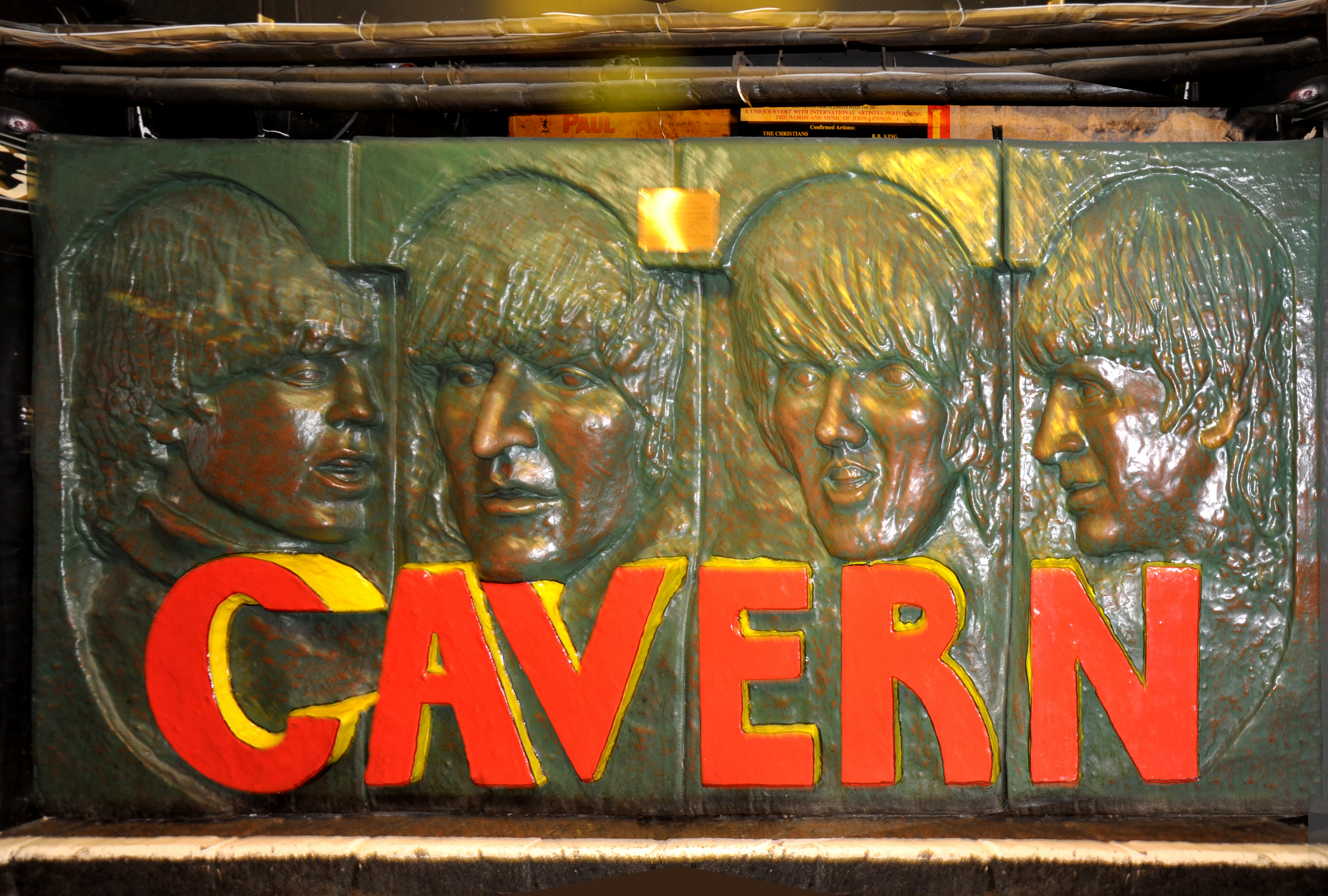
Beatles relief once exhibited at Cavern Mecca (now exhibited at Cavern Club)

The Cavern Mecca was a Beatles museum in Liverpool. Founded in 1981 and named for the Cavern Club, it was instrumental in the birth of Beatles fan-based tourism in Liverpool. It was located on the corner of Rainford Square and Mathew Street.

== History ==
The museum was founded and run by Liz and Jim Hughes, who "single-handedly jump-started" what became the annual Beatles Convention in Liverpool, now part of the Beatles Week festival. When the museum and fan club were founded, the Beatles had been out of fashion and little acknowledged in Liverpool.

The Cavern Club itself, where the Beatles had frequently played in their early years after returning from Hamburg, was closed in 1973 and later filled in as part of construction of the Merseyrail underground rail loop. In the same year as the opening of the Cavern Mecca, plans were announced to excavate and reopen the Cavern Club. The Cavern Club, complete with excavation of the original club, remained open from 1984 to 1989 before again closing, only to re-open again in 1991 as both a club and museum. The Cavern Mecca closed in December 1984 when founder Liz Hughes fell ill. Co-founder Jim Hughes died in 2018.

In 2003, a signed copy of the Beatles album Sgt. Pepper's Lonely Hearts Club Band, together with an official souvenir programme from the fourth annual Beatles Convention of Cavern Mecca, sold for $290,000 at auction, breaking the record at the time for the price of a signed Beatles album cover.

== See also ==
- The Beatles Story
- Liverpool Beatles Museum
- List of music museums

== Bibliography ==
- "Cavern Mecca". CavernMecca.co.uk. Archived from the original on 11 September 2011.
- Philip Battle (January 1982). "The other side of the coin…..A tribute to John Lennon and an interview with Jim Hughes (Manager of the Cavern Mecca and organiser of John Lennon Statue Appeal Fund)". Breakout (6): 22–23.
