= Oakie Boogie =

Single by Jack Guthrie
- B-side: "The Clouds Rained Trouble Down"
- Released: 1947
- Recorded: 1947
- Genre: Western swing
- Length: 2:25
- Label: Capitol
- Songwriter(s): Johnny Tyler

Jack Guthrie singles chronology
"I'm Tellin' You" (1946)	"Oakie Boogie" (1947)	"You Laughed and I Cried" (1947)

"Oakie Boogie" (sometimes "Okie Boogie") is a Western swing dance song written by Johnny Tyler in 1947. It is recognizable by its refrain:

When you do the Oakie Boogie, and do it Oklahoma style,
That mean old Oakie Boogie is bound to drive you wild.

Jack Guthrie's version (Capitol 341) reached number three on the charts in 1947 and is often included in the list of the first rock and roll songs. The singing of "Oakie Boogie" is the only performance by Guthrie in a film—Ernest Tubb's Hollywood Barn Dance in 1947.

Ella Mae Morse also recorded a version for Capitol which reached number 23 in 1952. Her version was one of the first songs arranged by Nelson Riddle. Speedy West played pedal steel guitar on the recording.

The song has been recorded by many artists over the years.

== Bibliography ==
- Levinson, Peter. September in the Rain: The Life of Nelson Riddle. Billboard Books, 2001. ISBN 0-8230-7672-5
- Lonergan, David F. Hit Records, 1950-1975. Scarecrow Press, 2004. ISBN 0-8108-5129-6
- Pugh, Ronnie. Ernest Tubb: The Texas Troubadour. Duke University Press, 1996. ISBN 0-8223-2190-4
- Whitburn, Joel. The Billboard Book of Top 40 Country Hits. Billboard Books, 2006. ISBN 0-8230-8291-1
