= Mathew Street =

Street in Liverpool, England

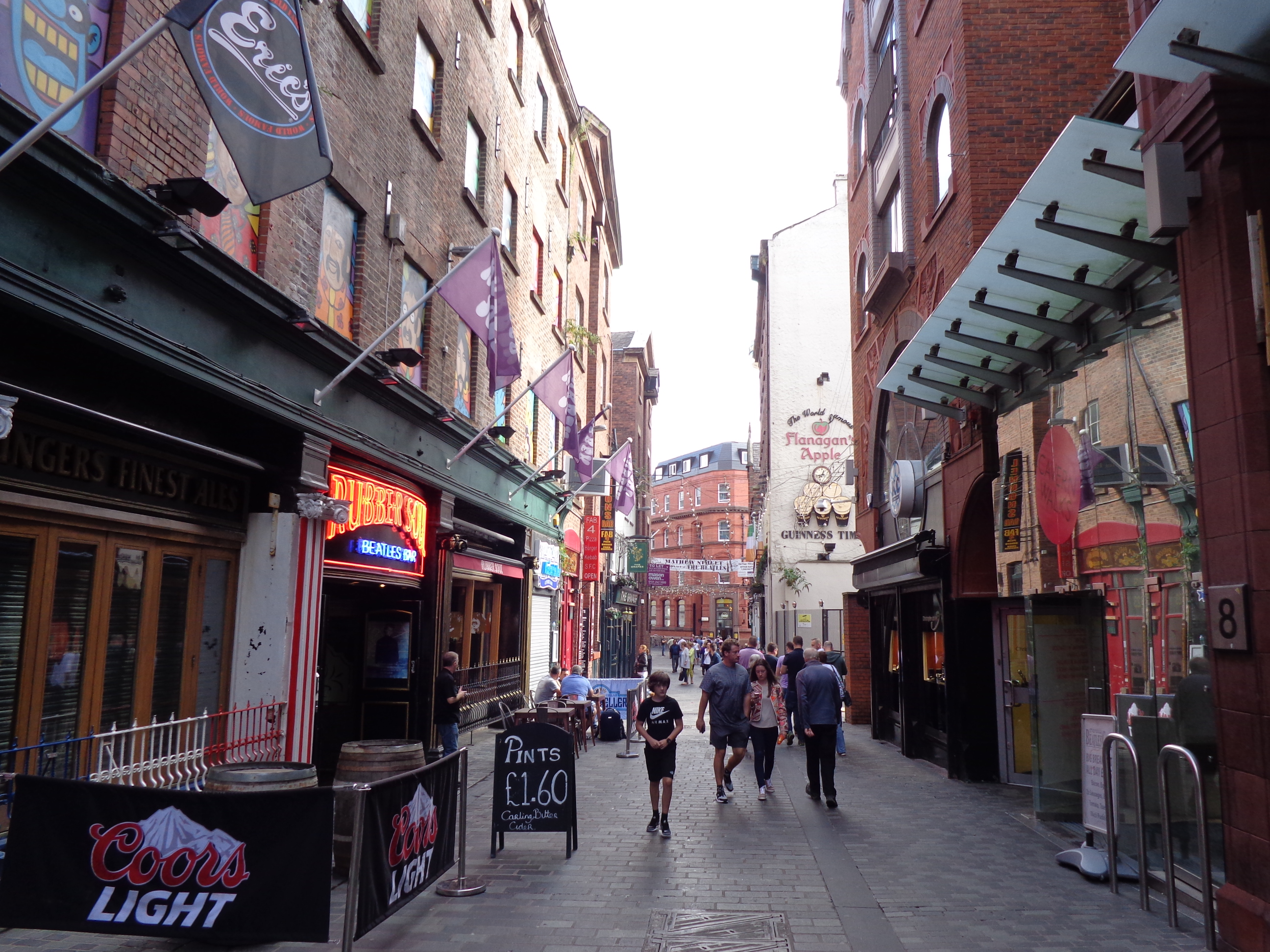
- Mathew Street, 2016

- Location within Liverpool
- Location: Liverpool
- Postal code: L2
- Coordinates: 53.40600°N 2.98700°W

Other
- Known for: Cavern Club; Mathew Street Festival

Mathew Street is a street in Liverpool, England, notable as the location of the new Cavern Club, the Beatles having played in the original club on numerous occasions in their early career.

Mathew Street is visited by thousands of tourists a year, who visit the Cavern Club and many surrounding attractions including a statue of John Lennon, a Beatles store, the Liverpool Beatles Museum and several pubs formerly frequented by the band. A wall in Mathew Street is adorned by a sculpture by Arthur Dooley entitled "Four Lads Who Shook the World".

== Location ==
The street connects Rainford Gardens (off Whitechapel) to North John Street, and is located in an area of the city centre known today as "The Cavern Quarter". Historically it was the centre of Liverpool's wholesale fruit and vegetable market.

== History ==
The street was originally named Mathew Pluckington Street, after a famous Liverpool merchant.

It was also home to the influential music club Eric's, which played host to many famous punk and post-punk bands from its opening in 1976, despite only being open for four years.

The fame of Mathew Street led to the arrest of three men in 2006 when an American in Dallas, Texas, viewing the street's webcam, saw a burglary in progress and called Merseyside Police.

The psychoanalyst Carl Jung is often cited as visiting Liverpool in 1927, but he only recorded a dream in which he had, later published in Jung's autobiography Memories, Dreams, Reflections of which he wrote

"Liverpool is the pool of life, it makes to live."

As a result, a statue of Jung was erected in Mathew Street in 1987, but being made of plaster, was vandalised and replaced by a more durable version in 1993.

Today, Mathew Street is one of Liverpool's most popular nightlife destinations.

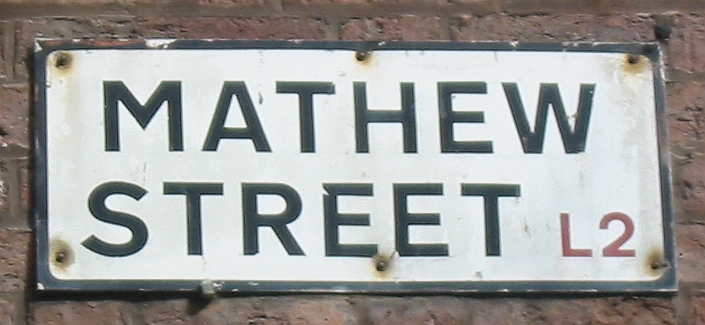
Mathew Street sign

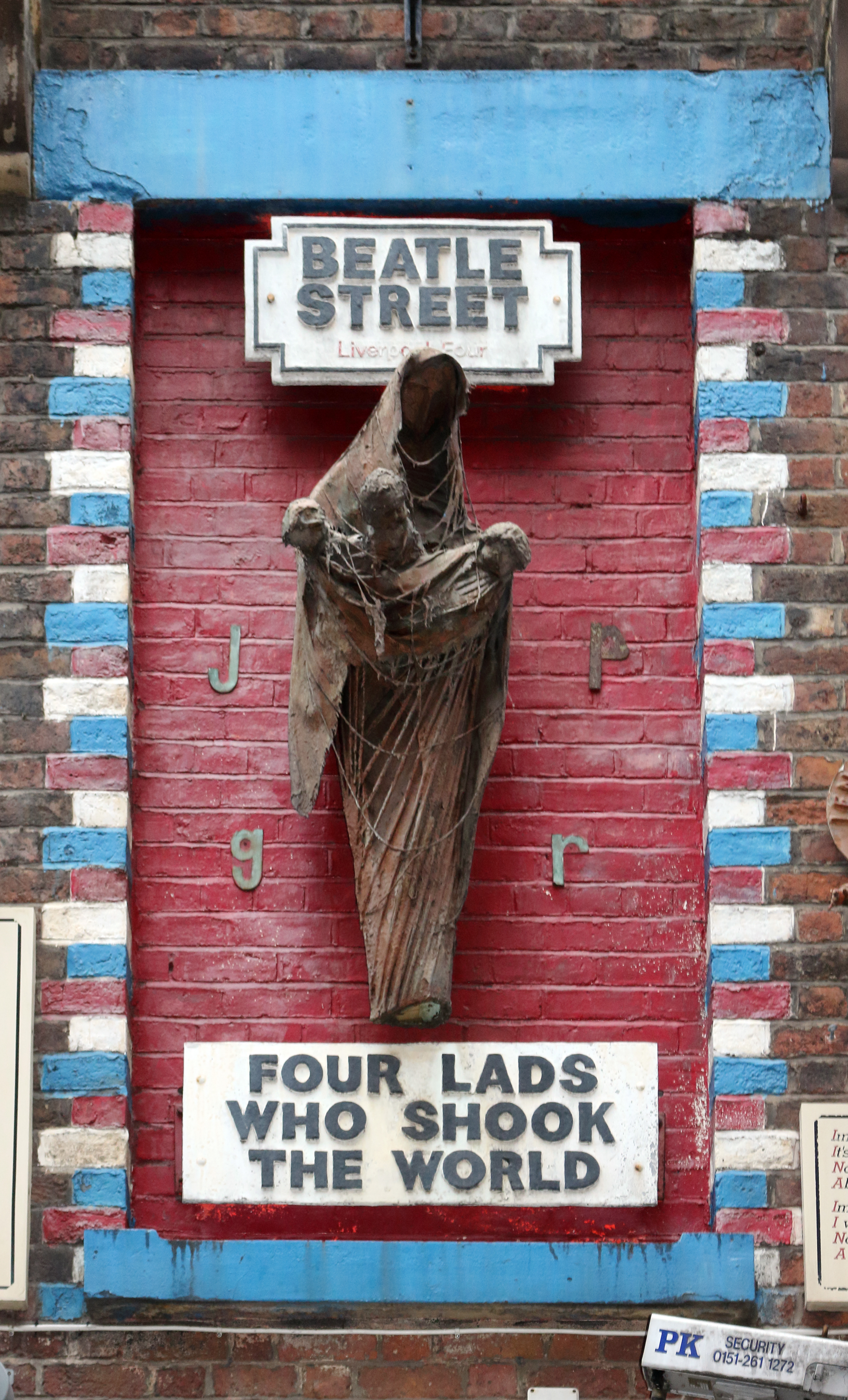
Mural tribute sculpture to the Beatles by Arthur Dooley

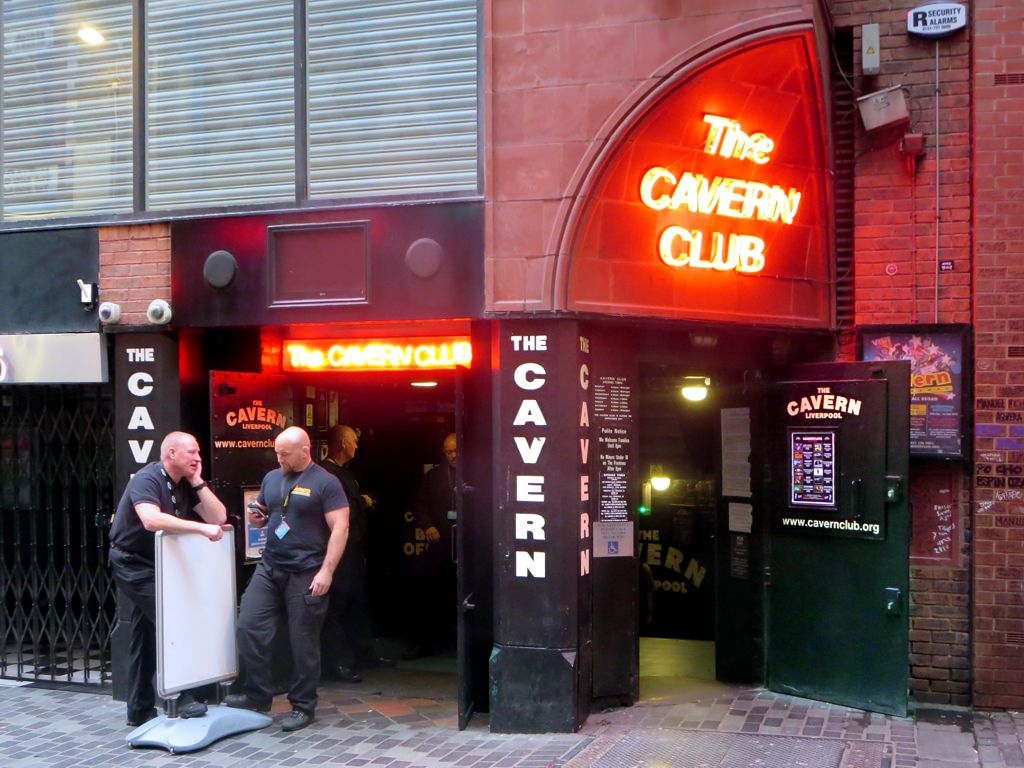
The Cavern Club on Mathew Street

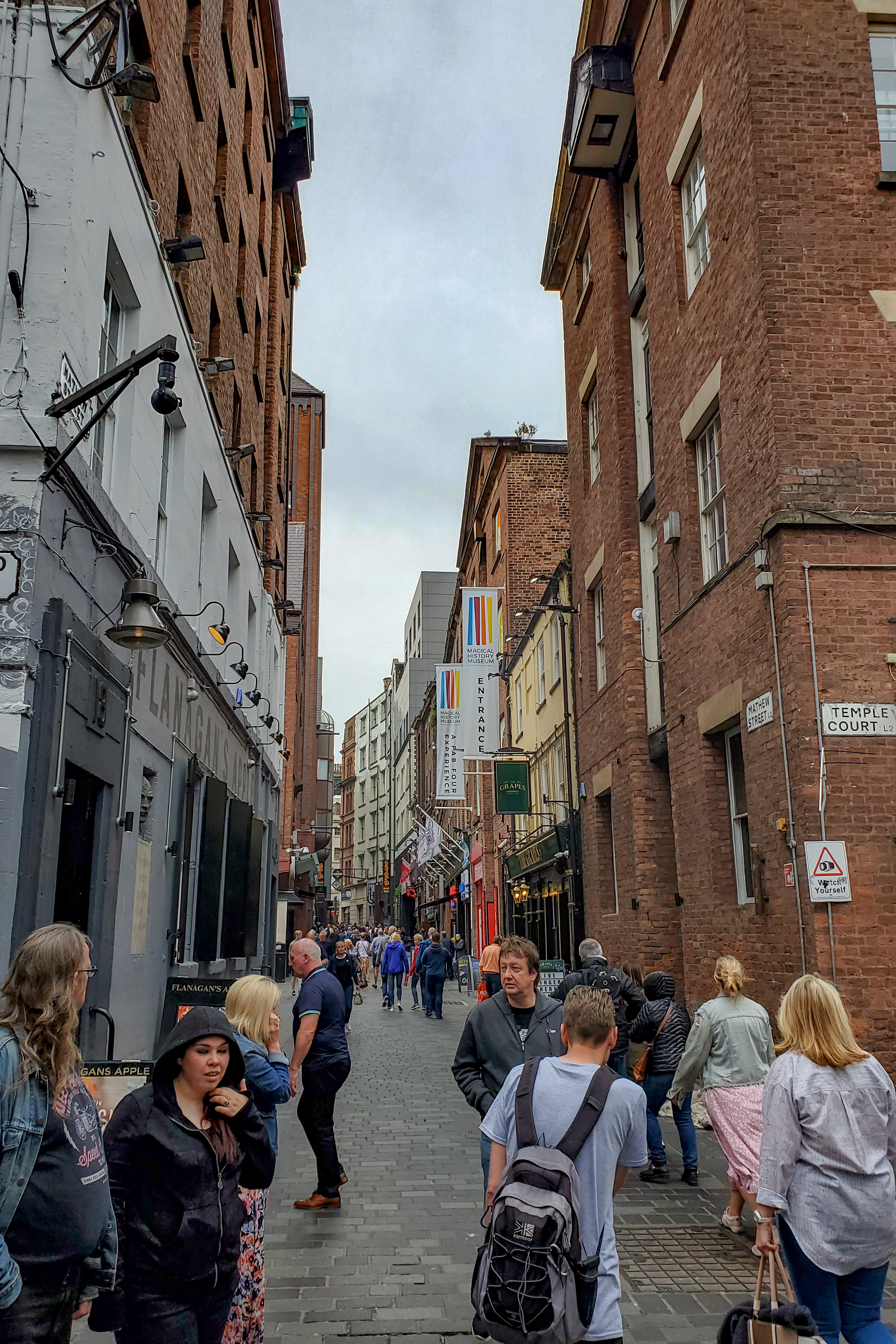
Corner of Mathew Street and Temple Court

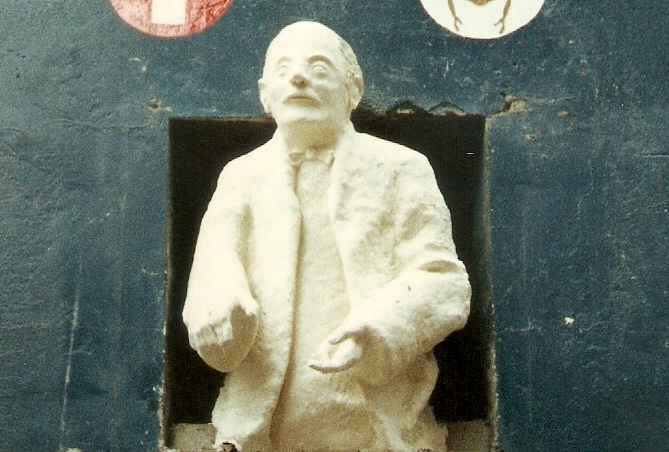
Statue of Carl Jung, based on his quote "Liverpool is the pool of life"

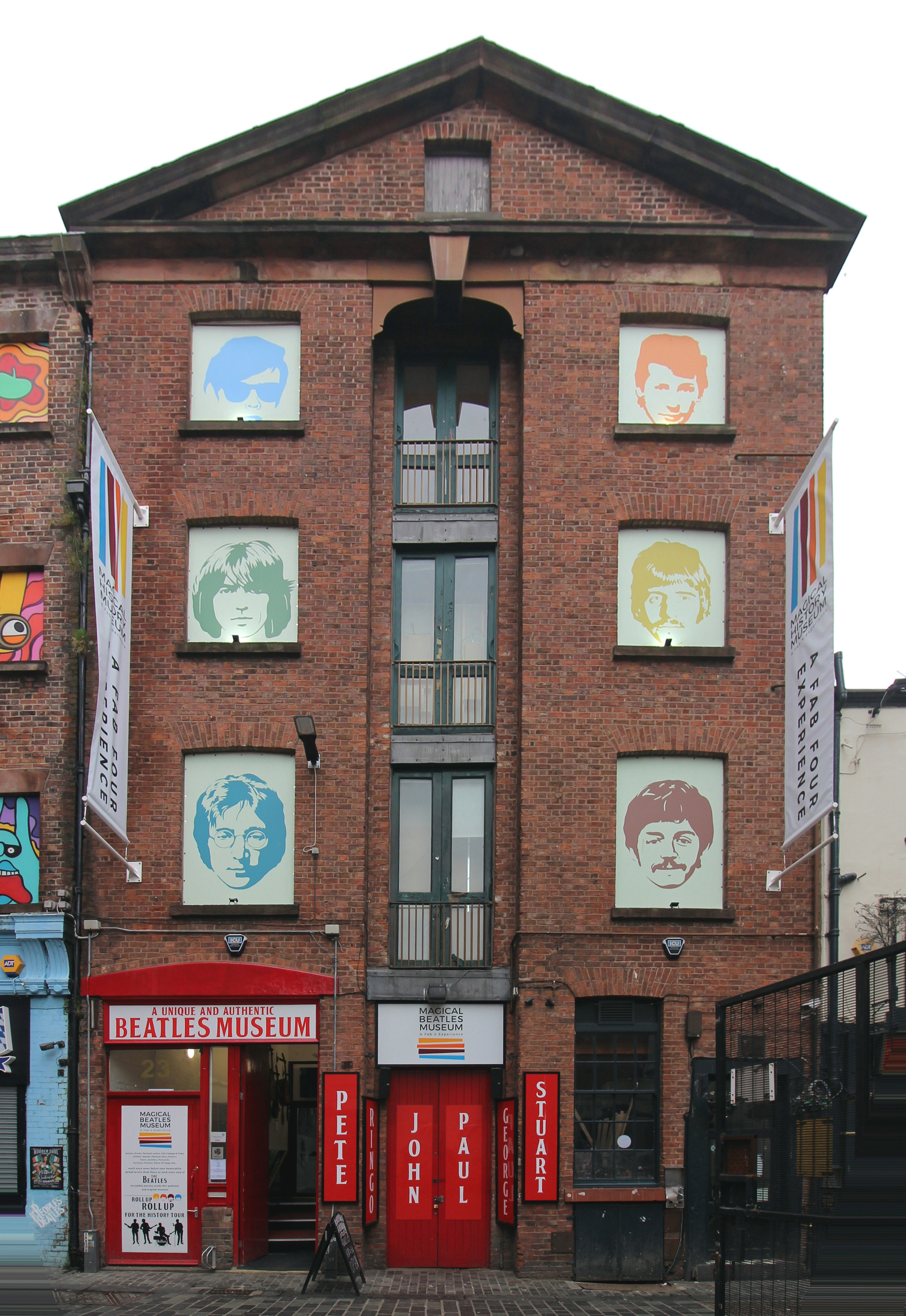
Magical Beatles Museum

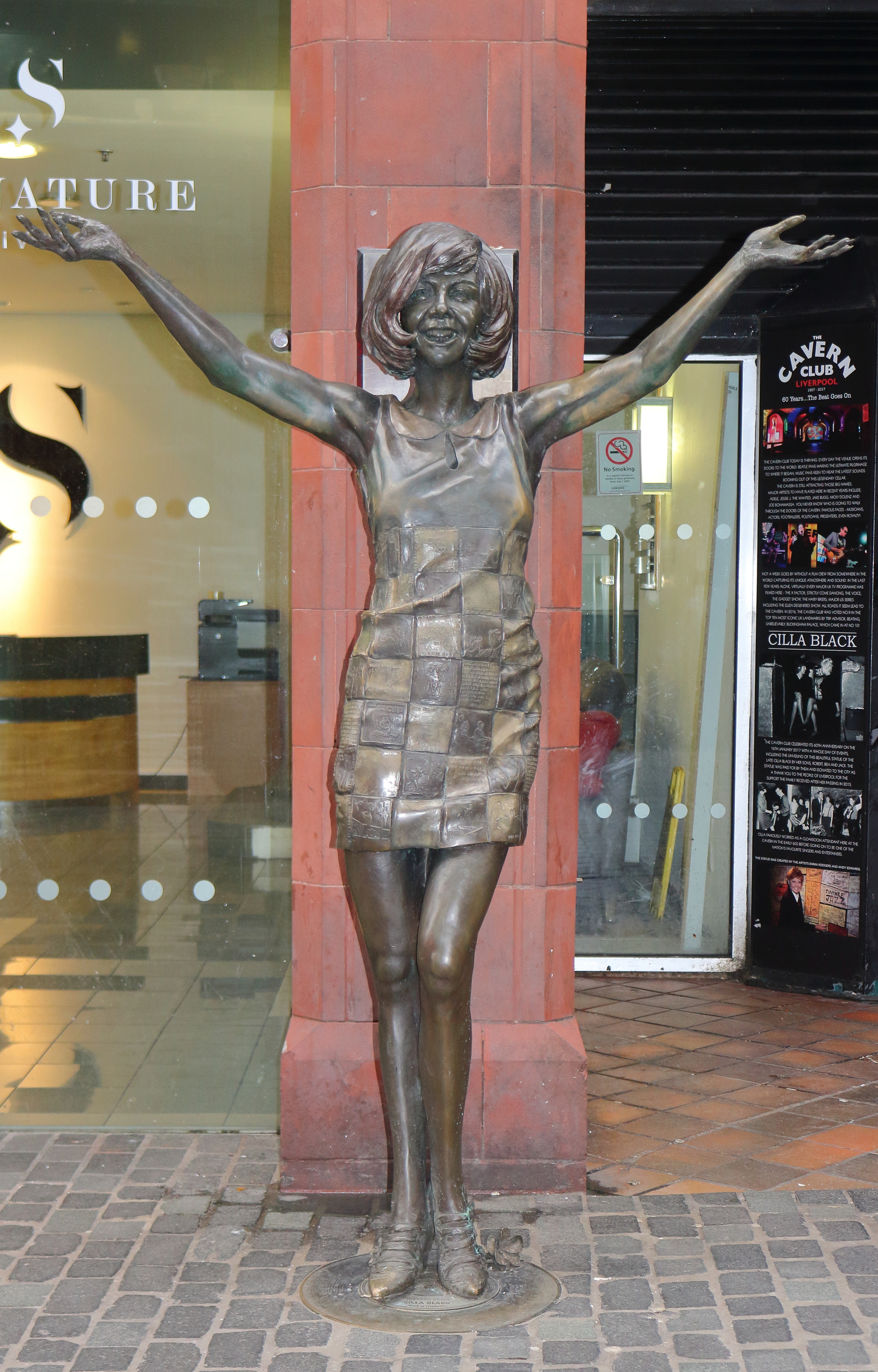
Cilla Black statue

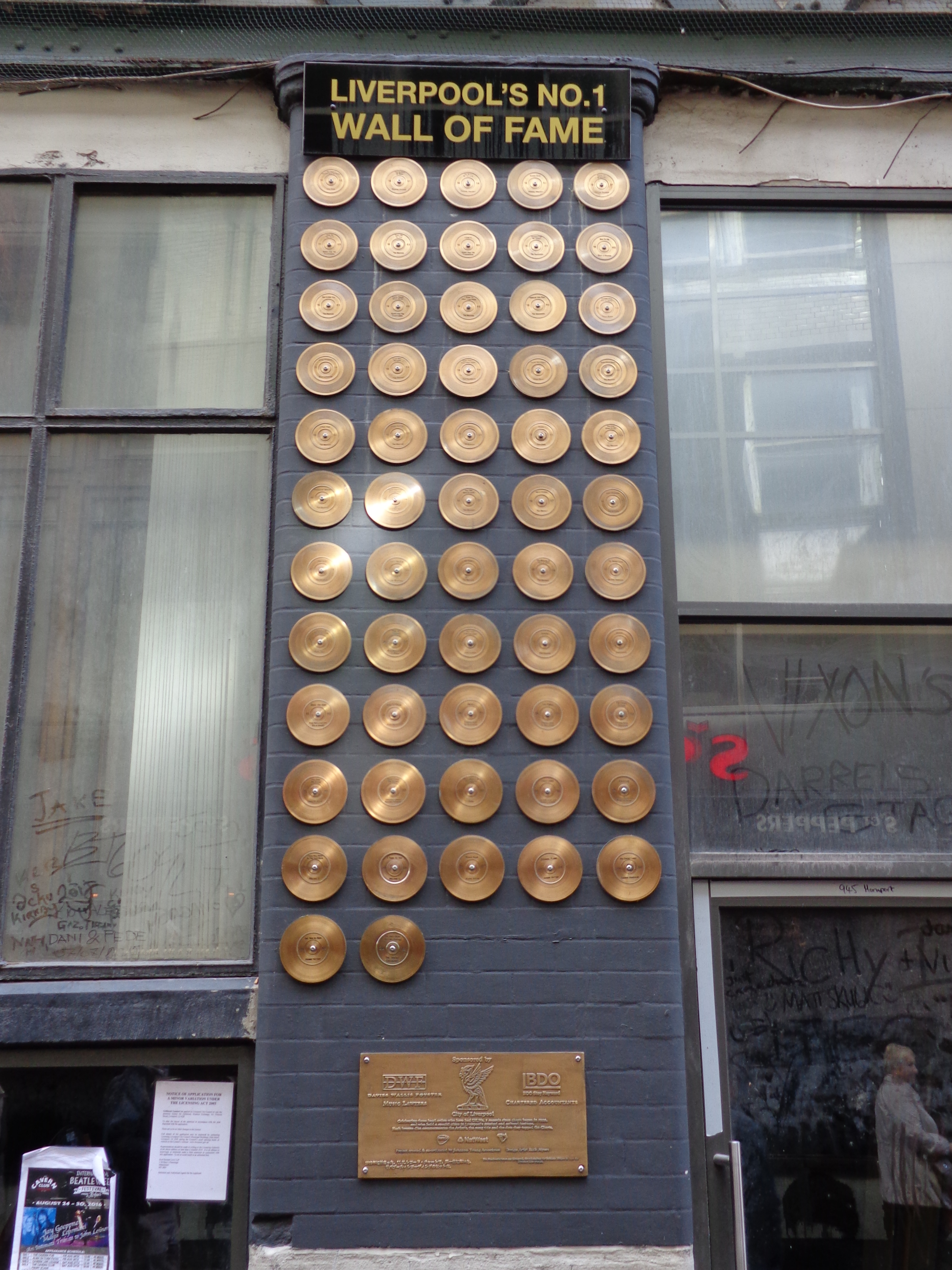
Liverpool Wall of Fame

== See also ==
- Cavern Mecca
- Liverpool Wall of Fame
- The Armadillo Tea Rooms (1980's), Liverpool
- The Cavern Pub
