= Bold Street, Liverpool =

Street in Liverpool, England

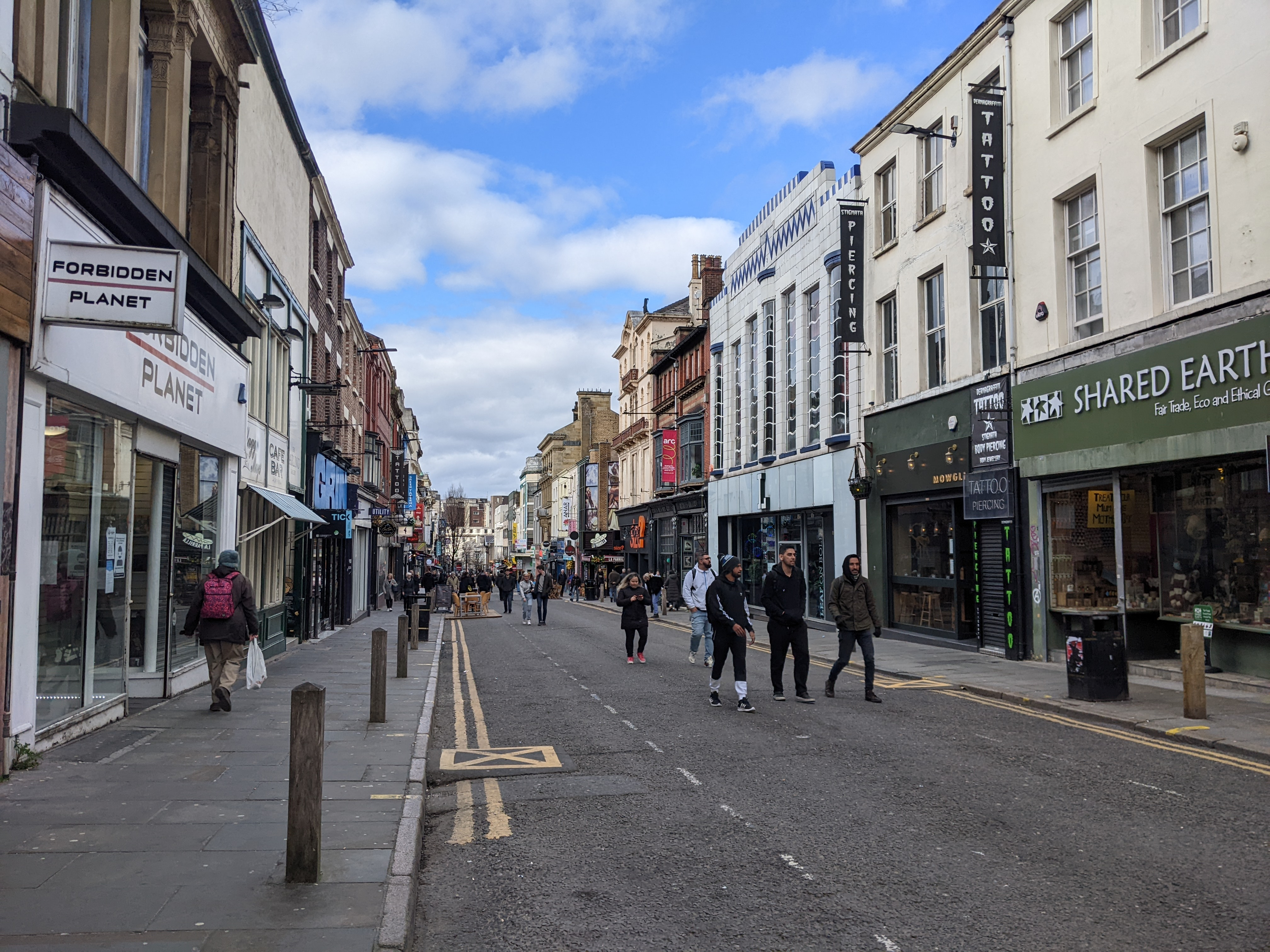
- The top of Bold Street, March 2022

- Location within Liverpool
- Location: Ropewalks, Liverpool city centre
- Postal code: L1
- Coordinates: 53°24′10″N 2°58′40″W

Other
- Known for: Cafes, restaurants, independent shopping

Bold Street is a street in Liverpool, England. It is known for its concentration of independent businesses and for the Church of St Luke, locally known as the "bombed-out church", which is situated at the top end of the street. The bottom end leads into the area surrounding Clayton Square, part of the main retail district of central Liverpool. The bottom end contains chain stores.

Liverpool Central, a major hub of the Merseyrail rapid transit/commuter rail network, can be accessed via an entrance on Bold Street next to The Lyceum, a post office which was Europe's first lending library. The middle area contains bars as it leads towards Concert Square, a square containing clubs and bars. The top end contains more independent shops and cafes. For the most part, Bold Street is pedestrianised and cars do not have access.

== History ==
Bold Street was originally laid out as a ropewalk, a long thin area of land used in the manufacture of rope. The area is now known as 'Rope Walks'. They used to measure the rope from the top of Bold Street to the bottom, because at over 300 metres it was the standard length needed for sailing ships. It was laid out for residences around 1780 and named after Jonas Bold, a noted sugar trader, banker and slave trader. In 1802, Bold became Mayor of Liverpool.

Merchants that worked on the docks needed houses close by. Therefore, houses were constructed in Hanover Street first, followed by Duke Street and then Bold Street. The fields in the area were also developed quickly into houses. There were port-related industrial activity in the area, with roperies occupying the site of Bold Street to supply the sailing ships. This intensified along with a demand for residential properties, so that the merchants could be located close to their business interests.

Physician Jonathan Binns, an 18th-century abolitionist, was among those building a home on the street.

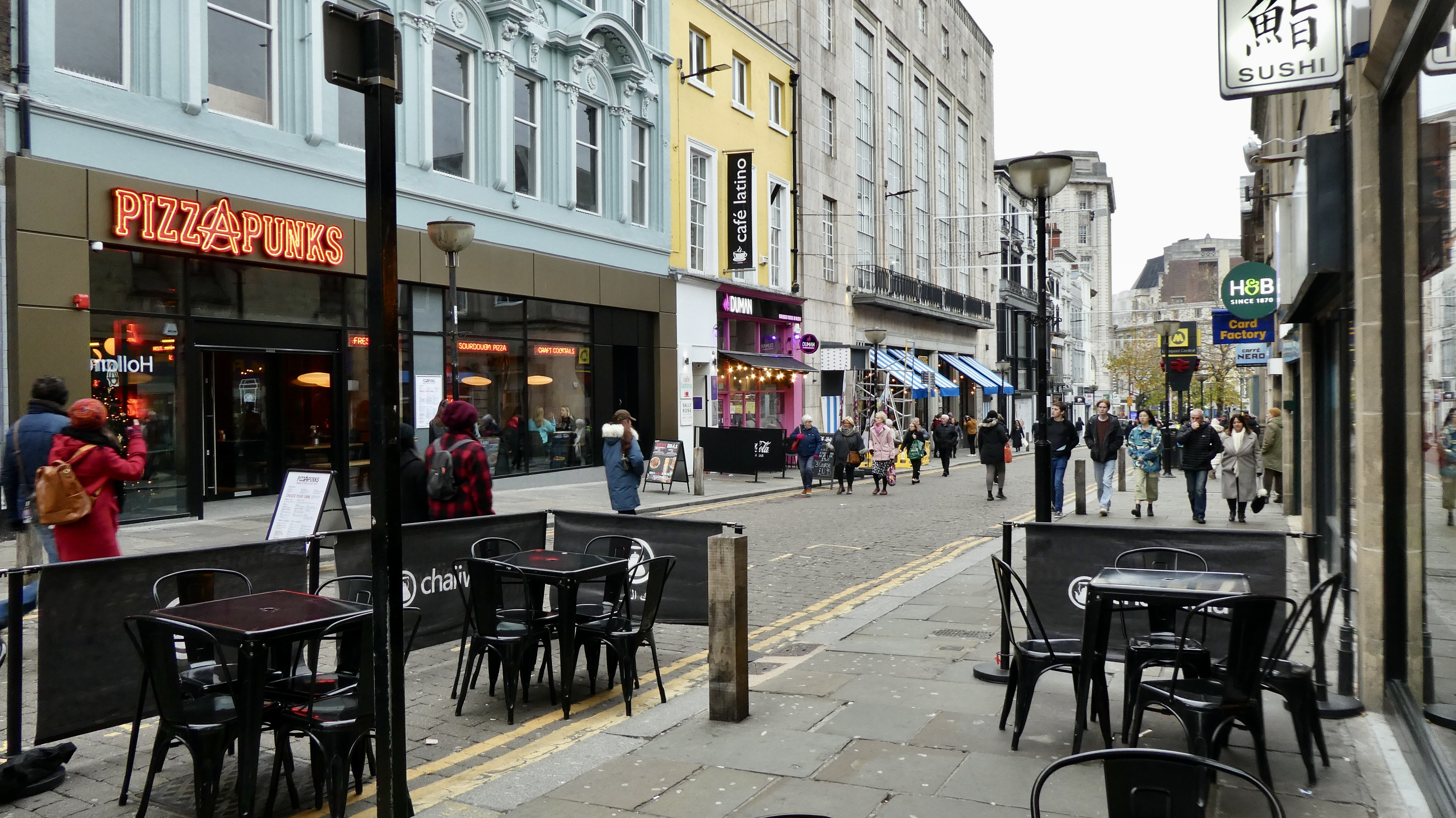
A pavement cafe at the bottom of Bold Street

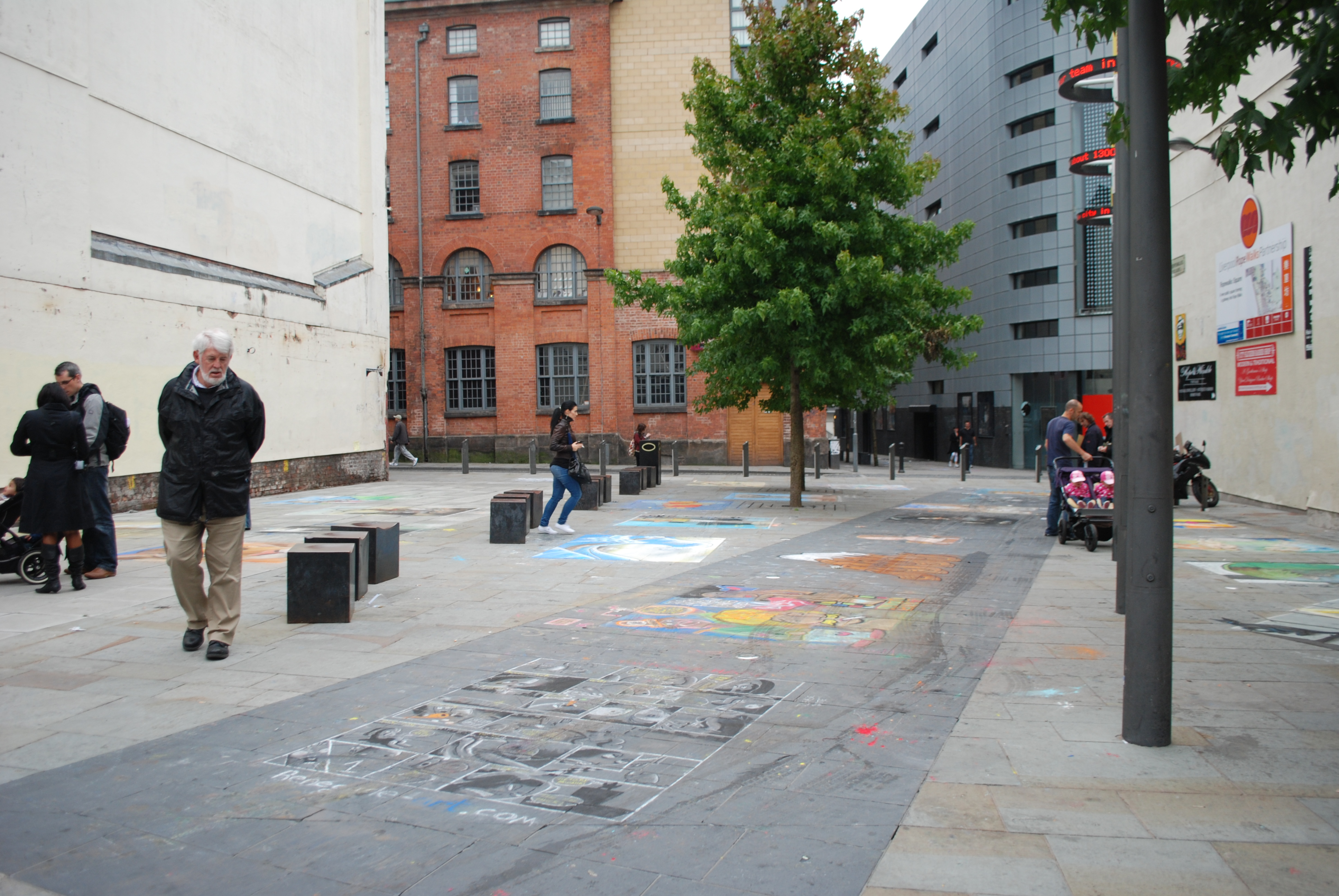
Pavement art on Bold Street

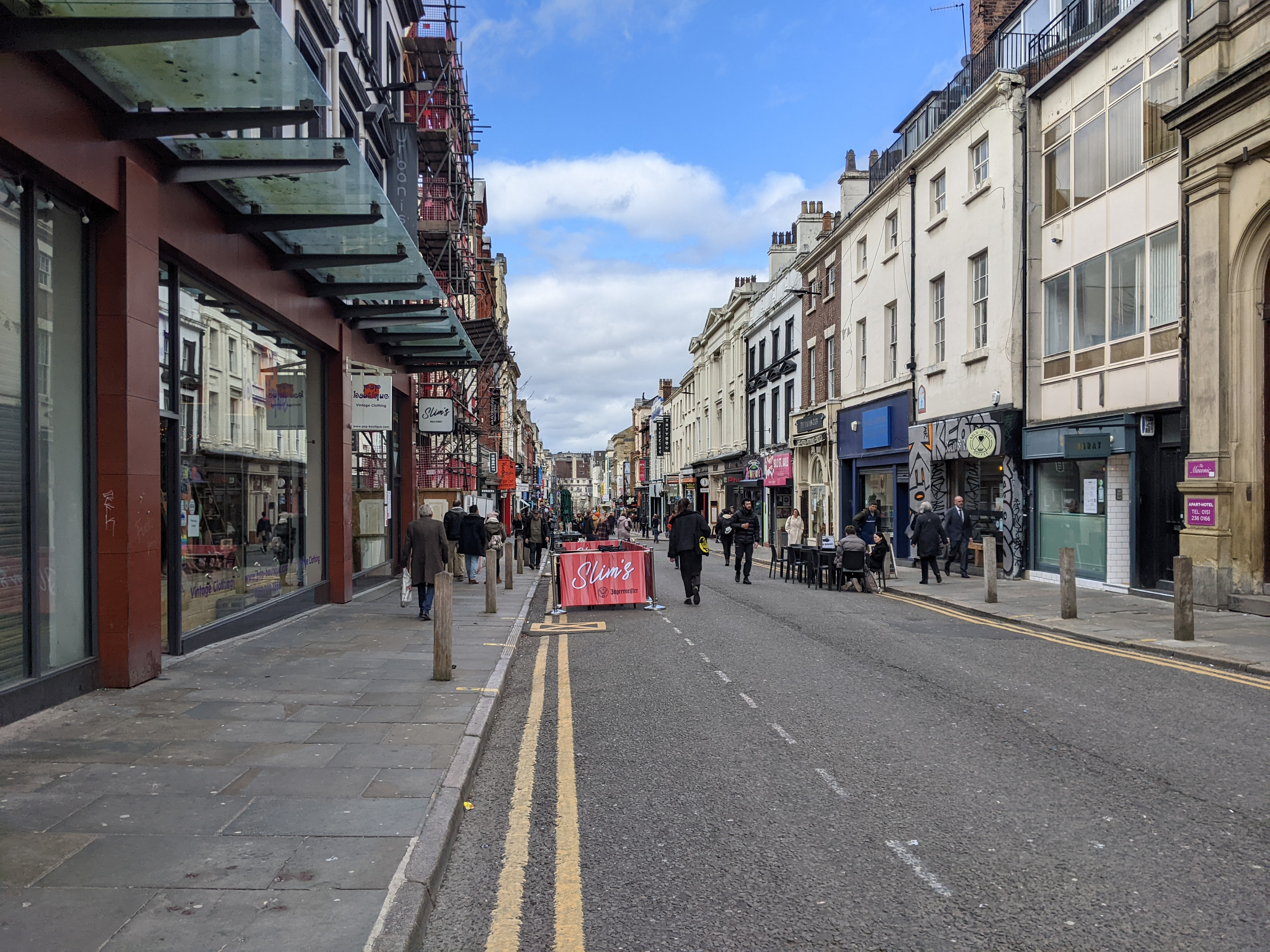
Walking down Bold Street

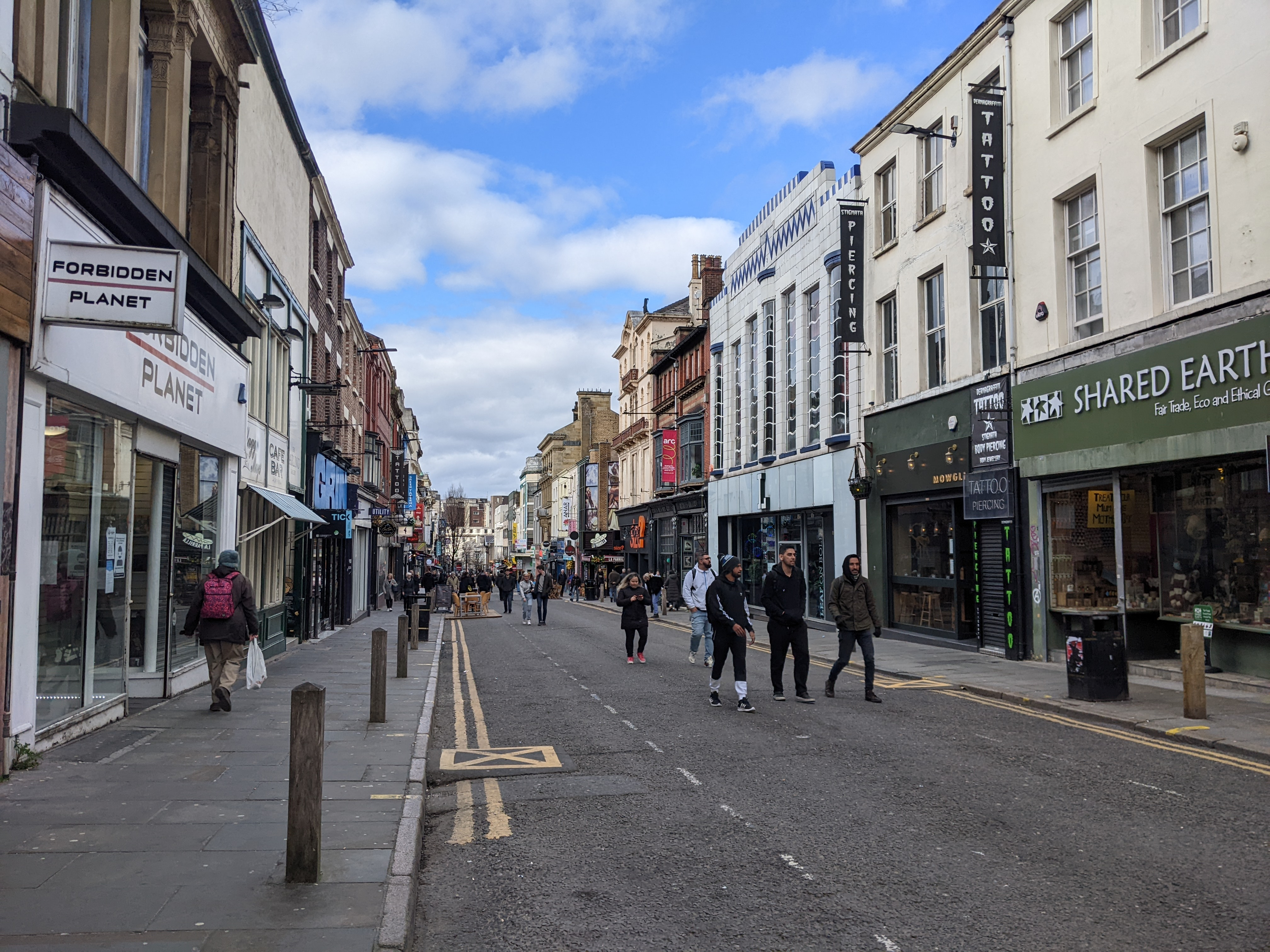
Walking down Bold Street

== Notable buildings and places of interest ==
- The Lyceum
- Liverpool Social Forum
- Concert Square
- News From Nowhere (bookshop)

== References in popular culture ==
The street is featured in a song of the same name by Liverpool-based singer-songwriter Eugene McGuinness, included on his debut EP, The Early Learnings of Eugene McGuinness, distributed by Domino Records in 2007.

== See also ==
- List of restaurant districts and streets
