= Ropewalks =

Ropewalks may refer to:

- Ropewalk
- Ropewalks, Liverpool
