= Ropewalks, Liverpool =

Shopping, leisure and nightlife district of Liverpool UK

Coordinates: 53.4025°N 2.9795°W

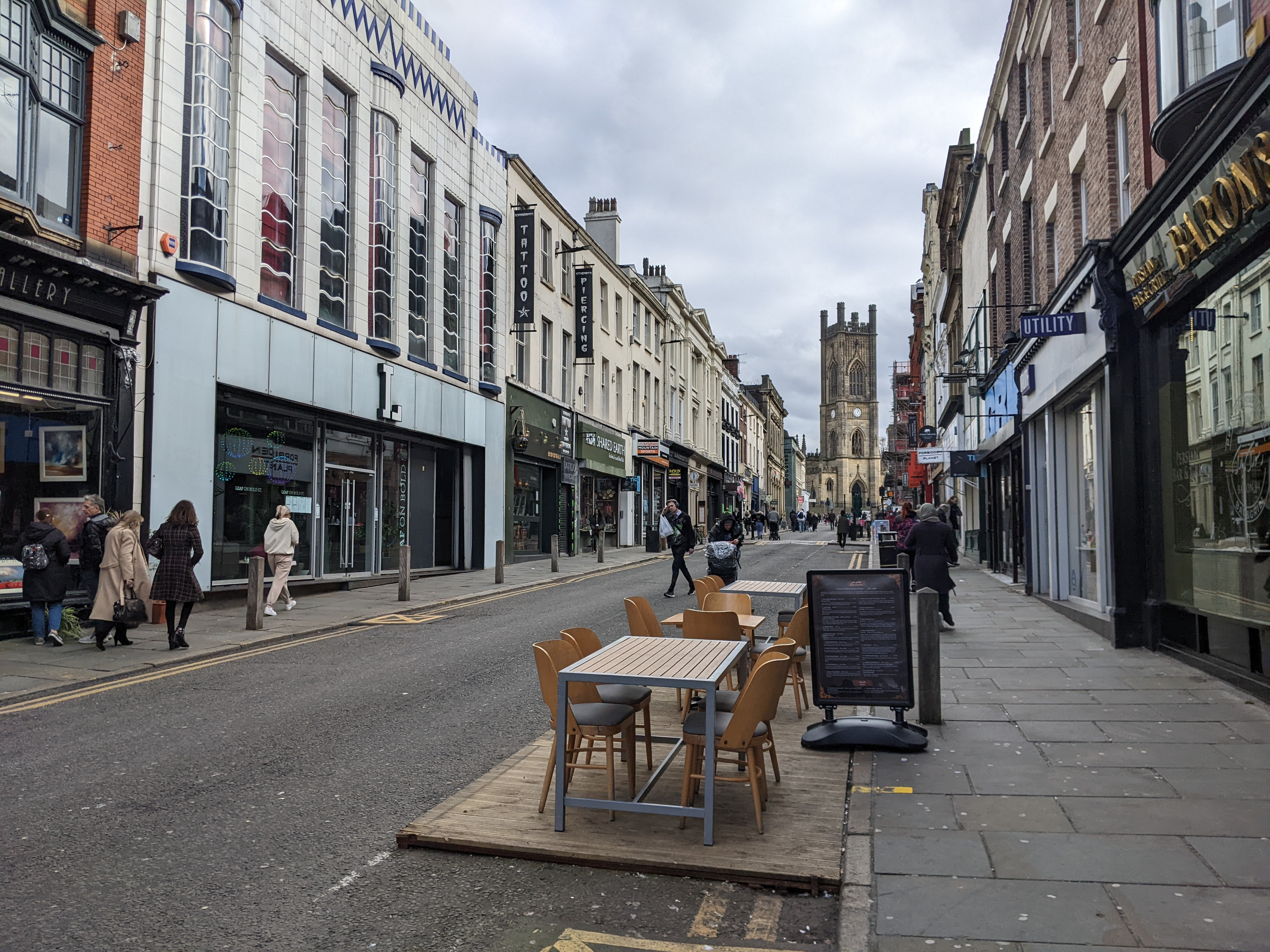
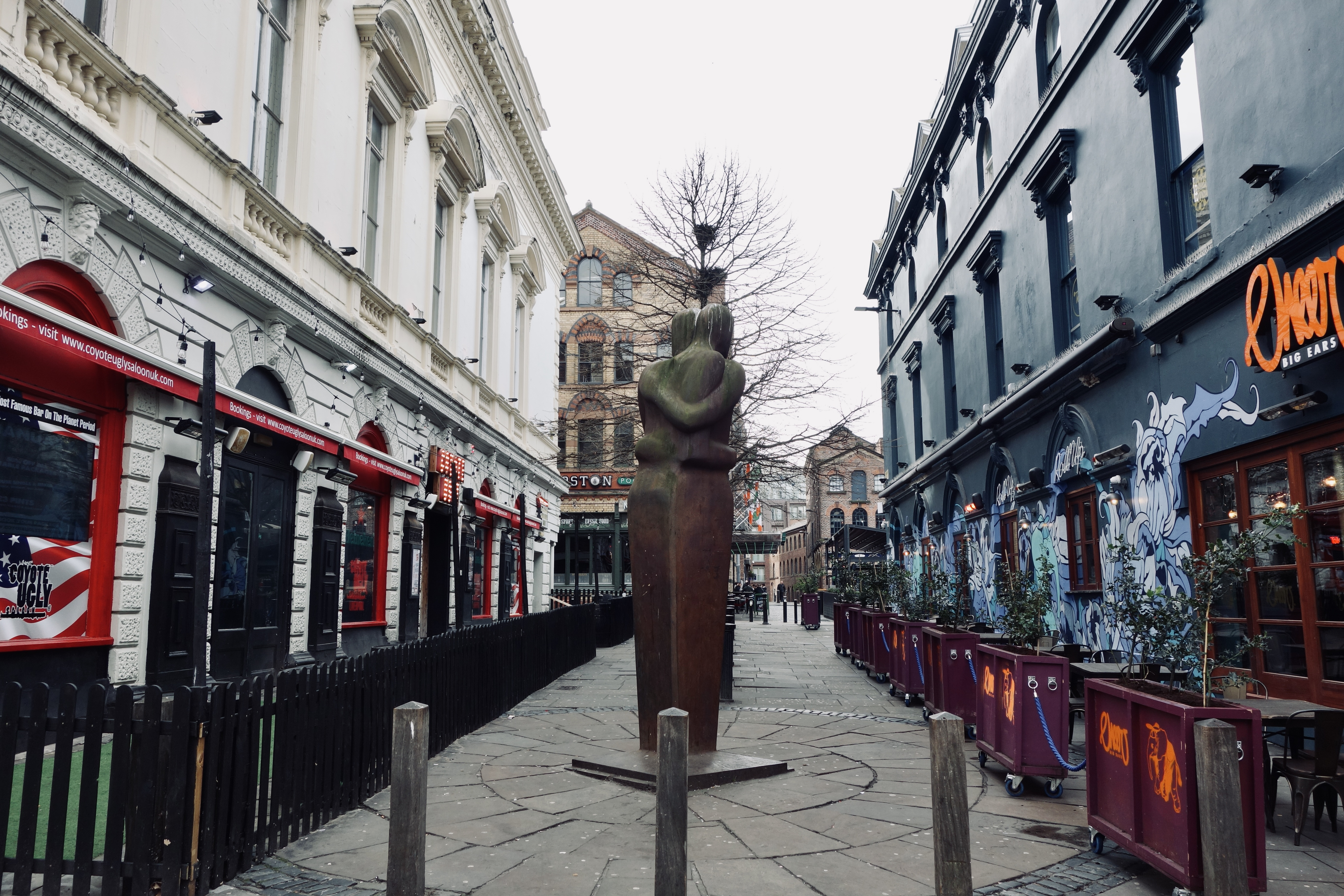
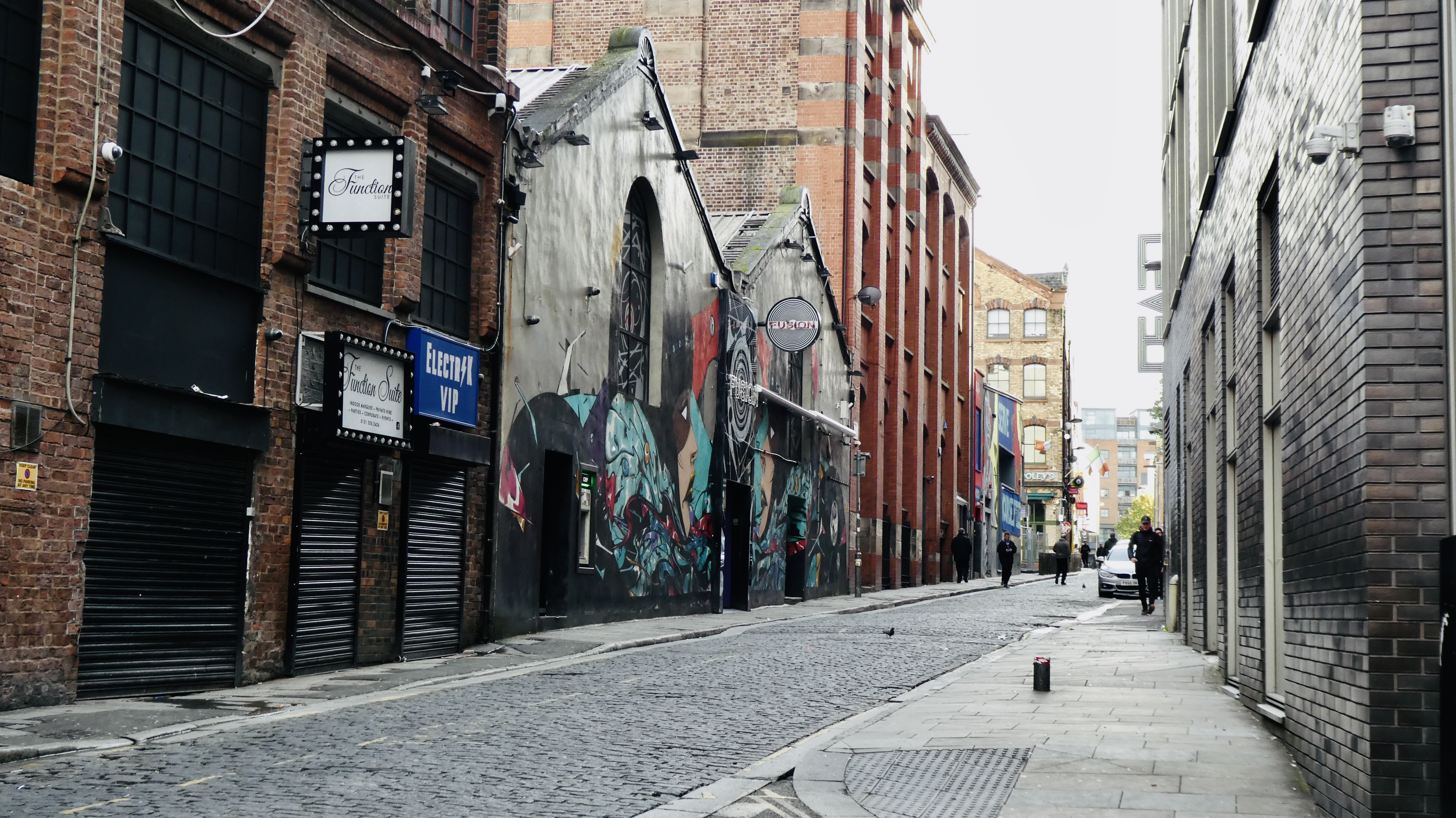
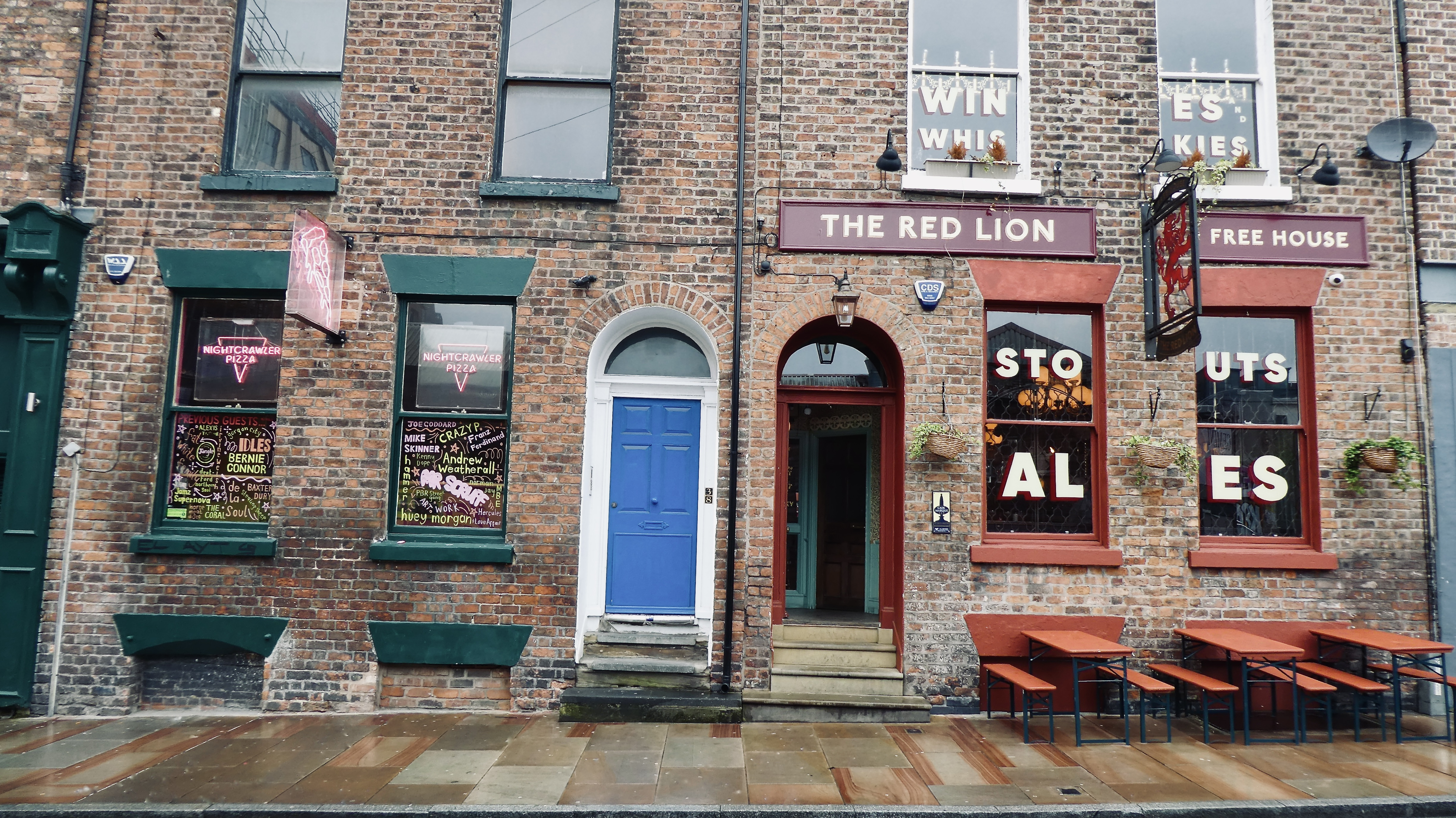
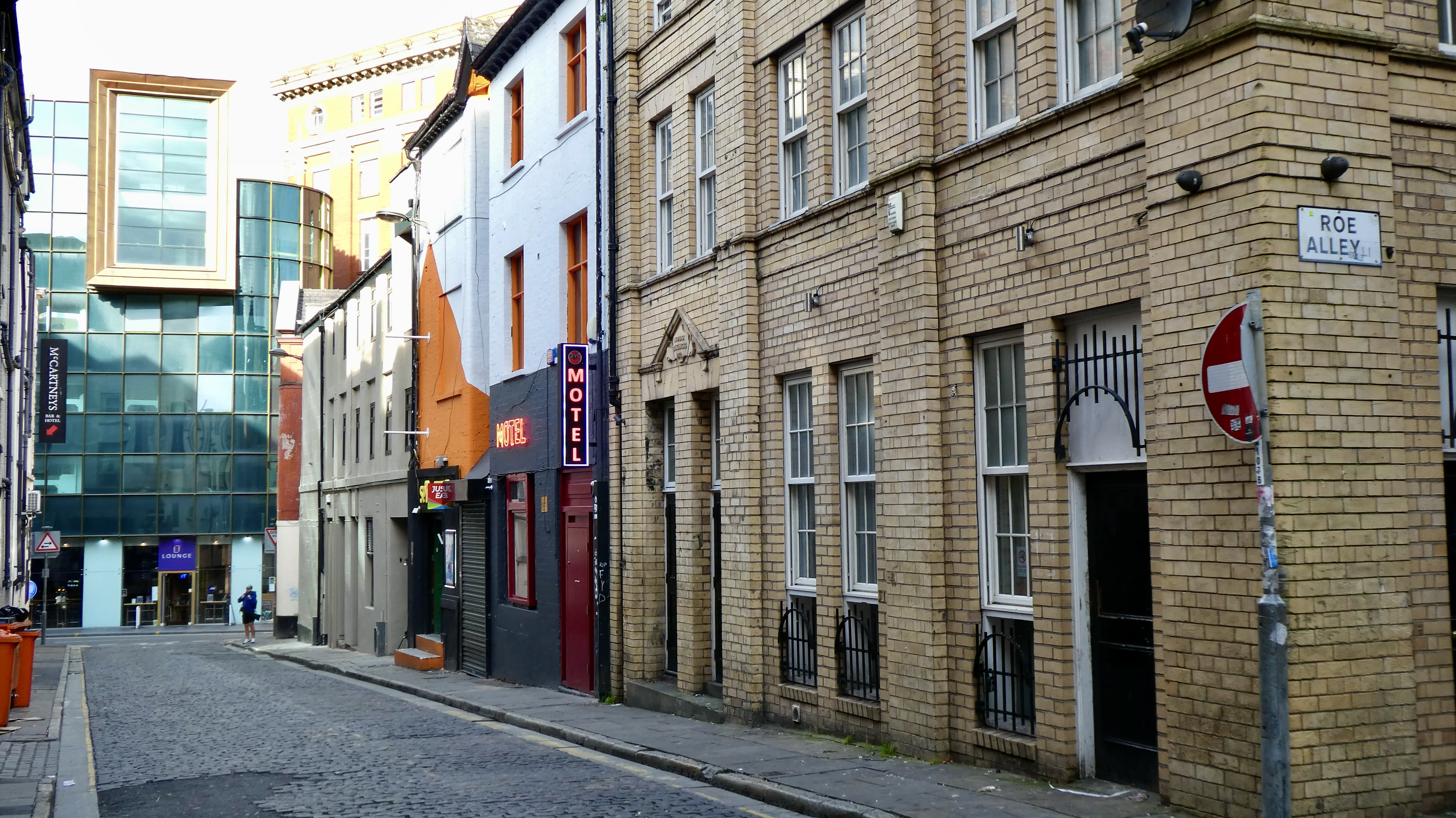
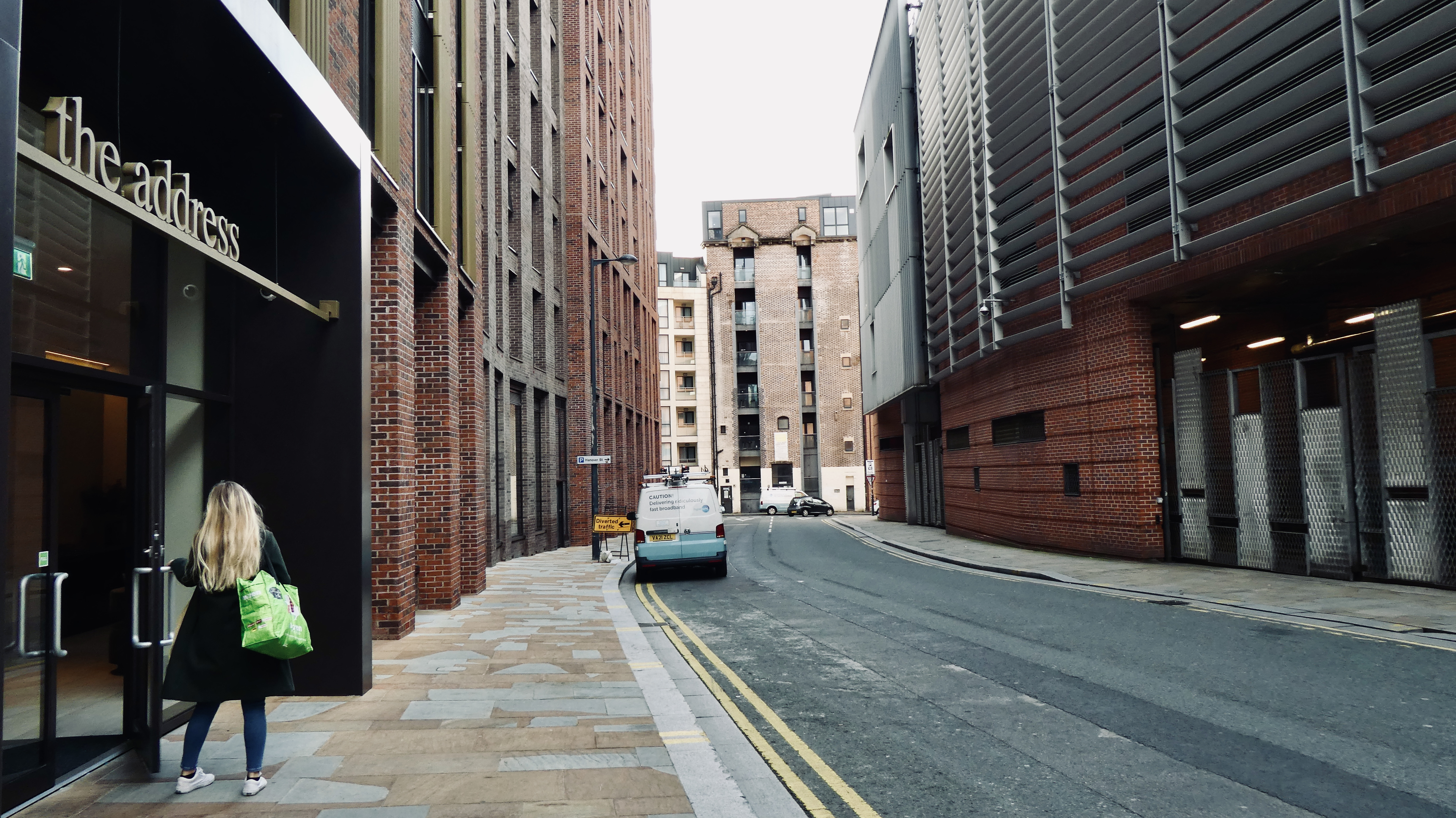
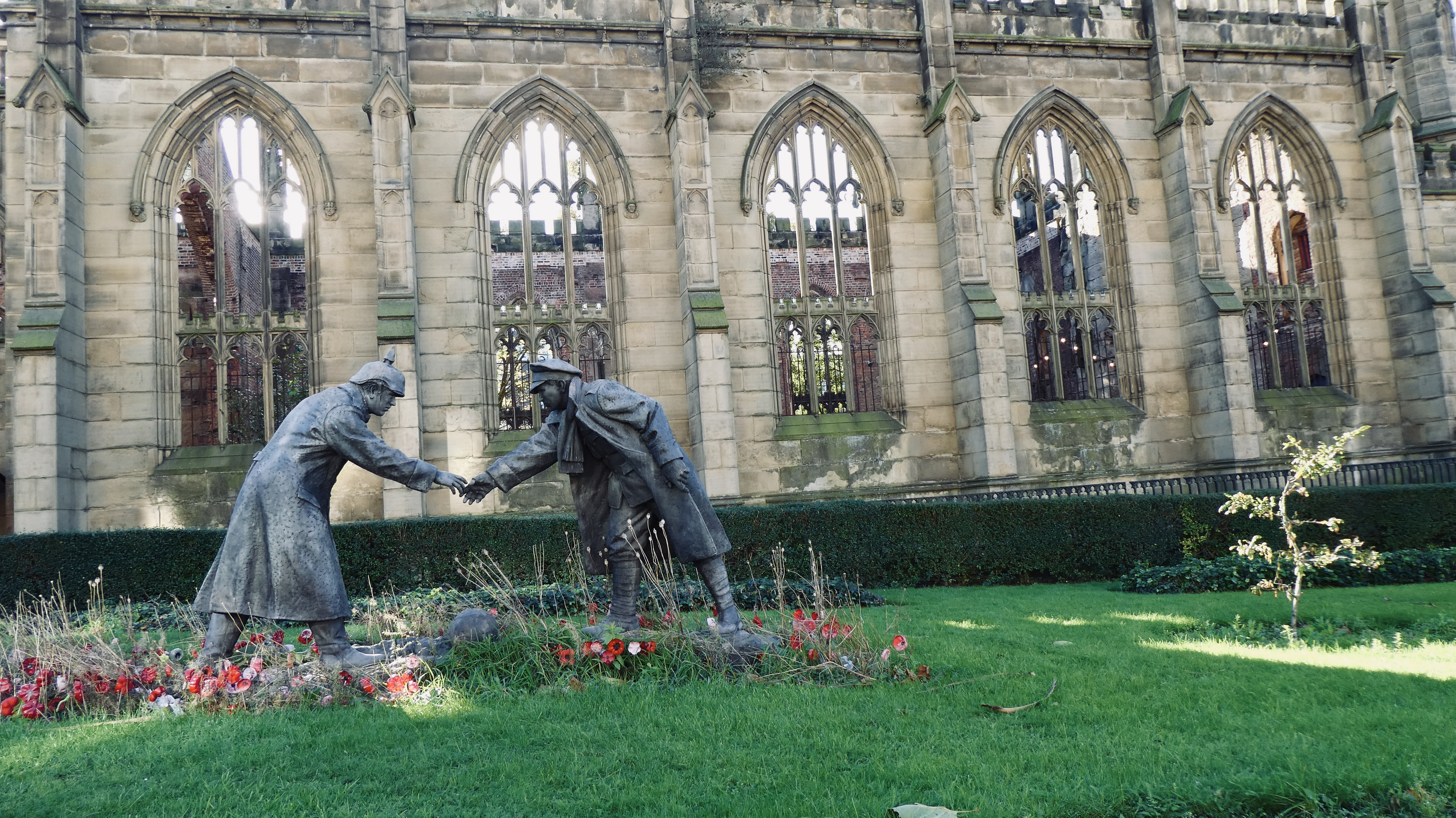
- Clockwise from top: Bold Street; Concert Square; Fleet Street; Slater Street; Fleet Street; David Lewis Street and Church of St Luke

- Location within Merseyside
- OS grid reference: SJ3488589995
- Metropolitan borough: Liverpool
- Metropolitan county: Merseyside
- Region: North West
- Country: England
- Sovereign state: United Kingdom
- Post town: Liverpool
- Postcode district: L1
- Dialling code: 0151
- Police: Merseyside
- Fire: Merseyside
- Ambulance: North West
- UK Parliament: Liverpool Riverside

Ropewalks is a district of Liverpool city centre bounded by Hanover Street to the north-west, Lydia Ann Street to the west, Roscoe Street to the east and Back Bold Street to north-east.

Ropewalks is a diverse district encompassing some of the most notable streets and squares in the city centre for independent shopping, cafe and restaurant culture, entertainment and night-time recreation. These include Bold Street, Wood Street, Wolstenholme Square, Fleet Street, Seel Street, Duke Street, Slater Street and Liverpool's Chinatown.

== History ==
The name is derived from the craft of rope-making for sailing ships that dominated the area until the 19th century. It is characterised by its long, straight streets running parallel to each other and historic warehouse buildings. The streets were built in this way to allow rope manufacturers to lay the ropes out lengthways during production. Ropes were made in fields but ropemakers bought or rented thin long strips of land. It was the sale of these thin strips, one by one at different times, that led to long thin streets with few interconnections. The streets themselves were not used in manufacture, the roperies pre-dated the streets.

== Notable streets and landmarks ==
=== Bold Street ===
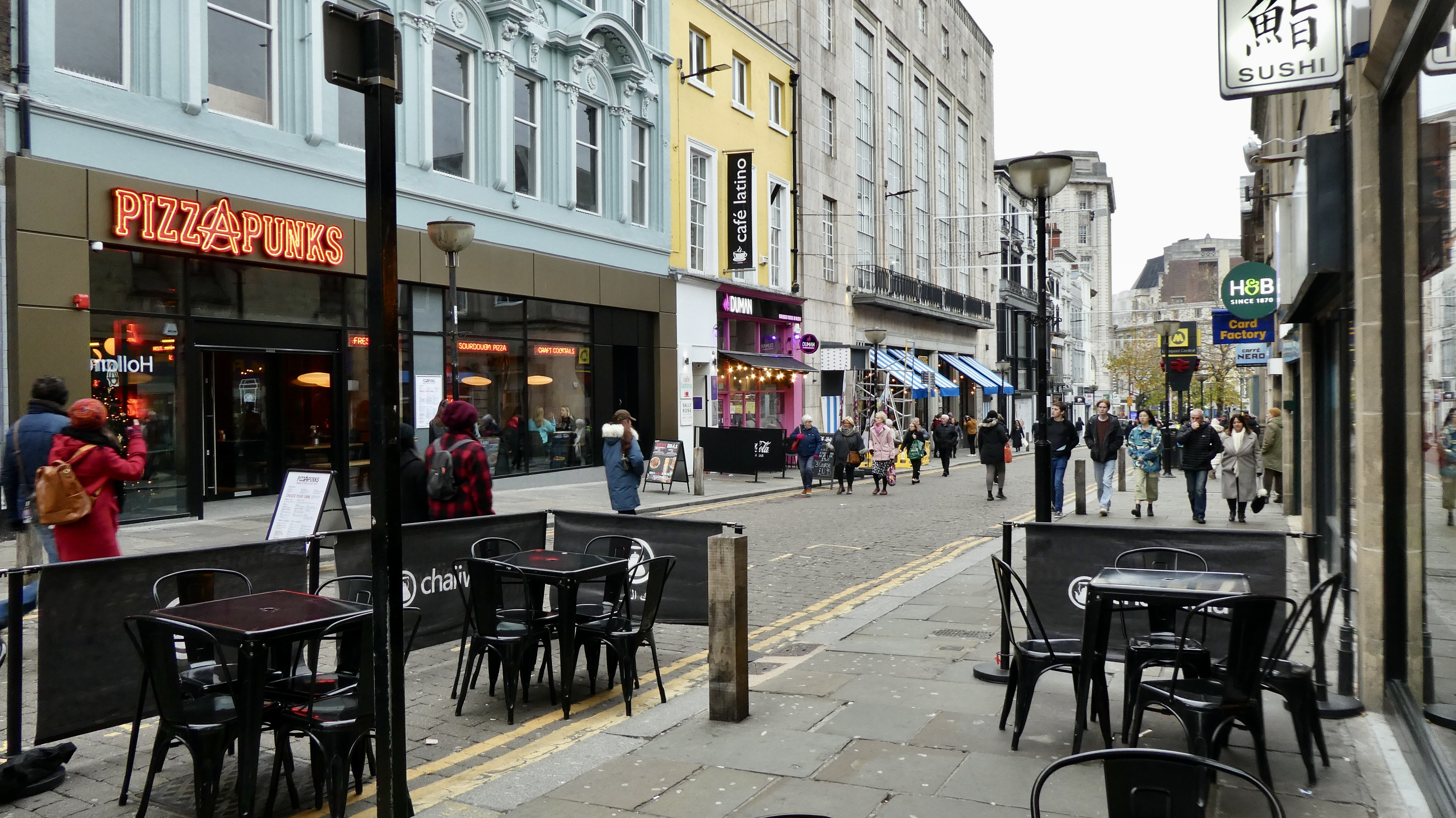
Bold Street, one of Liverpool's more bohemian streets

Bold Street is known today for its bohemian atmosphere and its mix of tourists, buskers, eclectic independent shops, and diverse restaurants from many different cultures and ethnic groups. However, the street started life as a ropewalk in the 17th century and the beginning of the 18th Century. The street was originally used for measuring out the full length and then cutting rope which was to be used for ships. Rope was laid out from one end of the street to the other, the location was especially convenient as the street was the same standard length needed for sailing ships, including slave ships. In the 19th century, the street was later renamed to Bold Street after Jonas Bold, a slave merchant, sugar trader and banker, who became Lord Mayor of Liverpool in 1802. At the bottom of Bold Street stands The Lyceum Building, a historic landmark constructed in 1802, originally as a news room and England's first subscription library. In 2001, a shaft from an old well dating from the 17th century was discovered during renovations on a property on Bold Street. Archaeologists claimed that the well was built when the area was still a field and would have been used for drinking purposes. Today, the well is a feature within the vintage fashion boutique, Soho's.

=== Bombed out church ===
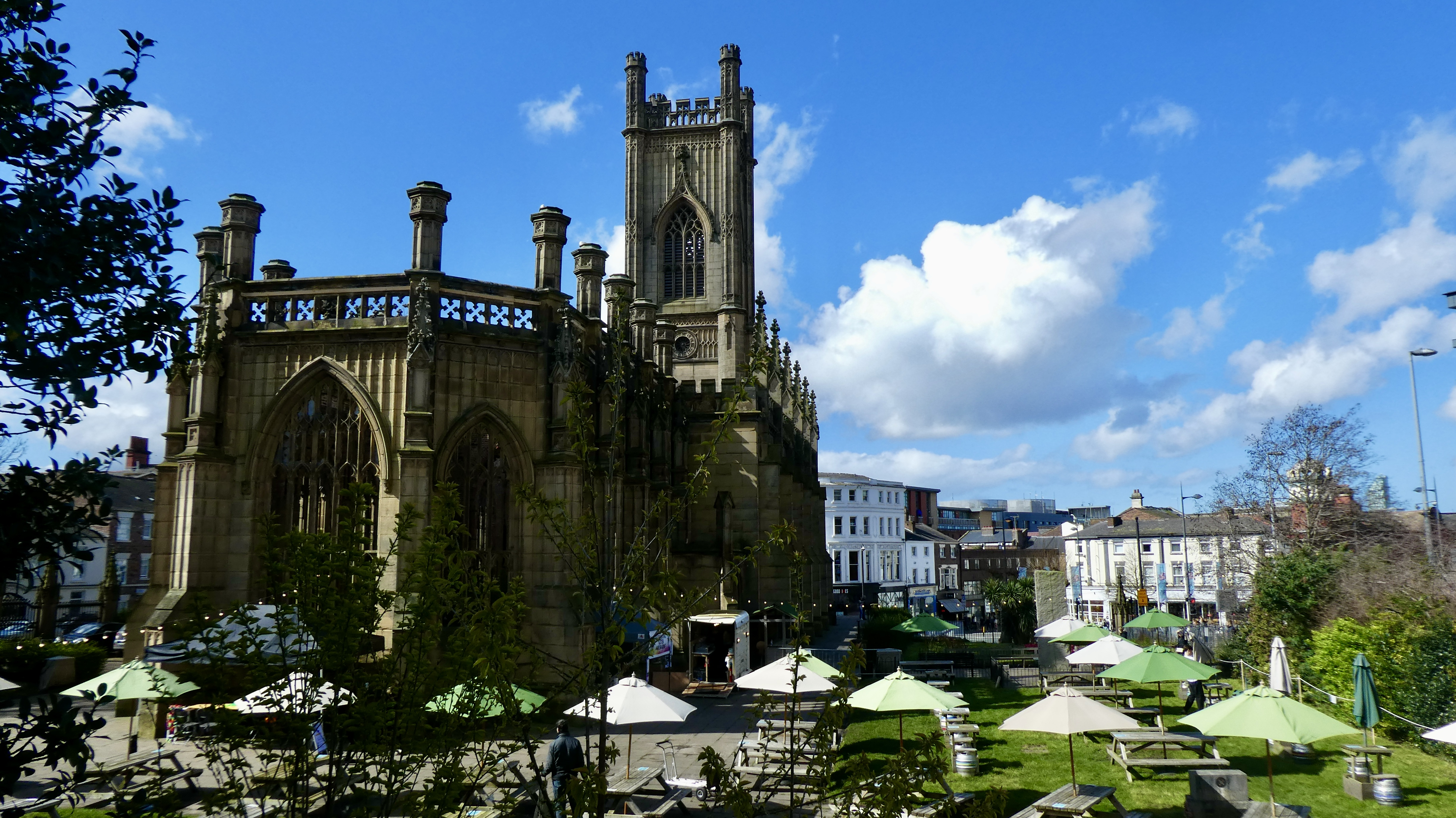
Liverpool's bombed out church, showing an outdoor event

The 'bombed-out church', formally known as St Luke's Church, is situated at the top end of Bold Street at the corner of Leece Street and Berry Street. The church opened in 1832 and suffered catastrophic damage during the May Blitz of 1941. As the largest port on the west coast of Britain, a major industrial city and naval base, Liverpool was specifically targeted and became one of the most heavily bombed areas outside of London. Following a large fire that swept through the building, only the external masonry survived. The site lay derelict, overgrown and inaccessible for over 60 years. In the 2000s, it was eventually cleared, reopened to the public and is used today as a memorial to the casualties of war and for regular community arts and cultural events. Some of the events have included theatre, dance, classical, music, visual art, cinema, as well as alternative occasions.

=== Chinatown ===
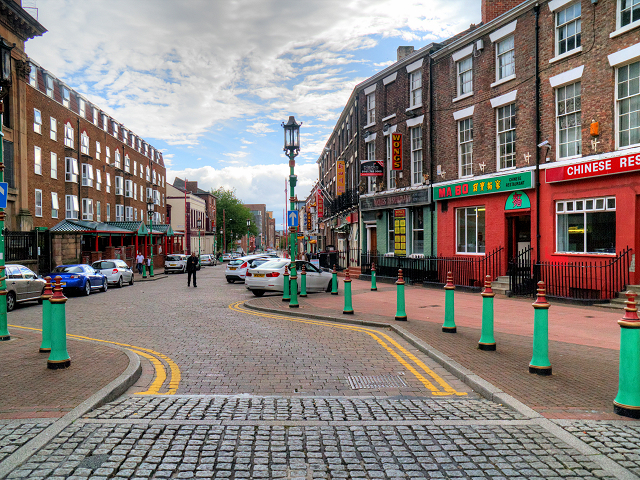
Nelson Street, home to Chinatown, Liverpool

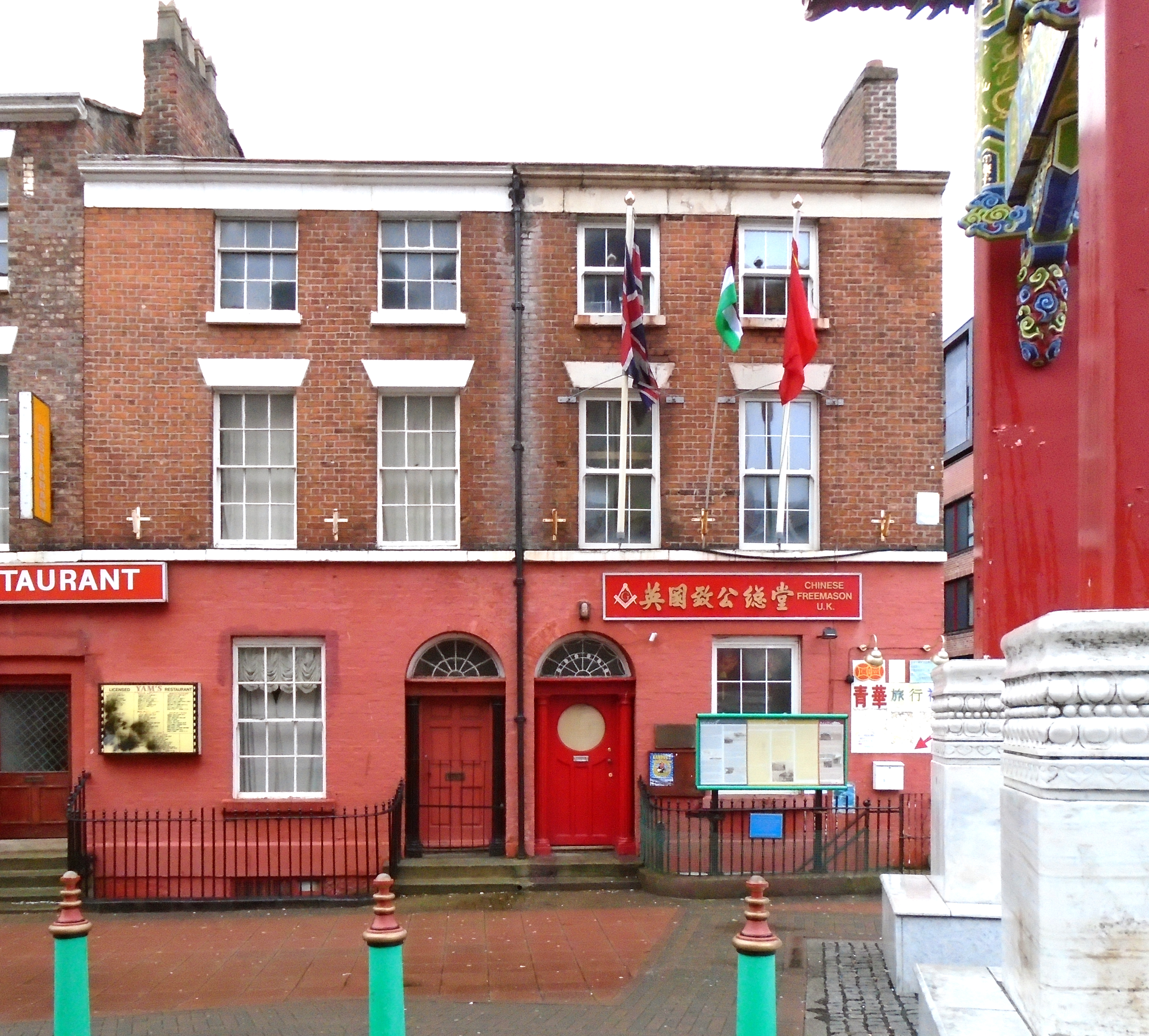
19th century Grade II listed buildings on Nelson Street

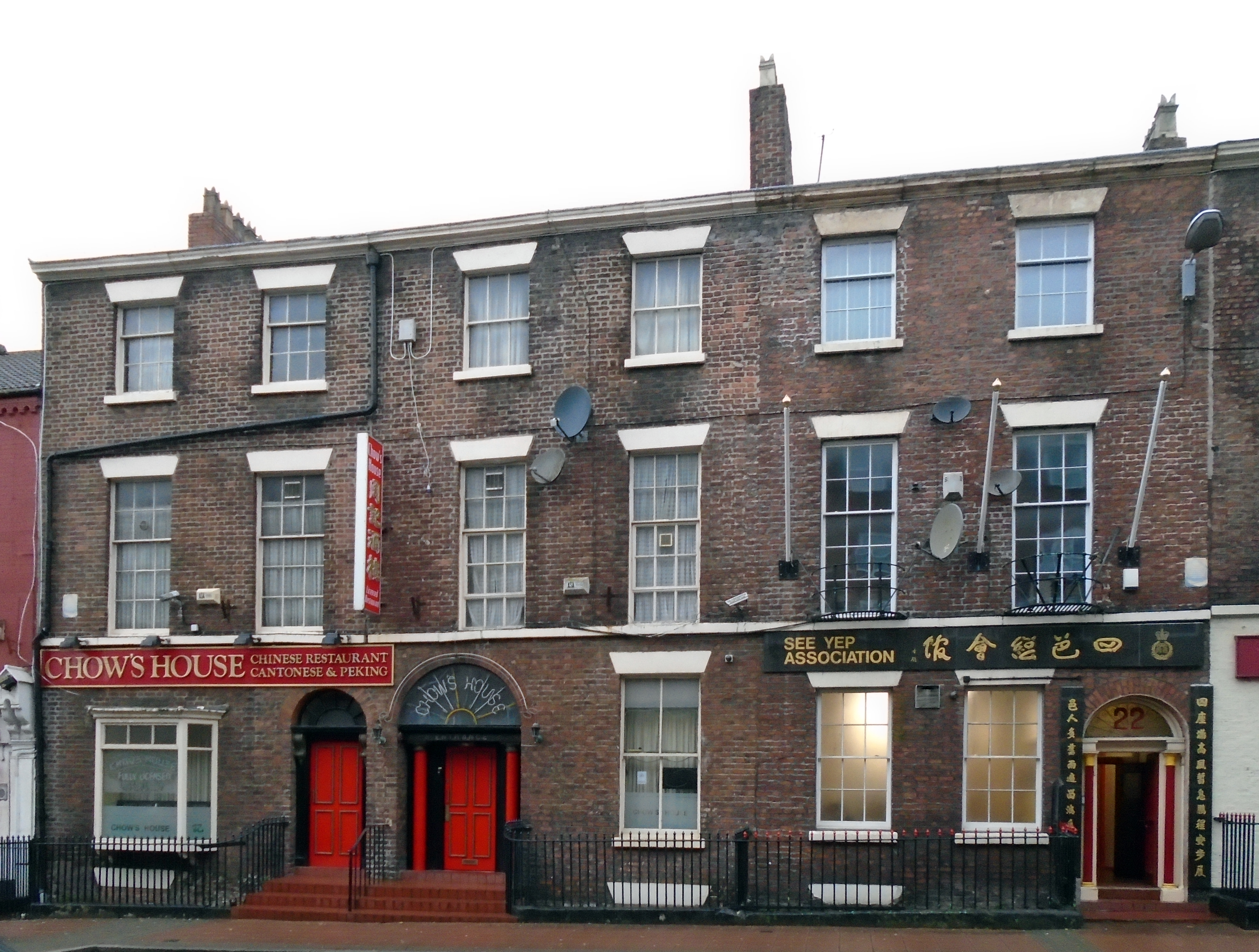
19th century Grade II listed buildings on Nelson Street

Chinatown, Liverpool is home to the longest established Chinese community in Europe and is renowned for its restaurants, takeaways, supermarkets and Chinese cultural institutions. Evidence of the longstanding Chinese culture exists in the Liverpool Chinese Business Association, the Pagoda Youth Orchestra, the Nook House pub on Nelson Street, street signs written in the Chinese language, as well as many other examples. Liverpool's four universities continue to attract thousands of Chinese students every year and as of 2021, Liverpool was home to the third largest Chinese population in England and Wales outside London. Liverpool also has the largest Chinese arch outside of China, given as a gift from its sister city Shanghai, and which marks the gateway to the city's modern day Chinatown on Nelson Street.

Since the 19th century, and especially during the two world wars, Liverpool's status as a major coastal port has led to a deep relationship and strong ties between the city, Shanghai and Hong Kong. Cargo ships importing silk, cotton, and tea from China arrived in Liverpool from the 1830s. Waves of Chinese immigrants on the Blue Funnel Shipping Line arrived in Liverpool in the 1860s and by the 1890s, an associated Chinese community emerged around the city's docklands. Chinese sailors set up businesses, such as boarding houses, to cater for others speaking in their own language. Eventually, some Chinese sailors married local women which in return created the first British-born Eurasian Chinese community in the heart of Liverpool. The location of the first Chinatown can, therefore, be traced to Liverpool's docklands. However, some sailors settled on Cleveland Square, Pitt Street and Frederick Street, thus creating a new Chinatown.

After World War I, the Chinese population in Liverpool spread more inland to Cornwallis Street, Dickenson Street, Kent Street and Greetham Street. Many Chinese owned food businesses were now trading in Pitt Street with laundry businesses also setting up around the city. The economic depression of the 1930s and its adverse effects on the shipping business led to the decline of the new Chinatown and many buildings and warehouses were left decaying and condemned around Pitt Street for a period of time.

Thousands more Chinese people arrived in Liverpool during World War II as seamen were recruited in to the British Merchant Navy from Shanghai, Singapore, and Hong Kong and then mostly stationed in Liverpool. As a major ocean gateway, Liverpool was depended upon for port transportation, food and ammunition. However, the community were forced from their homes and forced to uproot during the bombings of the second world war when both the new and original dockland Chinatowns were devastated. Pitt Street, Cleveland Square and Fredrick Street were destroyed and the Chinese community moved further inland to Nelson Street, Great George Street, Upper Parliament Street, Duke Street and Berry Street - areas of the city which are still associated with the modern day Chinatown today.

=== Concert Square ===
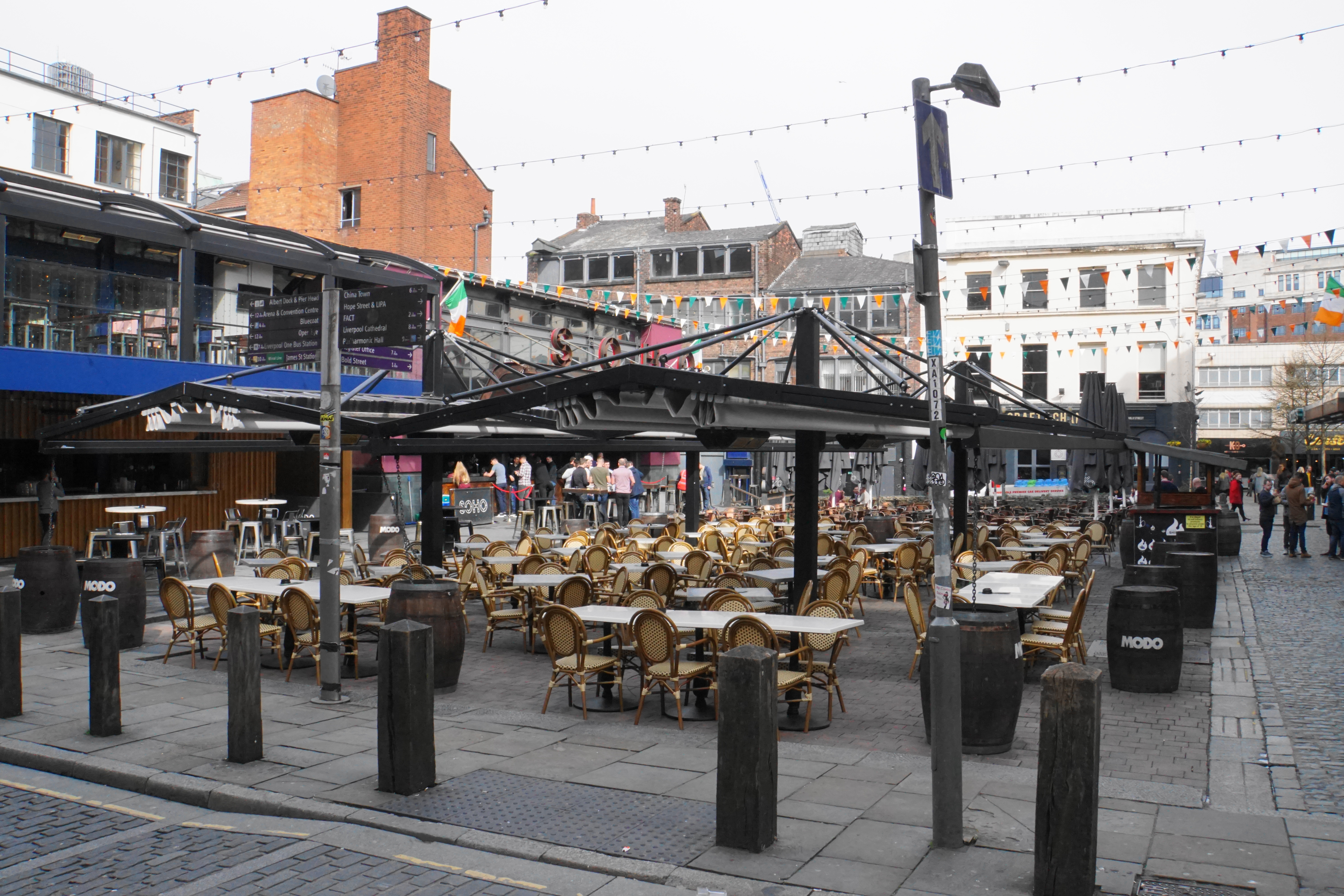
Concert Square, a major centre of Liverpool's nightlife

Since the 1990s, Concert Square is one of the main areas in Liverpool for outdoor drinking and nightlife. The square and immediate surrounding area is characterised by historic warehouses and newer developments which house bars and clubs. The square has become a focus for tourists from all around the UK and beyond who visit for leisure and entertainment. Major events such as high-profile football matches or the start of the UK's new university student term in September are particular highlights during the year. Baa Bar on Fleet Street, just off the square, is regarded as one of the first bars responsible for establishing the area as a centre for nightlife.

=== FACT Liverpool ===
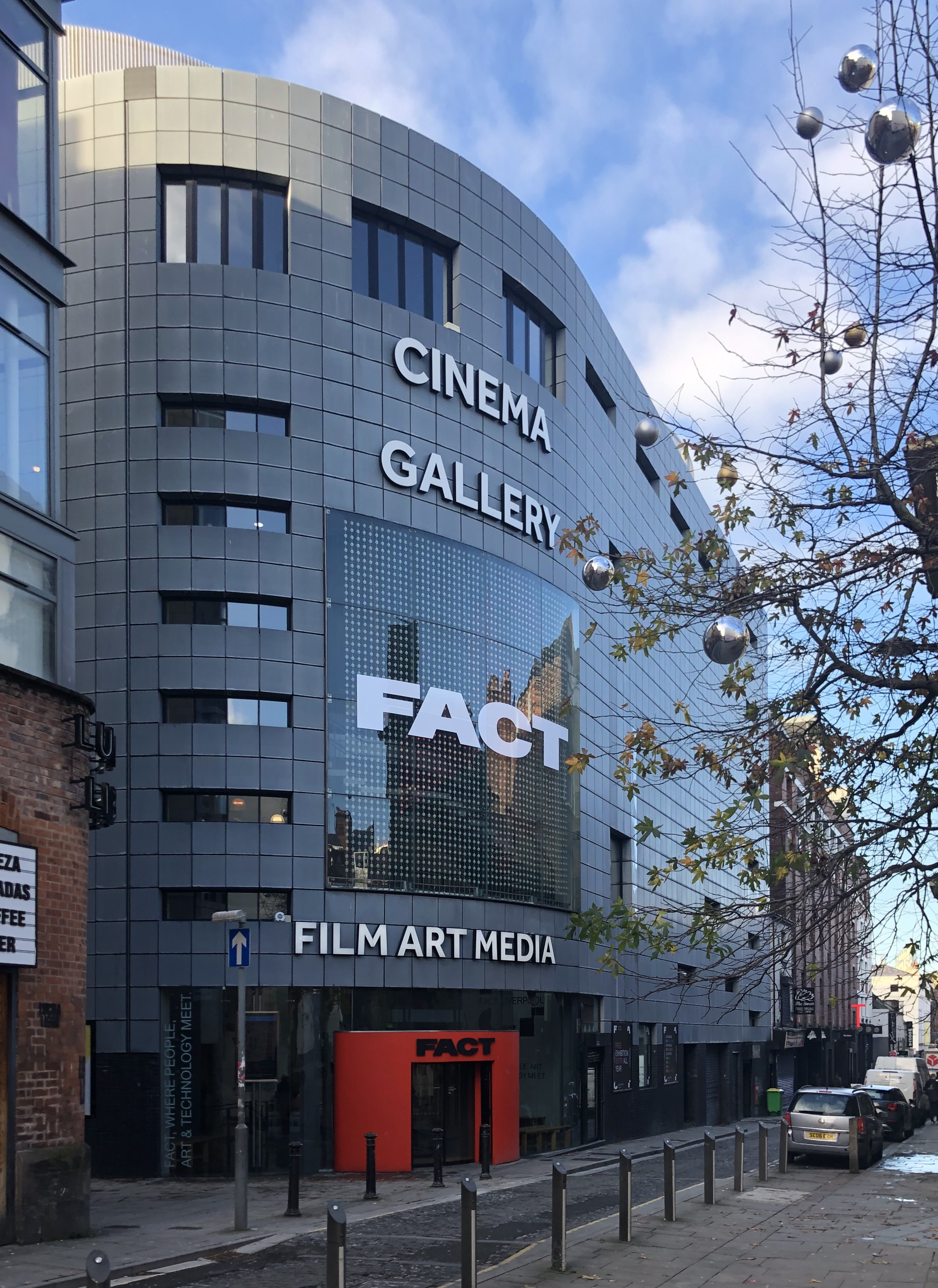
FACT Liverpool

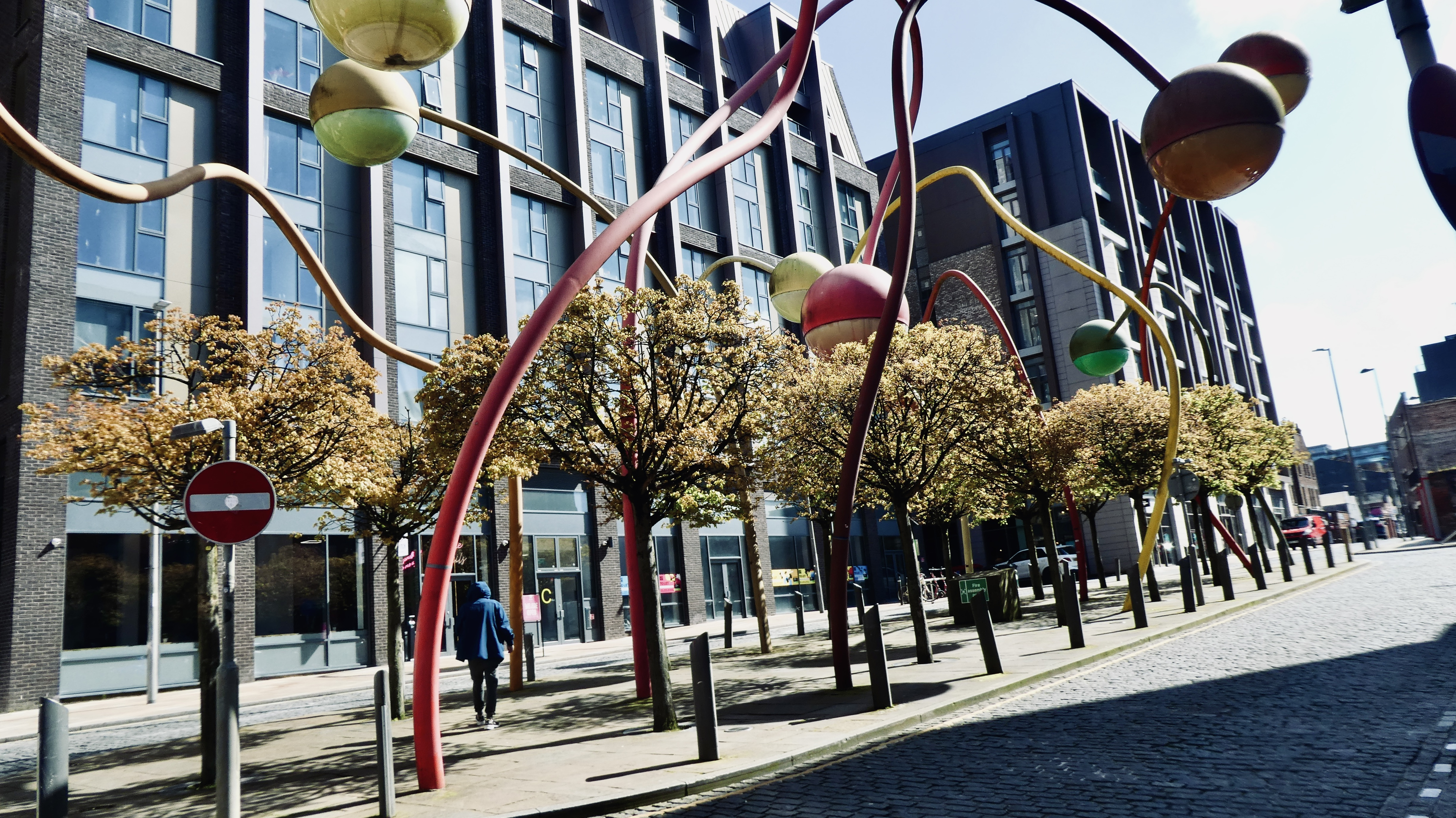
Penelope sculpture, Wolstenholme Square

FACT Liverpool (Foundation for the Arts and Creative Technologies) is an important part of the UK's cultural life and is located on Wood Street. Officially opened in 2003, FACT is a purpose-built arts building housing art galleries, a media and events space, a lab for learning and experimentation, a Picturehouse cinema and bar. FACT both exhibits and produces video, digital art and film. Designed by architect Austin-Smith:Lord, the centre welcomes millions of visitors every year and has hosted high-profile international guests and stars of Hollywood. FACT regularly participates in Liverpool Biennial, the contemporary art festival featuring art from all over the world.

=== Wolstenholme Square ===
Wolstenholme Square was built on land owned by the Wolstenholme family. In the 18th century, it was a dwelling-place for some of Liverpool's most prosperous merchants with extensive views of the River Mersey and the Wirral Peninsula. At the time, the neighbourhood was seen as fashionable. In more recent times, the square witnessed significant changes during the final decades of the 20th century and beginning of the 21st century. During the late 1980s, the square suffered from post-industrial dereliction and abandonment and was characterised by rundown warehouses. From the 1990s and in to the 2000s, it accommodated nightclubs and raves at the height of dance and electronic music, such as Nation (the host venue of global clubbing brand Cream), Pleasure Rooms, Wolstenholme Creative Space and The Kazimier club. From the 2000s, changes in the overall landscape of the Ropewalks area led to more residential properties being built and in 2016, the nightclubs were closed and bulldozed to make way for regeneration. A new neighbourhood of residential apartment blocks and commercial units were then built on Wolstenholme Square. However, Kazimier Garden continues to operate in the immediate vicinity as a bar and garden on the adjacent Seel Street, whilst the Kazimier itself moved to the Invisible Wind Factory in the north docks of Liverpool city centre. At the centre of the Wolstenholme Square stands the art sculpture known as 'Penelope'.

=== Other streets ===
Other notable streets in the district include Slater Street, Fleet Street and Wood Street, which are critical to Liverpool's nightlife scene today. Duke Street is home to numerous food and drink establishments, as well as boutique hotels.

== Location ==
Ropewalks is located adjacent to Liverpool city centre's main retail area and is bounded by Hanover Street, Back Bold Street, Leece Street, Roscoe Street, Hardy Street, Nelson Street, Upper Pitt Street, Kent Street, Lydia Ann Street, Cleveland Square, Price Street and Hanover Street. At the northern edge is Liverpool Central railway station, at the eastern edge is the Church of St Luke, Liverpool ('Bombed-out church'), to the south east is Great George Street Congregational Church ('The Blackie') and on the eastern edge is Lydia Ann Street.

According to Liverpool's most recent Local Plan, Ropewalks has been set aside by Liverpool City Council for creative and digital businesses, entertainment, nightlife, residential, small-scale shops and services, leisure, hotels, cultural facilities, restaurants and offices.

== List of notable landmarks ==
- Blue Angel (nightclub)
- Casartelli Building
- Church of St Luke, Liverpool ('Bombed-out church')
- City of Liverpool College (Duke Street and Roscoe Street)
- Epstein Theatre
- FACT Liverpool
- Great George Street Congregational Church ('The Blackie')
- Liverpool Central railway station
- Liverpool Royal Institution
- News From Nowhere (bookshop)
- St Peter's Roman Catholic Church
- The Jacaranda (Jacaranda Records)
- The Lyceum
- The Whitehouse

== See also ==
- Cream (nightclub)
- Korova (Liverpool)

== Gallery ==
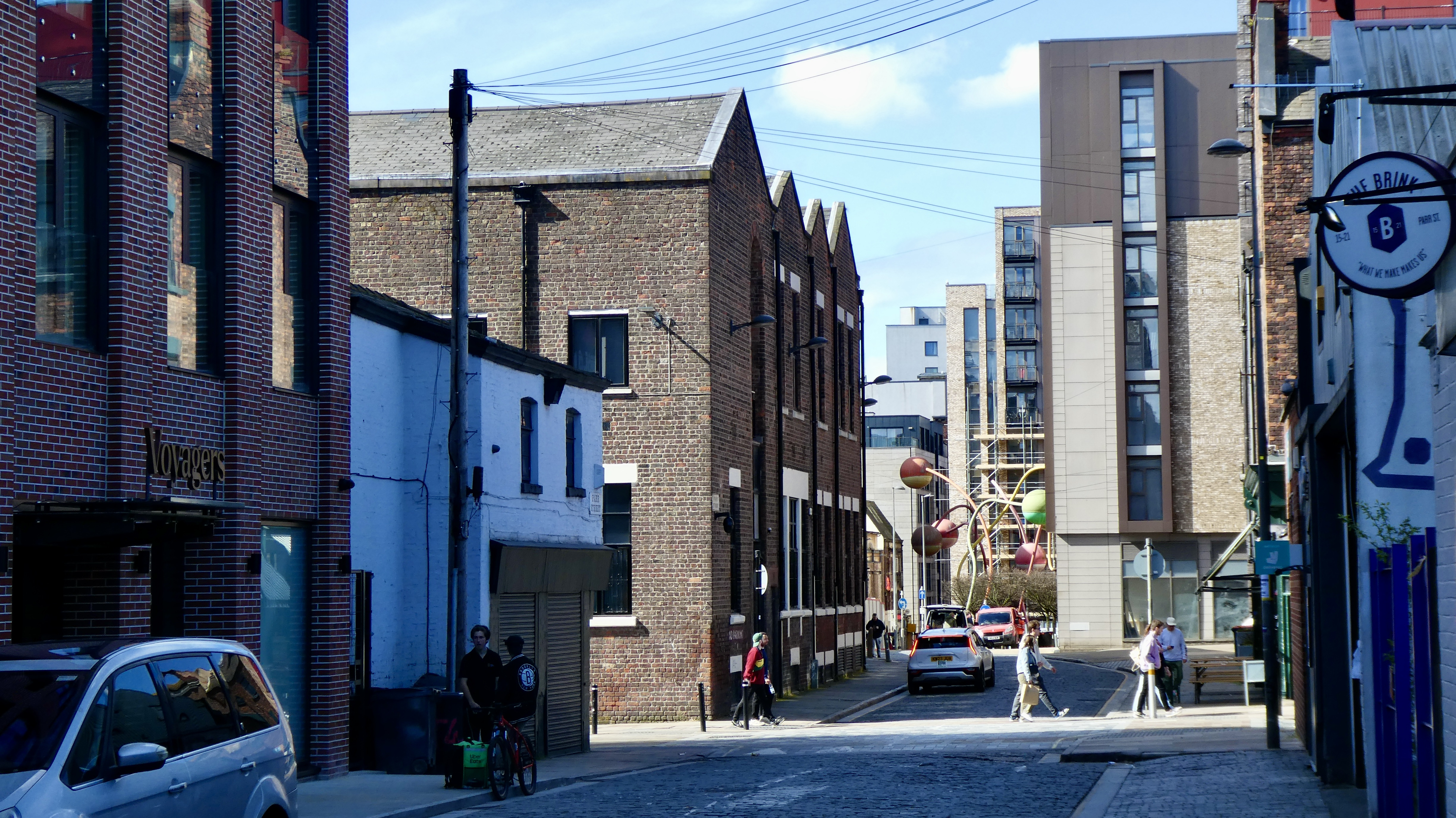
Parr Street

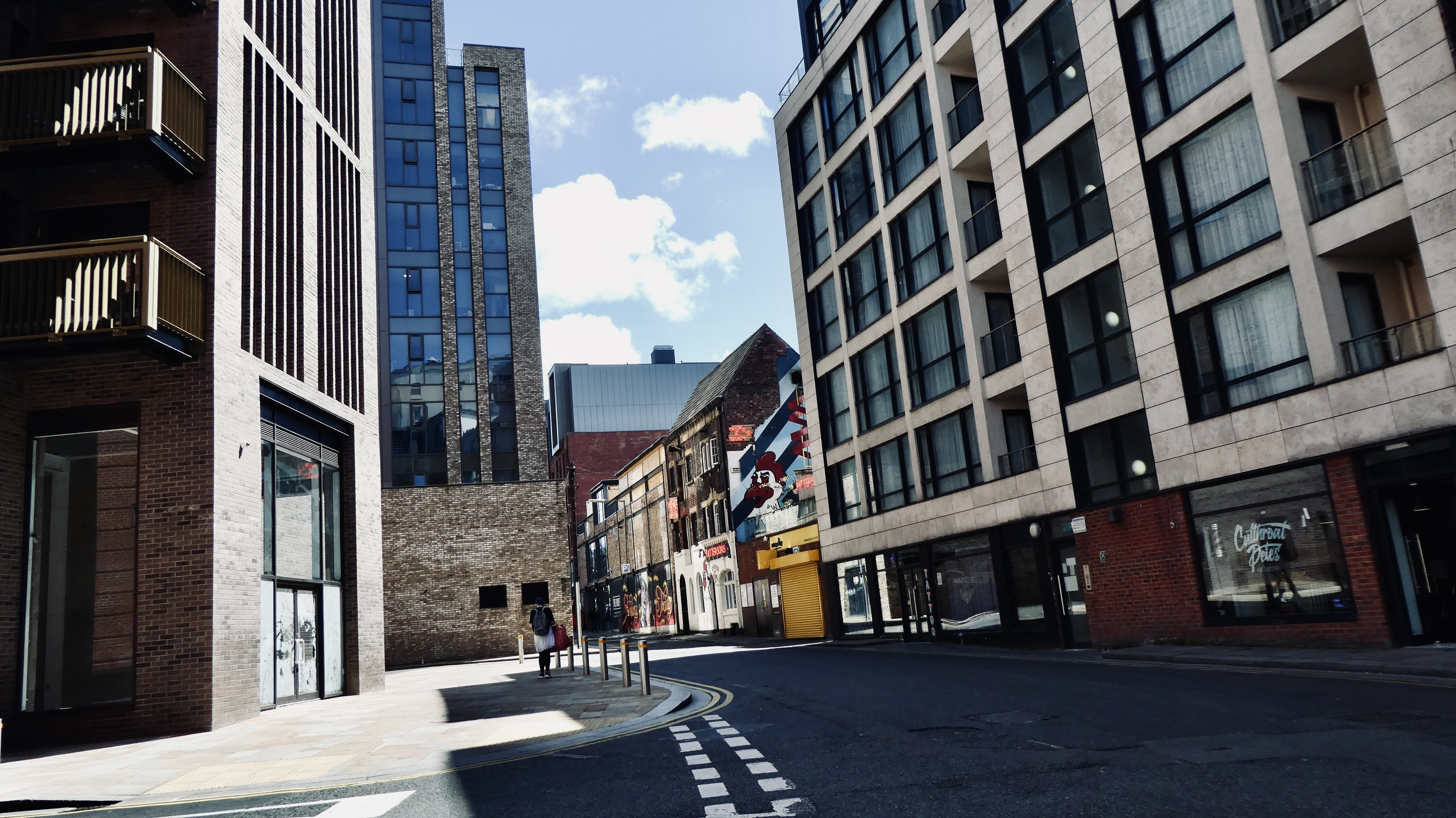
Gradwell Street

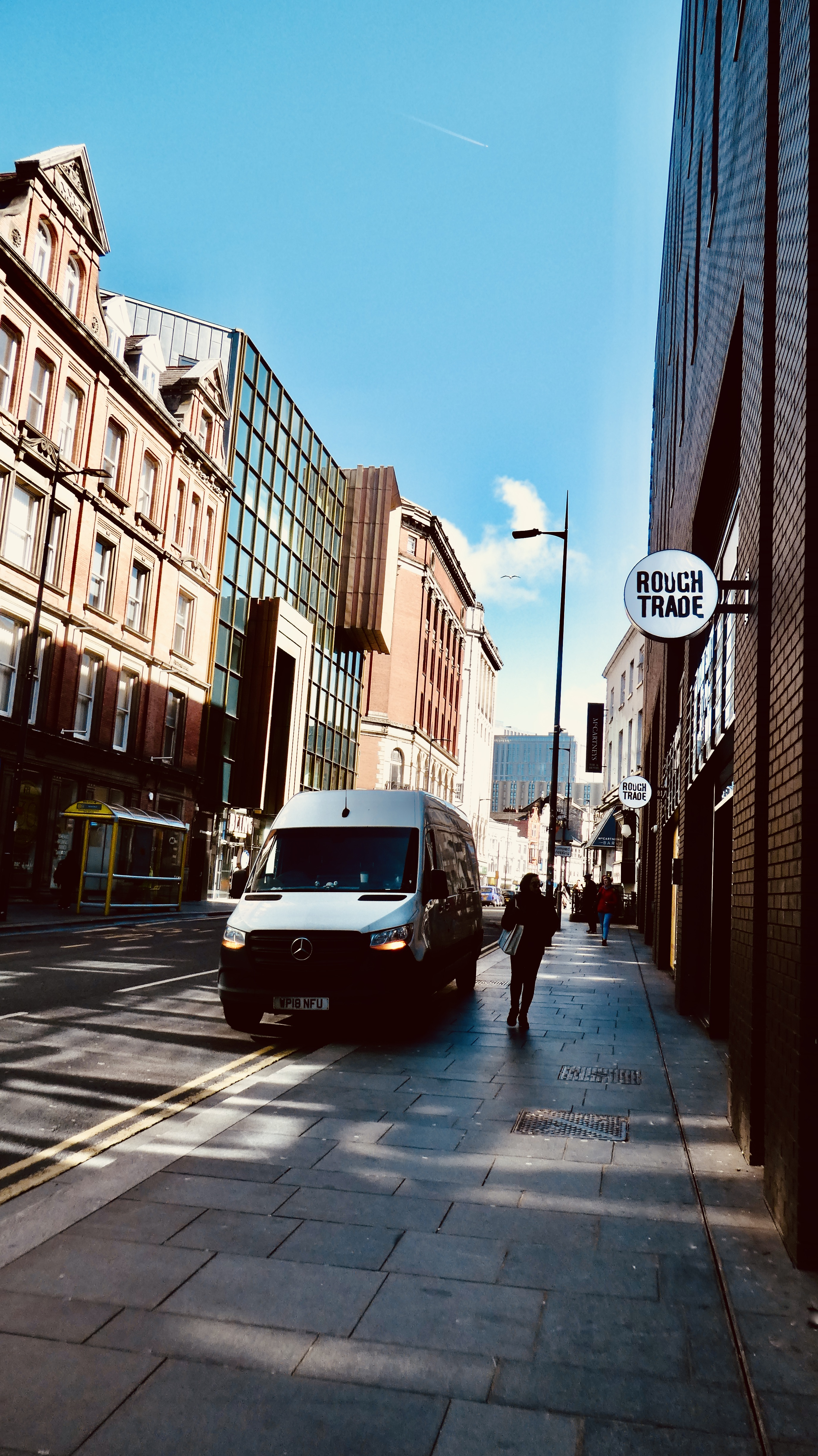
Hanover Street

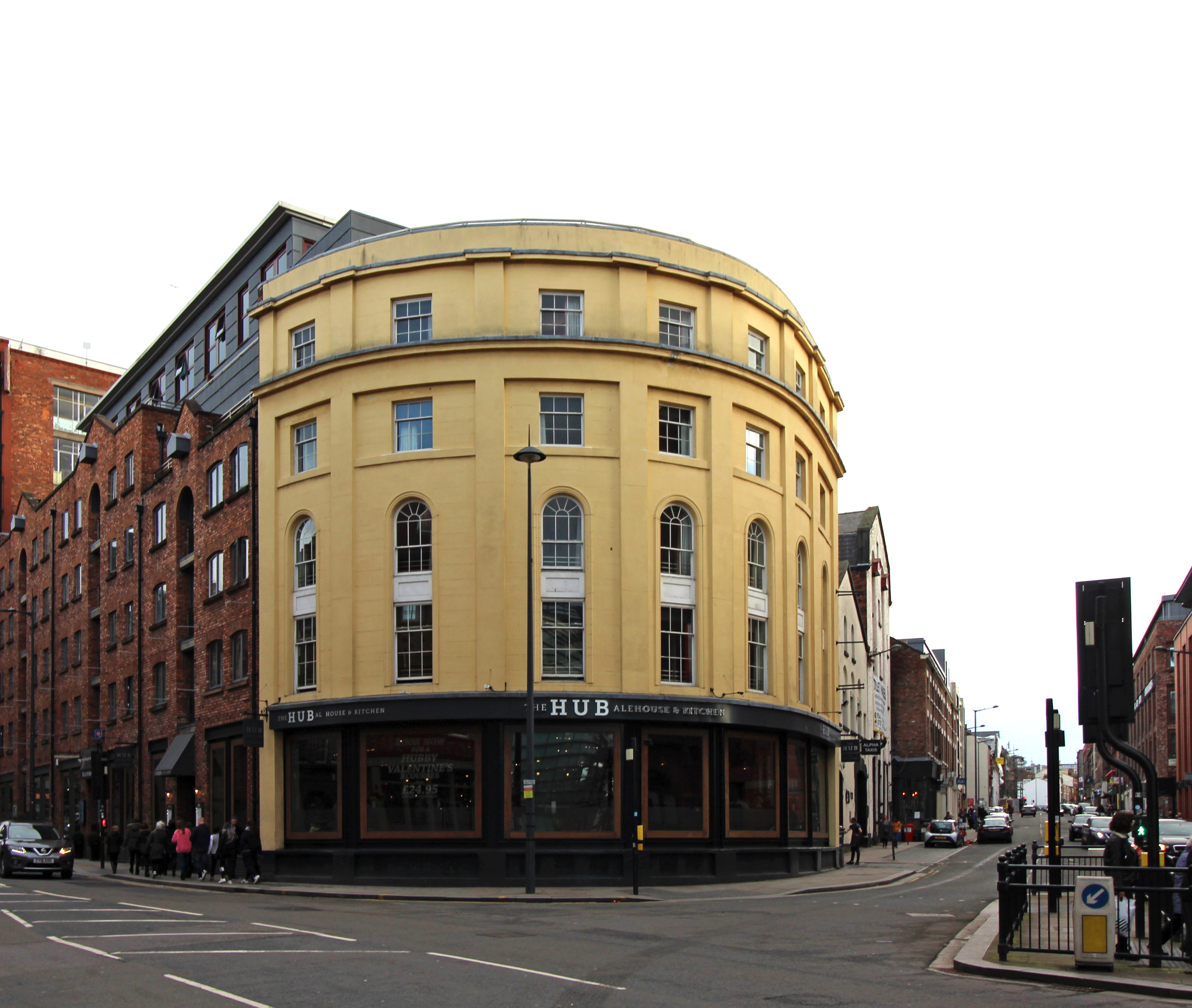
Corner of Duke Street and Hanover Street

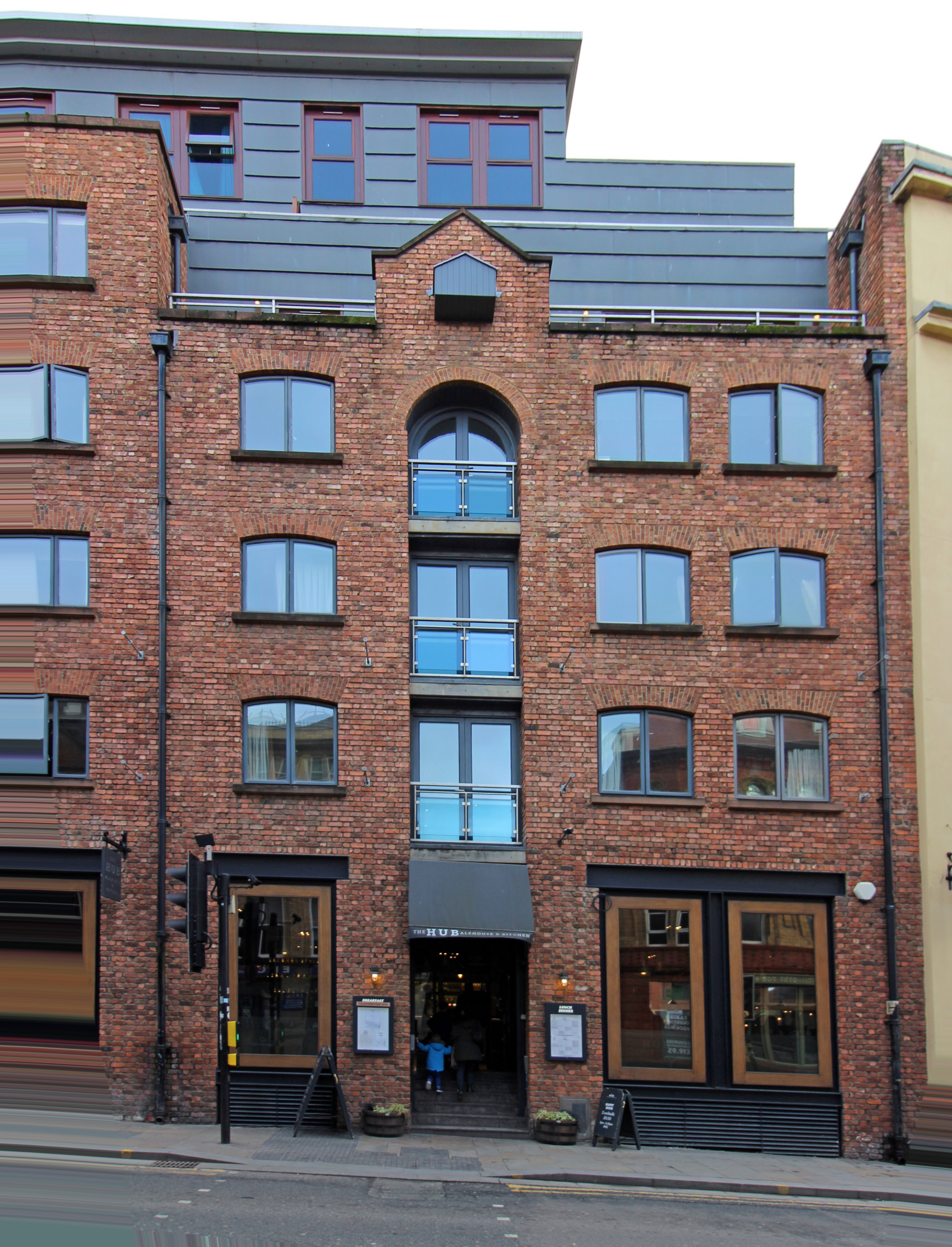
24 Hanover Street

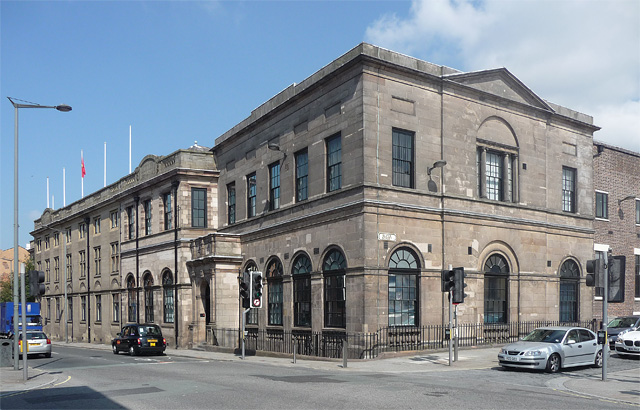
Union News Room

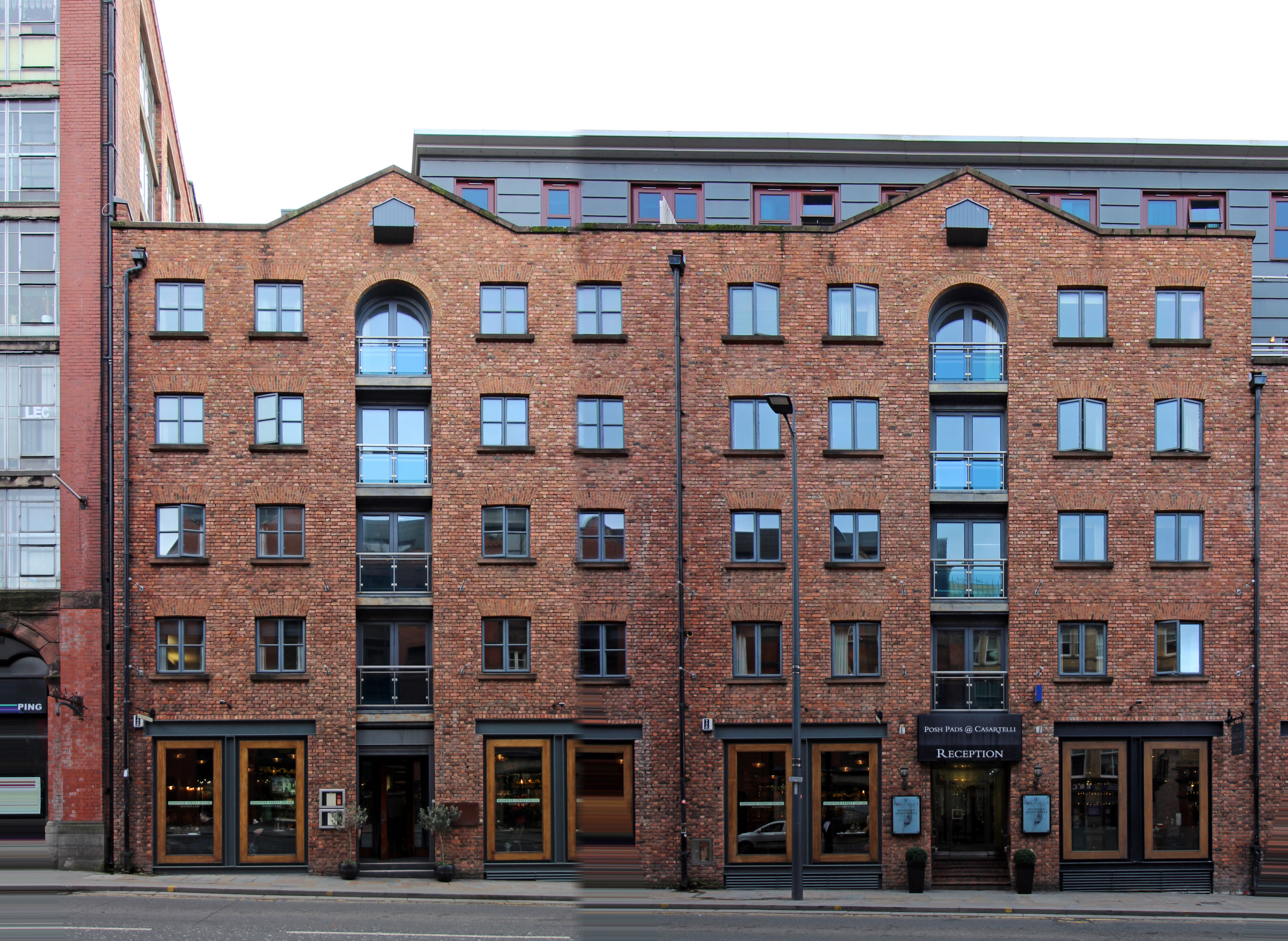
26 - 30 Hanover Street

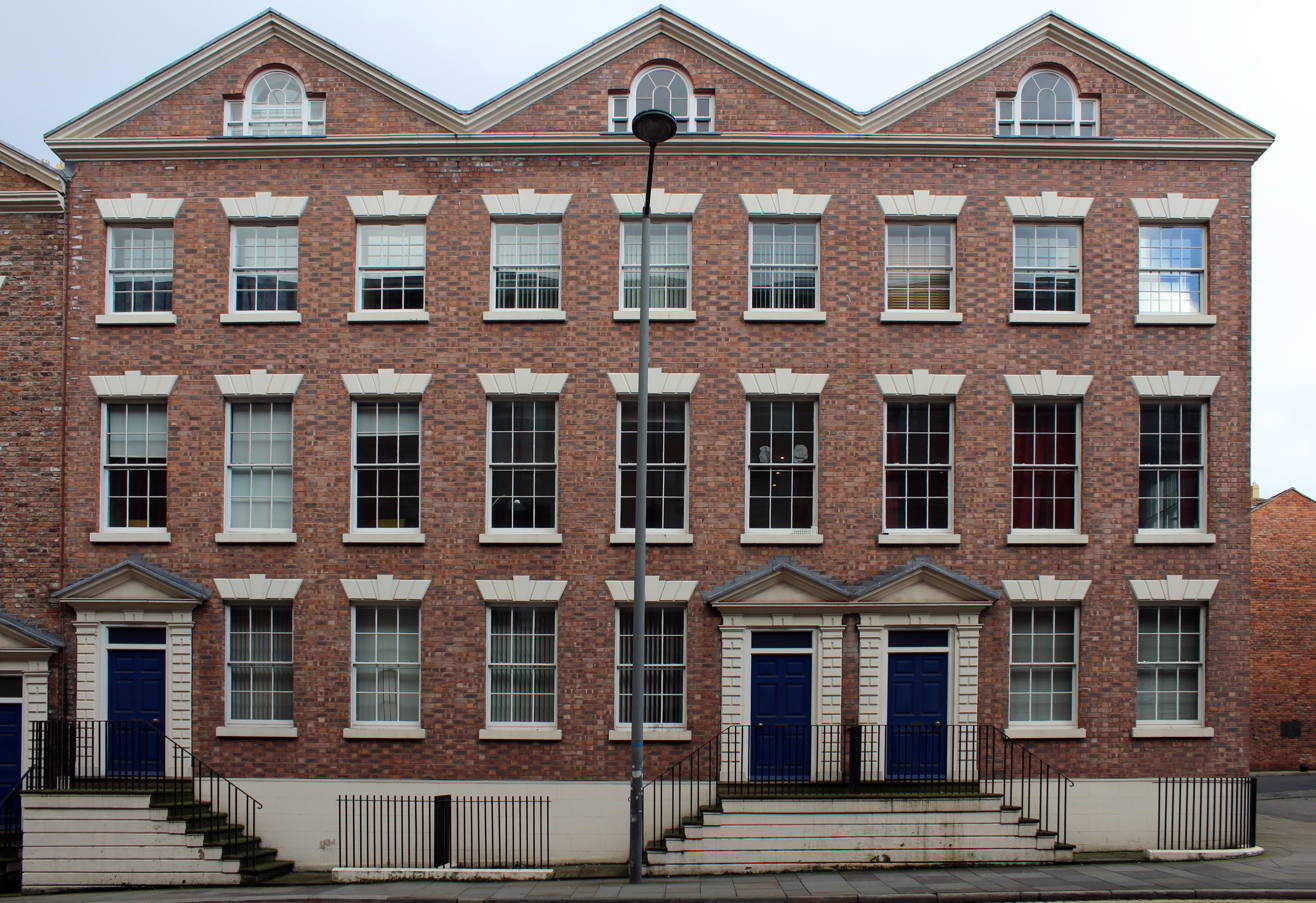
167 - 171 Duke Street, Liverpool 1.jpg

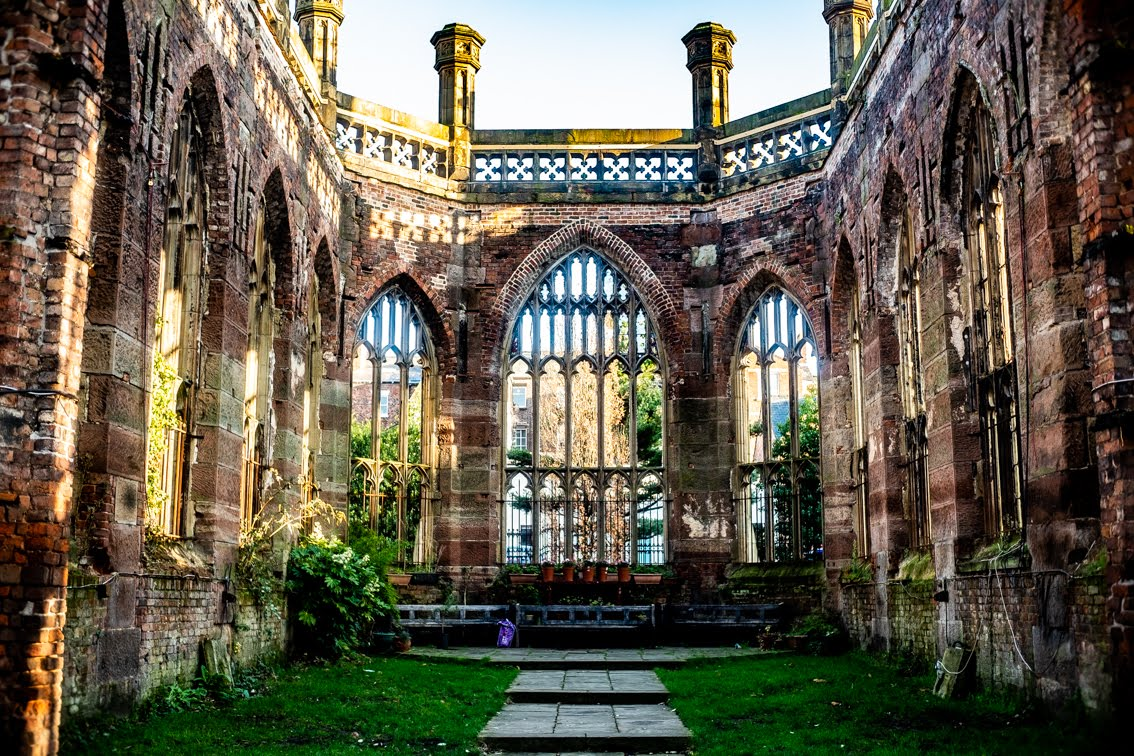
The 'Bombed-out church'

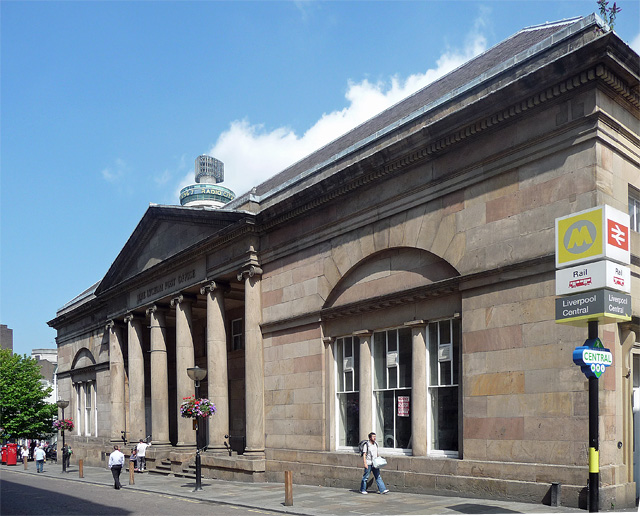
The Lyceum, Bold Street

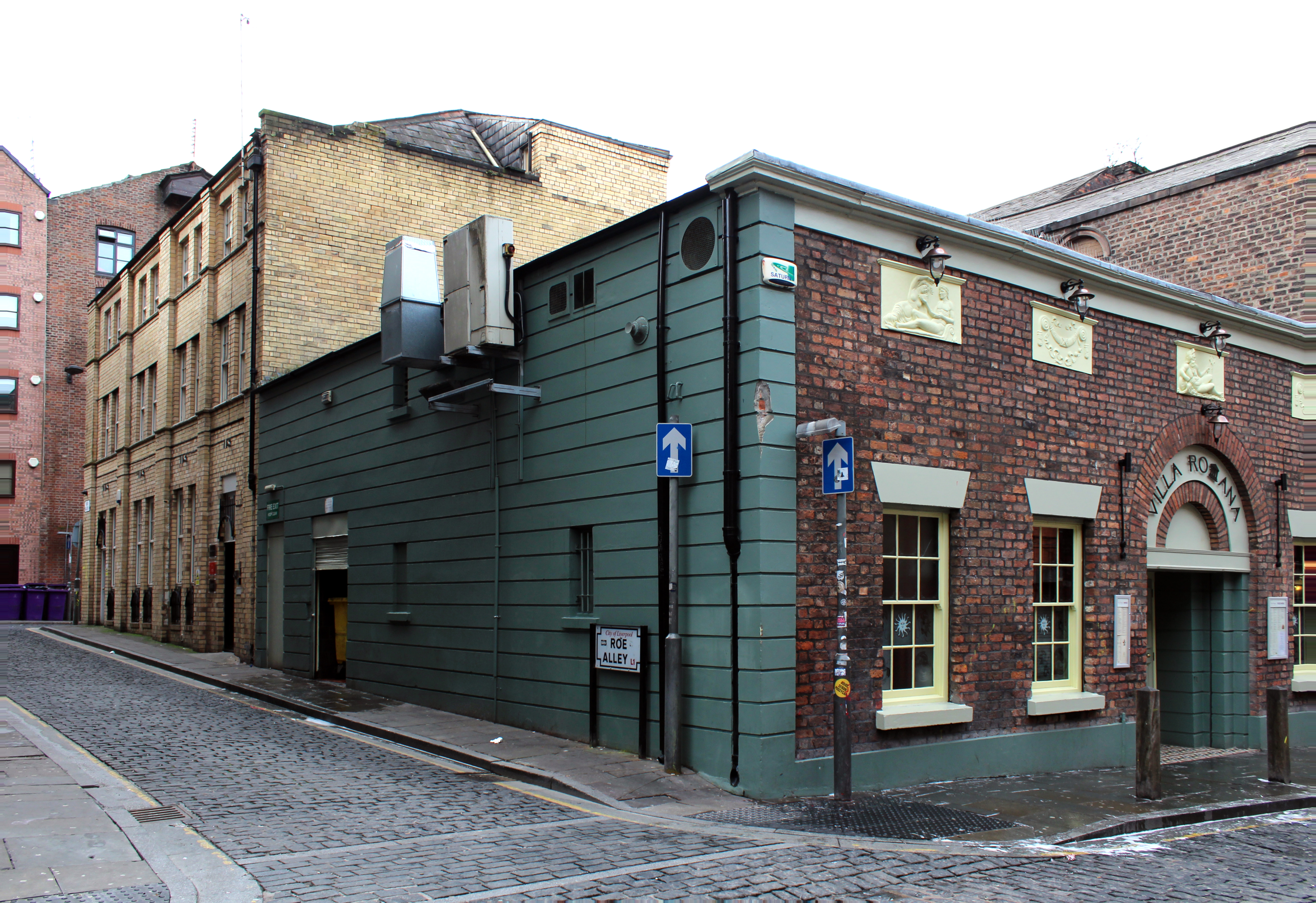
Wood Street

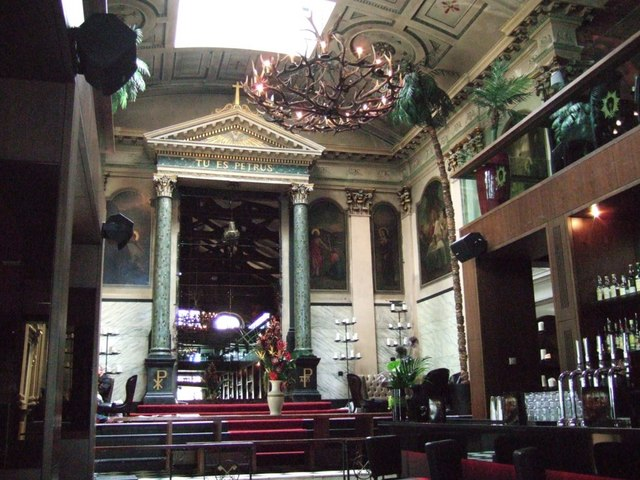
Alma de Cuba

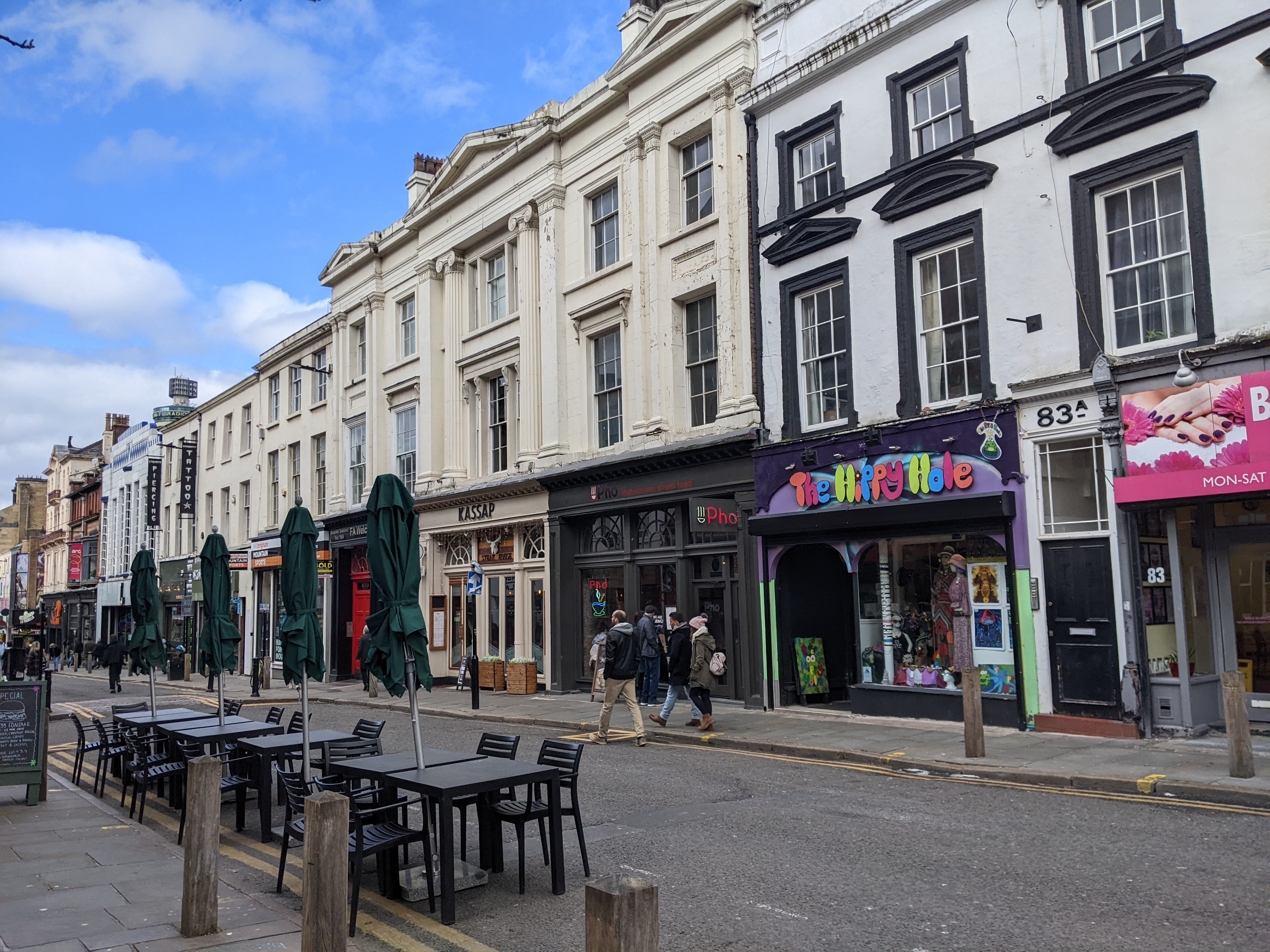
Bold Street (top)

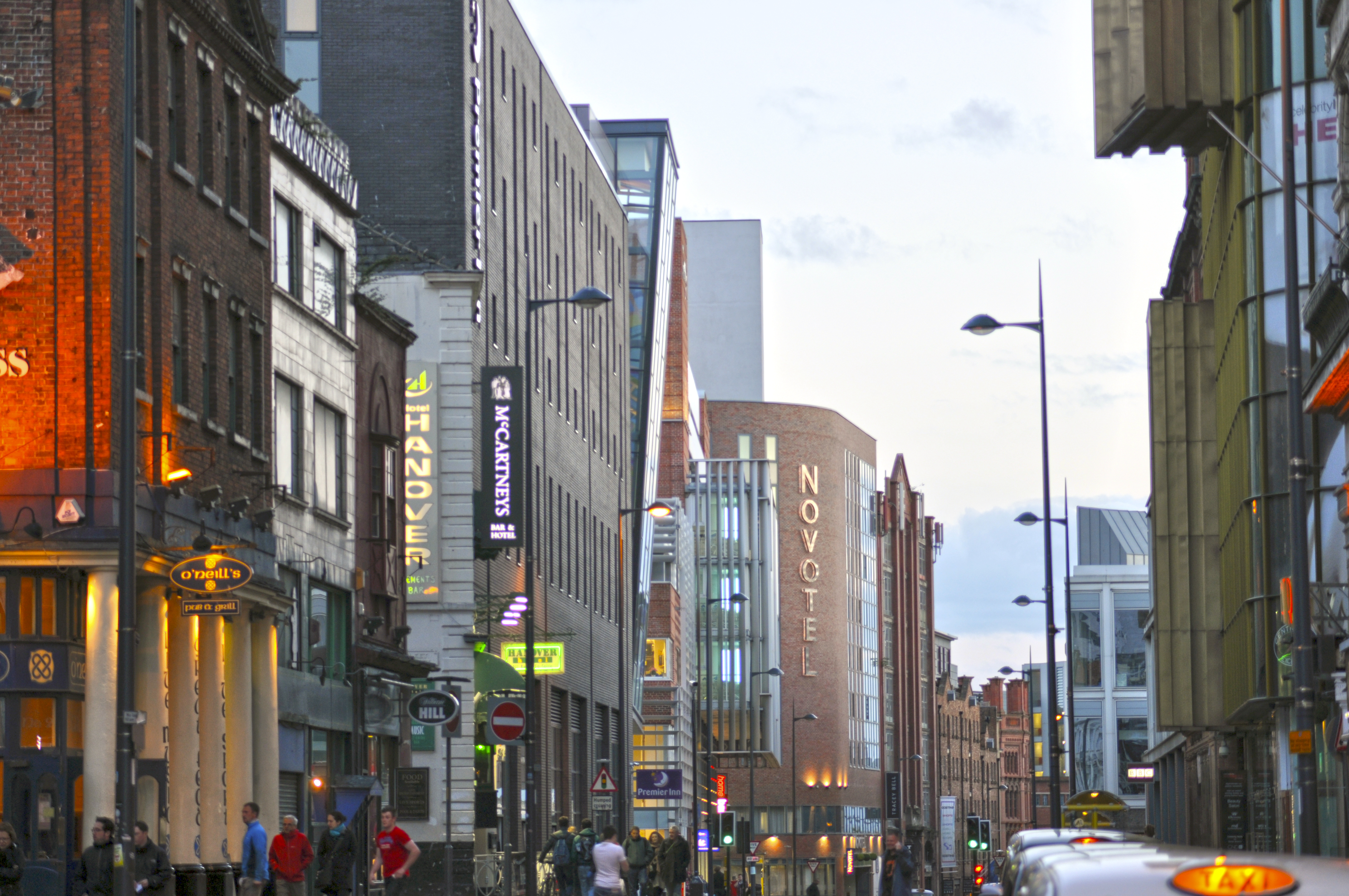
Hanover Street marks the boundary of RopeWalks

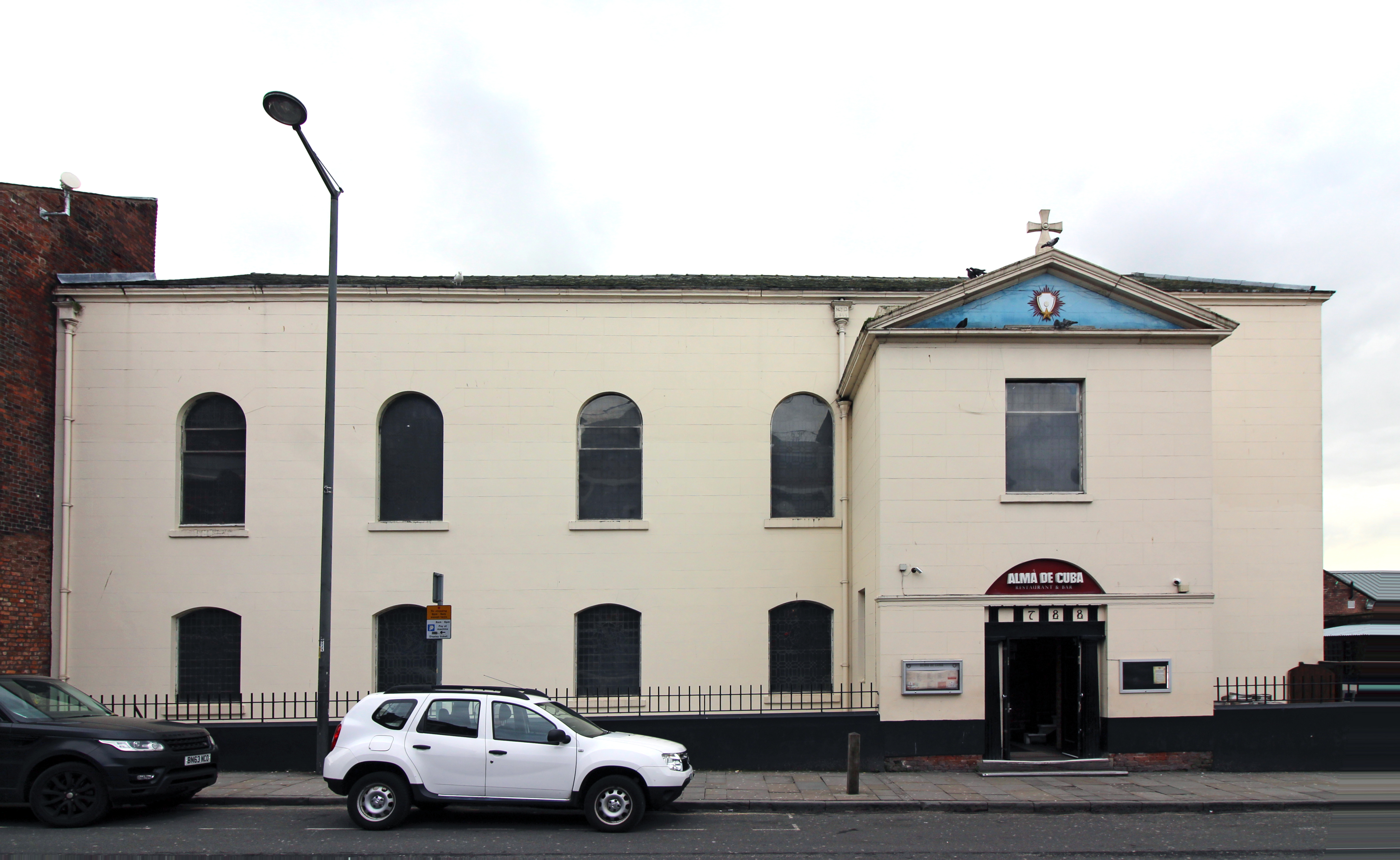
St Peter's, Seel Street
