= Jonathan Binns =

British abolitionist

Jonathan Binns (1747–1818) was an English Quaker and abolitionist, one of only two signatories from Liverpool who signed a 1783 parliamentary petition calling for the abolition of slavery.

== Life ==
Binns was born in 1747 to leather seller Johnathan Binns (1718–1794) and Eliz Sutcliffe (1719–1748). Having trained under his maternal uncle as an apothecary, he worked as a chemist for a short while before pursuing a degree in Edinburgh in 1772. Returning to Liverpool to practice medicine, he married Mary Allbright (1748–1833) and built his home on Bold Street. The couple had two children.

In 1783 at an annual meeting in London of members of the Religious Society of Friends, Binns signed a petition submitted to parliament requesting an end to the exportation of slaves by officers of the Royal African Company. Of the 273 Quakers who signed, only Binns and ship merchant William Rathbone IV were from Liverpool, a city which by 1795 was handling over 40% of the entire European slave trade. Binns' opposition to slavery did not go unnoticed in the city, making him an unpopular character and the subject of plots against his life.

Leaving Liverpool at the height of his career, possibly due to his views on slavery, he became an honorary superintendent of the Quaker Ackworth School and later retired to Lancaster where he continued to practice until his death in 1818.
