= News from Nowhere (bookshop) =

Women's co-operative in Liverpool, UK

Coordinates: 53°24′09″N 2°58′39″W

News From Nowhere Radical & Community Bookshop
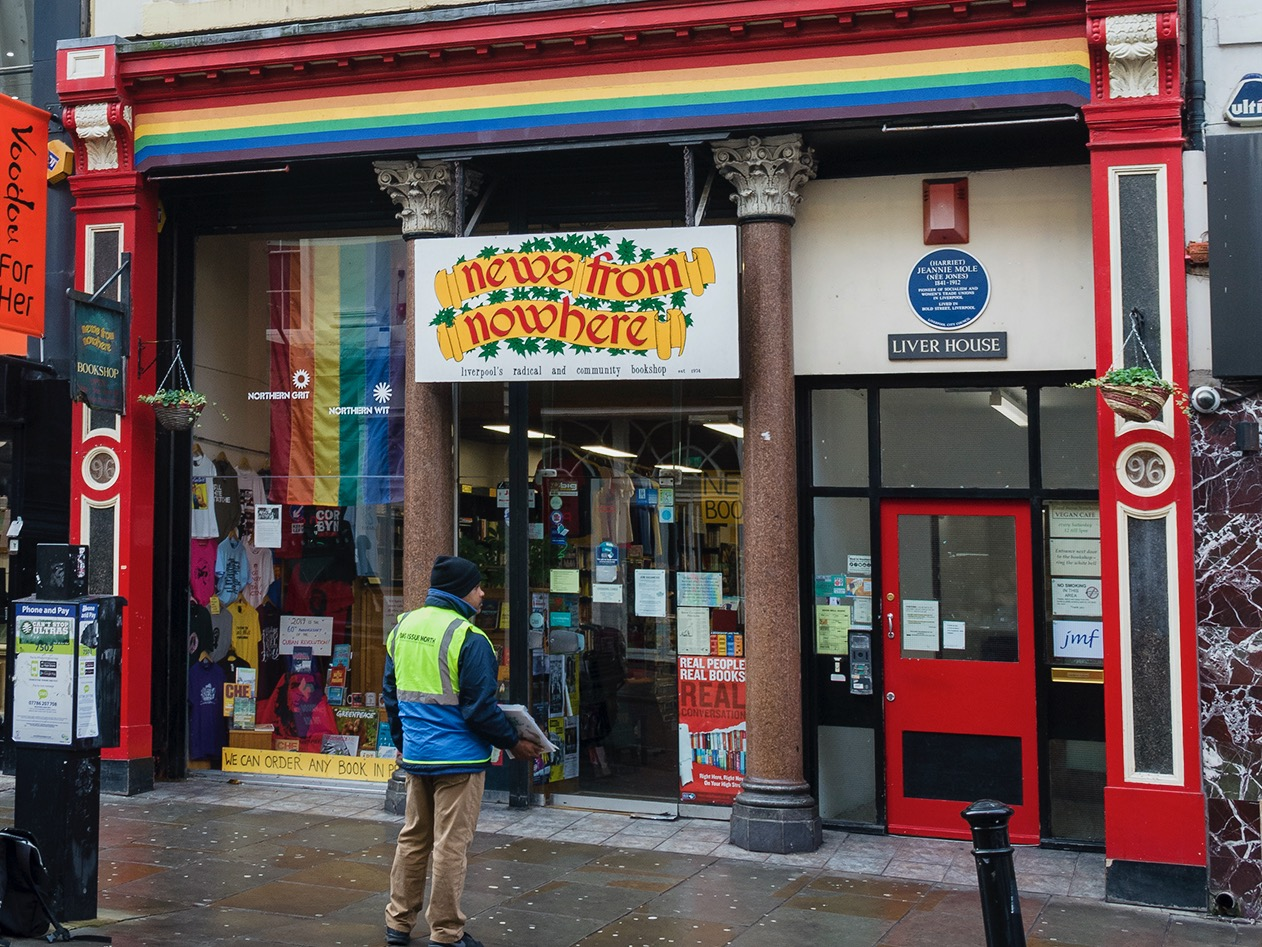
- Type: Co-operative
- Industry: Retail bookshop
- Founded: 1974; 52 years ago
- Founders: Bob Dent; Maggie Dent
- Headquarters: Liverpool, England, UK,
- Products: Books
- Website: newsfromnowhere.org.uk

News From Nowhere is a bookshop in Liverpool, England, UK. Founded in 1974, it is a not-for-profit bookstore and since the early 1980s has been run as a women's co-operative. It is named for the 1890 utopian socialist novel by William Morris.

Since 1989, the bookstore has been based on Liverpool's Bold Street. A location that can be described as "a liberal (albeit, slightly gentrified) haven of vegan restaurants and independent outlets falling downhill from St Luke's Bombed Out Church", serving as an ideal home for the bookshop which matches "the bohemian culture of the area".

== History ==
News from Nowhere began in 1974 when Bob Dent came to Liverpool with his wife, Maggie Dent, after participating in student protests and selling radical newspapers while a student at the London School of Economics. They began the shop with a vision of "a shop that sold anything critical or alternative", which was in contrast to the many other left-wing, party-affiliated bookshops that opened throughout the 1960s. Maggie suggested the bookshop be named after the utopian novel News From Nowhere (1890), by William Morris. The couple agreed on this name "because of its suggestion of retailing news and ideas from no one particular source".

The bookstore moved four times, before finding its permanent home on Liverpool's Bold Street, and its current location was only able to be purchased through the "enormous public response" from the Liverpool community that allowed it to reopen in 1996. Since the 1980s, after the departure of the bookstore's founder, Bob Dent, News From Nowhere has been run as a women's co-operative.

== Community involvement ==
Since its founding, News From Nowhere has been an active member of their Liverpool community, hosting events focused on educating and engaging those around them.

The shop hosts events celebrating famous moments and anniversaries such as Karl Marx’s 200th birthday and hosts authors. Andrea Dworkin, a radical lesbian feminist held a book signing in one of the previous locations for her book Intercourse in 1988. At the opening of their current location, NFW hosted author and comedian Alexei Sayle in 1996.

Additionally, the building is used as a community space by various organizations, including Food From Nowhere, a donation-only vegan cafe. Longstanding staff member Mandy Vere explains: "We've had a lesbian mothers group, we've had a working-class women writers group, we've had a survivors of sexual violence group. We've hosted local neighborhood campaigns against rapacious landlords, the local HIV and AIDS support group."

== Co-operative ==
Since the 1980s, after the departure of the bookstore's founder, Bob Dent, News From Nowhere has been run as a women's co-operative. Following the International Co-Operative Alliance's definition of a Co-op, the bookstore transformed from a single owner to a "jointly-owned and democratically controlled enterprise". The store now embraces a non-hierarchical structure with a focus on collective decision-making. Each employee is a business member, all of which earn equal pay no matter how long they have been working for the shop.

This co-operative system allows for each worker to be a member and run their business how they deem worthy. This system directly pertains to their involvement in the community, specific product endorsements, as well as the distribution of profits.

== Legacy ==
News from Nowhere was founded in the "heyday of the Women's Liberation Movement", which could be seen through the rapid establishment of collective-run "radical bookshops", such as News from Nowhere, Sisterwrite, and First of May. During this time, bookshops served the women's movement – making available prominent texts of the movement, pitching feminist ideals to a larger demographic and "facilitating its social networks and intellectual exchanges", historian Lucy Delap explains. However, by the mid-1980s, the amount of independent, radical bookstores began to rapidly decline.

In the 1980s, News from Nowhere and many other radical bookstores faced multiple attacks from right-wing extremists who disagreed with the media they circulated. Through donations from the Liverpool community and a loan from The Co-operative Bank, News from Nowhere was able to purchase their current address. This lessened the issue of "rising rents and business rates" that many independent bookstores faced, although the rise in "online book-buying" is still a prominent worry.
