= Liverpool Social Forum =

The Liverpool Social Forum (LSF) is a fortnightly meeting held in Liverpool, England. It is influenced by the alter-globalisation principles of the European Social Forum (ESF), and a number of Liverpudlians attended the 2004 ESF in London.

In 2005, one focus of activity was preparations for the G8 summit in Scotland. Since 2006, activists have been working towards establishing a social centre in Liverpool city centre, which officially opened on 15 September 2007.

The LSF works collectively and non-hierarchically - no one person or group is in charge. Broadly, participants share a desire to create and live out a fair, peaceful world, free of oppression, where people are more important than profit.

At meetings, Merseyside activists share ideas, skills and resources, while organising events and actions. The agenda is compiled at the start of each meeting, and is open to all.

A weekly vegan cafe is held on a Saturday staffed by members of the collective who sign up and plan the menu autonomously. Much of the meals that are prepared come from ingredients donated by local independent stores.
