= Concert Square, Liverpool =

Square in Liverpool City Centre, England

Coordinates: 53.4033°N 2.9802°W

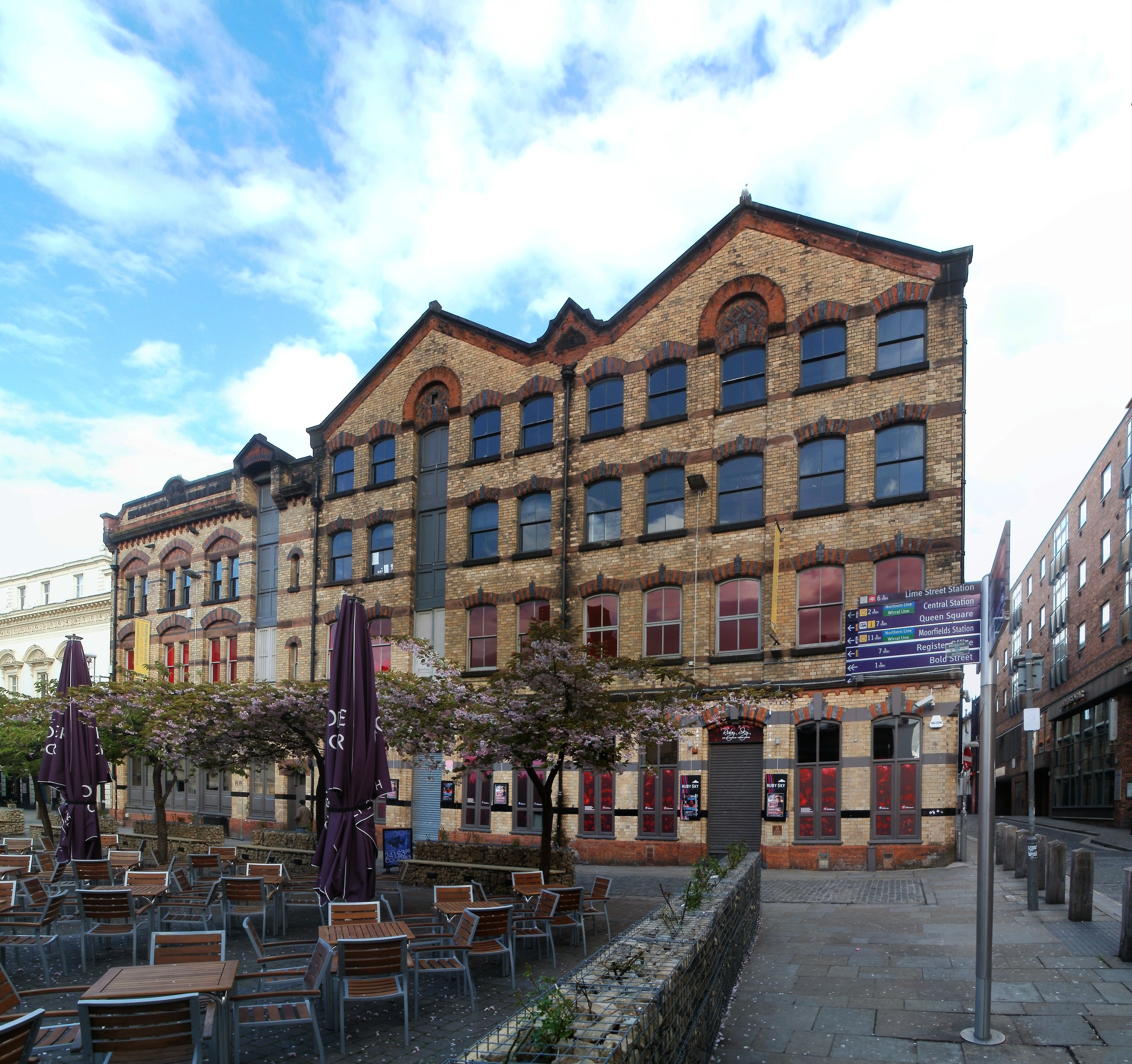
Concert Square, Liverpool, May 2013

Concert Square is a square located between Wood Street and Fleet Street in the RopeWalks area of Liverpool City Centre, England. The square and the immediate surrounding area is often referred to as the heart of Liverpool's nightlife, due to the area being populated with some of the best known nightclubs and bars in the city, and indeed the North West of England. The square has often been a centre for football fans' celebration. A 2019 survey of university students in the UK found two Liverpool universities ranked amongst the top 5 for nightlife, with Concert Square being cited as a factor.

Some of the bars and nightclubs in and around the Concert Square area are:

- McCooleys, Einstein Bierhaus, Level, Soho and Boston Pool Loft, Cheers, Tops Dart Club and Playbox all operated by Pub Invest Group. With Diego's, K1 and nightclubs such as Electrik and Fusion just around the corner of Concert Square.
- A Lloyd's No. 1 Bar, The Lime Kiln operated by Wetherspoons.
