= Martins Bank Building =

Listed building in Liverpool, England

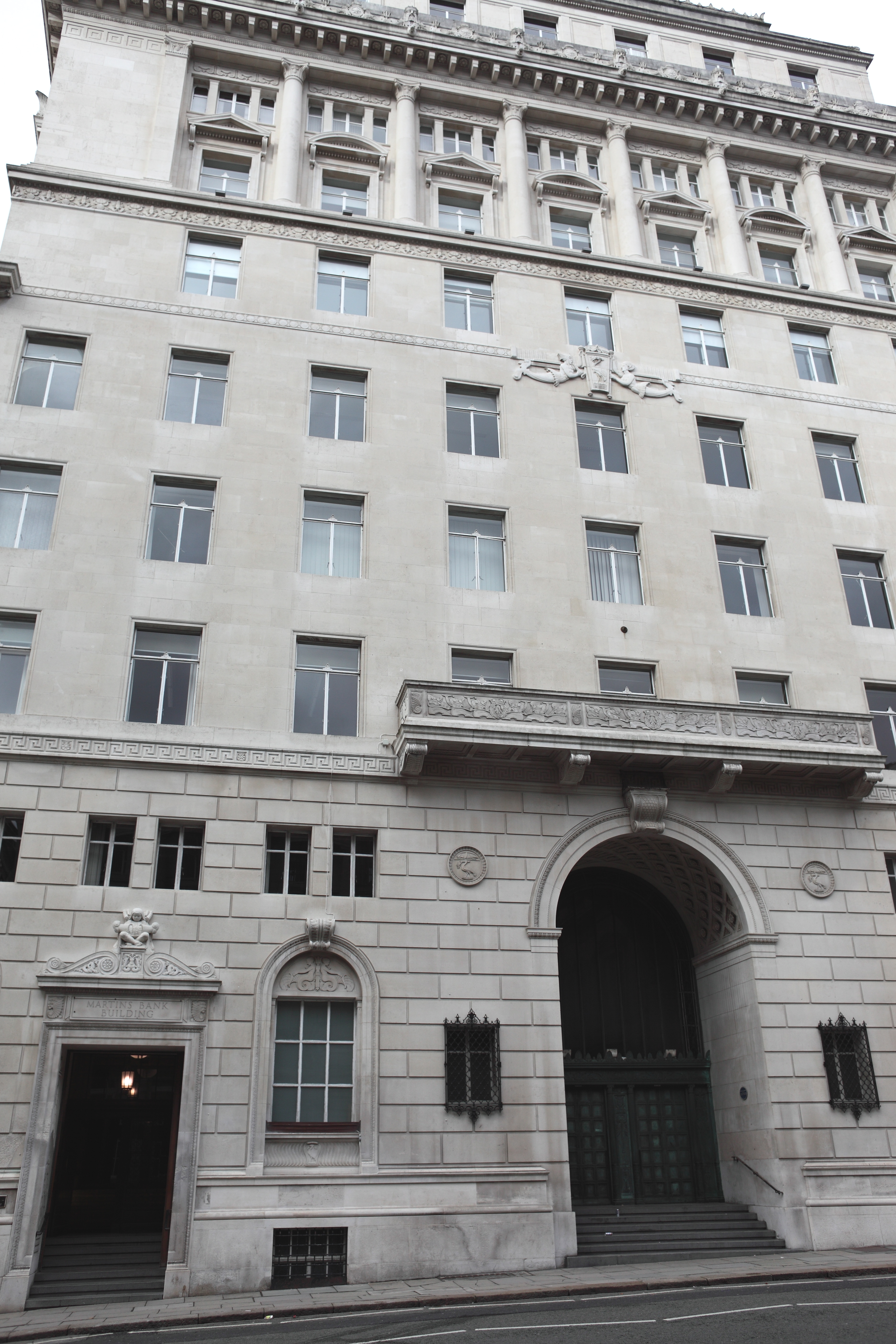
- Interactive map of the Martins Bank Building area

General information
- Type: Bank
- Location: Water Street, Liverpool, England
- Coordinates: 53°24′25″N 2°59′33″W
- Construction started: 1927
- Completed: 1932
- Owner: Martins Bank (1932–1969); Barclays (1969–2009)

Technical details
- Floor count: 7

Design and construction
- Architect: Herbert James Rowse
- Designations

Listed Building – Grade II*
- Official name: Martins Bank Building
- Designated: 12 July 1966
- Reference no.: 1062580

The Martins Bank Building is a Grade II* listed building and former bank located on Water Street in Liverpool, England. Built as the head office of the now defunct Martins Bank, the seven-storey classical style building has been described as one of the country's best examples of an interwar classical building.

Designed by Herbert James Rowse, the bank building opened in 1932 as a replacement for the Bank of England Building which was proving unable to cope with city's increased demand for service. During the Second World War, the bulk of Britain's gold reserves was moved to the bank's vault as part of Operation Fish.

After Martins Bank merged with Barclays in 1969, the absorbed bank continued to operate up until 2009 when the branch was closed. Since then the building has remained empty, though it is currently being refreshed.

== History ==
In 1925 a decision for a new bank to be built in the city was made to relieve demand on the Bank of England Building, which was proving unable to cope. Properties across from the current bank was bought for £220,000 and local architect Herbert James Rowse was tasked with designing the new building which was set to serve as Martins Bank's home office. After five years of construction the building was completed and on 24 October 1932 opened to the public. The bronze doors of the bank and wrought iron work were carried out by H.H. Martyn & Co.

In 1940 under threat of Nazi invasion, 280 tons of the United Kingdom's gold reserves were transported to Liverpool and stored within the bank's vaults ready to be shipped to Canada for safekeeping. The successful operation, code named Operation Fish, was overseen by the bank's Chief Inspector, Donald Devonport Lynch FCIB (1893–1982).

In 1965 the Governor of the Bank of England Lord Cromer, negotiated a deal whereby Martins Bank was merged with Barclays and Lloyds and in 1969 ceased to operate under its original name. The building became a branch of Barclays, retaining some of its original staff and operated for some 40 years before the branch closed in 2009.

Since being vacated by Barclays, plans were announced in 2017 for the unused building to be transformed into the city's first five star hotel. The £50 million plan would have seen the former bank converted into a hotel with over 138 bedrooms, a restaurant and spa. However, no work was started on the scheme and by May 2018 it was announced that the building's owners, Starwood Capital, had sold it as part of a package of 14 properties to a French property company, Foncière des Régions. Immediately after the announcement, 13 of the 14 properties were leased to InterContinental Hotels Group but Martins Bank building was not included in the lease, leading to speculation that it would no longer be turned into a hotel. The building later changed hands and was bought by Kinrise who announced plans in August 2021 that they were planning to undertake a multi-million pound refurbishment to allow the building to once again be used as offices.

Refurbishment work started on the building with a completion date of 2024; however, Kinrise announced they were no longer part of the project in 2024 and the work is now not due to be completed until 2026.

== Gallery ==
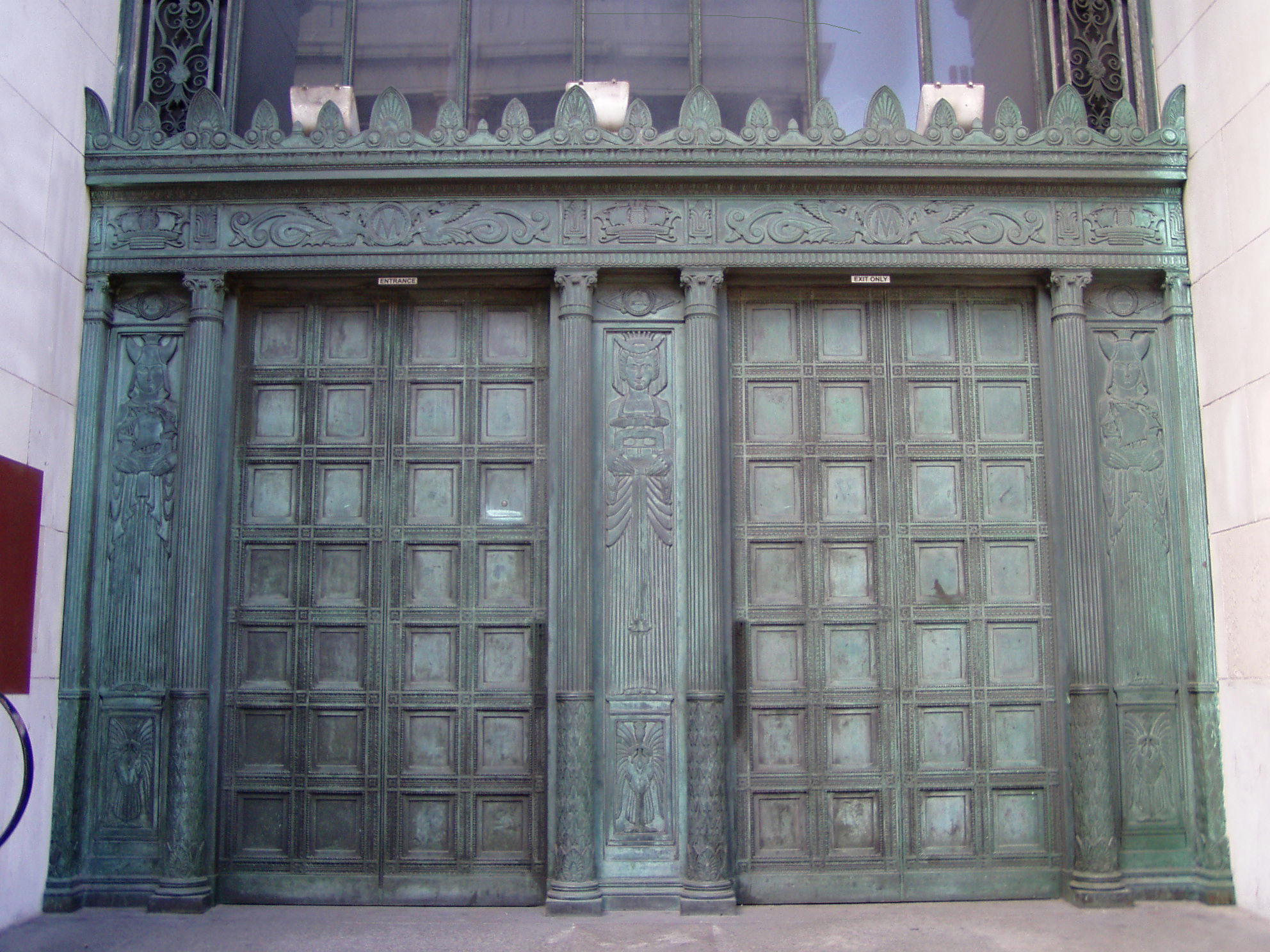
Main entrance

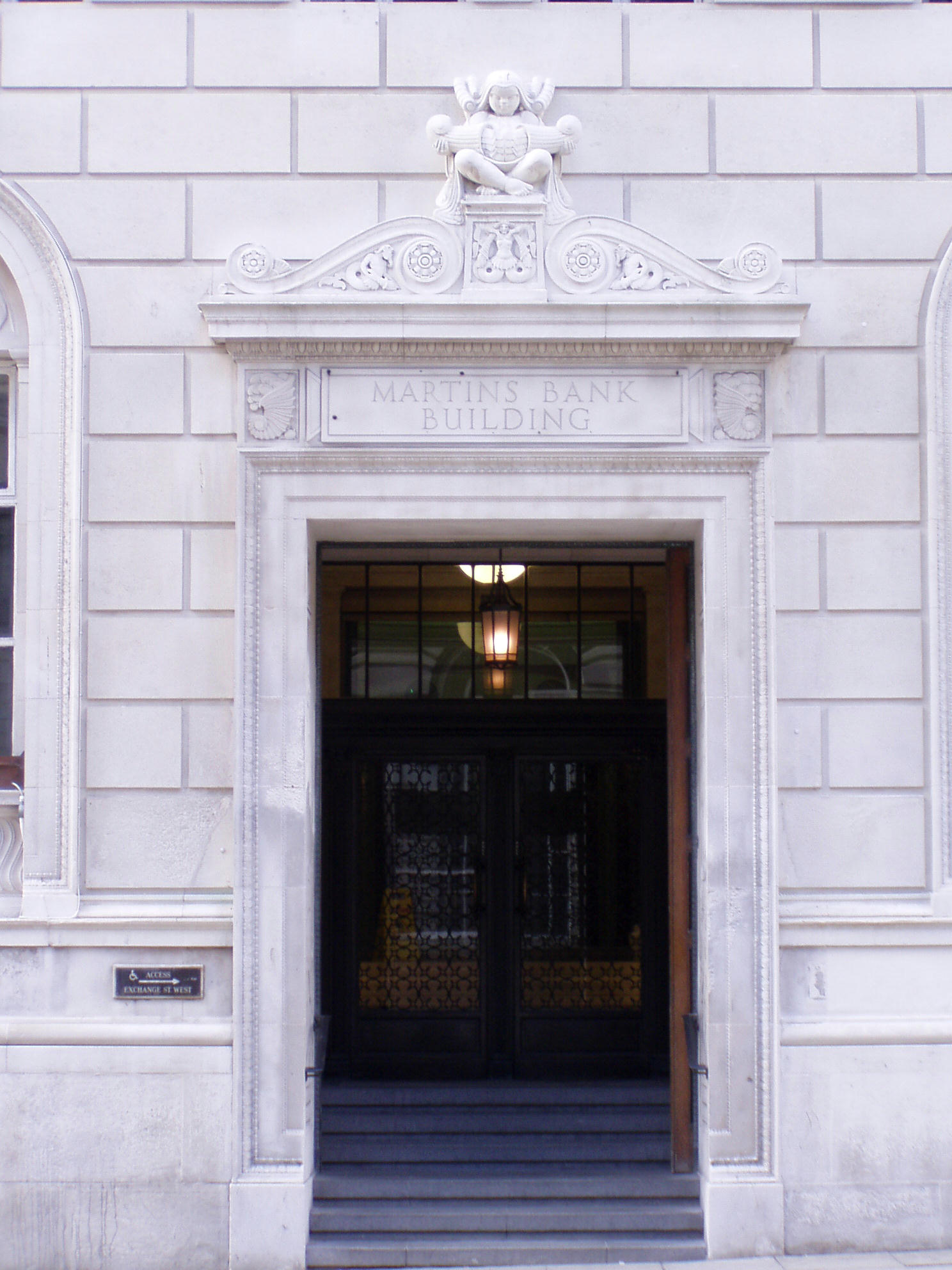
Side entrance

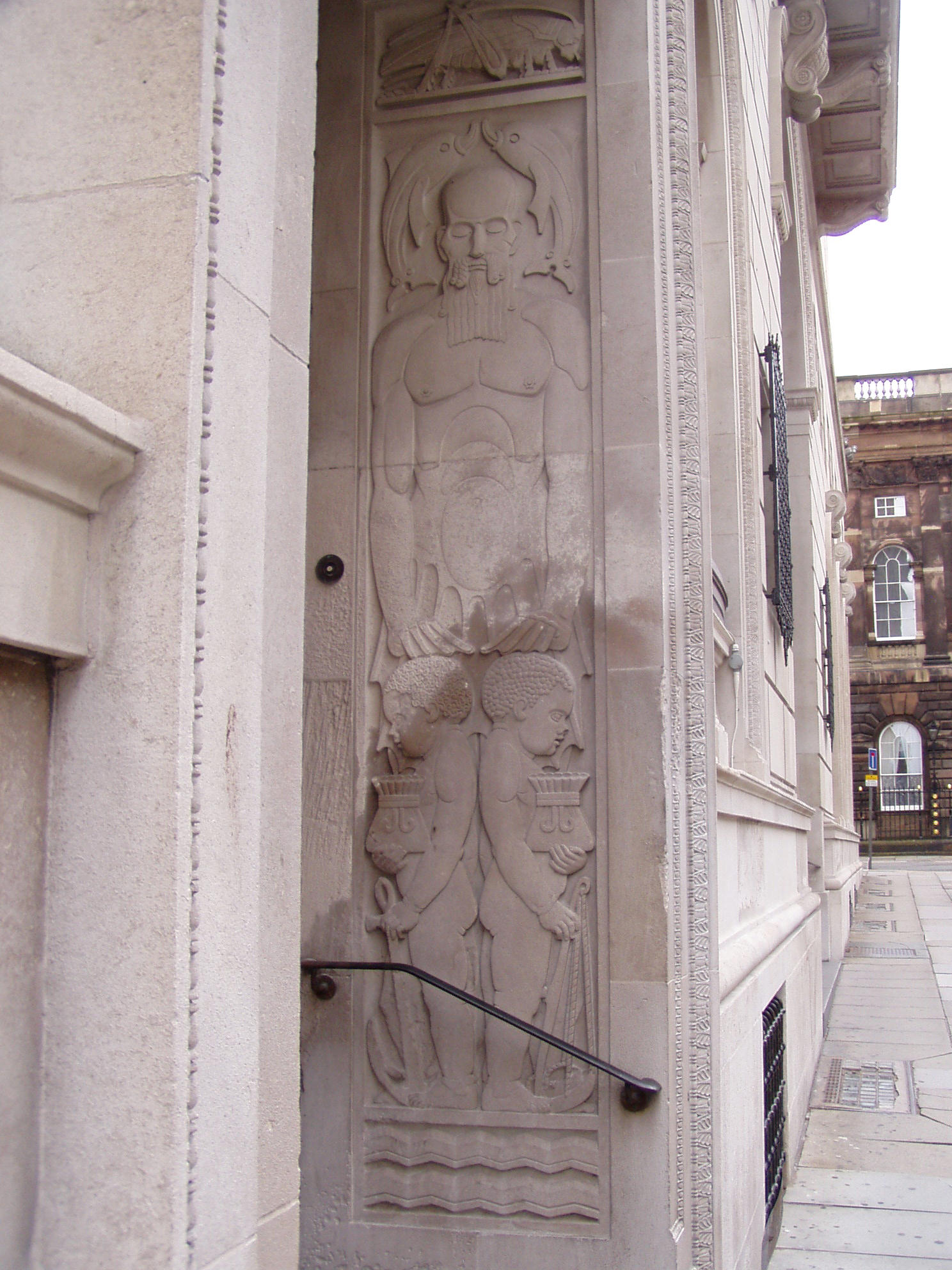
Slave relief

== See also ==
- Grade II* listed buildings in Liverpool – City Centre
