= Hope Street, Liverpool =

Street in Liverpool, England

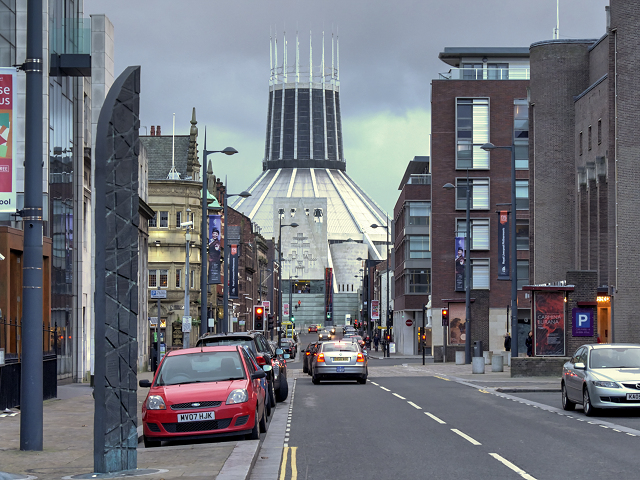
- Looking down Hope Street towards Liverpool Metropolitan Cathedral

- Location within Liverpool
- Namesake: William Hope
- Location: Canning, Knowledge Quarter, Liverpool city centre
- Postal code: L1
- Coordinates: 53.40257°N 2.96985°W

Other
- Known for: Hotels, restaurants, bars, pubs, historic and cultural buildings

Hope Street in Liverpool, England, stretches from the city's Roman Catholic cathedral, past the Anglican cathedral to Upper Parliament Street and it is the local high street of the Canning Georgian Quarter. It contains various restaurants, hotels and bars and is one of Liverpool's official 'Great Streets' and was also awarded 'The Great Street Award' in the 2012 Urbanism Awards, judging it to be the best street in the country. The road runs parallel to Rodney Street. Together with Gambier Terrace and Rodney Street it forms the Rodney Street conservation area.

The years immediately after the Millennium saw the public realm of Hope Street enhanced and the Hope Street area has sometimes been referred to as the Hope Street Quarter.

The street is named after William Hope (1751–1827), a merchant whose house stood on the site now occupied by the Philharmonic Hall.

Hope Street was voted as the best street in the UK and Ireland by The Academy of Urbanism, who awarded it The Great Street 2013.

== History ==
Hope Street was straightened during the 1790s and residential construction commenced around the turn of the century. The Liverpool Philharmonic Hall (home of the Royal Liverpool Philharmonic Society) stands on the corner of Myrtle Street and Hope Street. It was designed by Herbert James Rowse and built between 1936 and 1939. This replaced the original building built 90 years earlier to designs by John Cunningham that burned down in 1933. It is built of brick and is starkly cubic in appearance except for a pair of rounded stair-towers to the front. The first floor windows and main entrance doors have etched glass by Hector Whistler. On Hope Street at the top of Mount Street (where stands LIPA and the former Liverpool Institute for Boys) is the interesting sculpture "A Case History" by John King, 1998. Various items of luggage, cast in concrete, are stacked on the pavement – the labels on the suitcases refer to notable individuals and institutions linked with the local area. Facing the Anglican Cathedral on Hope Street is Gambier Terrace of which numbers 2–10 were built between 1832 and 1837 by the developer Ambrose Lace, to a design in ashlar ad stucco often attributed to John Foster Jr. The terrace was extended between the late 1830s and early 1840s. At the northern end of Hope Street is the Roman Catholic Metropolitan Cathedral and, towards the southern end, the Anglican Cathedral.

== Notable buildings and places of interest ==
- Liverpool Metropolitan Cathedral
- Liverpool Medical Institution
- Liverpool Masonic Hall
- Everyman Theatre
- Philharmonic a Grade II* listed pub
- Statue of Hugh Stowell Brown
- Liverpool Philharmonic Hall
- Hope Street Hotel
- Unity Theatre, Hope Place
- Ye Cracke, Rice Street
- Sheppard-Worlock Statue
- Blackburne House
- Liverpool Institute for Performing Arts (LIPA), Mount Street
- Liverpool College of Art
- Liverpool Cathedral
- St James Mount and Gardens
- Gambier Terrace, running along Hope Street
- Hope Street Unitarian Chapel

== See also ==
- Three Sisters on Hope Street, a 2008 British play by Diane Samuels and Tracy-Ann Oberman that reinterprets Chekhov's Three Sisters, transferring events to Liverpool after World War II.
