= George's Dock Building =

Group of buildings in Liverpool, England

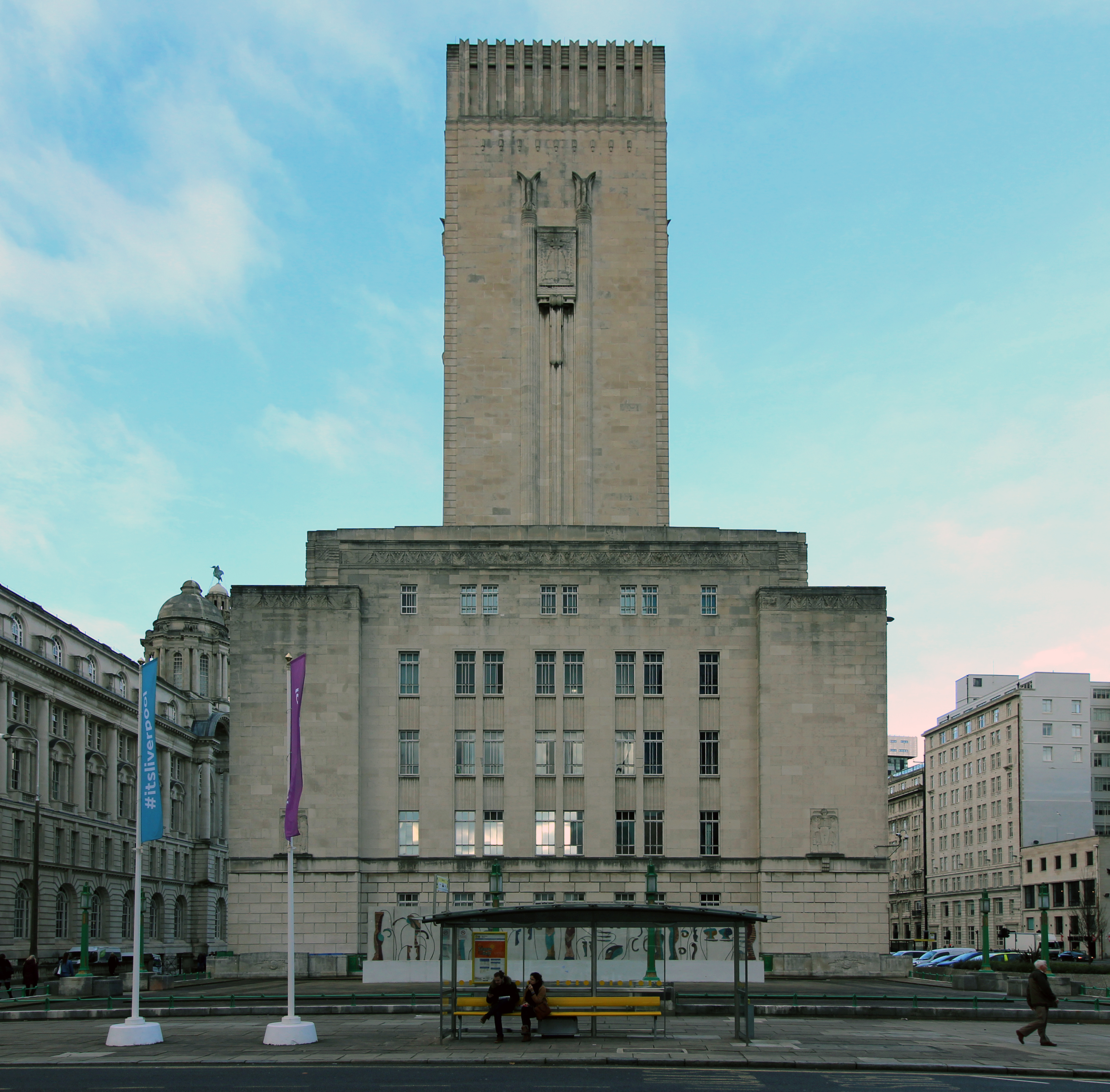
- Viewed from the south side from Mann Island in 2017
- Interactive map of the George's Dock Building area

General information
- Status: In Use
- Location: Mann Island, Liverpool, England
- Coordinates: 53.4064°N 2.9949°W
- Construction started: 1931
- Estimated completion: 1934
- Owner: Merseytravel

Technical details
- Floor count: 4

Design and construction
- Architect: Herbert Rowse

George's Dock Building is a Grade II listed building in Liverpool, England. It is located at the Pier Head on the city's waterfront. It is part of Liverpool's former UNESCO designated World Heritage Maritime Mercantile City. It was built in the 1930s in the Art Deco style, and designed by architect Herbert Rowse. Occupants of the office space include, Merseytravel, the Liverpool City Region Combined Authority, Mersey Tunnels staff and the Mersey Tunnels Police. It also houses ventilation machinery for the Queensway Tunnel and the Mersey Tunnels Tour Offices.

== Building ==
The George's Dock Building was designed by Herbert Rowse, chief architect of the Queensway tunnel, and is the most ambitious of the six buildings constructed to provide ventilation for the 2.1 mile long road tunnel under the River Mersey. The building stands to the east of the Port of Liverpool Building on the reclaimed George's Dock, and is bounded by the Strand to the east, Mann Island to the south, Georges Dock Way to the west and Brunswick Street, beyond which lies the Cunard Building, to the north.

The building takes the form of a square engine house, with extensions north and south rising five double-height storeys containing offices. Above the engine house is the air shaft, a square column rising to the height of the neighbouring Port of Liverpool building. The building is finished in a spare Art Deco style and faced with Portland stone. The exterior has a number of sculptures and a decorative frieze, executed by Edmund Thompson and George Capstick. To the north and south lie two small raised plazas; the north containing one of the original tollbooths from the tunnel, and the south having a modern art decorative fountain designed by Betty Woodman for the 2016 Liverpool Biennial.

== Decoration ==
The building has a number of sculptures and a decorative frieze, depicting aspects of the work in a modernist style. The west façade on Georges Dock Way has the main entrance, flanked by two fluted niches with free-standing sculptures representing 'Day' and 'Night'. Each is just over three feet in height and executed in black basalt. Above the door is the figure of 'Speed, the Modern Mercury', carved in high relief and standing approximately 23 feet from base to top. At the corners of the north and south facades are four bas-relief panels, depicting 'Civil Engineering' and 'Construction' (facing the Mann Island), and 'Architecture' and 'Decoration' (facing the Cunard Building across Brunswick Street). The east façade on The Strand holds a memorial to the 17 men who died during the nine years of the tunnel's construction.

Along the top of the engine house runs the decorative frieze, comprising a repeated geometric pattern flanked at each end by a winged horse. The same design is also used on the North John Street ventilation tower.

On the central tower is a large relief design, repeated each face, comprising a panel depicting Ventilation flanked by two columns capped with a Liver bird.

The George's Dock Building was listed at Grade II (i.e. a building that is of special interest, warranting every effort to preserve it) on 10 October 1980.

== Use ==
The engine house and tower still provide ventilation for the tunnel below, while refurbished offices are now used by Merseytravel, The Liverpool City Region Combined Authority, and the Mersey Tunnel Police.

== Sources ==
- Terry Cavanagh: Public Sculpture in Liverpool (1997) Liverpool University Press ISBN 0-85323-701-8
- Ian Jackson, Simon Pepper, Peter Richmond: Herbert Rowse (2019) Historic England ISBN 978-1-84802-549-3
- Joseph Sharples: Liverpool: Pevsner Architectural Guide (2004) ISBN 0-300-10258-5
