= Hope Street Hotel =

Coordinates: 53.401°N 2.971°W

The Hope Street Hotel on Hope Street, Liverpool, describes itself as 'Liverpool's first boutique hotel'. On 30 and 31 March 2006 it played host to Condoleezza Rice. The hotel is housed in an 1860 Venetian-style palazzo, originally home to and named 'The London Carriage Works', which is how the hotel's restaurant came to be named.

In 2005, Spanish midfielder Xabi Alonso chose to move into the Hope Street Hotel after his transfer to Liverpool FC. His wife, then girlfriend, Nagore Aranburu worked as a receptionist at the Hope Street Hotel as she wanted to improve her English.
