= Liverpool Masonic Hall =

Masonic Hall in Liverpool, England

Coordinates: 53.4027°N 2.9703°W

Masonic Hall, Liverpool

General information
- Type: Masonic Lodge, commercial offices, theatre & drama space.
- Location: 22 Hope Street, Liverpool, England, United Kingdom

Masonic Hall is a Grade II listed building in Liverpool, England. Used as a lodge for Freemasons since 1857, the building is also used by a theatre company and drama academy. There are plans to open a 130 theatre within the building.

== History ==
The Masons have been using the building since 1857. Originally known as the 'House in the Garden' the building was expanded twice; once in the 1870s and again in 1932. There are a series of ornate lodge meeting rooms within the building, some of which are based on themes such as Rome or Egypt. There is a war memorial dedicated to the 190 Masons who died in World War I.

== See also ==
Architecture of Liverpool
