= Blackburne House =

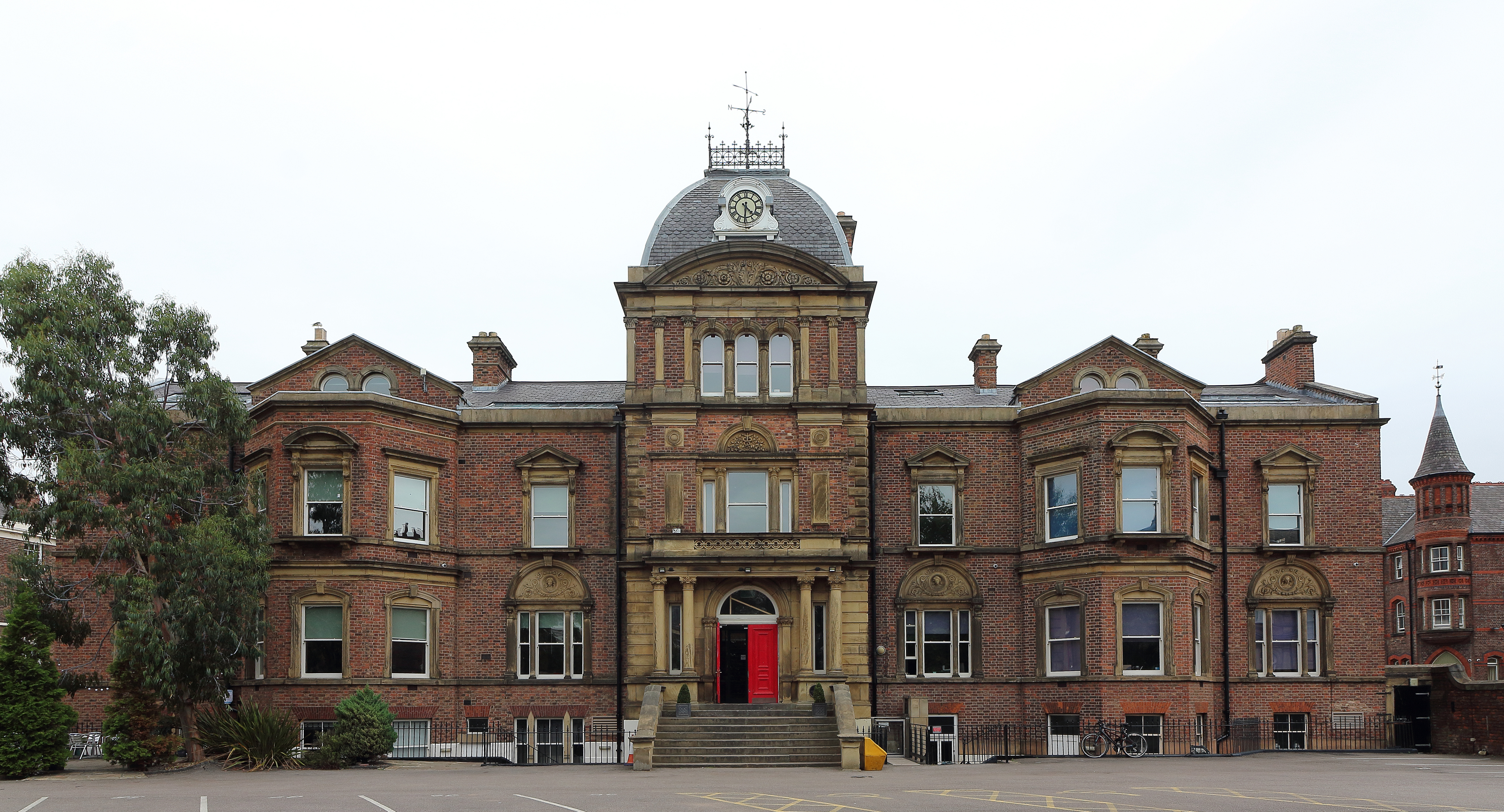
- Blackburne House

- Location in Liverpool
- 53.3999°N 2.9705°W
- Location: Hope Street, Liverpool, Merseyside, England
- OS grid reference: SJ 356 897

History
- Built: 1788, remodelled 1874-76
- Built for: John Blackburne

Site notes
- Governing body: Blackburne House Group

Listed Building – Grade II
- Designated: 14 March 1975
- Reference no.: 1356293

Blackburne House is an 18th-century Grade II listed building located on the east side of Hope Street, Liverpool, Merseyside, England. It was built in 1788 and remodelled in from 1874 to 1876. Originally a private house, it became a girls' school and, after a period of dereliction, it is used as a training and resource centre for women.

== History ==
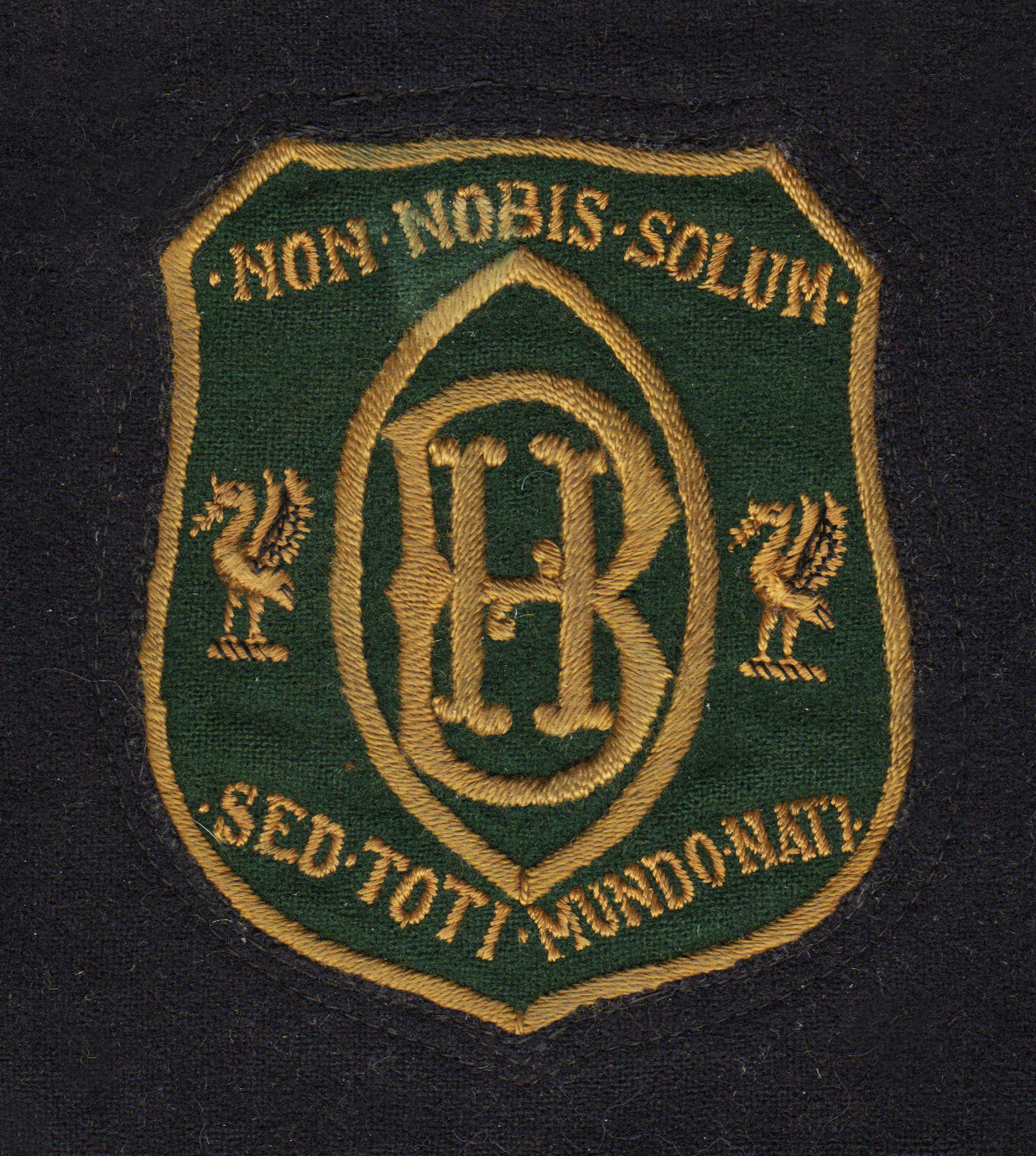
Blackburne House 1930s blazer Badge

The house was built in 1788 for John Blackburne, at a time when this was in the countryside outside Liverpool. Blackburne originally came from Warrington. He was a wealthy salt refiner and a supporter of the slave trade. In 1760 he had been Lord Mayor of Liverpool.

In 1844 the house was bought from Blackburne by George Holt. Holt was a cotton broker and merchant, and an abolitionist. He was also a supporter of women's rights, and on 5 August 1844 he opened the house as Blackburne House Girls' School with a Latin motto which translates as: "Born not for ourselves alone but for the whole of the world." The document setting up the school says "Existing provision for education shows that the middle class of all others has the worst provision for the education of its daughters. The report expressed the hope that the proposed course of instruction should seek to impart solid acquirements rather than showy accomplishments and no definite theological teaching would be attempted". Blackburne House was the first school for girls in Liverpool, and was sited directly opposite the Mechanic's Institution, a school for boys on the other side of Hope Street.^{[A]} Holt was the director and president of the school until he died in 1861, when the school was taken over by the Mechanic's Institute. The building was extended in 1874–76 by W. I. Mason, who added a wing to the north and a central tower.

In 1905 it came under the management of Liverpool City Council, and continued as a school until it closed in 1986.

== Later use ==
The building sat empty for years, except for one art show in 1987. In 1992, it was chosen as the new home for the Women’s Technology and Education College. After raising £4 million for repairs, the building reopened in 1994—exactly 150 years after it first started—to help women learn and succeed.

== Architecture ==
Blackburne House is constructed in brick with stone dressings and a slate roof. It has two storeys, a basement and an attic. Its Hope Street front has seven bays. The central bay projects forward and is surmounted by a domical roof with a clock face and an iron railing on its crest. The ground floor contains a rusticated round-headed entrance flanked by paired columns supporting an entablature and a pierced balcony. In the first floor is a three-light window with a tympanum, and rusticated quoins. In the attic floor are three round-headed windows, flat pilasters and a segmental pediment. The second and sixth bays consist of two-storeyed canted bays containing sash windows with architraves. In the attics are two round-headed windows. The other bays have three-light windows with pilasters and tympani containing carvings of foliage and busts in the ground floor. The windows in the first floor of these bays are surrounded by pilasters, entablatures and pediments. On the right side of the building is the entrance to the original house. It has four bays and includes a portico with four Ionic columns. On 14 March 1975 the house was designated it as a Grade II listed building.
