= Exchange Equalisation Account =

The Exchange Equalisation Account (EEA) is a fund of His Majesty's Treasury in the United Kingdom. It holds the country's special drawing rights (SDR) held at the International Monetary Fund as well as reserves of foreign currencies and gold. It was set up to provide funding which if necessary can be used to manage the exchange value of pound sterling on international markets.

The EEA was established by Neville Chamberlain's budget of 19 April 1932 following the pound's exit from the gold exchange standard the previous September.

The Exchange Stabilization Fund is a similar fund operated by the US Treasury since 1934. It was created as a response to the EEA.

== See also ==
- Gold reserves of the United Kingdom
