= Gold reserves of the United Kingdom =

The gold reserve of the United Kingdom is the amount of gold kept by the Bank of England as a store of value of part of the United Kingdom's wealth. Left over from the Gold Standard which the country abandoned in 1931, it is the 17th largest central bank gold reserve in the world with 310.29 tonnes of gold bars.

== History ==
=== World War II ===
Prior to Britain's declaration of war in September 1939 vast amounts of gold were being shipped across the Atlantic to the United States via Montreal, Quebec, Canada to pay for weapons. After France was invaded by Nazi Germany, fear of Britain also suffering the same fate led to most of the country's gold being relocated under a secret operation known as Operation Fish. In May 1940, under the order of the UK Government; 280 tonnes of the nation's gold was transported from the Bank of England in London to Martins Bank in Liverpool ready to be shipped to Canada.

By the end of the war in 1945, Britain was estimated to have reserves in excess of 1772.94 tonnes, however, with incomplete records; the figure may have been higher.

=== Brown's Bottom ===
In May 1999, then-Chancellor of the Exchequer Gordon Brown announced plans to sell off 415 tonnes of gold in order to diversify the country's reserves owing to the volatile value of gold. The first series of sales amounting to 125 tonnes took place in the year 2000 across five auctions with each selling 25 tonnes. By the end of 2002, UK gold reserves dropped to 355.25 tonnes while at the same time the value of gold increased dramatically leading to an estimated loss of £2,000,000,000 from the gold sold.

== Gold reserves ==
Reserves from 1950 to 2015

UK gold reserves by year
Year	Tonnes	+/- Change	Year	Tonnes	+/- Change
Jan 2017	310.29	Steady	1972	656	▼
2016	310.29	Steady	1971	690	▼
2015	310.29	▲	1970	1198	▼
2014	310.25	Steady	1969	1308	▼
2013	310.25	Steady	1968	1309	▲
2012	310.25	Steady	1967	1146	▼
2011	310.25	Steady	1966	1725	▼
2010	310.25	Steady	1965	2012	▼
2009	310.25	▼	1964	1899	▼
2008	310.26	▲	1963	2208	▼
2007	310.25	▲	1962	2294	▲
2006	310.8	▼	1961	2014	▼
2005	312.25	▼	1960	2489	▲
2004	313.22	▼	1959	2234	▼
2003	313.87	▼	1958	2495	▲
2002	355.25	▼	1957	1382	▼
2001	487.5	▼	1956	1576	▼
2000	588.27	▼	1955	1788	▼
1999	715	Steady	1954	2255	▲
1998	715	▲	1953	2011	▲
1997	573	Steady	1952	1317	▼
1996	573	Steady	1951	1930	▼
1995	573	▼	1950	2543	▲
1994	574	Steady	1945	1772.94	▲
1993	574	▼	1940	1390.22	▼
1992	579	▼	1935	1464.56	▲
1991	588	▼	1930	1080	▲
1990	589	▼	1925	1045.53	▲
1989	591	Steady	1920	863.75	▲
1988	591	Steady	1915	584.6	▲
1987	591	Steady	1913	248.09	▲
1986	591	▼	1910	223.37	▲
1985	592	Steady	1905	199.21	▼
1984	592	▲	1900	198.47	▼
1983	591	Steady	1895	304.67	▲
1982	591	▼	1890	166.25	▲
1981	592	▲	1885	141.35	▼
1980	586	▼	1880	170.6	▲
1979	568	▼	1875	153.8	▼
1978	710	▲	1870	161.11	▲
1977	691	▲	1865	93	▲
1976	654	Steady	1860	77.63	▲
1975	654	Steady	1855	74	▼
1974	654	▲	1850	104.72	▲
1973	653	▼	1845	82	Steady

== See also ==
- Whole of Government Accounts
- Exchange Equalisation Account
