= Arnold Thornely =

Sir Arnold Thornely
- Born: 7 October 1870; Godley, Cheshire, England
- Died: 1 October 1953 (aged 82); Cobham, Surrey, England
- Occupation: Architect
- Known for: Parliament Buildings, Belfast (1928-32); Mersey Docks and Harbour Board Building (1903–07)

Sir Arnold Thornely (7 October 1870 – 1 October 1953) was an English architect who practised in Liverpool. Although most of his designs were for buildings in Liverpool and the northwest of England, he is best known for the Parliament Buildings in Belfast, Northern Ireland (commonly known as Stormont). Thornely was knighted in 1932, and in the following year received the Bronze Medal of the Royal Institute of British Architects for Ulster.

== Biography ==
Arnold Thornely was the son of a cotton mill manager, born in 1870 in Godley, which was at that time in Cheshire. He was educated at a grammar school in Derbyshire, and then at the Liverpool School of Art. After being articled to Francis Usher Holmes and George Holme, he became an assistant in the Liverpool firm of Willinck and Thicknesse. In 1898 he established his own practice in Liverpool. He married Caroline Thornely in 1902 in St Paul's Church, Helsby, and with her had two children. In 1906 Thornely joined in partnership with Frank Gatley Briggs and Henry Vernon Wolstenholme, and was later joined by F. B. Hobbs. Latterly he worked with his brother Herbert Lionel Thornely, and they had an office in the Royal Liver Building in Liverpool. He was elected a Fellow of the Royal Institute of British Architects in 1907, and was President of the Liverpool Architectural Society in 1910–11. In 1932 Thornley was knighted, and in the following year was awarded the Bronze Medal of the Royal Institute of British Architects for Ulster. In his later years he lived in Cobham, Surrey, where he died in 1953. His estate amounted to over £89,000 (equivalent to £2,160,000 as of 2025).

== Works ==
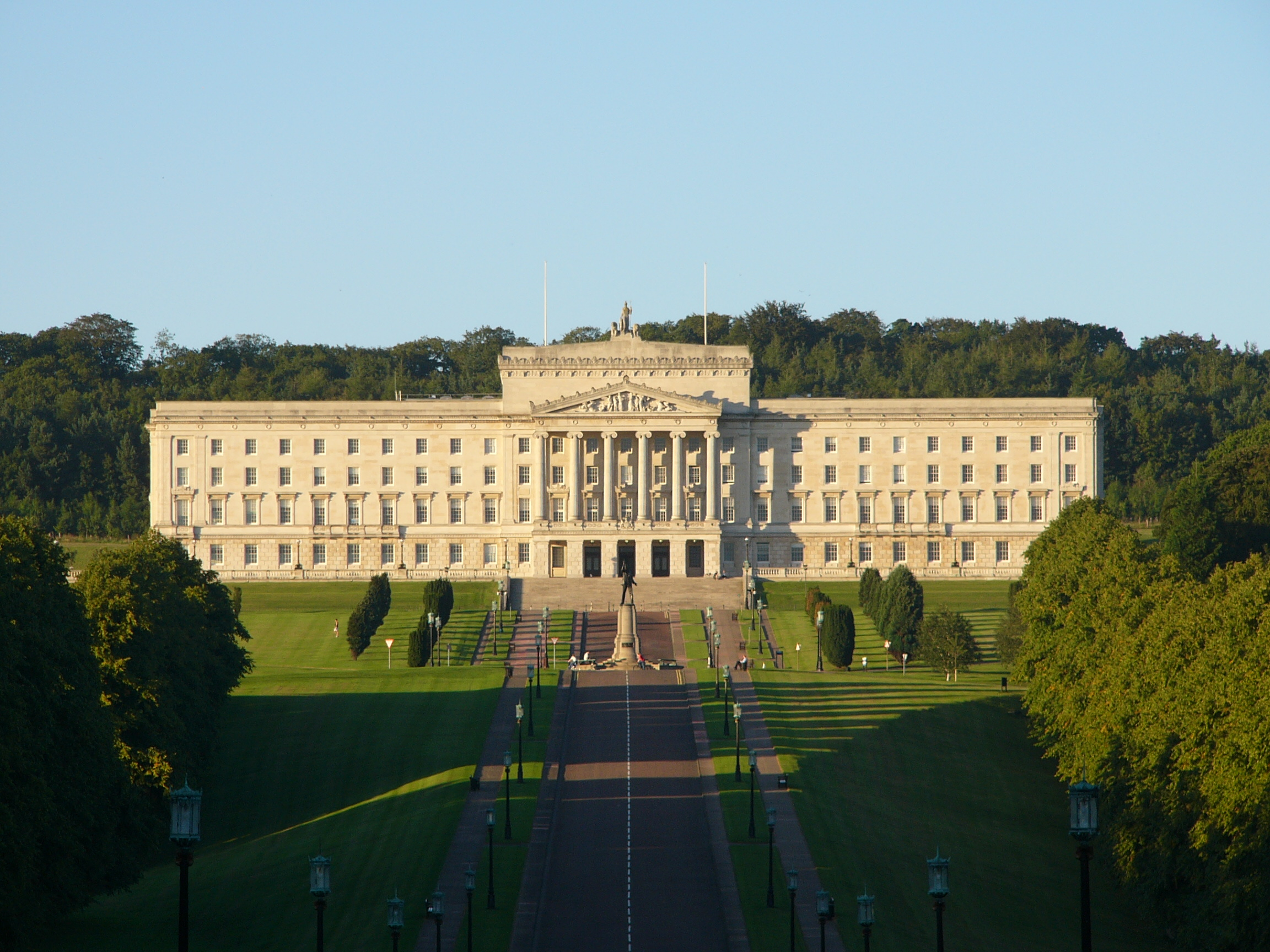
Parliament Buildings, Stormont, Belfast

Although most of his designs were for buildings in and around Liverpool, Thornely is best known for his design of the Parliament Buildings in Belfast, Northern Ireland (commonly known as Stormont), which were built between 1928 and 1932. With Hobbs he designed the Mersey Docks and Harbour Board Building (1903–07), and with Briggs and Wolstenholme a building for the Bank of British West Africa (completed in 1920). In 1923, with Herbert J. Rowse, he won a competition for the design of India Buildings in Liverpool. With Briggs and Wolstenholme, he also designed laboratories for the Geology Department of the University of Liverpool (1927–29), and an extension to the Walker Art Gallery (1931–33). Away from the centre of Liverpool, Thornely designed new premises for Liverpool Blue Coat School (1906), King Edward VII School, Lytham St Annes (1908), and town halls at Wallasey (1914–19), Preston, and Barnsley.
