= Philharmonic Hall, Liverpool =

Concert hall in Liverpool, England

Coordinates: 53.4012°N 2.9701°W

Liverpool Philharmonic Hall
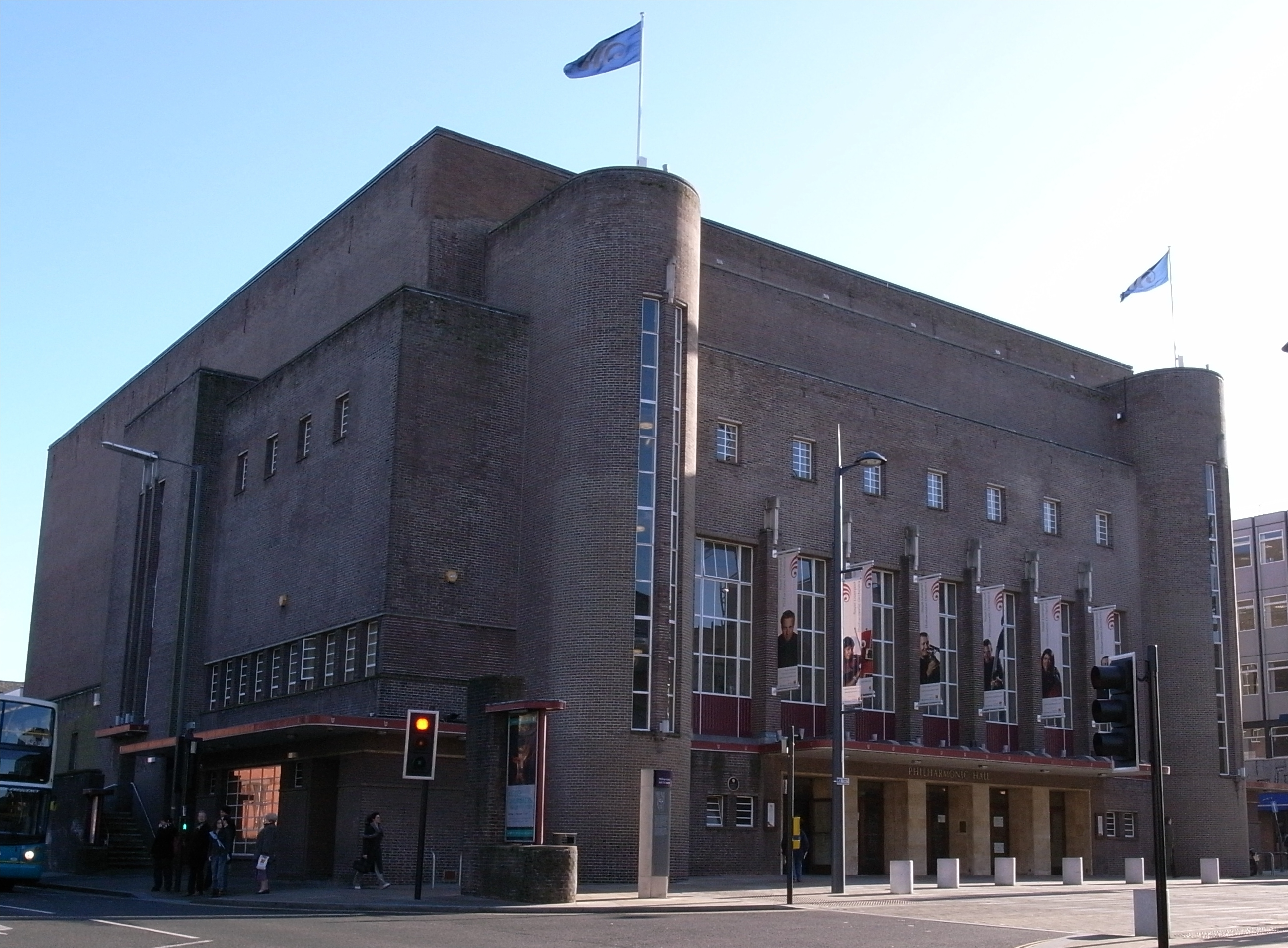
- Exterior view of venue, c. 2008
- Interactive map of Liverpool Philharmonic Hall
- Address: Hope St, Liverpool L1 9BP, England
- Location: Knowledge Quarter
- Owner: Royal Liverpool Philharmonic Society
- Capacity: 1,700

Construction
- Groundbreaking: June 1937
- Opened: 19 June 1939
- Renovated: 1995; 2015
- Cost: £120,000 (£7.07 million in 2025 sterling)
- Architect: Herbert Rowse

Website
- Official website
- OS grid reference: SJ 356 898

Site notes
- Architectural style: Streamline Moderne

Listed Building – Grade II*
- Official name: Philharmonic Hall (including detached poster piers to south west and north west)
- Designated: 19 March 1981
- Reference no.: 1279652

Liverpool Philharmonic Hall is a concert hall on Hope Street in Liverpool, England. It is the home of the Royal Liverpool Philharmonic Society and is recorded in the National Heritage List for England as a designated Grade II* listed building. It is not the original concert hall on the present site; its predecessor was destroyed by fire in 1933 and the present hall was opened in 1939.

== Original hall ==
The first hall in 1849

The Liverpool Philharmonic Society was founded in 1840 but initially did not have a permanent concert hall. In 1844 the Liverpool architect John Cunningham was appointed to prepare plans for a hall. The initial requirement was for a "concert room" holding an audience of 1,500 which would cost at least £4,000 (equivalent to £439,000 in 2025). Later that year the requirement was increased to a "new concert hall" to accommodate an audience of 2,100 and an orchestra of 250, plus "refreshment and retiring rooms". Subscribers were invited to both buy shares and to purchase seats along the sides of the hall. The foundation stone was laid in 1846 and plans were made for Mendelssohn to write a cantata to be played in his presence at the opening of the hall. Mendelssohn did not live long enough to write the work.

The hall cost £30,000 (equivalent to £3.3 million in 2025) and was opened on 27 August 1849 accompanied by a week long festival. A correspondent for The Times reported that it was "one of the finest and best adapted to music that I ever entered". The correspondent described the interior:

The orchestra, on each side of which is a canopied box for the use of the committee or the directors of the concert, is at the east end of the hall, recessed under an arch, filled to the extremities by the instrumental and choral phalanx of executants, disposed semicircularly, with numberless bronze music-stands, each surmounted by a lyre. It has a most imposing appearance. A large organ, of simple but classic design, backs the orchestra. The length of the body of the hall, without the orchestra, is about 104 feet; with the orchestra, about 150 feet. The breadth cannot fall short of 100 feet. The form of the room is oblong. The boxes, 65 in number, are disposed on each side of the hall, under the galleries, which in their turn are surmounted by the brilliant line of gas-burners .... The entire body of the hall is divided into comfortable stalls which leave plenty of room to sit at ease, and have all the accommodation of arm chairs. Three doors for ingress and egress are disposed at each side of the hall, and there are divided by windows, fitted with perforated zinc for the purpose of ventilation. Two immense elliptic arches on each side of the hall, spanning nearly the entire length of the body, inclose the boxes and galleries, and give them the appearance of being recessed. The galleries are sustained by gilded pillars, which front the boxes, with scroll ornaments for capitals. At the west end of the building, opposite the orchestra, there are two galleries, one above the other. The roof is covered, and the covers are of stucco, perforated; the centre is flat, but elaborately ornamented and relieved. The boxes are very elegantly fitted … The hall is lighted in day-time by four large windows, two on either side.

According to The New Grove Dictionary of Music and Musicians, the hall was universally agreed to have superb acoustics. A new organ was installed in the hall in 1930 at a cost of £2,000 (equivalent to £113,000 in 2025).

Interior of the first hall in 1849

The concert hall continued to be the home of the society until a fire broke out during the evening of 5 July 1933. Despite over 100 firemen attending the fire, the hall and new organ were damaged beyond repair. Over 10,000 people stood in the streets around the hall to view the fire. There were no serious injuries – the hall had closed for the day – though two boys fell into the basement while watching the fire and a number of onlookers fainted or collapsed. The next day the chairman of the Philharmonic Society announced that the hall would certainly be rebuilt, saying that until then they would need to find a replacement hall in which to play. The hall contained a number of autograph books dating from 1848; these were contained in a fire-proof safe and thus kept safe along with autographed pictures and some instruments, though the music library was lost. The building was insured, and the insurers paid £84,000 (equivalent to £5.2 million in 2025) for the hall itself, £9,503 (equivalent to £588,000 in 2025) for other assets, and £6,000 (equivalent to £371,000 in 2025) for the loss of two years' rental. The exact cause of the fire was not known; only that it originated in the roof of the building. Demolition work on the building's ruins began the next day.

== Present hall ==
=== History ===
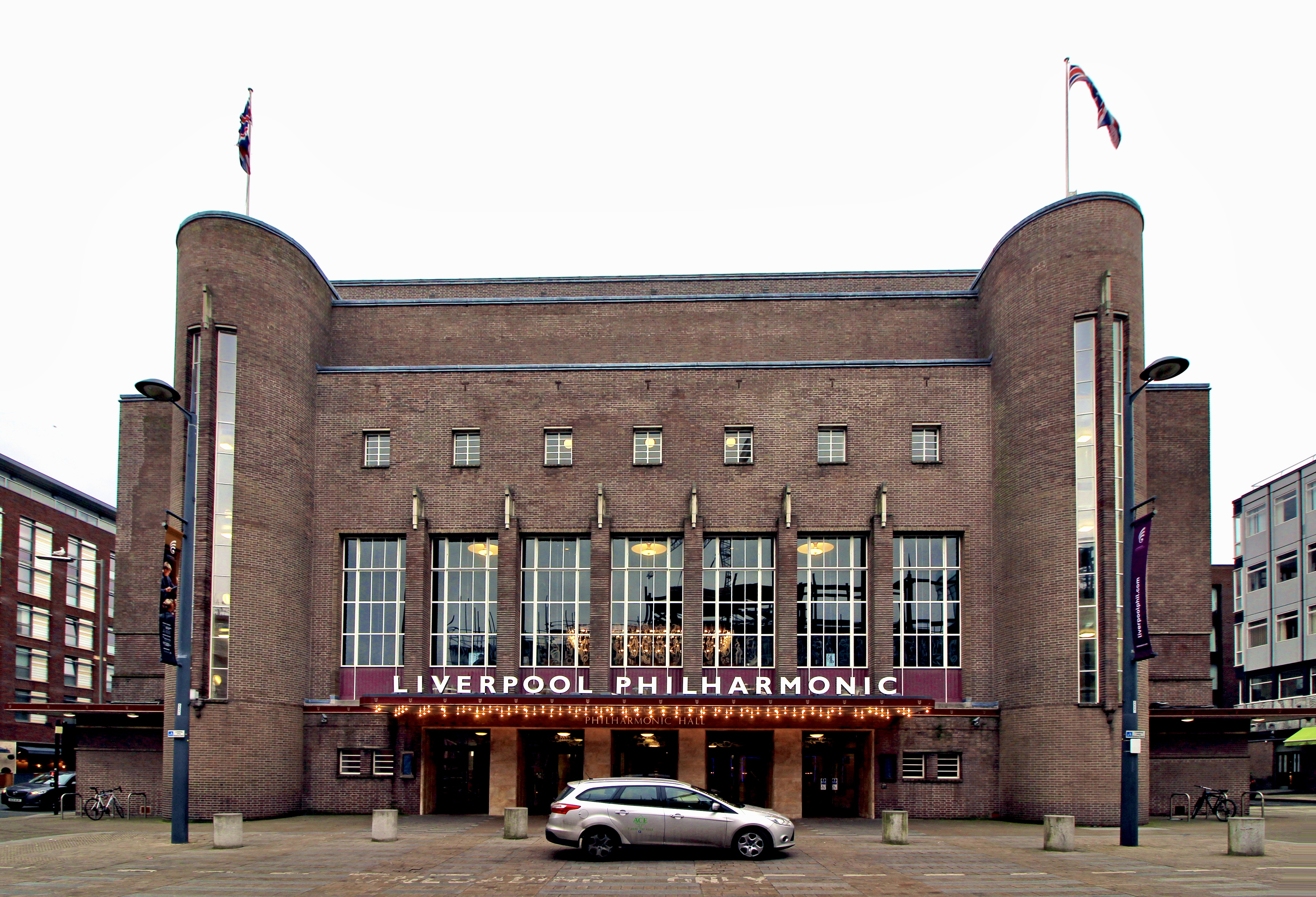
The building's facade after the 2014 renovation, 2018

The building of a new hall was delayed by the demands of Liverpool Corporation, which announced that it would not support the building of a venue suitable only as a concert hall. The corporation demanded an auditorium equally suited to cinema and theatre use. Controversy ensued with vocal opposition to the corporation's stance led by the doyen of British conductors, Sir Henry Wood. A compromise was reached and work began in June 1937.

Herbert J. Rowse was commissioned to design a new hall on the site of the previous hall. Rowse's design was in Streamline Moderne style. It incorporated an organ built by the Liverpool firm of Rushworth and Dreaper with a console which can be lowered from the stage. The hall was officially opened on 19 June 1939, and inaugurated the next day with a concert conducted by Sir Thomas Beecham. The Manchester Guardian commented, "The magnificent compliment Liverpool has paid to the cause of music in England almost takes one's breath away ... a hall of great size, noble proportions, and up-to-date appointments ... ready to take its place among the most eminent homes of musical culture in this or any other country". The final cost of the hall was a little over £120,000 (equivalent to £6.78 million in 2025) and the architect was paid £6,869 (equivalent to £388,000 in 2025). An extension was added to the rear of the hall which was completed in 1992, designed by Brock Carmichael Associates. A major refurbishment of the hall was carried out in 1995 at a cost of £10.3 million. This included the complete replacement of the fibrous plaster interior with concrete, carried out again by Brock Carmichael, working with the acoustic consultant firm Lawrence Kirkegaard Associates. A local violinist, John Frederick Clarke, who was part of the famed RMS Titanic orchestra, and the other band members who died during the ship's sinking in 1912 are all commemorated on a memorial plaque within Philharmonic Hall.

A further renovation, costing around £14 million, was completed in October 2015, primarily refurbishing the main concert hall and auditorium. The 2015 renovation also saw the introduction of a new performance space named the Music Room, which replaced the former Rodewald Suite as Liverpool Philharmonic's secondary venue, with an increased capacity of between 180 and 250 people. The Music Room was formally opened to the public in a free open house event on 9 October 2015.

=== Architecture ===
The hall is built with fawn-coloured facing bricks, and is mainly in three storeys. It has a symmetrical frontage with a canopied entrance flanked by semicircular stair turrets. Above the entrance are seven windows that are separated by piers surmounted by carved abstract motifs. Outside the hall and separated from it are two piers for the display of posters. The architectural historians Pollard and Pevsner and the author of the description in the National Heritage List for England agree that the design of the hall was influenced by the Dutch architect W. M. Dudok.

The windows above the canopy contain glass etched by Hector Whistler. Glass doors panels by Whistler, originally from the building, and depicting musical instruments in art deco style, were featured on the BBC One's Antiques Roadshow in March 2015. Thirteen Pilkington glass panels had been purchased from a market in France by a Liverpool dealer, who expressed an interest in donating some to local museums. Inside the entrance to the hall is a copper memorial to the musicians of the Titanic by J. A. Hodel, and on the landings are gilded reliefs of Apollo by Edmund C. Thompson. The interior of the auditorium is "sensuously curved". On the walls on each side are incised female figures in art deco style that represent "musical moods", also by Thompson. On the back wall above the platform was a kinetic structure, called Adagio, designed by Marianne Forrest in 1995; however this was moved to the nearby Harold Cohen Library at the University of Liverpool in 2016.

The hall contains a 3-manual pipe organ built by Rushworth and Dreaper, with a console on a lifting platform to store the console beneath the stage when not in use, and a Walturdaw rising cinema screen which is often played up with a musical interlude by the Hall's resident organist Dave Nicholas.

== Current use ==
The hall stages over 250 events each year, of which more than 60 are concerts of classical music. The main hall has a capacity of 1,700 with smaller events taking place in the Music Room, Green Room and 1840 Room. The other shows include music of all genres (including international artists such as Sir Cliff Richard, Bryan Ferry, Brian Wilson, Kraftwerk and Gilbert O'Sullivan), comedians, and films shown on the Walturdaw screen. Tours of the hall are arranged, and the hall can he hired for corporate or private events, including weddings.

== See also ==
- Grade II* listed buildings in Liverpool – City Centre
- Architecture of Liverpool
- Philharmonic Dining Rooms "The Phil" public house
