= Operation Fish =

WWII evacuation of British wealth to Canada

Coordinates: 45°30′0.75″N 73°34′12.81″W

- Part of Second World War
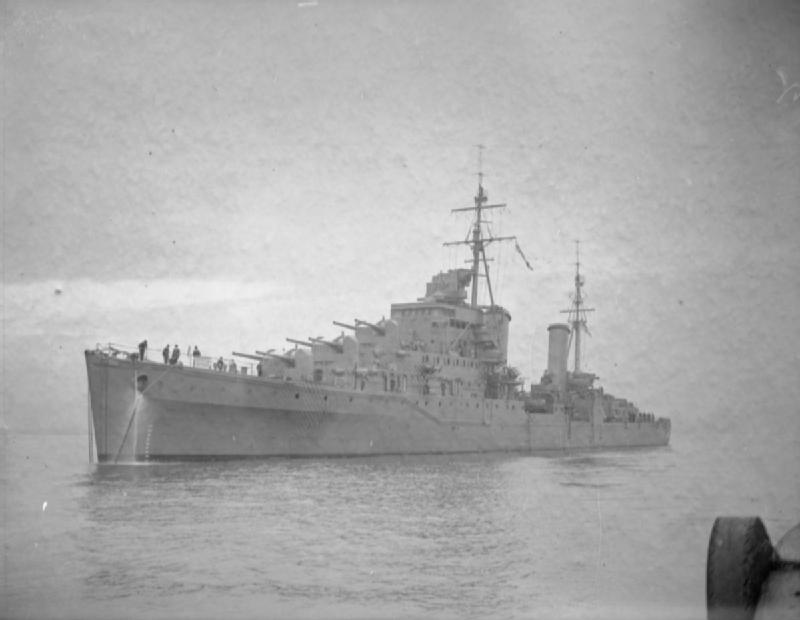
- HMS Bonaventure was forced to remain stationary for a time to protect a treasure ship
Location	Between UK and Canadian Ports
Result	Successfully completed

Belligerents
United Kingdom; Canada	Germany

Casualties and losses
0 ships sunk	

Operation Fish was the relocation of British money and gold ingots from the United Kingdom to Canada for safekeeping during the Second World War. It was the largest known movement of physical wealth in history.

== Naming ==
The operation was named after fish as the cargo (gold) that was supplied to the Canadians for safekeeping was labelled as 'fish', intended to disguise the transfer of wealth.

== Background ==
In September 1939, the British government decreed that all people living in the UK had to declare their securities with the Treasury. Even before Operation Fish, convoys had been sent with gold and money worth millions of pounds to purchase weapons from the United States. One such run involved Commodore Augustus Agar and his ship, the light cruiser HMS Emerald. At 23:18 on 3 October 1939, Emerald dropped anchor in Plymouth, England. A short time later, Agar was briefed by Rear Admiral Lancelot Holland on his mission. The written instructions are below.

Two million pounds in gold bars [GBP97,000,000 in 2025] is to be embarked in each ship to Halifax. A railway truck is expected to be placed alongside each ship about 01.00 October 7. Each truck is expected to contain 148 boxes each weighing 130 lbs. The total number of boxes is numbered Z 298 to Z 741 inclusive. Guards are to be put on each truck on arrival at the ship. Embarkation is to commence about 06.30 or as soon as daylight permits. Adequate steps are to be taken for supervision of each box from unloading from truck to stowage in ship. Finally a receipt is to be forwarded to C in C Western Approaches on the attached form.

On 7 October 1939, Emerald sailed from Plymouth for Halifax, Nova Scotia, with the gold bullion from the Bank of England, bound for Montreal, Quebec, Canada, to be used to pay for American war materials. As this voyage was under the strictest secrecy, the crew were outfitted with "tropical white" uniforms, to confuse German agents. In the company of the two old battleships HMS Revenge and HMS Resolution and her sister ship HMS Enterprise, as well as the old cruiser HMS Caradoc, the Emerald ran into some of the heaviest seas that Agar encountered. By the time the convoy reached Halifax, the Emerald had lost her ship's boats, rafts, and various depth charges, wires, shackles, and other valuable equipment, as well as her spotter plane, a Fairey Seafox.

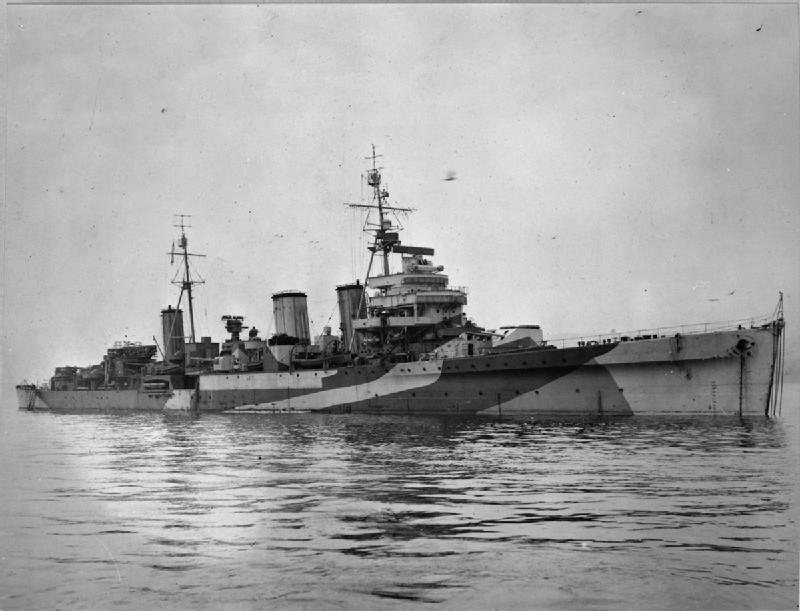
HMS Enterprise, one of the treasure ships

Winston Churchill formed his government as a guarantee that the Empire could continue the fight if the UK was overrun. With the Empire, he devised a plan to ship British wealth to the safety of Canada. Using their wartime powers, the Churchill government confiscated the securities that the British people were forced to register at the beginning of the year, and under the cover of secrecy, moved them to the port of Greenock in Scotland. Then, men sworn to secrecy loaded the wealth onto HMS Emerald. The ship departed on 24 June 1940 and with an escort of some destroyers sailed to Canada. Again another fierce storm endangered the operation when high seas forced the ships to slow their speed, making them easy targets for any prowling U-boats. When they finally reached Halifax, on 1 July 1940, the British treasure was transferred to trains and the gold sent to Ottawa, while the securities were shipped to the Sun Life Building in Montreal.

Another Operation Fish convoy sailed from Greenock (Scotland) on 5 July 1940, comprising five ships loaded with $1.7 billion (US$39.07 billion in 2025), which was the largest movement of wealth in history. Offshore, they met their escort, which included the battleship HMS Revenge, a cruiser and several destroyers. Trouble arose when one of the convoy ships, a Polish ship, the Batory, loaded with treasure, had engine trouble and had to drop out of the convoy, escorted by only HMS Bonaventure; the two ships then encountered heavy fog and, because of the dangers of icebergs, came to a halt, making them easy targets for any U-boats that might find them; eventually, repairs were made and both ships were able to make it to Halifax days after the other treasure ships had landed.

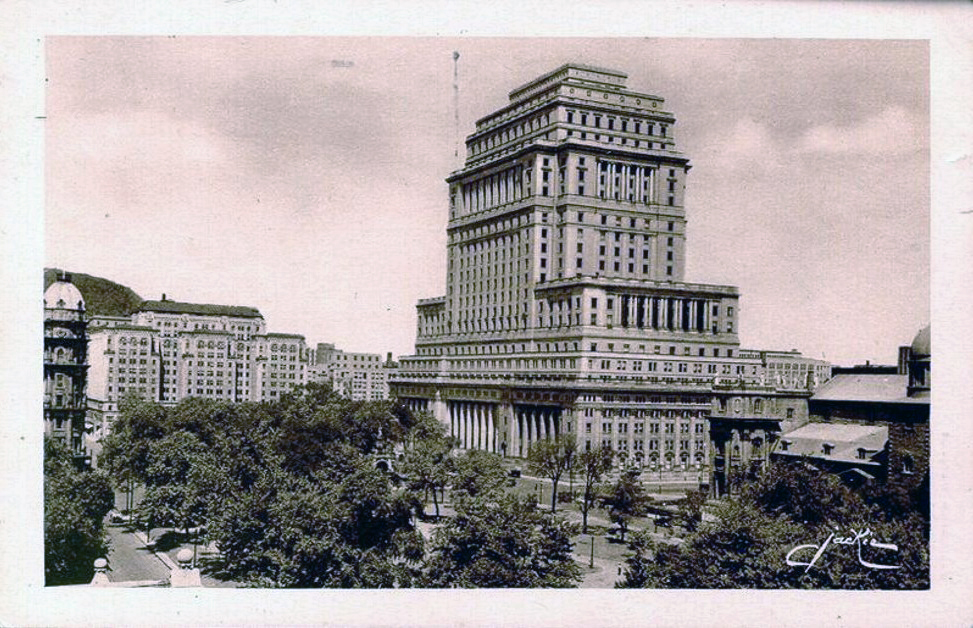
The Sun Life Building in Montreal in 1942

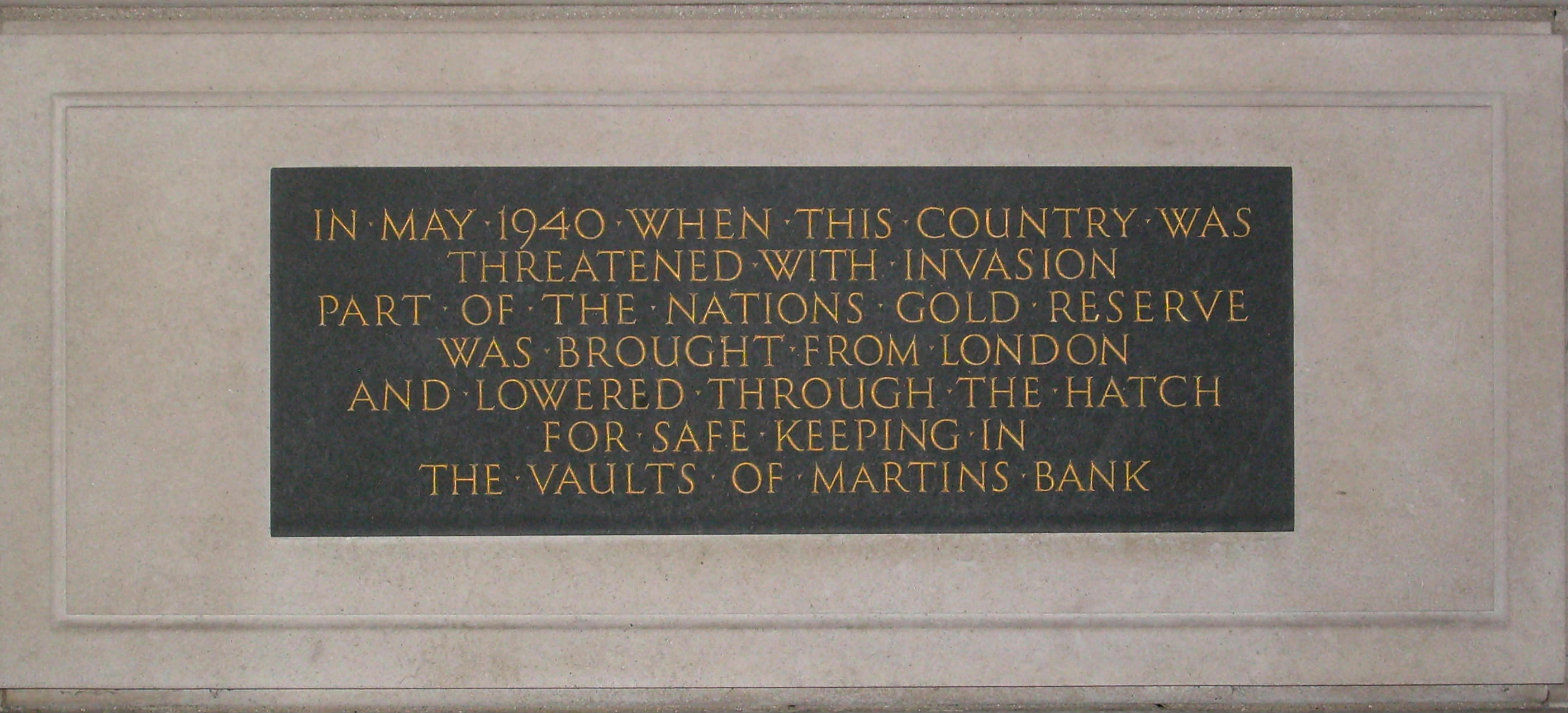
Commemorative plaque at the Martins Bank Building in Liverpool

=== Storage ===
The British securities were locked in a specially constructed underground vault that was rushed into existence three storeys beneath the Sun Life Building in Montreal, and were guarded around the clock by the Royal Canadian Mounted Police. A persistent rumour that the Crown Jewels of the United Kingdom were stored there was deliberately spread in Montreal to account for increased activity at the building. The extremely secretive United Kingdom Security Deposit, operating in the vault, arranged for the sale of Britain's negotiable securities on the New York Stock Exchange over the next few years to pay for Britain's war expenses. The 5,000 employees of Sun Life never suspected what was stored in their basement, and while unloading the treasure ships, not one crate of the cargo went missing. Even though thousands of people were involved, Axis intelligence agencies never found out about the operation. Hundreds of government accountants and bankers worked tirelessly to catalogue the contents of thousands of crates taken off the ships. When they were finished it was determined that $2.5 billion (US$57.45 billion in 2025) had been shipped from the UK to Canada without one gold bar being lost.

== Commemoration ==
A stone plaque on the outer wall of the Martins Bank Building on Water Street in Liverpool commemorates the gold stored there en route to Canada: "In May 1940 when this country was threatened with invasion part of the nation's gold reserve was brought from London and lowered through the hatch for safe keeping in the vaults of Martins Bank."

== In fiction ==
The 1993 BBC drama The Bullion Boys depicts the 1940 transport of Bank of England gold to Canada via Liverpool, and a plot by a group of Liverpool dock workers to steal some of it.

Operation Fish features significantly in the 2022 crime novel The Twyford Code by Janice Hallett.

== See also ==
- Gold reserves of the United Kingdom
- Flight of the Norwegian National Treasury - the transfer of Norway's gold reserves to the United States via the United Kingdom, to avoid them falling into the hands of Nazi Germany.
- Moscow gold (Spain) – gold reserves sent by Republican Spain to the Soviet Union during the Spanish Civil War
- Romanian Treasure, gold reserves sent (alongside other valuables) by Romania to Russia for safekeeping during World War I, but never returned

== Bibliography ==
- Breuer, William B. (2008). Top Secret Tales of World War II (2008 ed.). Book Sales. ISBN 9780785819516. - Total pages: 244
- Draper, Alfred (1979). Operation Fish: The Fight to Save the Gold of Britain, France and Norway from the Nazis (1979 ed.). General. ISBN 9780773600683. - Total pages: 377
- Library and Archives Canada (2013). "Hiding British Gold". Library and Archives Canada.
