= Edmund Thompson =

English sculptor (1898–1961)

Edmund Charles Thompson MBE
- Born: 9 May 1898; Belfast, United Kingdom
- Died: 20 August 1961 (aged 63)
- Occupation: Sculptor
- Style: Art deco
- Parent: Edmund T. Thompson

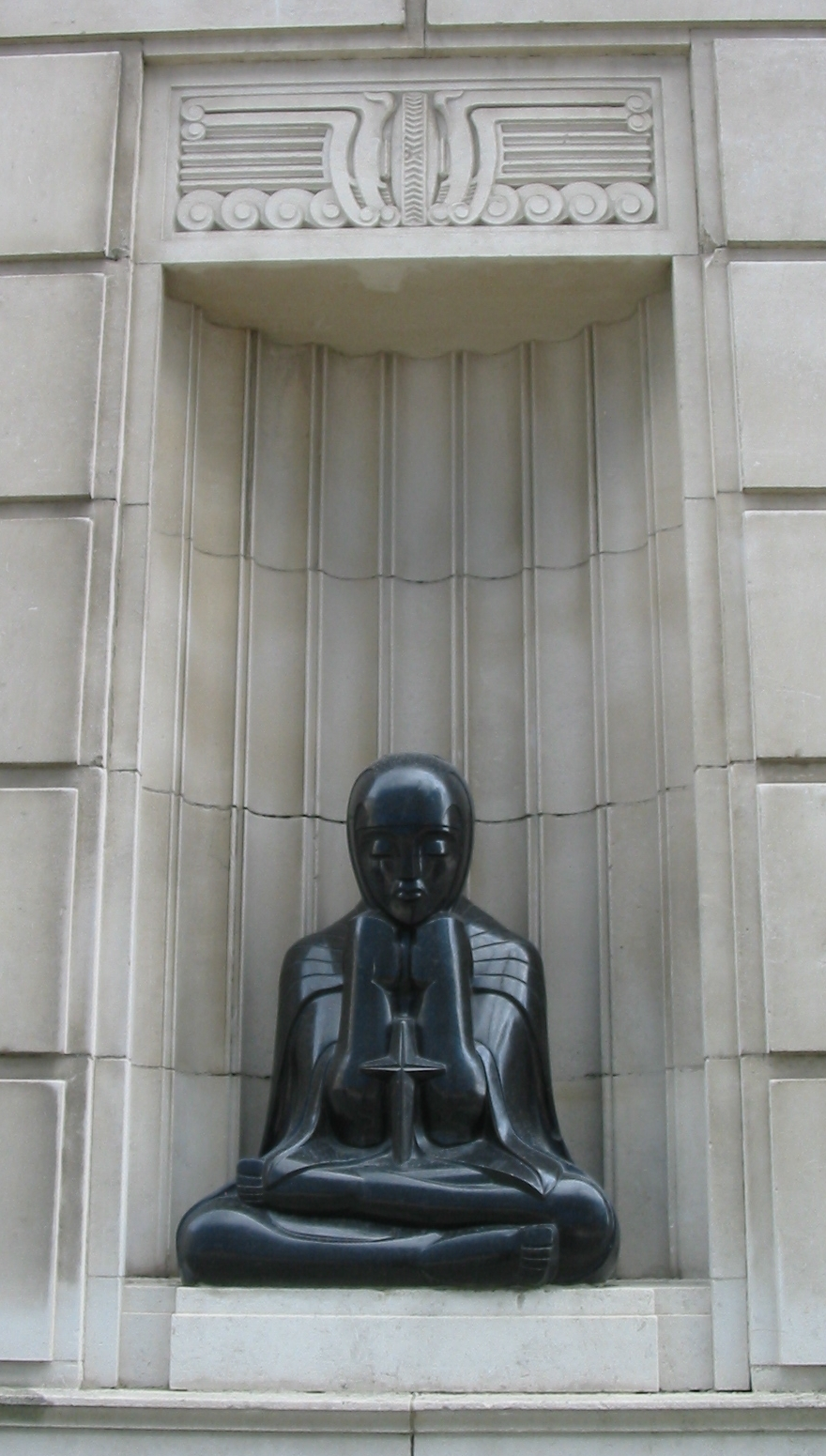
Night

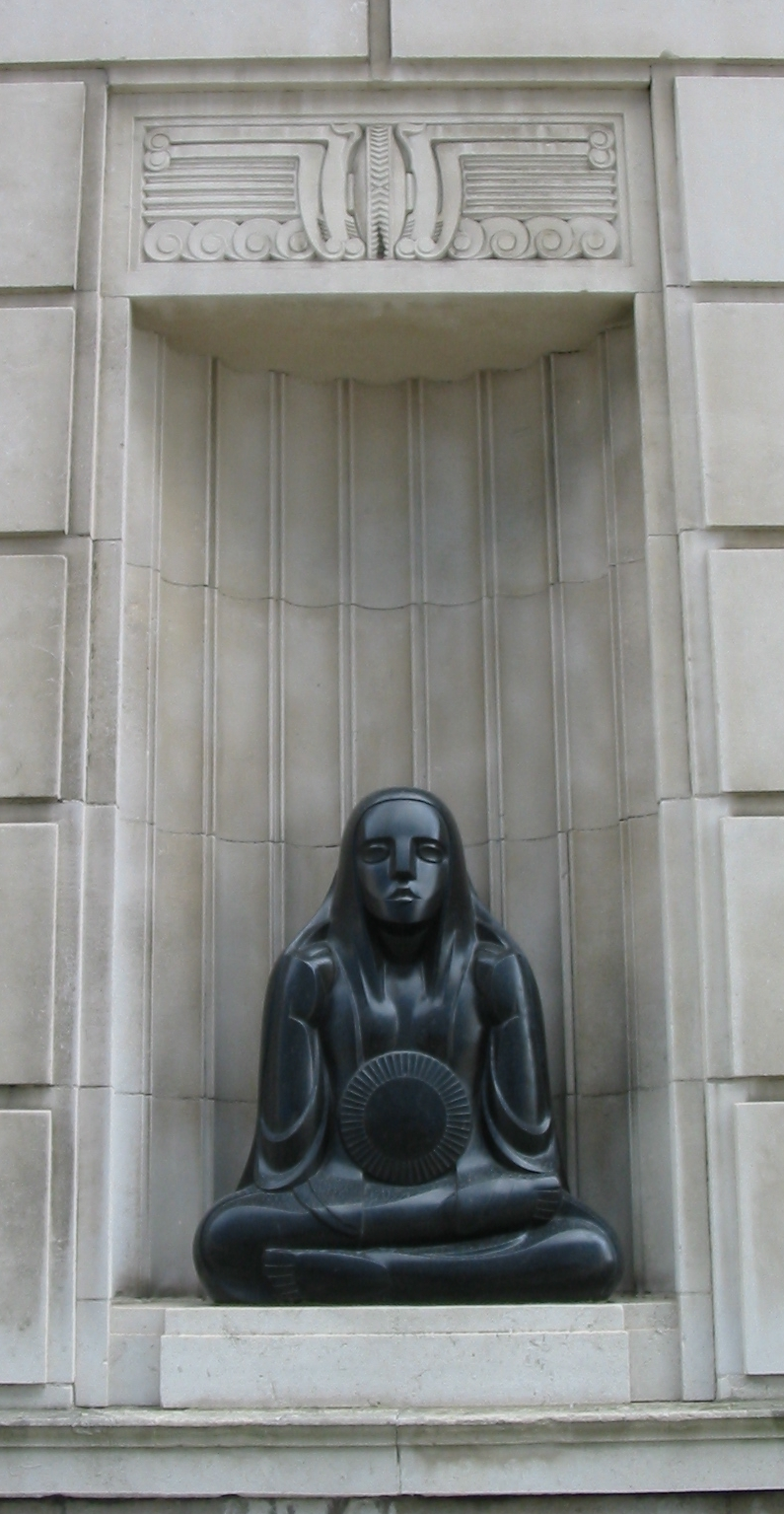
Day

Edmund Charles Thompson MBE (9 May 1898, Belfast – 20 August 1961) was an English sculptor, active in Liverpool between the First and Second World War. The son of sculptor Edmund T. Thompson, he worked in the art deco style and was an admirer of Eric Gill.

He worked closely with the architect Herbert James Rowse on many of the latter's buildings, and on civic projects. His work is featured in the Liverpool Philharmonic Hall (gilded reliefs of Apollo, on the landings) and at the main door of the George's Dock Building (basalt statues of 'Day' and 'Night'). He was sometimes assisted by George Capstick.

He was made MBE in 1959.

A selection of his works, in the possession of his family, were featured on the BBC's Antiques Roadshow programme on 21 October 2012, accompanied by his daughter.
