= India Buildings =

Listed building in Liverpool, England

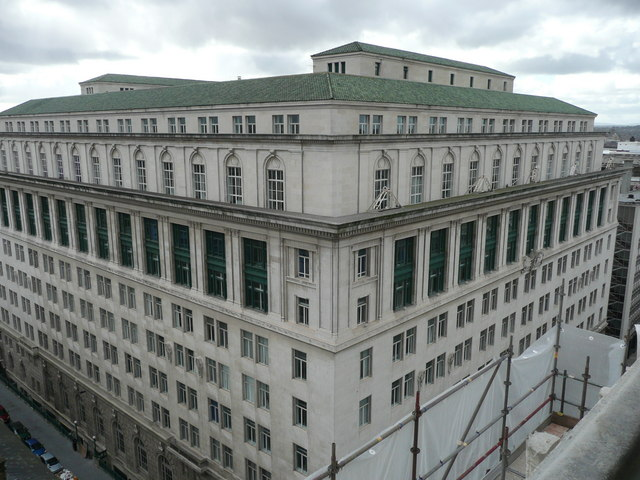
- India Buildings
- Interactive map of the India Buildings area

General information
- Architectural style: Italian Renaissance with American Beaux-Arts
- Location: Water Street, Liverpool, England
- Coordinates: 53°24′22″N 2°59′33″W
- Year built: 1924–32
- Client: Blue Funnel Line

Design and construction
- Architects: Arnold Thornely and Herbert J. Rowse
- Designations

Listed Building – Grade II*
- Official name: India Buildings, including the Water Street entrance to James Street underground station
- Designated: 5 November 2013
- Reference no.: 1280299

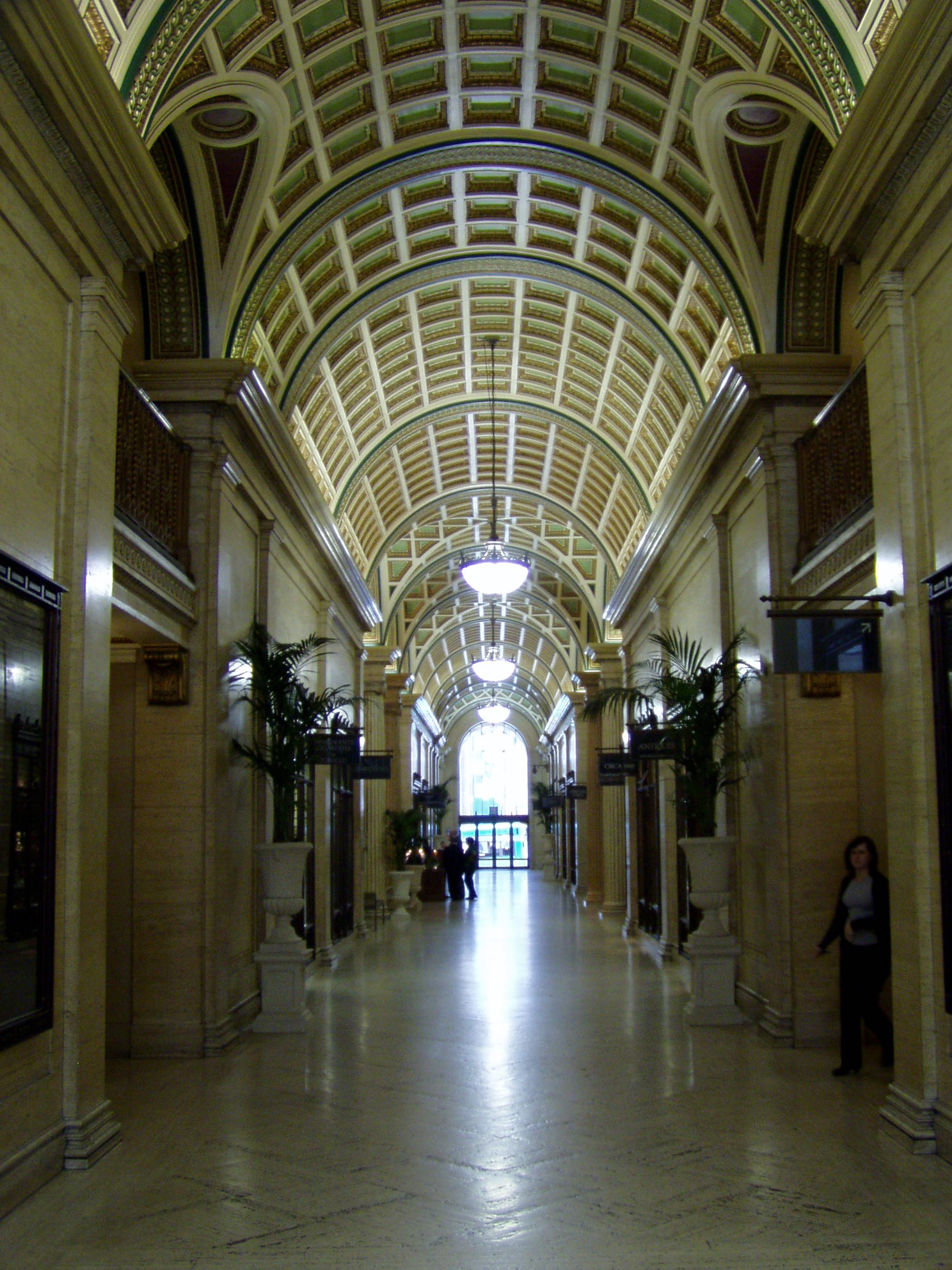
Internal shopping arcade

India Buildings is a commercial building with its principal entrance on Water Street in Liverpool, England. Mainly an office building, it also contains an internal shopping arcade and the entrance to an underground station. It was built between 1924 and 1932, damaged by a bomb in 1941, and later restored to its original condition under the supervision of one of its original architects. The building, its design influenced by the Italian Renaissance and incorporating features of the American Beaux-Arts style, occupies an entire block in the city.

== History ==
India Buildings was built between 1924 and 1932. The competition for its design was won in 1923 by Arnold Thornely and Herbert J. Rowse, the assessor being Giles Gilbert Scott. It was built as a speculative venture by the shipping firm of Richard Durning Holt and Alfred Holt and Company (the Blue Funnel Line) partly for its own use, and partly for letting offices to other businesses. It was built by Dove Brothers of Islington, its steelwork being made and erected by Dorman Long of Middlesbrough. The cost of the building was £1.25 million (equivalent to £109,600,000 in 2023). The building replaced an older one on the site known as "India Building", built in the 1830s for George Holt, the father of Alfred. The new building was constructed in two stages, the first stage being alongside the earlier building, and the second stage demolishing and replacing it. The two stages straddled the former Chorley Street. Before the design was approved, Liverpool Corporation stipulated that an arcade of shops should run through the centre of the building on the route of the street, and this was incorporated into the design. The original occupants included Lloyds Bank, a post office, commercial and insurance companies, solicitors, and government offices. Alfred Holt and Company occupied most of the sixth, seventh and eighth floors. Also in the building were a public hall and a constitutional club. India Buildings was badly damaged by bombing in 1941, and was later restored to its original condition under the supervision of Herbert J. Rowse.

The property became involved in one of the UK's largest fraud cases when it was used as collateral for large loans made by a company operated by Achilleas Kallakis and Alexander Williams. They had arranged for loans to be made in excess of the value of the buildings. This money was used to finance an expensive lifestyle including a helicopter and a plane.

India Buildings was sold to an Irish company called Green Property in 2009 who still owned it in January 2013 when the former owners, Kallakis and Williams, were jailed for fraud.

In August 2017, it was announced that British multinational financial services company, Legal & General had bought India Buildings. HMRC leased ten floors of the building to house a new regional centre. Around 3,500 HMRC staff were expected to start moving into the building when renovation work was completed in 2019. The plans were delayed when 400 tonnes of asbestos were discovered during the works. A new contractor was brought in to carry out the redevelopment work in September 2019, with the new tenants hoping to move in during 2020. The package of work being carried out included repairing and cleaning the façade, removing more than 50% of office ceilings, re-lining the cast iron drainage system, refurbishing ornate windows and replacing the existing eight lifts and the addition of five new lifts. On 6 December 2020, HMRC announced that they were to move in on 21 May 2021, starting from floors 3–6 with floors 1–2 opening in the summer. In March 2021, due to the continuing COVID-19 pandemic and the government advice on home working, the May 2021 opening of floors 3–6 was cancelled. A new move date was provisionally set for "summer 2021" which was to see staff from Regian House move in first as is tradition. St Johns House in Bootle was to continue to operate until 2022.

== Architecture ==
=== Exterior ===
The building occupies a whole block, and is surrounded by Water Street, Brunswick Street, Fenwick Street, and Drury Lane. It has nine storeys, a mezzanine, a basement and a sub-basement. The building is constructed on a steel frame and is clad in Portland stone. It is roofed in green Lombardic tiles. The main entrance is on Water Street, this front having 13 bays. The entrance itself consists of three tall arches that are flanked by four bronze lamps, made by the Bromsgrove Guild, their design being based on those at the Palazzo Strozzi in Florence. Over the entrance is an ornamental balcony. At the basement level are four decorative shop fronts, and to the right of these is an entrance to the James Street underground station. The Brunswick Street front is similar, except that its entrance has one arch rather than three. The Fenwick Street front and the Drury Lane front have 15 and 14 bays respectively.

=== Sculpture ===
All the sculpture on the exterior of the building is by Edmund C. Thompson. The keystones in the arches over the doorways and above some of the windows are carved with cherubs. Rather than all being identical, their designs are slightly varied. A frieze runs around the building just below the level of the top floor windows. On both the Water Street and the Brunswick Street fronts and incorporated in the frieze are crests, each of which is carved with a figure of Neptune kneeling in a scallop shell, and two reclining Tritons, reflecting the building's maritime connections.

=== Interior ===
A shopping arcade runs through the centre of the building, with offices on all floors. The entrances on Water Street and Brunswick Street lead into foyers. Each foyer has three painted and coffered saucer domes in the ceiling, supported by fluted Ionic columns in Travertine marble. There are doors to two lifts on each side. The shopping arcade has Travertine walls and floors, and a coffered barrel-vaulted ceiling with pendant lights. Along the sides of the arcade are shops with decorative bronze fronts. Elsewhere on the ground floor are larger areas originally occupied by the bank, the Post Office and the public hall. The upper floors contain offices, some of which have retained their original layout, while others have been altered. There is a war memorial dedicated to 15 members of staff from Alfred Holt Blue Funnel who died during World War 1. Public access to the arcade was closed as part of the deal to move in 3,500 HMRC staff, with HMRC citing security reasons for the proposed decision.

== Appraisal ==
India Buildings was designated as a Grade II listed building on 14 March 1975. Following a campaign by the Twentieth Century Society, its designation was raised to Grade II* on 5 November 2013. (Note: Grade II* status is given to buildings that "are particularly important buildings of more than special interest", and Grade II status to buildings that "are nationally important and of special interest".) One of the reasons given for this elevation in status is its transatlantic influence, reflecting Liverpool's historic links with the United States, stating that it "emulates the most impressive early 20th-century commercial buildings of the US", particularly those in New York. Other reasons include its architectural interest, including influences from the Italian Renaissance and the American Beaux-Arts movement, and the eminence of its architects. Also noted are its planning interest, in that it follows the United States grid system of town planning, the high quality of its internal finishes, its degree of survival with its major elements having been retained, and its group value with the nearby listed buildings.

== See also ==
- Architecture of Liverpool
- Grade II* listed buildings in Liverpool – City Centre

== Notes and references ==
Notes

Citations
