= Hector Whistler =

British painter, muralist and illustrator

- Born: Reginald Hector Whistler; 22 January 1905; Jersey, Channel Islands
- Died: 1978 (aged 72–73)

Reginald Hector Whistler (22 January 1905, in Jersey, Channel Islands – 1978) was a painter, muralist and illustrator. He was the cousin of artist Rex Whistler and glass engraver Laurence Whistler.

== Biography ==
He was born in Jersey in the family of Herbert Frederick Whistler and Blanche Hasler and educated at Victoria College there, then at the London School of Architecture, and Slade School of Art.

He illustrated When Poland Smiled, by Derek du Pré, in 1940, during World War II, with profits going to the Polish Relief Fund.

He moved to Jamaica in 1948.

His paintings are in the collections of All Souls College, Oxford and Jersey Museum and Art Gallery. Ascension of the Black Christ (1954) is in the First Baptist Church in Toronto, Canada.

Whistler is known for his etched glass panels for the Liverpool Philharmonic Hall. and for his illustrations for an edition of The Prime Minister by Anthony Trollope. Glass doors panels by Whistler, originally from Liverpool Philharmonic Hall, and depicting musical instruments in art deco style, were featured on the BBC One's Antiques Roadshow and were shown to Paul Atterbury in March 2015. Thirteen Pilkington glass panels had been purchased from a market in France by a Liverpool dealer, who expressed an interest in donating some to local museums.

== Books about him ==
Alissandra Cummin, Hector Whistler. Publisher: Barbados Museum and Historical Society (1988). ASIN B0007BW3L6

== Selected works ==
Sold in auctions

- The Forum Rome, 1957, watercolour.
- Mellons, Tengiers, 1957, oil on canvas.
- Market, Tangiers, 1957, biro watercolour.
- Grasse, France, 1957, biro watercolour
- A scene in the Caribbean, figures on a shore, watercolour.
- Rome, 1956, pencil and crayon
- Architectural Studies, 1956. Pencil sketches and colourwash
- View of a ruined temple in Rome, pencil and pastel drawing.

In museums collections

- Sir Hugh Springer (1950). All Souls College, University of Oxford
- Portrait of a Gentleman in Military Dress (1956). Jersey Museum and Art Gallery
