= Herbert James Rowse =

English architect (1887–1963)

- Born: 10 May 1887; Liverpool, England
- Died: 22 March 1963 (aged 75); Puddington Cheshire, England
- Occupation: architect
- Notable work: George's Dock Building, Philharmonic Hall, Liverpool, India Buildings

Herbert James Rowse (10 May 1887 – 22 March 1963) was an English architect. Born in Liverpool and a student of Charles Reilly at the Liverpool University School of Architecture, Rowse opened an architectural practice in the city. Although he designed major buildings for other cities, Rowse is best known for his work in Liverpool, including India Buildings, the entrances to and ventilation towers of the Mersey Tunnel ("Queensway"), and the Philharmonic Hall. He designed in a range of styles, from neoclassical to Art Deco, generally with a strong American influence.

== Life and career ==
Rowse was born at 15 Melling Road, Liverpool, the son of James William Rowse, a builder, and his wife, Sarah Ann, née Cammack. He was schooled privately, and from 1905 to 1908 he studied at the Liverpool University School of Architecture. The school, under Charles Reilly, was at that time beginning its rise to be the most influential architectural college in the country. Rowse was awarded first-class honours in 1907 and was joint winner of the Holt Travelling Scholarship in Architecture, which took him to Italy and the US. While working in the office of the architect Frank Simon he was admitted to associate membership of the Royal Institute of British Architects (RIBA) in 1910. Simon won an important Canadian commission in 1912, and Rowse worked in the firm's Winnipeg office in 1913. In June 1914 he returned to Liverpool, establishing his own practice.

During the First World War Rowse worked as an architect for the British navy. In July 1918 he married Dorothy (1893–1968), daughter of Thomas and Edith Parry of Crosby. They had two sons and a daughter, born between 1925 and 1933. After the war Rowse resumed his civilian practice with a commission for the Fairrie sugar refinery in Liverpool. In 1923 he entered an open competition for the design of India Buildings, a large development in the financial and administrative centre of Liverpool. The assessor was Giles Gilbert Scott; Rowse's design won, beating those by the architects of the Port of London Authority building, Tower Hill (Sir Edwin Cooper); the Royal Automobile Club, Pall Mall (Mewis and Davis); the Wolseley building, Piccadilly (Curtis Green); and the Cunard Building (Willing and Dodd) and Mersey Docks and Harbour Board building (Arnold Thornley), both at the Pier Head, Liverpool.

In Nikolaus Pevsner's series of books The Buildings of England he and Richard Pollard comment on "Rowse's two great commercial buildings":

The first was India Buildings of 1923–30, designed in conjunction with Arnold Thornely, and complete with a tunnel-vaulted shopping arcade; Reilly wrote that it "would not disgrace Fifth Avenue". Two years after completion, it was outdone by Rowse's Martins Bank opposite, whose arcaded and Travertine-clad banking hall is the match of any in the country, and one of the sights of Liverpool.

Rowse's contemporary, the architect H S Goodhart-Rendel, commented, "That an Englishman should have produced single-handed a specimen equal to America's best is undoubtedly gratifying, although the flawless magnificence of Martins Bank at Liverpool (1926) may evoke in us admiration untinged with affection."

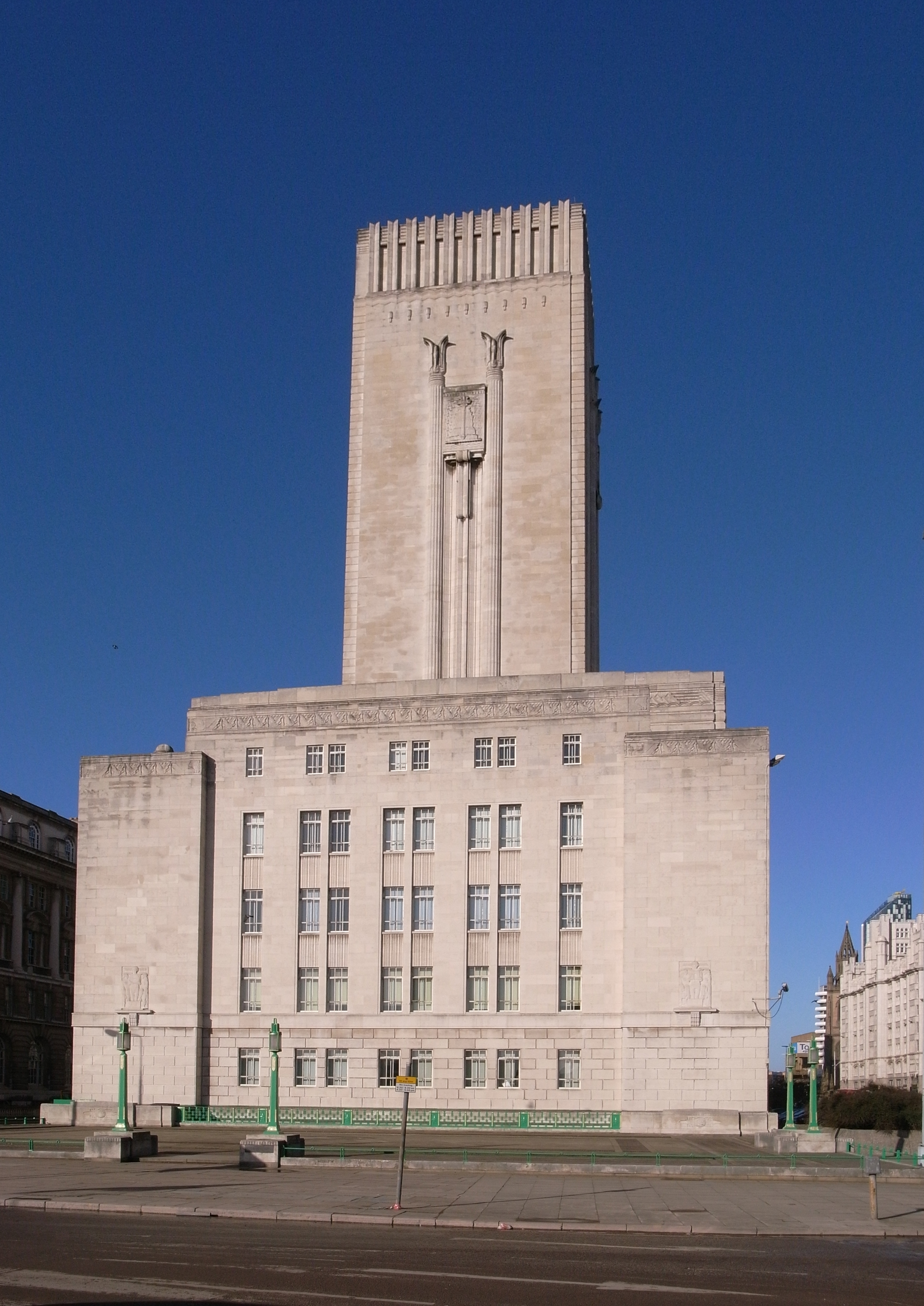
George's Dock Building, containing the ventilation tower, offices and control centre for Queensway Tunnel, Pier Head, Liverpool

In 1931 Rowse was appointed architect to the Mersey Tunnel Joint Committee. In a 1996 study of Reilly and his pupils, Joseph Sharples writes:

Reilly complained that an architect had not been involved in the project from the outset, and that Rowse's work had been compromised by decisions taken before his appointment. He particularly regretted … that Rowse had "been set the impossible task of decorating what is really but a hole in the ground. The engineer too often feels that he can cover up his mistakes by calling in an architect to add pretty things to hide them."

Rowse modified his style for his work on the tunnel, moving away from the American neo-classicism of India Buildings and the bank premises to "a smooth streamlined style with Art Deco ornaments, also American in inspiration." In 1934 the Bauhaus architect Walter Gropius came to see Rowse's work on the tunnel, and praised it. For the ventilation tower at Woodside, on the Cheshire side of the Mersey, Rowse received the Bronze Medal of the RIBA in 1937.

In 1932 a young architect, Alwyn Edward Rice, still a pupil of Reilly, designed a speculative modern concert hall as his thesis for his final year at the School of Architecture. The exhibition of his drawings coincided with the destruction by fire of the old Philharmonic Hall in Hope Street. Rowse was commissioned to design a replacement, and he recruited Rice to help him. The building was in Streamline Moderne style. Sharples comments, "the executed design is markedly similar to [Rice's] thesis, both in the massing of the exterior and the arrangement of the auditorium." When the new hall was opened in 1939, The Manchester Guardian commented, "The magnificent compliment Liverpool has paid to the cause of music in England almost takes one's breath away ... a hall of great size, noble proportions, and up-to-date appointments ... ready to take its place among the most eminent homes of musical culture in this or any other country".

Rowse collaborated closely with the sculptor Edmund Thompson, whose work includes the gilded relief panels in the foyers of the Philharmonic Hall, and the incised murals depicting the Muses on the interior walls of the auditorium. For Rowse's Mersey Tunnel, Thompson, with George T Capstick, designed a relief in Art Deco style showing two winged bulls, "symbolic of swift and heavy traffic". Rowse's Portland stone ventilation towers for the tunnel are also decorated with sculptures by Thompson and Capstick.

The Second World War brought Rowse's career to a temporary stop. He moved to Anglesey, where he served as High Sheriff in 1942–43. He was a member of the Council of the RIBA from 1944 to 1950. After the war his main work included the supervision of the restoration of India Buildings, which had been severely damaged by German bombing. He advised the Belgian government on post-war reconstruction, and was awarded the Order of Leopold II in 1950. For the British government he designed diplomatic buildings in 1951, built in Delhi and Karachi. Shortly before his death his practice won the competition for the renovation of the Rows in Chester.

Rowse died at the age of 74 at his home, Chapel House, Puddington, Cheshire.

== Works ==
- Heswall Golf Club House, Wirral, 1924
- Housing schemes at Whiston, Lancashire, 1924
- India Buildings, Liverpool, 1924–32
- Housing at Rainhill, Lancashire, 1925
- Martins Bank head office, Water Street, Liverpool, 1927–32
- Lloyd's Bank, Church Street, Liverpool, 1928–32
- Additions to St Paul's Eye Hospital and Royal Southern Hospital, Liverpool, 1929
- Flats, Camden Street, Birkenhead, 1931
- Queensway Tunnel (Mersey Tunnel), Liverpool, tunnel entrances, toll booths and ventilation building exteriors, 1931–34
- Philharmonic Hall, Liverpool, 1936–39
- Offices for Pilkington's Glass Works, St Helens, 1937
- College of the Pharmaceutical Society, London, 1937–60
- UK Pavilion, Empire Exhibition, Glasgow, 1938
- Woodchurch Estate, Birkenhead, 1946.

Source: Sharples.

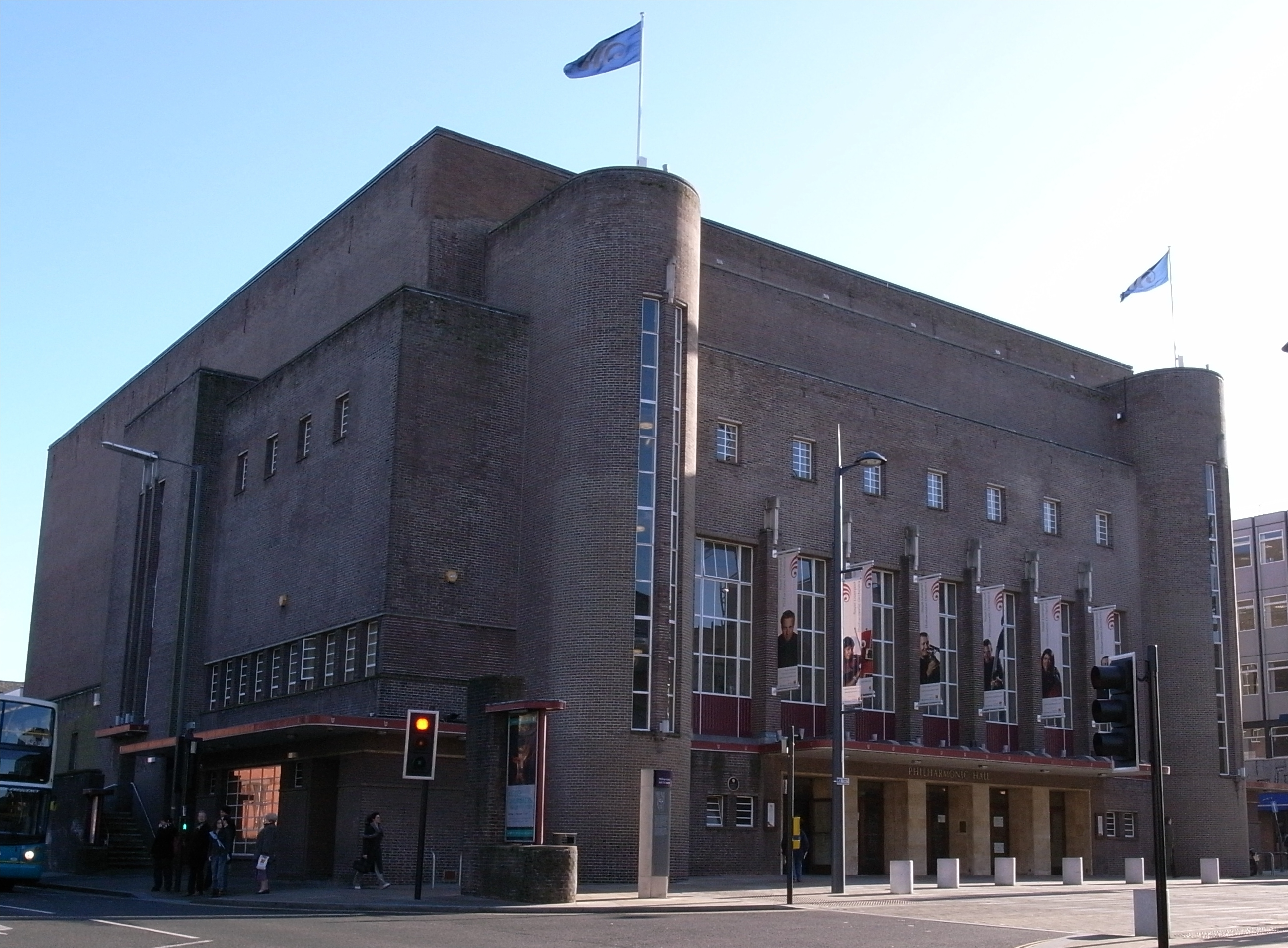
The Philharmonic Hall

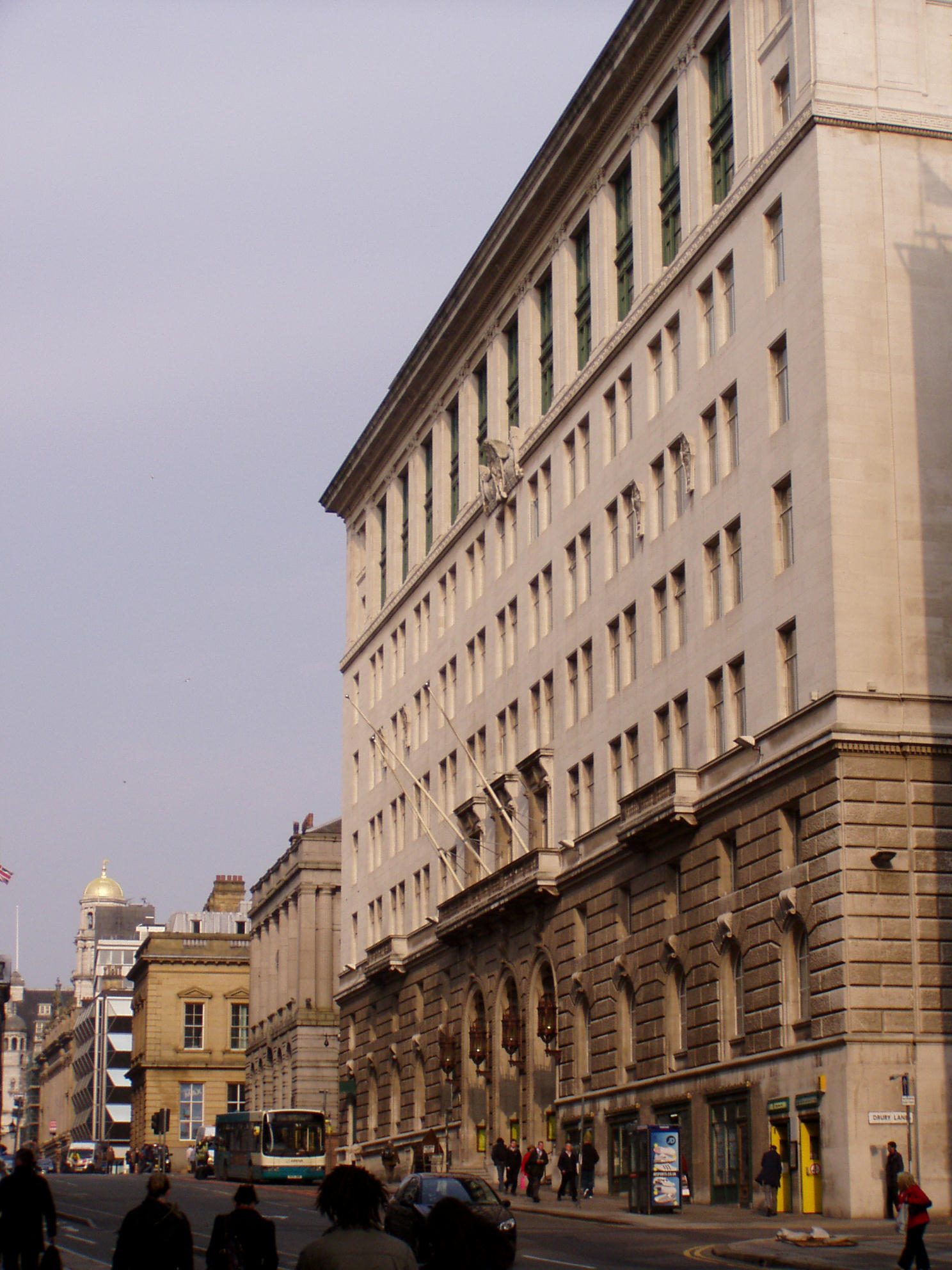
India Buildings

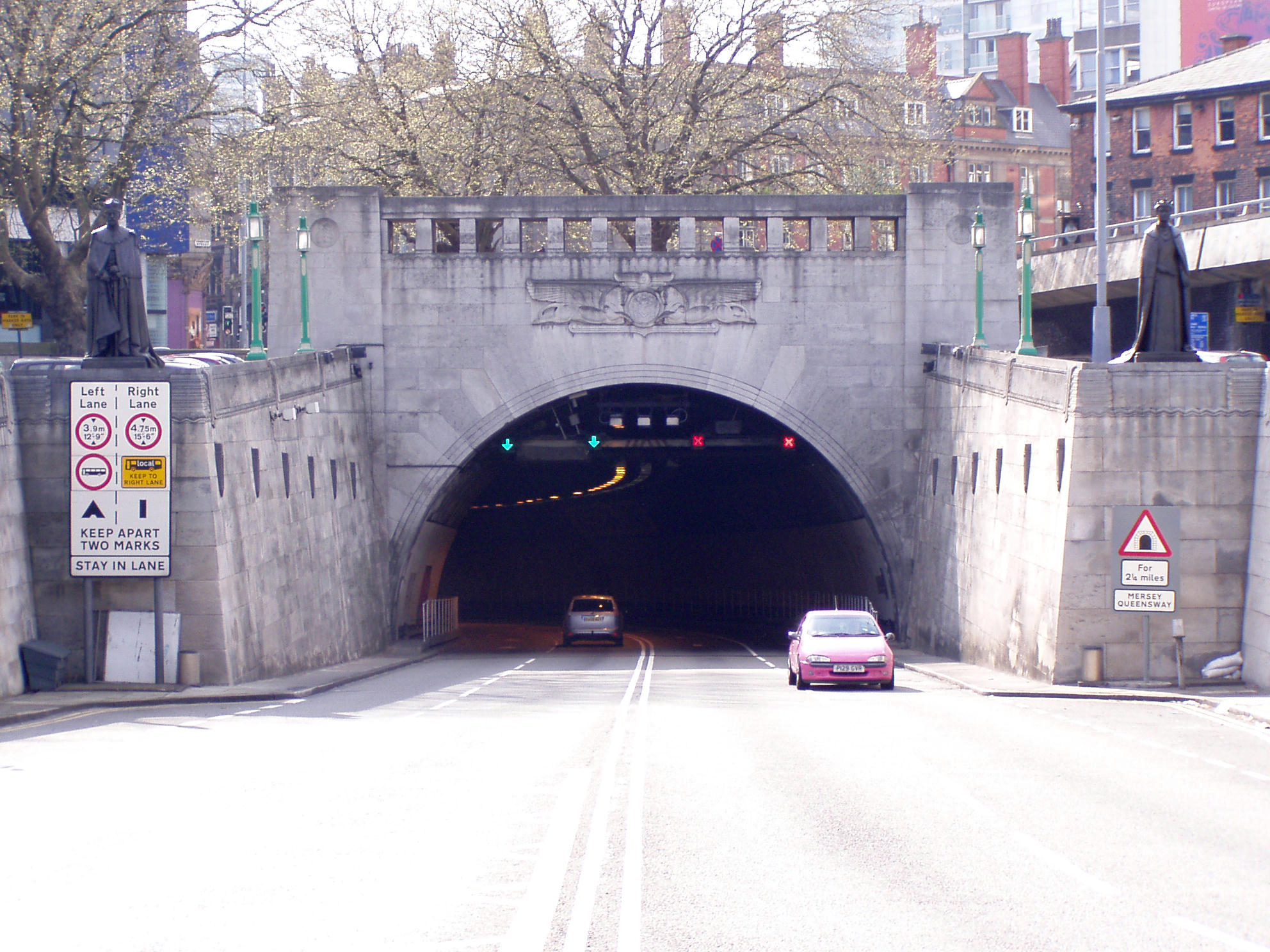
Mersey Tunnel entrance

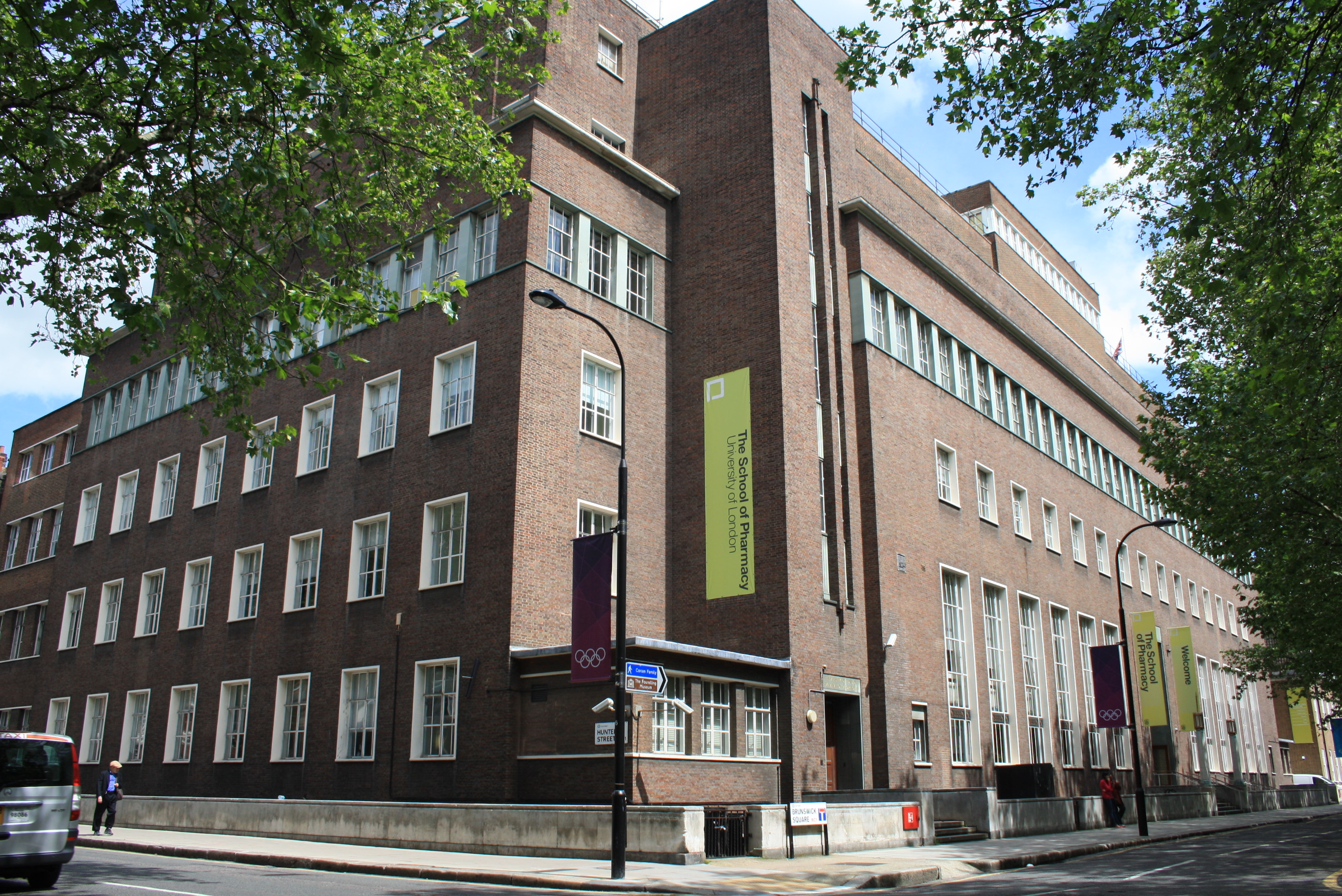
College of the Pharmaceutical Society

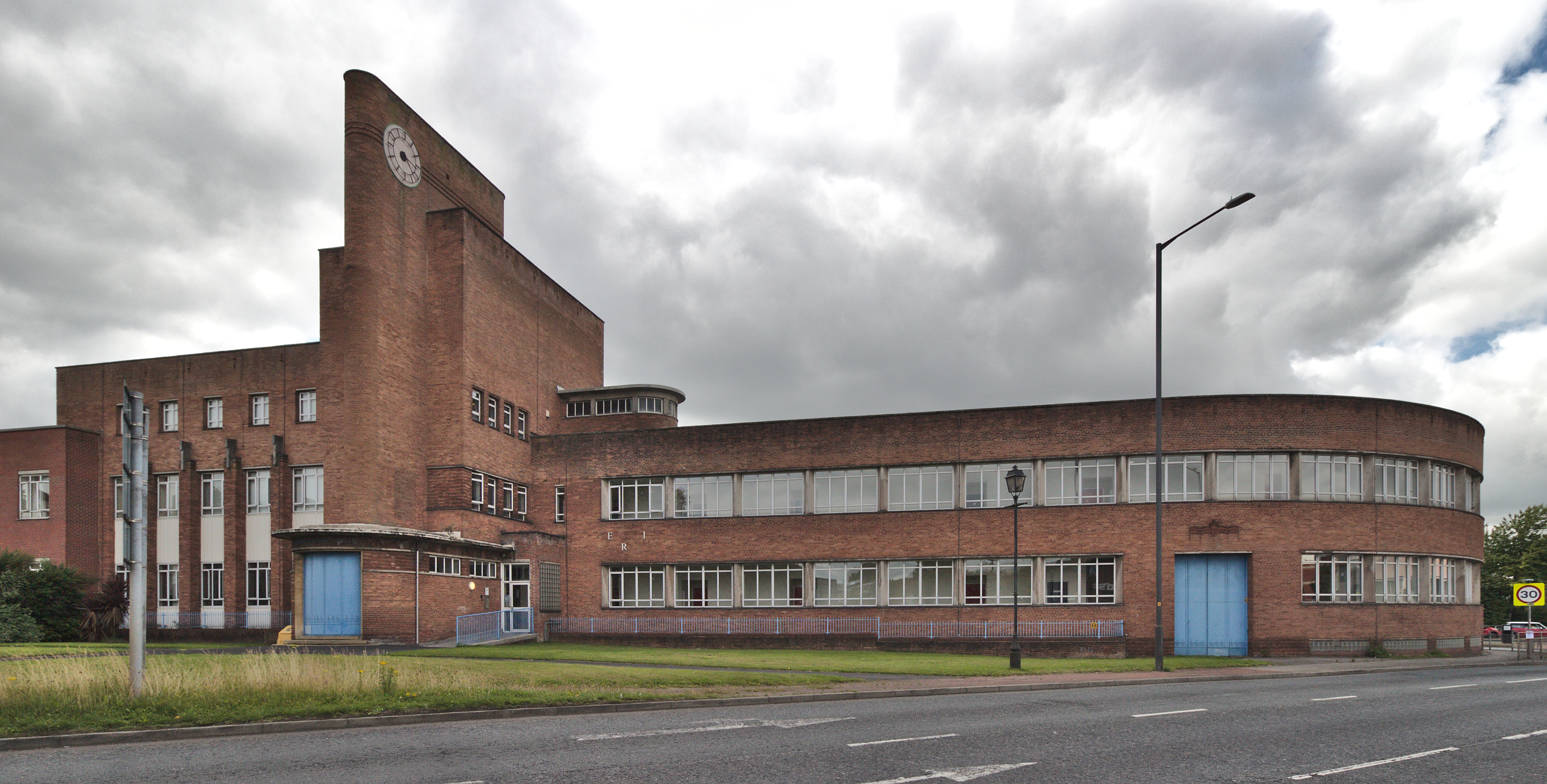
Reflection Court, St Helens 2 (former Pilkington's Glass Works head office)
