= Martins Bank =

London former private bank

Martins Bank Limited

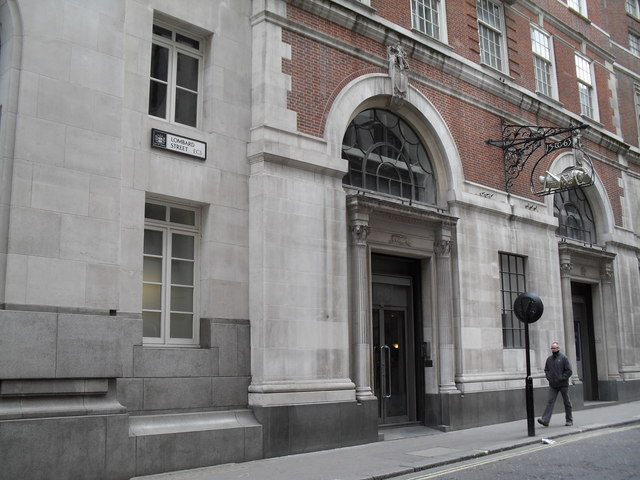
- Former London City branch of Martins Bank, erected 1930 at 68 Lombard Street, with the bank's trademark grasshopper sign
- Type: Joint-stock
- Industry: Banking
- Founded: 1831
- Defunct: 1969
- Fate: Acquired by Barclays Bank
- Successor: Barclays Bank Limited
- Headquarters: 4 Water Street, Liverpool 2
- Subsidiaries: Lewis's Bank Limited
- Website: Barclays Group Archives: Martins Bank

Martins Bank was a London private bank, trading for much of its time under the symbol of "The Grasshopper", that could trace its origins back to Thomas Gresham and the London goldsmiths, from which it developed into a bank known as Martin's Bank from 1890. That bank was acquired in 1918 by the Bank of Liverpool, which wanted Martins to give it a London presence and a seat on the London Bankers' Clearing House. The Martin name was retained in the title of the enlarged bank which was known as the Bank of Liverpool and Martins Limited. The title was shortened to Martins Bank Limited (without an apostrophe) in 1928 at the insistence of the directors of the Lancashire and Yorkshire Bank when it was bought by the Bank of Liverpool and Martins. The head office and managerial control remained firmly in Liverpool, cementing Martins' place as the only English national bank to have its head office outside London. It was taken over in 1969 by Barclays.

== History ==
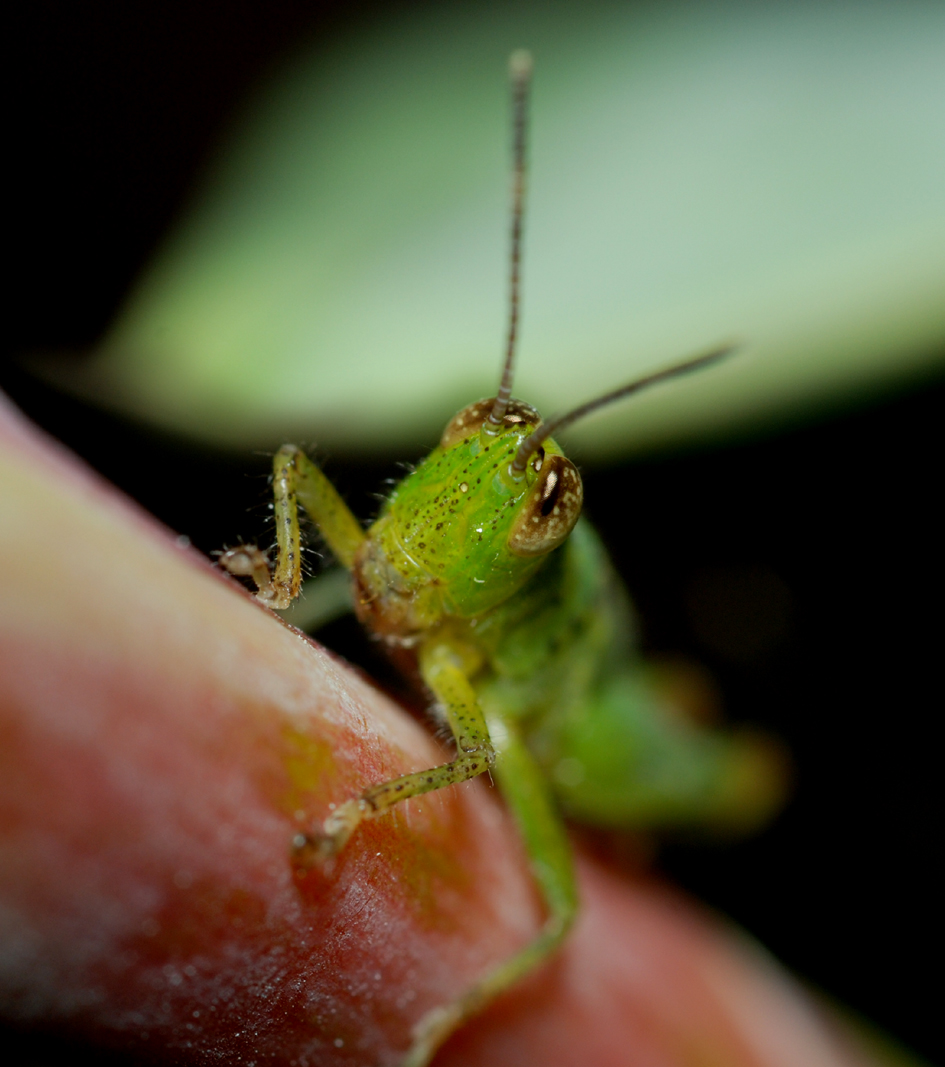
The sign under which the Bank traded was that of a grasshopper.

The history of Martins Bank is intertwined with the Grasshopper, the sign under which the Bank traded and was known in its early years. Tradition has it that Thomas Gresham, whose family crest included a grasshopper, founded the bank in 1563. However, although he is believed to be the first to use the sign of the Grasshopper on a goldsmith's shop in Lombard Street he does not appear to have had any connection with the Martins. Chandler states that there are differences of opinion as to when the Grasshopper became a bank and John Martin did not purchase the freehold of the Grasshopper until 1741.

The Martin family were among the early London Goldsmiths. In 1558 Richard Martin was elected a liveryman of the Goldsmiths Company and later a Master of the Mint and Lord Mayor of the City of London. Successive generations of Martins ran the bank that was popularly referred to as "The Grasshopper" but the partnership went through various incarnations, including Martins, Stone and Blackwell, and Martin Stone and Foote in the eighteenth century; and Martin and Company in 1844.

The London private bankers typically confined themselves to their one office, although Martins did have the occasional branch where individual partners lived. It meant that, compared with the joint-stock banks, Martins' growth was limited. Following the panic that followed the collapse of Barings Bank in 1890, Martins finally decided to become a limited company (1891). This prompted a more expansionist approach but the bank "thought only of amalgamations with other private banks". There was an unsuccessful approach to Cocks Biddulph, with which there were family links, but the realisation that "expansion to the provinces was now essential" led to the bank agreeing, in 1914, to its acquisition by the Bank of Liverpool, which had been founded in 1831 in Liverpool, England. The Martins name had valuable prestige and a seat on the London Bankers' Clearing House; when the delayed "merger" was consummated in 1918 after the conclusion of the First World War, the family name was retained in the title Bank of Liverpool and Martins.

The name was subsequently shortened to Martins Bank Limited in 1928. The change of name was at the insistence of the directors of the Lancashire and Yorkshire Bank, whose former HQ at 43 Spring Gardens Manchester became Martins' Manchester district office. By 1928, the bank had expanded to some 560 branches and had a logo featuring a grasshopper, which was the crest of Sir Thomas Gresham, and a Liver bird, the logo of the Bank of Liverpool. The combined coat of arms was duly registered by the College of Heralds. The heraldic description of the coat of arms is as follows: "Or, a Liver bird (or Cormorant) Sable, holding in the beak a branch of Laver (or Seaweed) Vert, on a Chief of the third a Grasshopper of the first."

Directors of Martins Bank included Edward Stanley, 18th Earl of Derby, The Queen Mother's younger brother The Hon. Sir David Bowes-Lyon and Colonel Robert Buxton DSO MA-Oxon (Imperial Camel Corps friend of T. E. Lawrence).

Between 1958 and 1967 Martins Bank owned and operated Lewis's Bank which had branches in each of the Lewis's Department Stores (not to be confused with John Lewis) and also in Selfridges in London. Lewis's Bank was sold to Lloyds Bank in 1967 and lasted until at least the 1980s.

A new headquarters building for Martins Bank Limited was designed by the architect Herbert James Rowse in the classical revival style and opened in 1932 at 4 Water Street, Liverpool, replacing the previous headquarters at 7 Water Street.

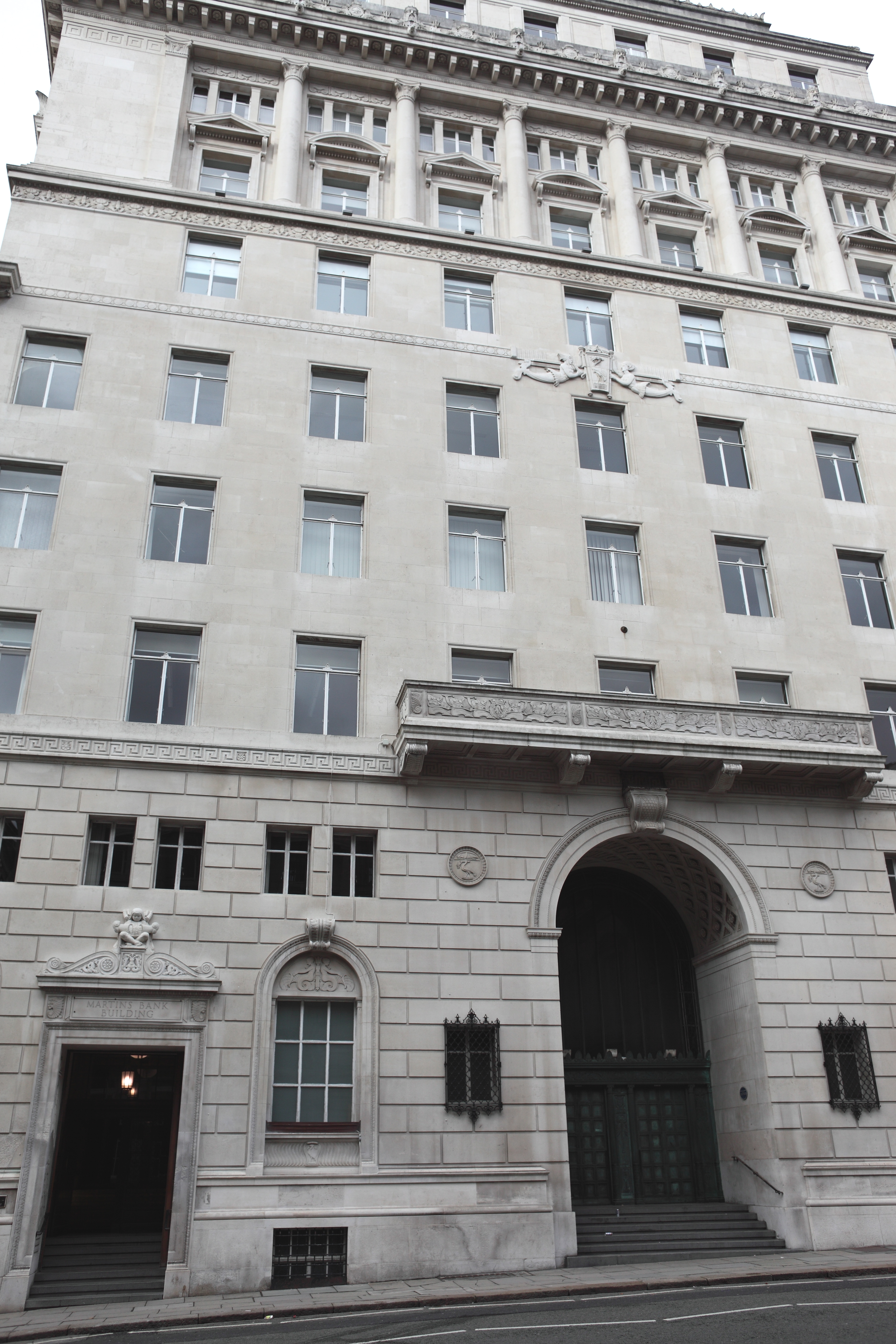
Martins Bank Building, Liverpool.

Barclays Bank Act 1969
- Act of Parliament
- Parliament of the United Kingdom
- Long title: An Act to carry into effect the transfer to Barclays Bank Limited of the undertaking of Martins Bank Limited; and for other purposes.
- Citation: 1969 c. xiii

Dates
- Royal assent: 16 May 1969
- Commencement: 1 January 1970

Status: Current legislation

Text of statute as originally enacted

The bank was bought by Barclays Bank in 1969, when all of its 700 branches became branches of Barclays. Around 30 branches closed immediately, and ten were downgraded to sub-branches. Some, such as the sub-branch at Eaton, Norwich, Norfolk were brand new and handed over to Barclays on the day appointed by Act of Parliament for the merger of the two banks, 15 December 1969. The Martins grasshopper logo was retained for part of the combined business until the early 1980s, with "Martins Branch" and a small grasshopper appearing first on both statements and cheque books, later cheques only.

== Martins Bank Archive ==
Martins Bank Archive has been collecting images and items relating to Martins Bank since 1989. Since 2009 the collection has been accessible online, with interested parties emailing requests for (or donations of) information or images, via the archive website. Since 2011 Martins Bank Archive has carried the newsletter of the Grasshopper Pensioners' Club, a group of former Martins Staff whose activities are funded partly through subscription, and partly by Barclays. The site is run in association with, but independently of, Barclays, who provide several thousand images of the bank's branches as they were between the 1930s and 1969. At 24 June 2013 the archive website comprises 1,116 pages of information and images relating to more than 900 known branches and former branches of Martins Bank. The archive has pieced together a staff database of more than 100,000 entries, from existing paper records, and can provide limited information to family tree researchers. Career details are available dating back to the late 1800s for some staff, but in the main the records cover the period 1946 to 1969. The database also covers new entrants, staff transfers and promotions, marriages, retirements and deaths. Martins Bank Archive is also home to a separate archive for Lewis's Bank, covering the period 1958 to 1967. A staff database for this period is also maintained.

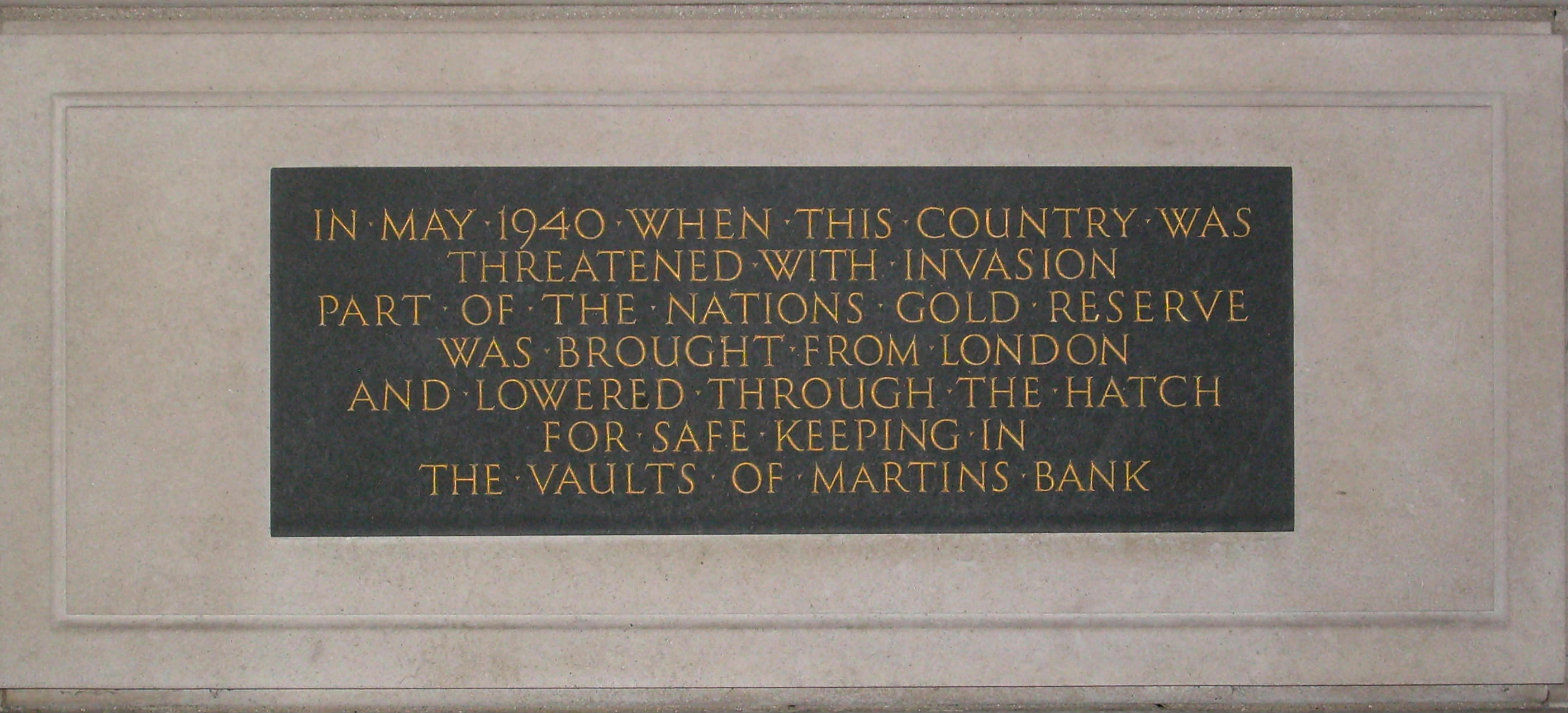

== Liverpool Head Office ==
The Liverpool Head Office of Martins Bank is a Grade II* listed building designed by Herbert Rowse and opened in 1932. It has been described as Rowse's "masterpiece... and among the very best interwar classical buildings in the country." During the Second World War, the bulk of Britain's gold reserves were secretly moved under Operation Fish from the Bank of England to the vaults of Martins Bank in Liverpool; the operation overseen by Martins' Chief Inspector, Donald Lynch FIOB RBA. This was dramatised in the film The Bullion Boys.

== In popular culture ==
The 1971 film version of Dad's Army featured the fictional Walmington-on-Sea branch of Martins Bank, actually the Crown pub in Chalfont St Giles.

Martins Bank worked in association with the Kiddicraft Toy Company and Metcalfe Models to provide toys with the bank's logo on them. These included miniature cheque and paying-in books, and cardboard construction kits for model railway enthusiasts. In 1968, shortly before becoming part of the Barclays Group of Companies, Martins issued what became a commemorative grasshopper money box in clear yellow plastic. This was given to children who opened savings accounts, along with a gilt brooch.
