= Mann Island =

Area of Liverpool, England

Coordinates: 53.404°N 2.996°W

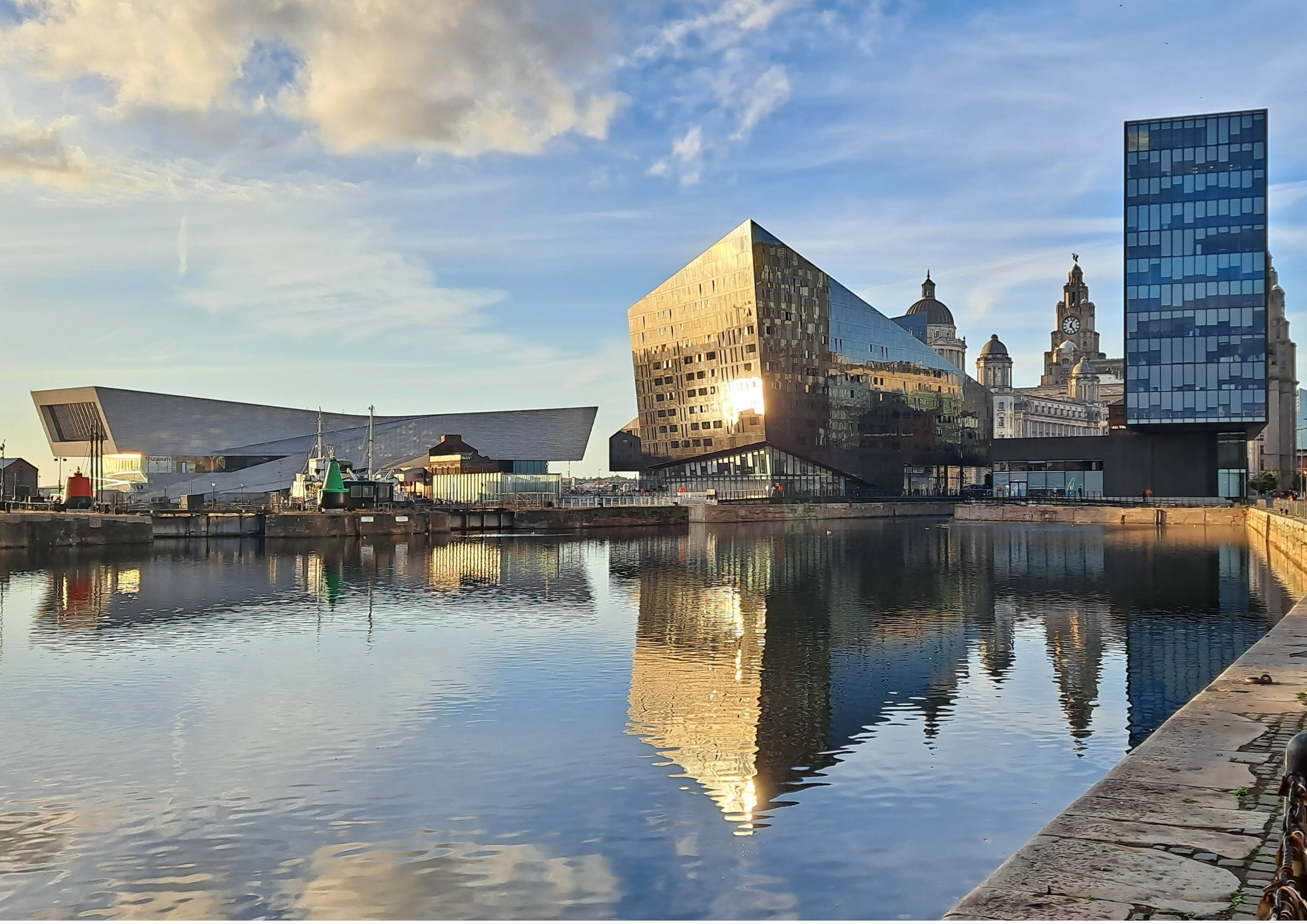
- Mann Island waterfront

- Location within Merseyside
- OS grid reference: SJ 339 901
- Metropolitan borough: Liverpool
- Metropolitan county: Merseyside
- Region: North West
- Country: England
- Sovereign state: United Kingdom
- Post town: LIVERPOOL
- Postcode district: L3
- Police: Merseyside
- Fire: Merseyside
- Ambulance: North West

Mann Island is a small area in Liverpool, England. It lies on the waterfront next to the River Mersey between the Albert Dock to the south and the Pier Head to the north.

== History ==
Mann Island was formed in the 18th and 19th centuries as part of the Liverpool dock complex. It was a virtual island, with Georges Dock to the north, Canning Dock to the east and south, and the River Mersey to the west. It was connected to the shoreline by a narrow neck of land opposite James Street.

It was the site of the Manchester Dock, opening onto the river, and two graving docks, opening into Canning Dock. It was also the location of the Great Western Railway warehouses, and the Mersey Railway pumping station, all of which are Grade II listed buildings. Later, in the 20th century, it was the site for the James Street station of the Liverpool Overhead Railway.

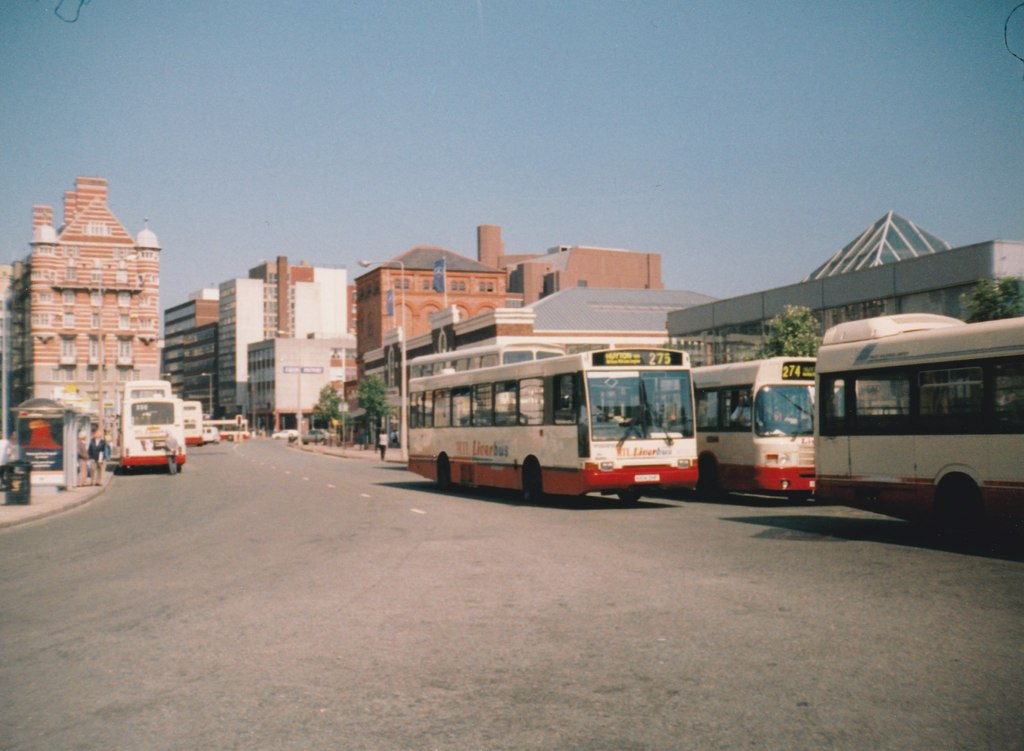
Mann Island buses (1997)

The site ceased to be an "island" in 1899 when the Georges Dock was filled in to provide building land for the Port of Liverpool Building, and it became physically joined to the Pier Head. Mann Island was previously known as Mersey Island. Despite ceasing to be an island following the filling in of George's Dock, it retained its name, derived from an oil-stone dealer John Mann, who died in 1784. The name was continued in the roadway which extended into the Pier Head from James Street. During the 20th century, Mann Island served as a tram and bus terminus for routes serving the south of the city, adjoining the Pier Head bus terminus serving the north.

Mann Island has been the subject of a number of regeneration schemes, such as the ill-starred Fourth Grace project, which was under consideration from 2002 to 2006. When this was cancelled, it was replaced by a three part redevelopment scheme.

== Current use ==
Mann Island has been subject to three redevelopment schemes. The first, occupying the third of the site next to the river, is the Museum of Liverpool, which replaced the Museum of Liverpool Life, opening on 19 July 2011. Secondly, the Liverpool Canal Link, which cuts through Mann Island via a lock system into the Canning Dock. The third, occupying the shoreside half of the site, are the Mann Island Buildings which are three modernist mixed-use private enterprise buildings.
