= Mann Island Buildings =

Group of buildings in Liverpool, England

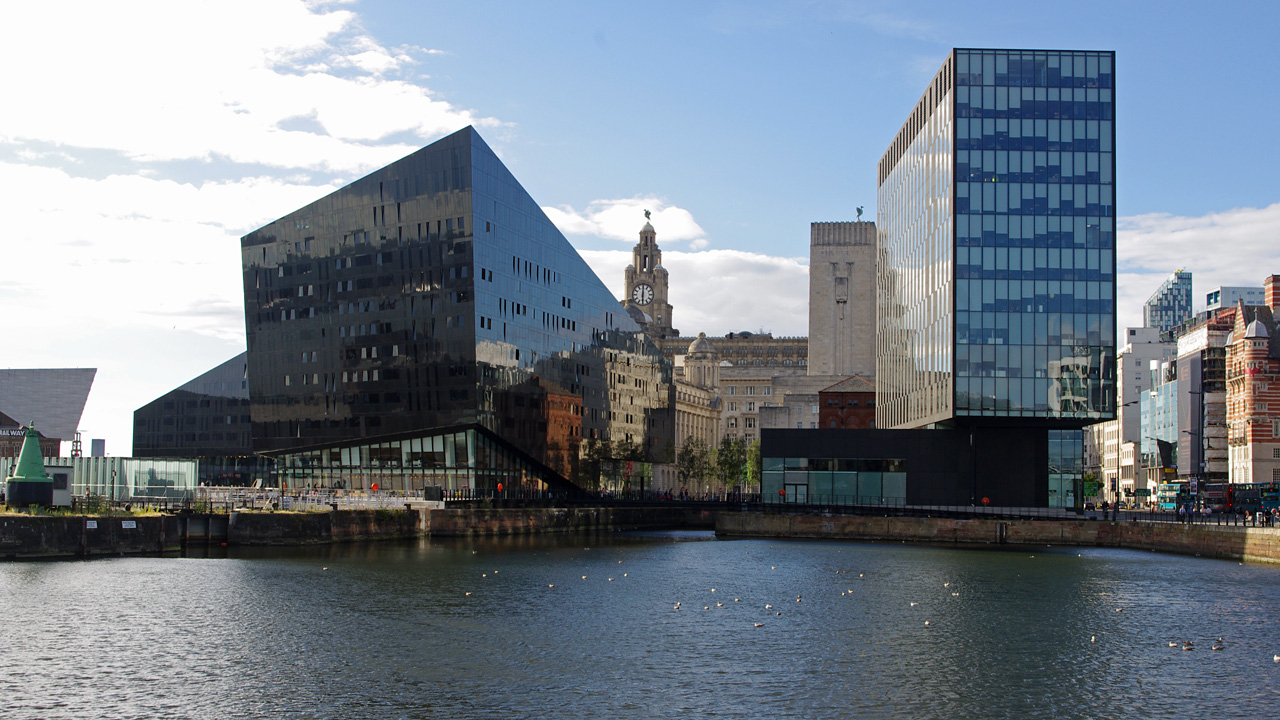
- Mann Island in 2018
- Interactive map of the Mann Island Buildings area

General information
- Location: Mann Island, Liverpool, England, United Kingdom
- Coordinates: 53.4038°N 2.9943°W
- Construction started: 2008
- Estimated completion: 2011
- Owner: Merseytravel

Height
- Roof: Building 3; 52.9 m (174 ft); Building 2; 43.2 m (142 ft); Building 1; 42.2 m (138 ft)

Technical details
- Floor count: 13, 13, 13

Design and construction
- Architect: Broadway Malyan
- Developer: Countryside Properties, Neptune Developments
- Services engineer: Cundall Johnston and Partners
- Main contractor: BAM

The Mann Island Buildings are a group of buildings in Liverpool, England. They comprise three international style mixed use buildings on Mann Island, which lies on the waterfront between the Port of Liverpool Building and the Albert Dock. No.1 building is owned by Merseytravel although several floors are leased out to other companies

== Background ==
Formerly rundown warehouses and dock buildings, the site directly between two of Liverpool's most historic buildings was heavily investigated before numerous proposals for new builds were submitted as part of a competition to create a 'Fourth Grace'. Three proposals were submitted, all of which received criticism for their appearance and contrast to the city's famed historic skyline.

The work of Alsop Architects was chosen to become the 'Fourth Grace', however, it was beset with difficulties, and was cancelled in 2004 due to spiralling costs. It was only after all of these ideas were scrapped when the £120 million Mann Island Development was chosen to become the new complex to occupy the site.

== The project ==
Construction of the buildings, which are similar in height to the nearby Port of Liverpool Building, Cunard Building and Royal Liver Building began in 2008 during Liverpool's year as European Capital of Culture (when regeneration within the city centre was at its peak). At the same time, work also began on a close neighbour to the Mann Island development - the Museum of Liverpool (not to be confused with World Museum Liverpool). Although the buildings have different heights and usage, each consists of 13 storeys. The Mann Island Buildings are home to 376 apartments (a mix of one, two and three bedroom), 75,000 sq ft (7,000 m^{2}) of retail/leisure units, 114,000 sq ft (10,600 m^{2}) of net office space and 20,000 sq ft (1,900 m^{2}) of covered space.

== The buildings ==
The three buildings are to the south of the Mann Island roadway, opposite the Port of Liverpool Building, and are numbered (from east to west) No.1, No.11 and No.15 Mann Island.

No.15, next to the Museum of Liverpool, is called the Latitude building and No.11 is the Longitude building. Connecting the two is a double-height glass atrium called Equator House which often hosts RIBA architectural displays and launch events for the Open Eye Gallery next-door. Both Latitude and Longitude are mixed commercial and residential spaces, with restaurants, cafés and galleries on the ground floor, and accommodation starting on the 2nd floor. There is a gap in the 1st floor, that was originally meant to be a mezzanine for the commercial spaces below, but this has now been adapted as private open plan office and co-working space.

Mann Island is home to the RIBA North gallery, opened in 2017.

No.1 Mann Island, next to the Strand, is occupied almost entirely by offices of the regional authority including the offices of the Mayor of the Liverpool City Region, Merseytravel and the Liverpool City Region Combined Authority. Two levels of car-parking extend beneath the Latitude and Longitude buildings, which is shared between residents and Combined Authority staff.

Mann Island is home to the RIBA North gallery, opened in 2017.

== Reception ==
Critical response to the development has been mixed. Alistair Sutherland (designer of Preston Crown Court and panel member of LUDCAP) declared it "a positive contribution" to the waterfront, and "a complementary contrast" to its neighbours; others have been more critical. The Daily Post in particular lamented the loss of several key views of the Pier head World Heritage Site.

In 2012, it was nominated alongside the ArcelorMittal Orbit and Belfast's Titanic museum for the Carbuncle Cup, an architecture prize given annually by the magazine Building Design to "the ugliest building in the United Kingdom completed in the last 12 months."

In 2015 Mann Island scooped a RIBA North West award.

== Gallery ==
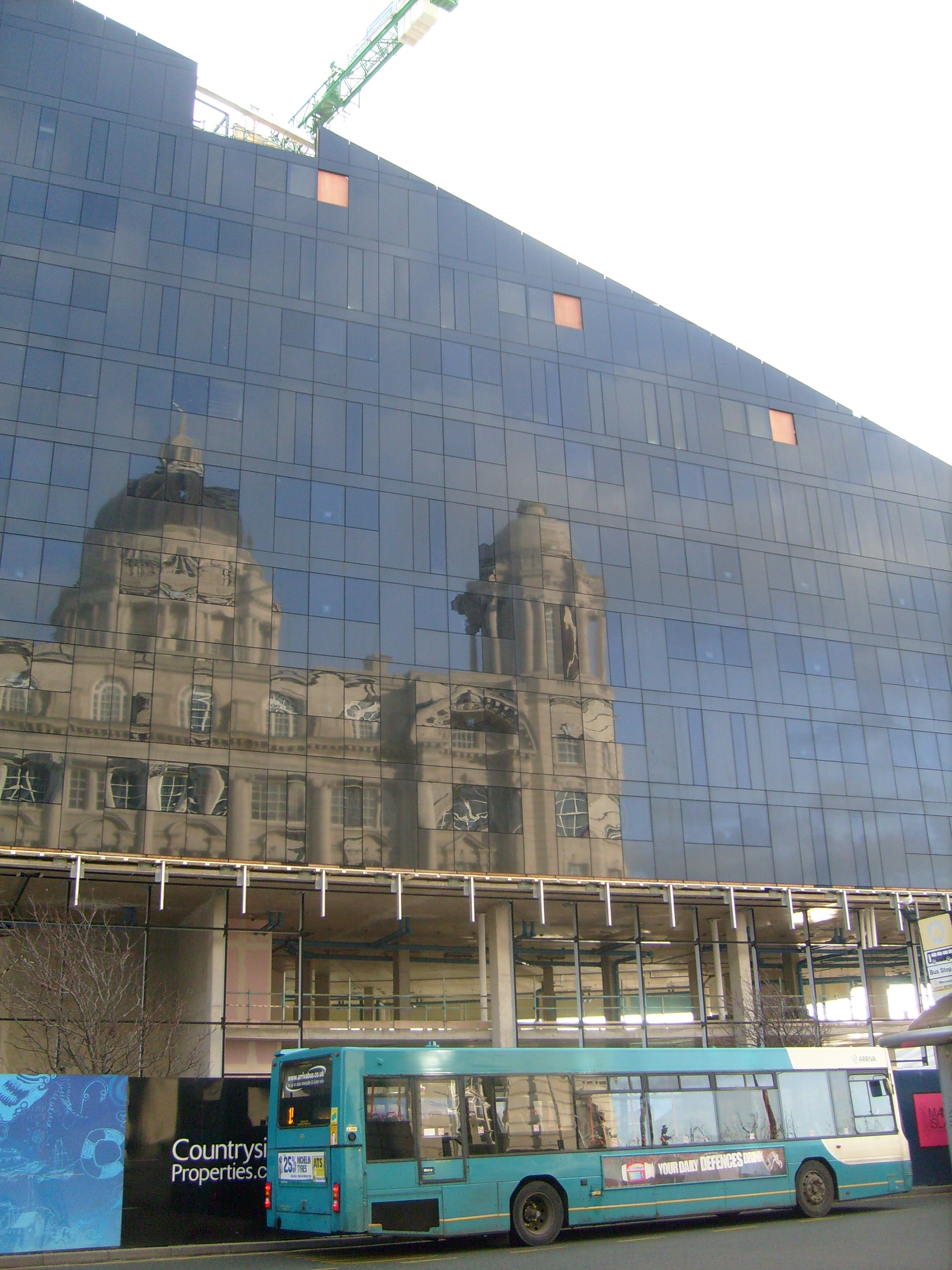
Reflection of the Port of Liverpool Building in No.15 Mann Island (Building 1)

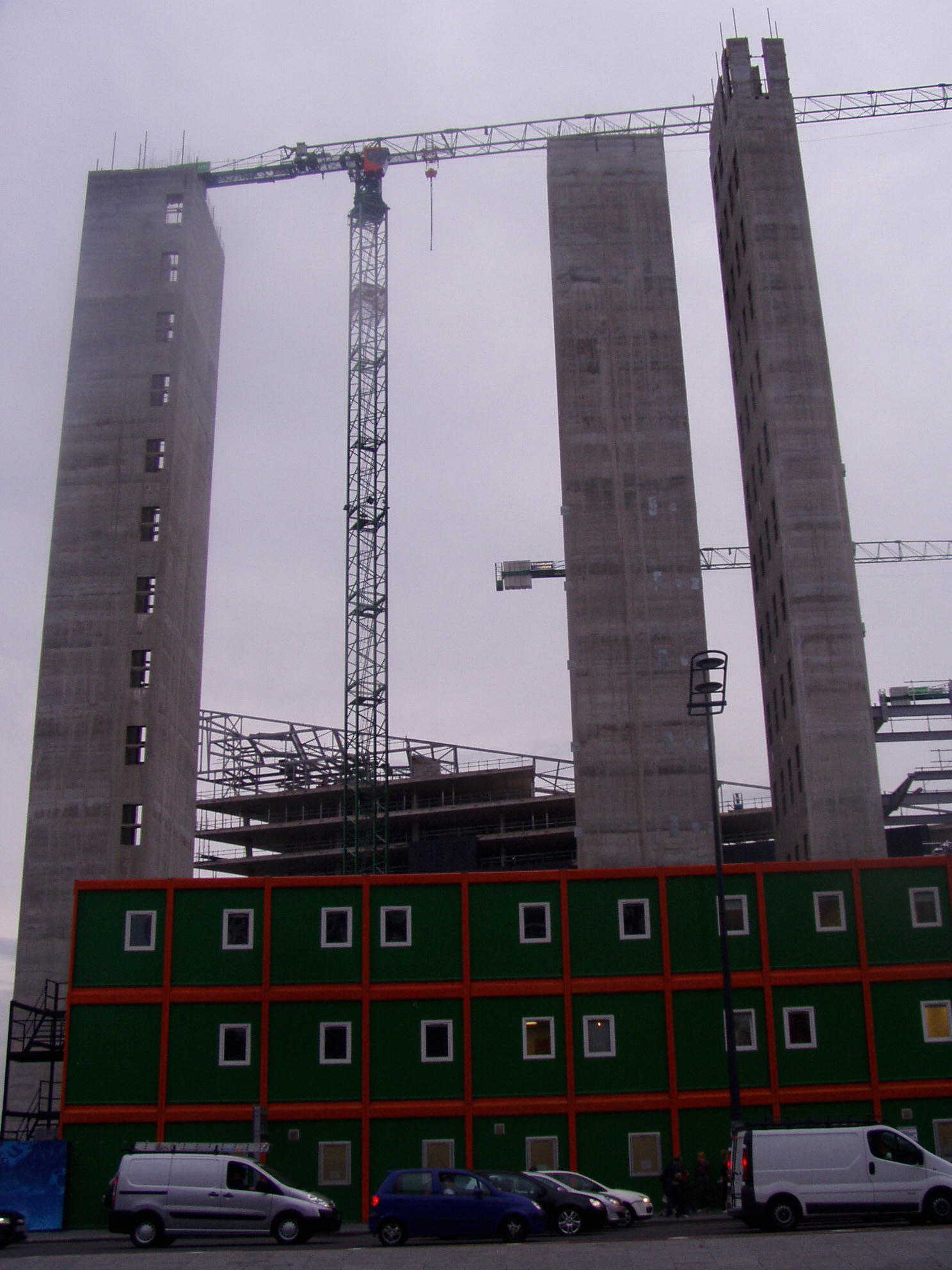
Structural cores of No. 1 (Building 3) exposed during construction

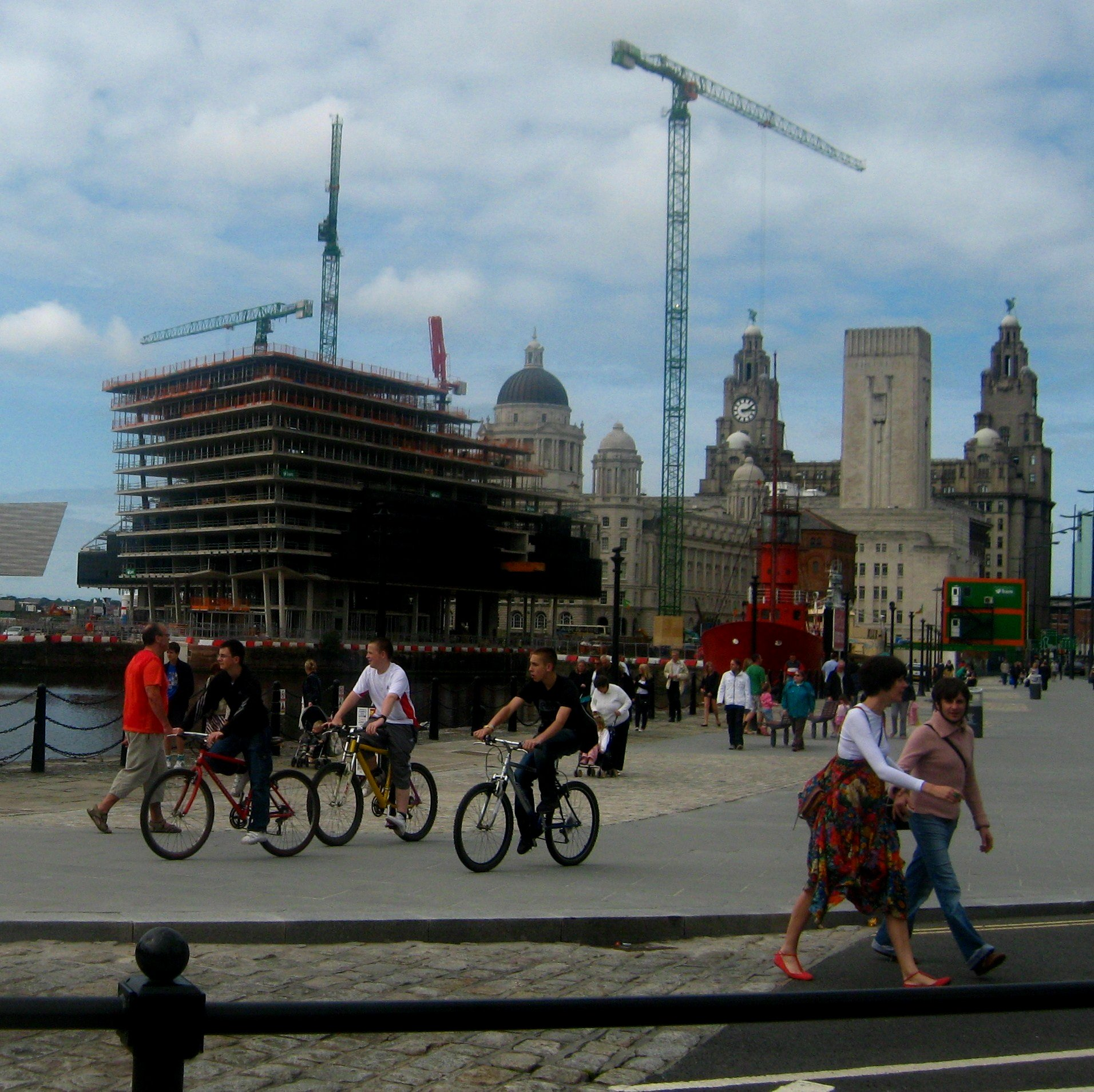
The framework of No.11 (Building 2)

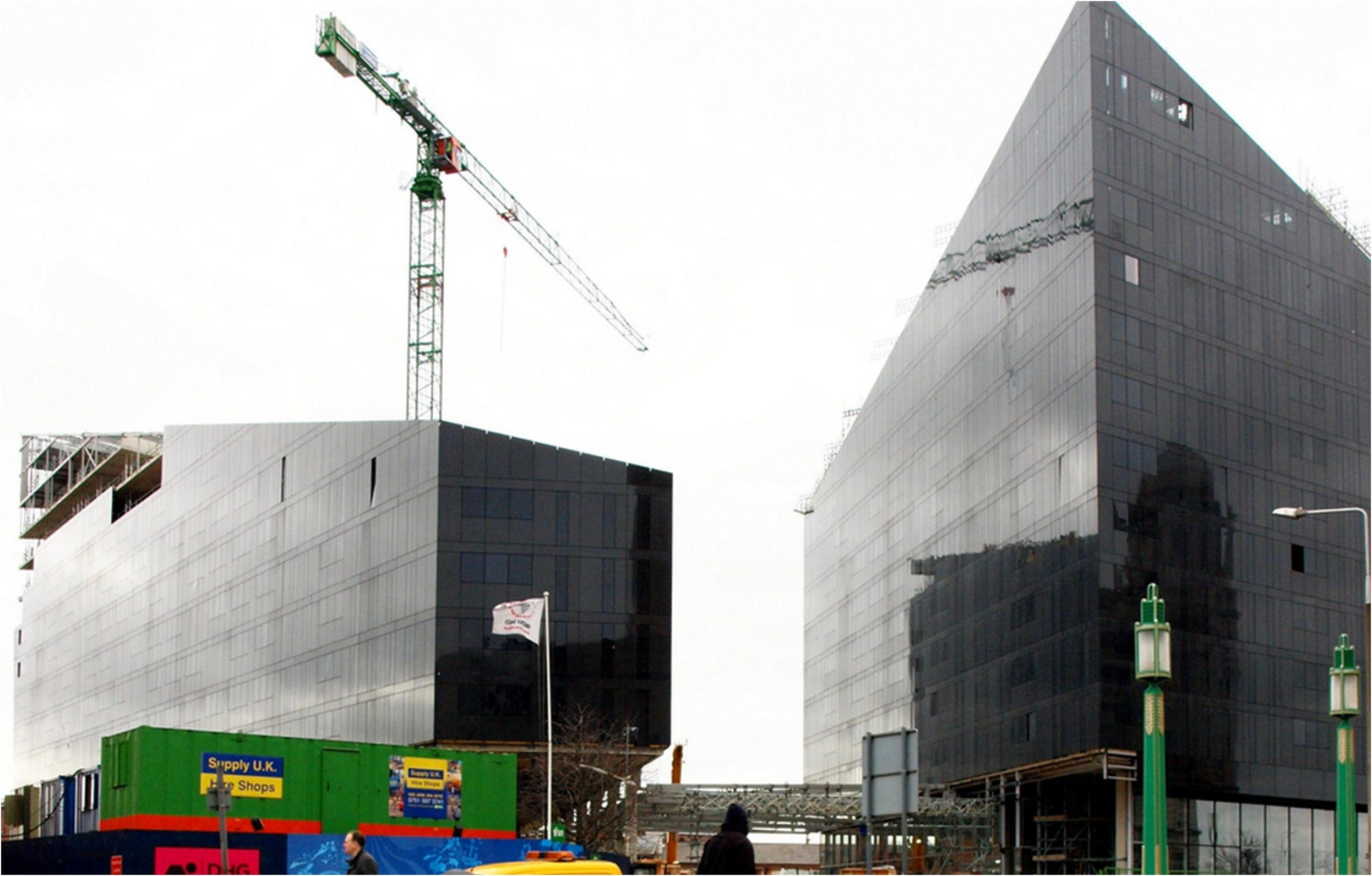
Nos. 15 and 11 (Buildings 1 and 2) with a largely complete exterior

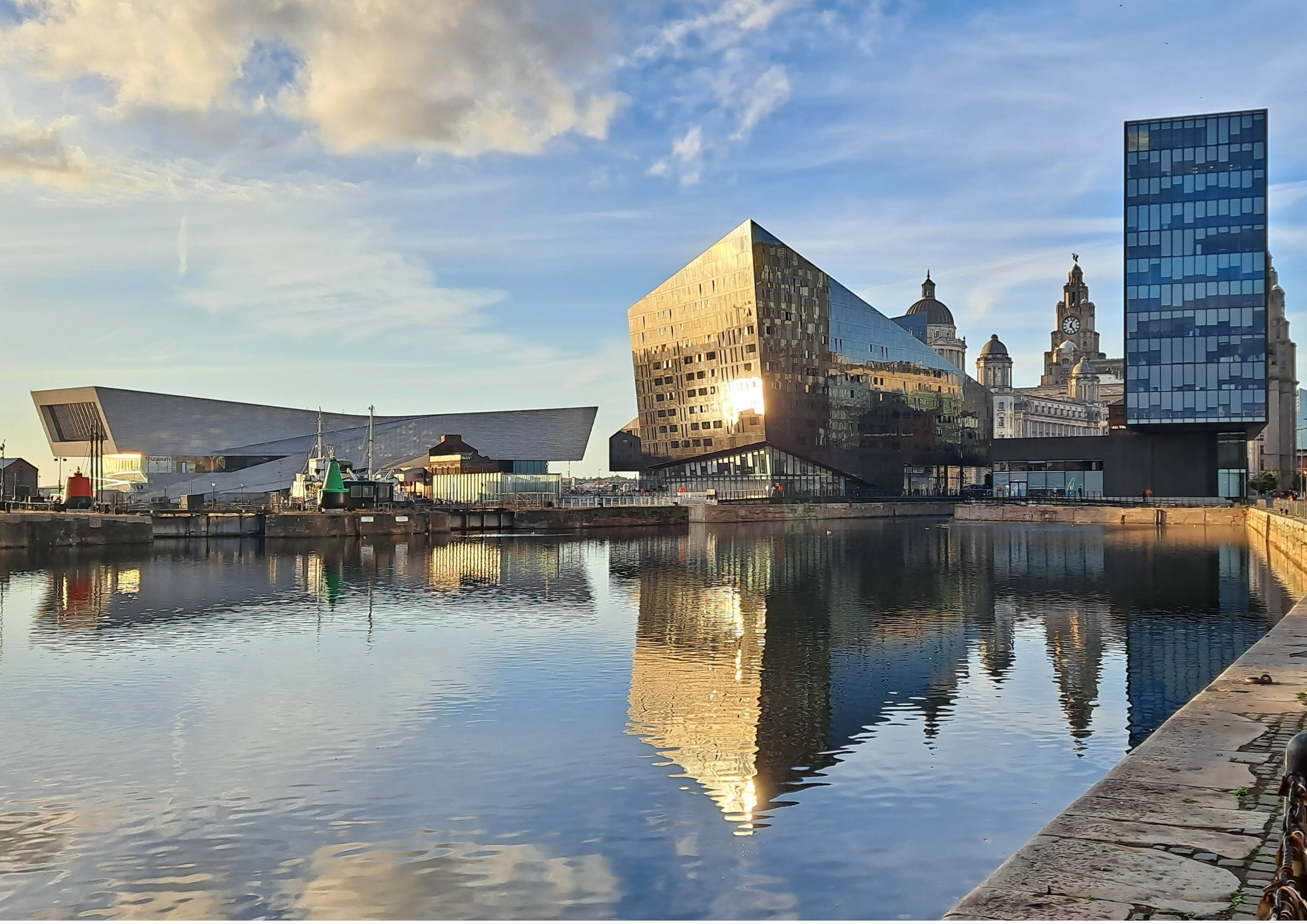
Mann Island to the right of the Museum of Liverpool, 2023

== See also ==
- Fourth Grace
- List of tallest buildings and structures in Liverpool
