= Fourth Grace =

Abandoned development at the Pier Head, Liverpool

Coordinates: 53.4035°N 2.9945°W

The Fourth Grace was a planned development to be built on the Liverpool Pier Head, as a part of the Liverpool European Capital of Culture 2008 bid. The project name was derived from its location adjacent to the three historic buildings at the Pier Head site, known as "the Three Graces". These are the Port of Liverpool Building, the Cunard Building and the Royal Liver Building.

Four proposals were submitted, all of which received criticism for their appearance and contrast to the city's famed historic skyline.

- 'Fourth Grace Foster' (seen as one of the most likely developments for the site, and named after architects Foster and Partners), comprised a triangular 145 m (476 ft) tower (which would have completely overshadowed the Three Graces), containing some 500 apartments alongside a 100-room 5-star hotel, and a block designed to resemble the hull of a ship extending out over the river. The development would have contained office space and a museum site.
- 'Fourth Grace Rogers', by the Richard Rogers Partnership, comprised two towers (1 and 2) of 125 m (410 ft) and 94 m (308 ft) respectively, and a mixed-use centre under an undulating roof.
- 'Fourth Grace 1 Cullinan', proposed by Edward Cullinan Architects, comprised two 135 m (443 ft) mixed use buildings, and a globe-shaped 1000-seat theatre.
- 'Fourth Grace Towers', a more conceptual design from architect firm Alsop, comprised a Zoomorphic style 118.50 m (389 ft) tower with residential, office and retail space, and a balloon-shaped structure ("the Cloud") containing the museum site.

Public consultation found the Cullinan design to be the favourite, while the Alsop design was the least popular amongst the public and in a survey of architects. Despite this, Alsop's 'Cloud' was the winning entry. However, it was beset with difficulties, and was cancelled in 2004 due to spiralling costs. Currently, it has been relocated to Toronto, Canada, where preliminary construction work is being undertaken.

All ideas were eventually scrapped in favour of the Mann Island Development, comprising the new Museum of Liverpool, the Liverpool Canal Link, and three modernist mixed-use private enterprise blocks, the Mann Island Buildings.
