= Georges Basin =

Georges Basin may refer to:

- Georges Basin in the Gulf of Maine
- George's Basin – a nineteenth-century dock in Liverpool, England
