= George's Basin =

Coordinates: 53.4063°N 2.9968°W

The George's Basin was a dock on the River Mersey, England, within the Port of Liverpool. The basin surface covered 3 acres (1.2 ha) and was surrounded by George's Dock to the south, Prince's Dock to the north and the Mersey to the west.

Used as a berth for commercial shipping and as a dry dock for vessel repairs, the mouth of the basin was sealable with floodgates.

The basin was filled in 1874. In 1899, the adjoining George's Dock was filled in and the site was used to create what is now the Pier Head. This provided one central place for Liverpool Docks' offices, which had been scattered across different sites.

By March 2009 work was completed on a £22 million extension of the Leeds and Liverpool Canal on the site of the former basin. The canal extension provides a further 1.4 miles of navigable waterway.
