= George's Dock =

Former dock on the River Mersey, Liverpool, England

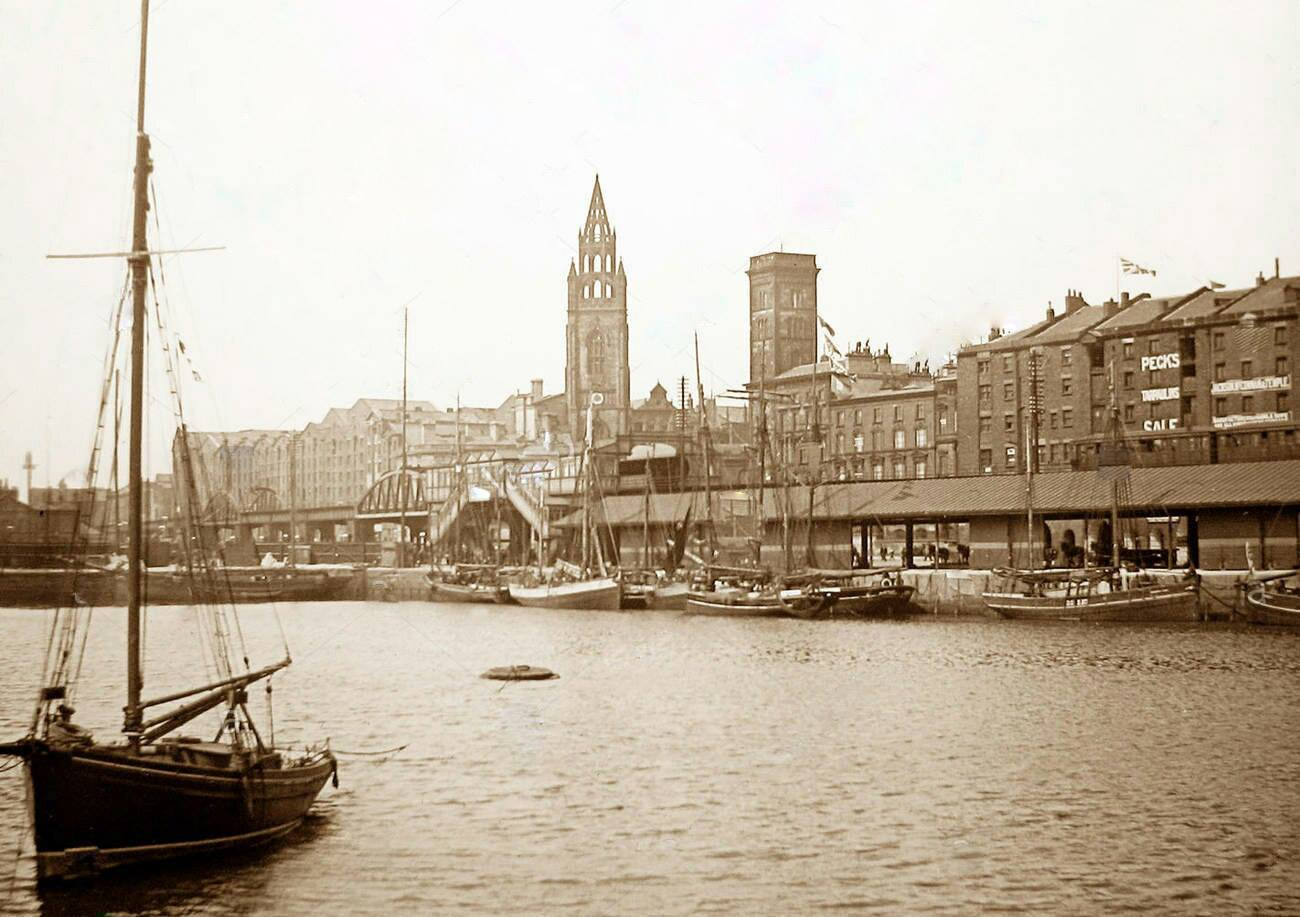
- An 1897 postcard of the dock, looking towards Church of Our Lady and Saint Nicholas, Liverpool

Location
- Location: Liverpool, United Kingdom
- Coordinates: 53.4050°N 2.9954°W
- OS grid: SJ338903

Details
- Opened: 1771
- Closed: 1899
- Type: Wet dock
- Area: 5 acres (2.0 ha), 2,593 sq yd (2,168 m^{2})
- Width at entrance: 41 ft 11 in (12.78 m)
- Quay length: 1,001 yd (915 m)

George's Dock was a dock, on the River Mersey, England, within the Port of Liverpool. It was connected to Canning Dock to the south and George's Basin to the north.

== History ==
Construction of the dock began in 1762, and was known as North Dock prior to completion. The dock, which opened in 1771, was designed and built by Henry Berry and named after the reigning monarch, King George III. The dock basin originally covered an area of slightly more than 3 acres (1.2 ha). The port built ships bound for West Africa, North America and the Caribbean delivering and returning with Black Slaves. Benefiting greatly from the endeavor with the population of Liverpool growing from seventeen thousand, to seventy seven thousand at the end of the 18th century.

The Goree Warehouses were built to the east of the dock in 1793, and were severely damaged during a fire in 1802. Which caused over £320,000 of damage. The dock was rebuilt and expanded between 1822–5, after losing its American and Caribbean shipping to Prince's Dock, being expanded by John Foster, Sr. Following the rebuild and expansion, the dock was mainly used by schooners carrying perishable goods.

The adjoining George's Basin was filled in 1874. In 1899-1900 the dock was filled in to create what is now the Pier Head, to provide one central place for Liverpool Docks' offices, which before were scattered across different sites. A section of the original George's Dock wall is still visible in the basement of the Cunard Building which stands on the site. The Goree Warehouses, which had been named after a slave market in West Africa, were destroyed by bombing during World War II.

By March 2009, work was completed on a £22 million extension of the Leeds and Liverpool Canal on the site of the former basin. The canal extension provides a further 1.4 miles of navigable waterway.

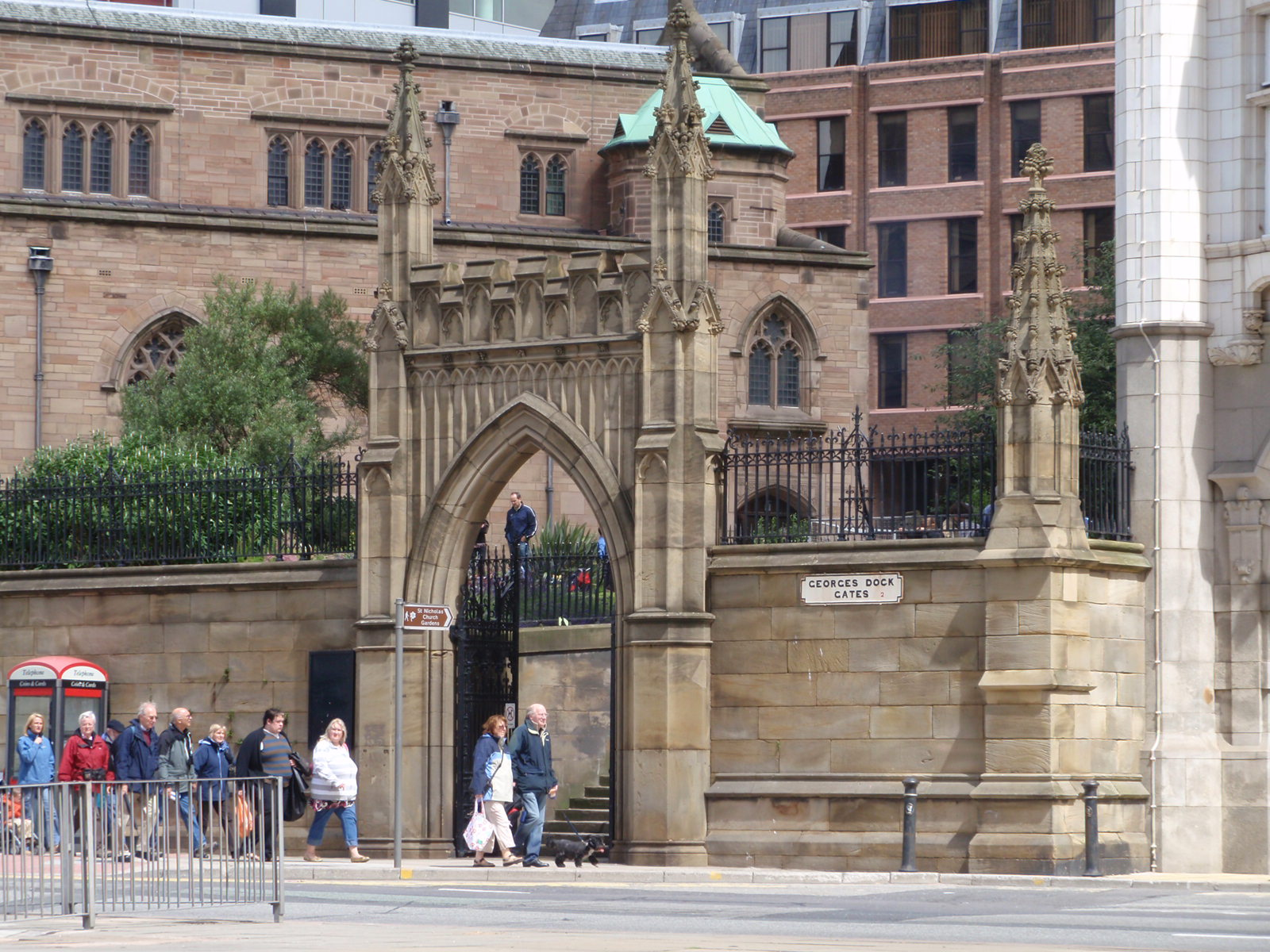
Remnant of George's Dock: a street name sign outside Church of Our Lady and Saint Nicholas, Liverpool
