= Museum of Liverpool =

Museum in Liverpool, England

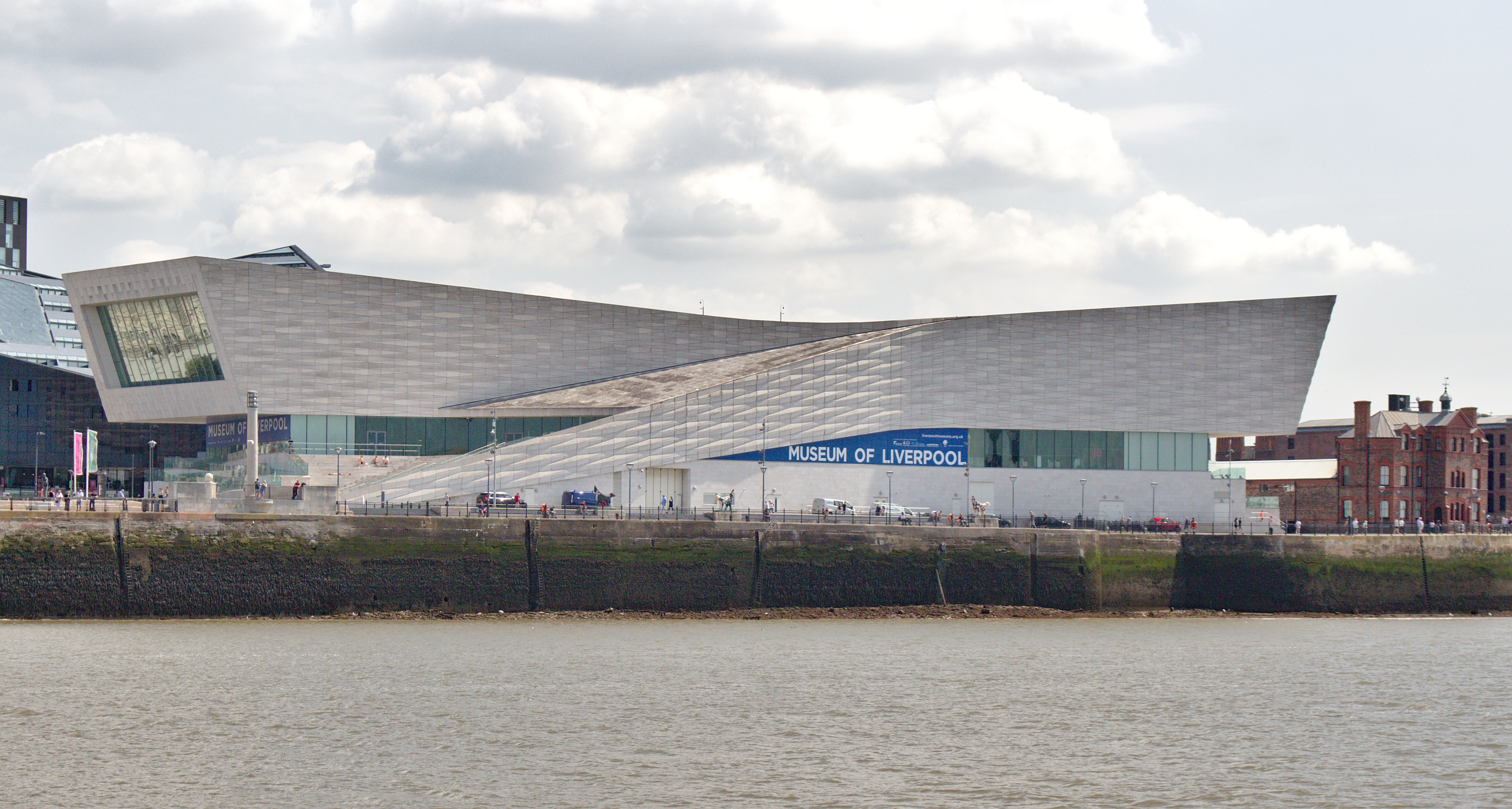

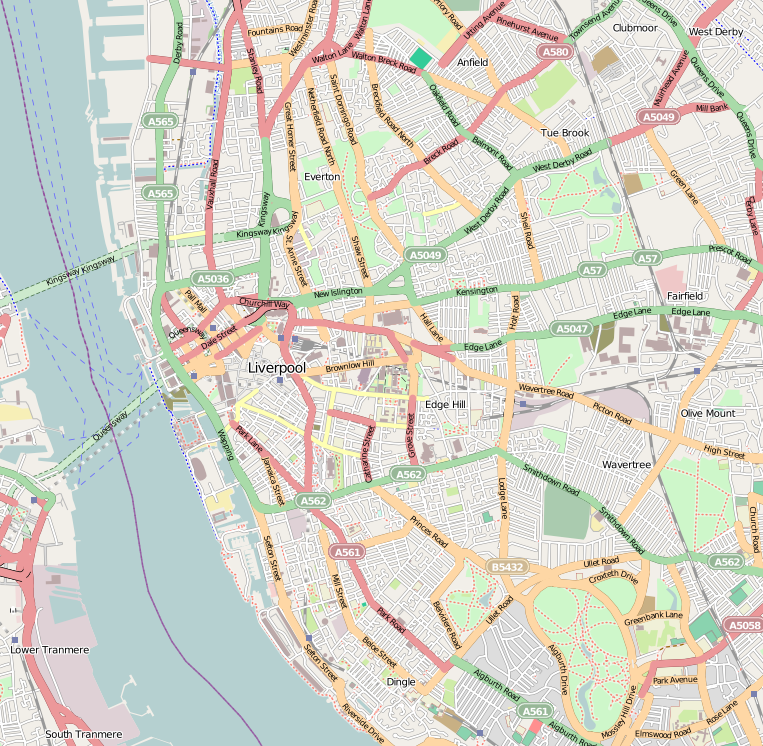
- Location in Liverpool Location in Merseyside
- Established: 2011
- Location: Pier Head, Liverpool, England,
- Coordinates: 53.4031°N 2.9956°W
- Visitors: 949,762 in 2025: Ranked 36th nationally
- Website: www.liverpoolmuseums.org.uk/mol

The Museum of Liverpool in Liverpool, England, tells the story of Liverpool and its people, and reflects the city's global significance. It opened in 2011 as newest addition to the National Museums Liverpool group replacing the former Museum of Liverpool Life. The museum is housed in a new purpose-built building on the Mann Island site at the Pier Head.

== History ==
The museum, which was designed by architects 3XN and engineers Buro Happold and built by Galliford Try at cost of £72 million, provides 8,000 square metres of exhibition space, housing more than 6,000 objects. It has flexible spaces that regularly change to enable National Museums Liverpool to show more of their collections. It was opened to the public on 19 June 2011. In January and February 2017, the museum was closed for two months for essential works.

From 10 to 12 December 2021, the museum hosted the G7 summit of foreign ministers.

== Core themes ==
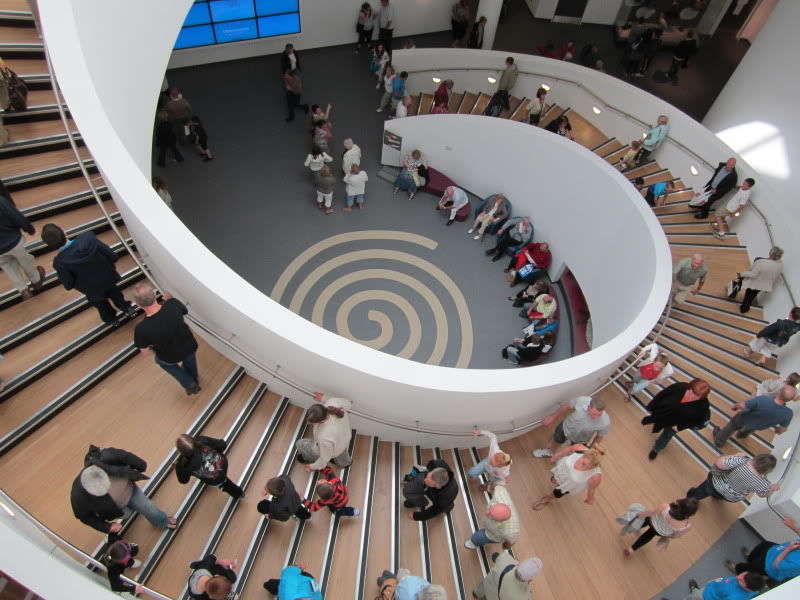
The centrally located spiral staircase within the museum

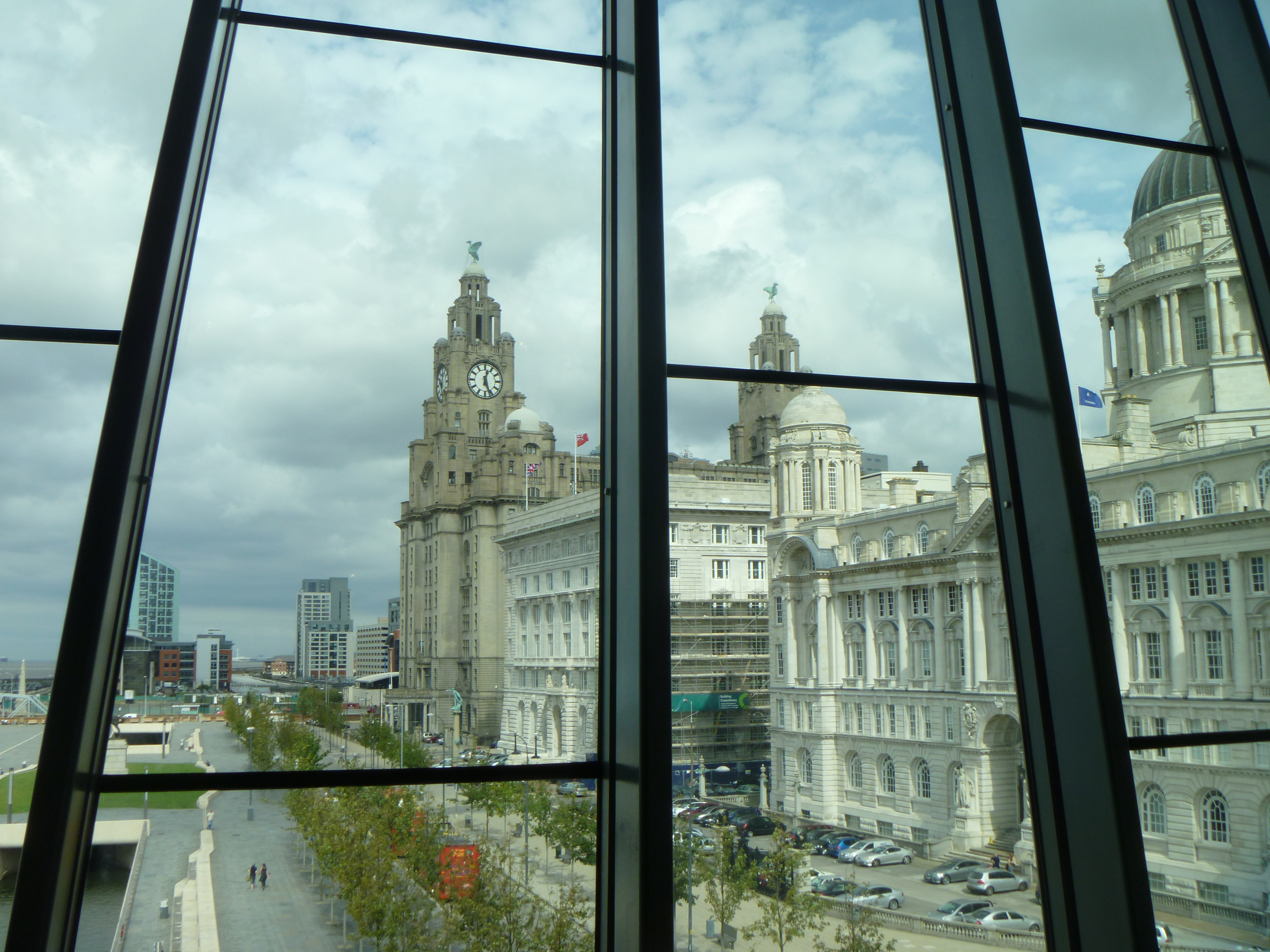
A view of Pier Head from The People's Republic gallery

The museum displays are divided into four main themes: The Great Port, Global City, People's Republic, and Wondrous Place, located in four large gallery spaces. On the ground floor, displays look at the city's urban and technological evolution, both local and national, including the Industrial Revolution and the changes in the British Empire, and how these changes have impacted the city's economic development. The upper floor looks at Liverpool's particular and strong identity through examining the social history of the city, from settlement in the area from Neolithic times to the present day, migration, and the various communities and cultures which contribute to the city's diversity.

The museum also features: Little Liverpool, a gallery for children under six; History Detectives, an interactive archaeology and history resource centre; a 180-seat theatre for community and audio-visual performances and meeting facilities. It also has a gallery called "City Soldiers" which tells the story of the King's Regiment. In February 2007, while the museum was under construction, steam locomotive Lion, star of the film The Titfield Thunderbolt, was moved by road from Manchester where it had been on loan, to Liverpool and eventually placed in the new museum.

== Exhibitions ==
Exhibits from the entirety of National Museums Liverpool's collections are used for the Museum of Liverpool's displays. They tell the story of the city through items from collections of costume and decorative art, entomological and botanical collections and objects representing social and urban history, as well as oral testimonies, archaeological material and photographic archives. From September to November 2012 the museum staged the Liverpool Love exhibition, in which well known personalities such as Yoko Ono, Sir Peter Blake and Noel Fielding celebrated the city of Liverpool.
