= Museum of Liverpool Life =

Former museum in Liverpool, England, superseded by the Museum of Liverpool

Coordinates: 53.402196°N 2.995255°W

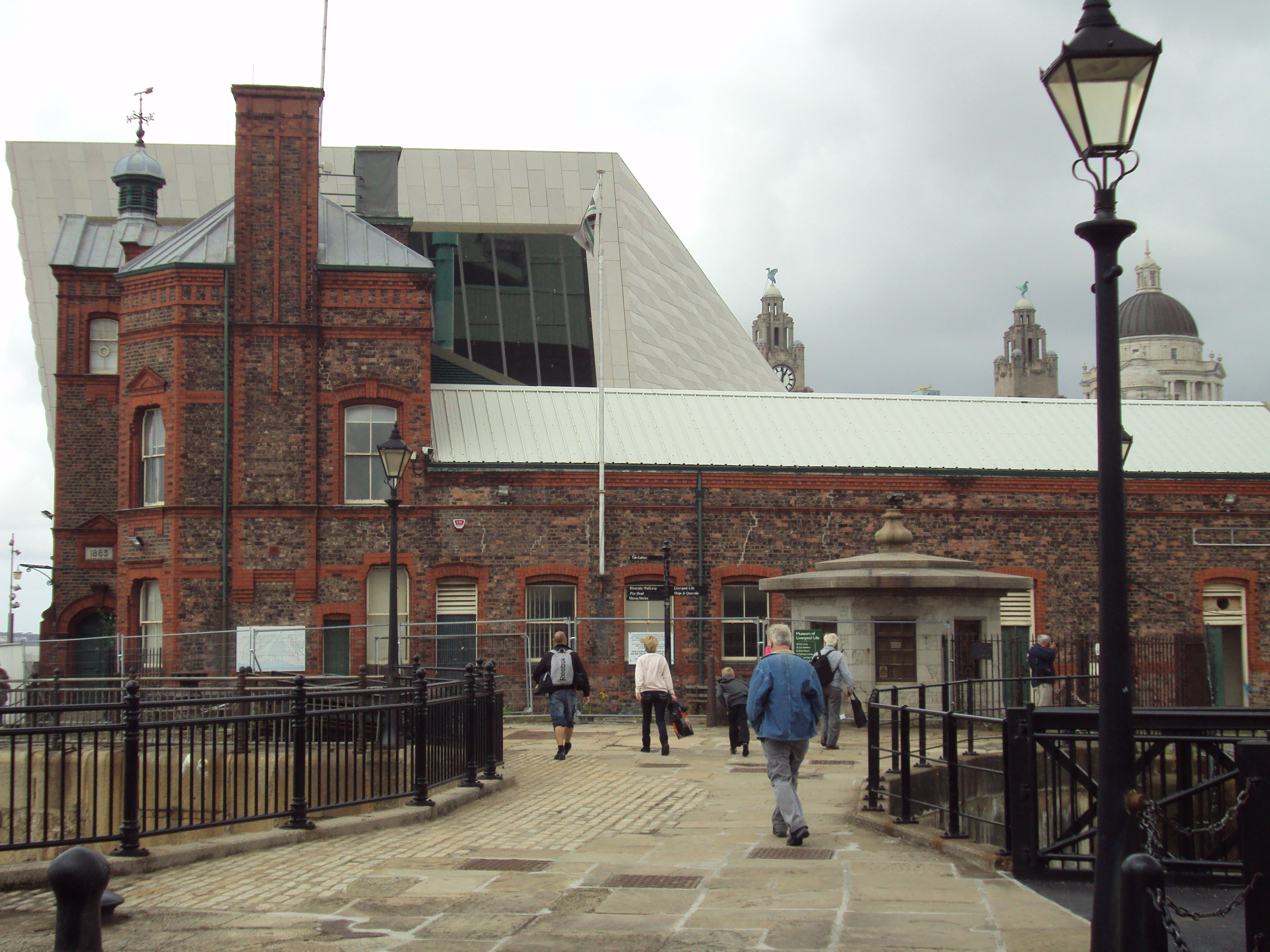
Museum of Liverpool Life

The Museum of Liverpool Life was a museum in Liverpool, England, part of National Museums Liverpool, that focused on the people of Liverpool. Due to increasing patronage and collection size, the museum closed in 2006 to prepare for construction of a larger site, the Museum of Liverpool, which opened in 2011.

== Exhibitions ==
At the time of its closure on 4 June 2006, the museum had three galleries: City Lives explored Liverpool's cultural diversity, The River Room described life alongside the River Mersey and City Soldiers was an exhibition about the King's Regiment. Previous exhibitions had included Mersey Culture, from Brookside to the Grand National, Making a Living and Demanding a Voice.
