= Port of Liverpool Building =

Listed building in Liverpool, England

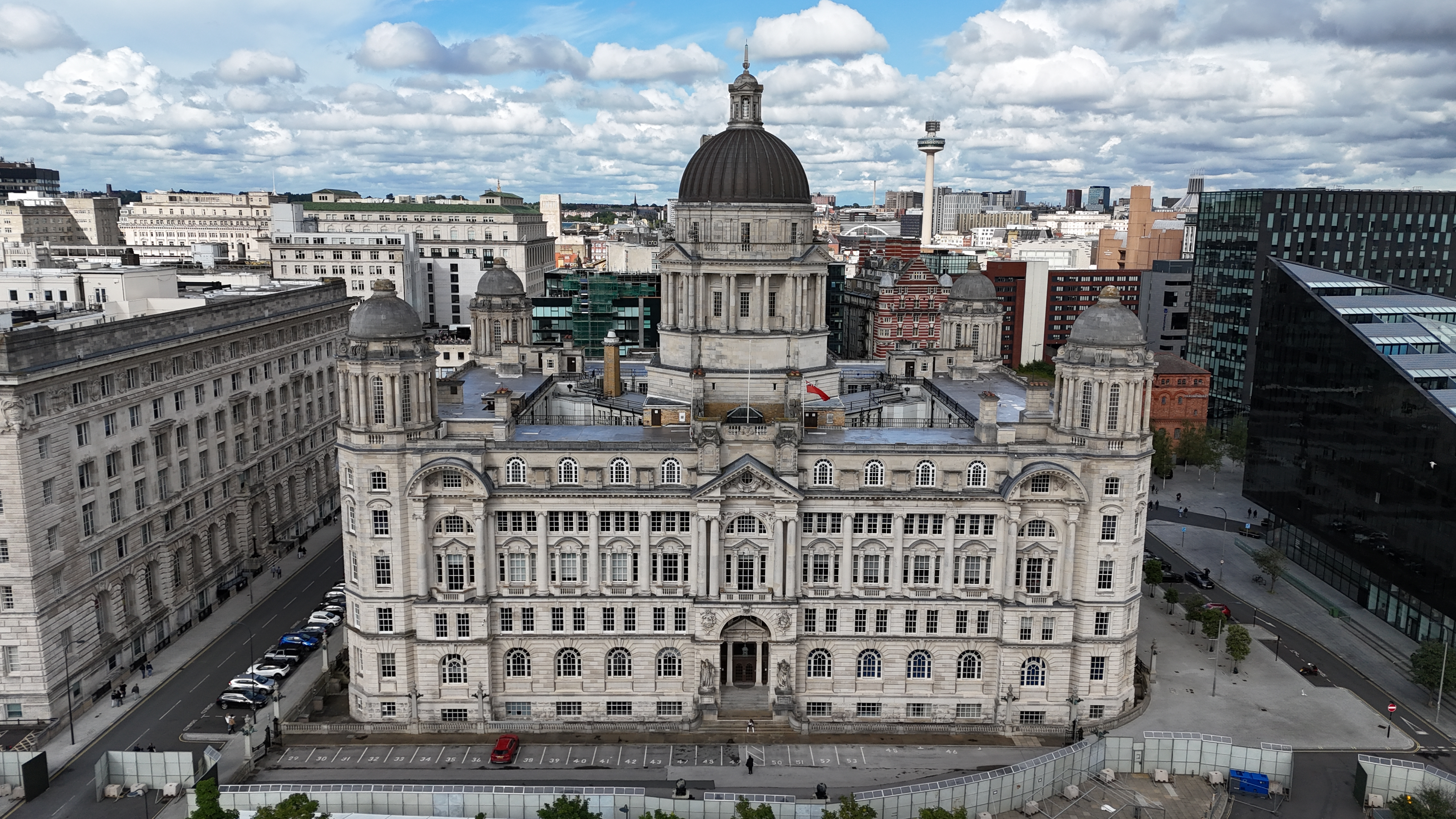

- Location within Liverpool
- Former names: Mersey Docks and Harbour Board Building

General information
- Type: Office Building
- Architectural style: Edwardian Baroque
- Location: (United Kingdom) Pier Head, Liverpool, England
- Coordinates: 53.4043°N 2.9949°W
- Current tenants: Multiple tenants including Rathbones, DHL and Hapag Lloyd
- Construction started: 1903
- Completed: 1907
- Cost: £250,000
- Owner: Downing

Height
- Height: 220 feet (67 m)

Technical details
- Structural system: Reinforced concrete with Portland stone cladding

Design and construction
- Architects: Sir Arnold Thornely, F.B. Hobbs, Briggs and Wolstenholme
- Main contractor: William Brown & Son
- Designations

Listed Building – Grade II*
- Official name: Port of Liverpool Building and stone balustrade, iron gates and piers
- Designated: 12 July 1966
- Reference no.: 1068223

Website
- portofliverpoolbuilding.com

The Port of Liverpool Building (formerly Mersey Docks and Harbour Board Offices, more commonly known as the Dock Office) is a Grade II* listed building in Liverpool, England. It is located at the Pier Head and, along with the neighbouring Royal Liver Building and Cunard Building, is one of Liverpool's Three Graces, which line the city's waterfront. It was part of Liverpool's UNESCO-designated World Heritage Maritime Mercantile City.

The building was designed by Sir Arnold Thornely and F.B. Hobbs and was developed in collaboration with Briggs and Wolstenholme. It was constructed between 1904 and 1907, with a reinforced concrete frame that is clad in Portland stone. The building was the headquarters of the Mersey Docks and Harbour Board (MDHB) for 87 years, from 1907 to 1994, when the company relocated to new premises at Seaforth Dock. In 2001 it was sold to Downing, a Liverpool-based property developer, and between 2006 and 2009 underwent a major £10m restoration that restored many original features of the building.

The Port of Liverpool Building is in the Edwardian Baroque style and is noted for the large dome that sits atop it, acting as the focal point of the building. It is approximately rectangular in shape with canted corners that are topped with stone cupolas. At 220 feet (67 m) the building was the tallest building in Liverpool when built, and as of 2025 is the sixteenth tallest. Like the neighbouring Cunard Building, it is noted for the ornamental detail both on the inside and out, and in particular for the many maritime references and expensive decorative furnishings.

== History ==
In 1898 the Mersey Docks and Harbour Board (MDHB) decided to close down and infill George's Dock, which was located on the site of what is the Pier Head today. The land was sold to the Liverpool Corporation in 1900, although the MDHB opted to keep the southern section so that they could build a new central headquarters for the company, having been previously located at various sites around the city, including the Old Customs House.

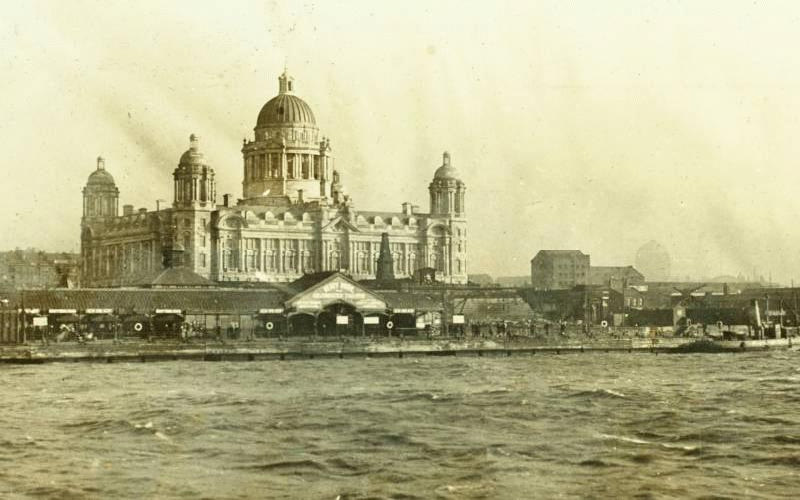
A view from the River Mersey from before 1914, showing a gap on the left, where the Cunard Building is now located

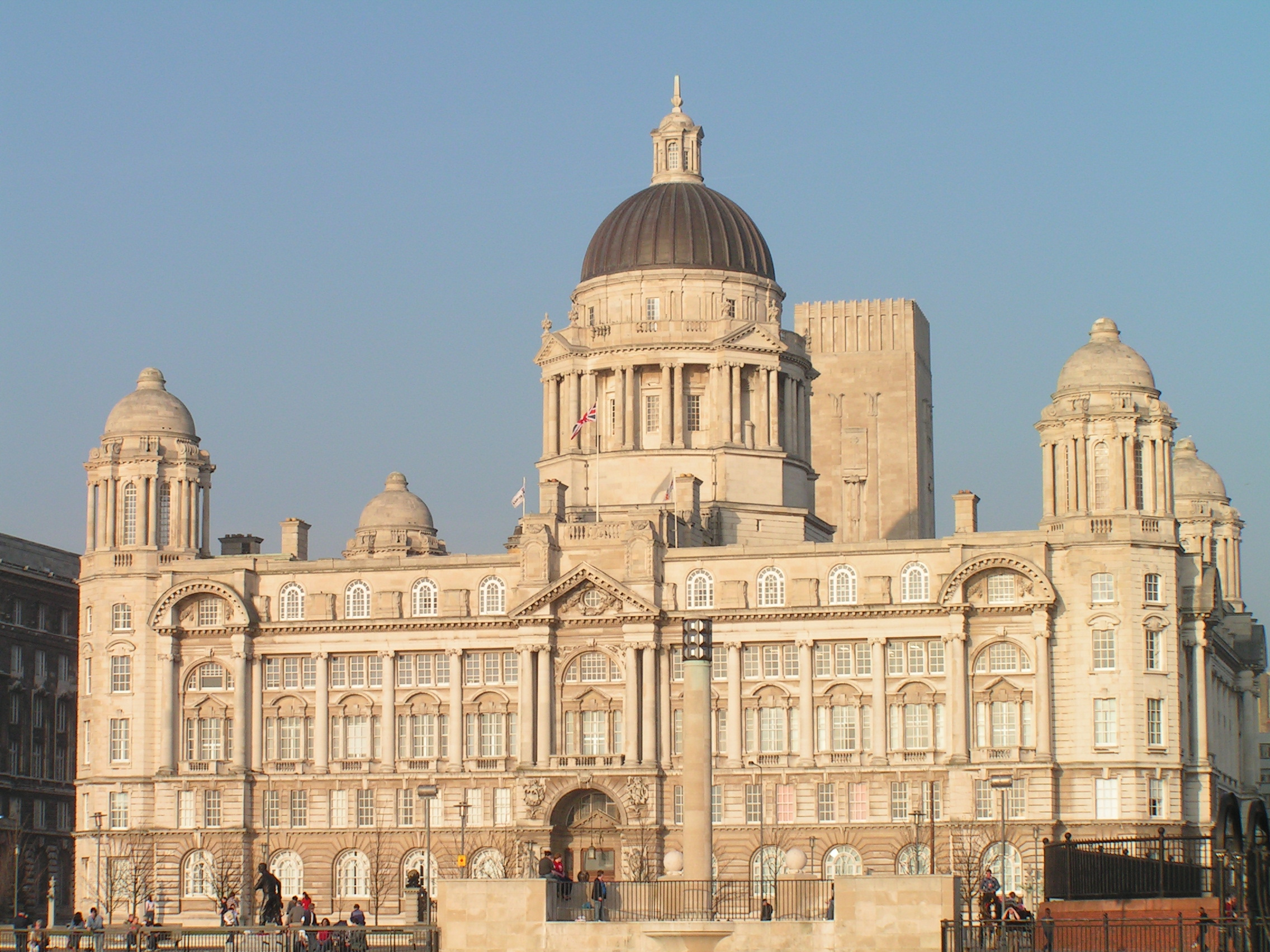
The Port of Liverpool Building

In 1900 a committee was formed by the MDHB to plan and develop a new building for the company. Under the leadership of Robert Gladstone, a competition was launched for local architects to submit designs for the new building. Alfred Waterhouse, a renowned local architect, was brought in to help judge the competition and prizes of £300, £200 and £100 were offered for the three best designs. In total, seven entries were submitted, with the winning design being that of the architects Sir Arnold Thornely and F.B. Hobbs, which had been developed in collaboration with Briggs and Wolstenholme. Due to boundary changes of the land on which the building was to be built, amendments were made to the design, most notably with the central dome, which was only added at the last minute.

In 1903 with the design now confirmed, the MDHB requested that a number of builders submit a tender document for the construction of the building to the revised design. Over 30 builders were contacted, with William Brown & Son of Manchester winning the contract to construct the new building. Work began in 1904, with the first nine months of construction focusing on laying the building's foundations, which were dug to a depth of 30–40 feet (9.1–12.2 m) below ground level. The building's frame was built from reinforced concrete, which was then clad in Portland stone, a design that meant the building was more fire resistant than with other structural forms. It was completed in 1907 at a cost of approximately £250,000, although when the cost of furniture, fittings and professional fees was taken into account, the total cost was nearer £350,000. Staff from the MDHB headquarters officially moved into the building on 15 July 1907, with staff from departments located in other areas of the city moving in throughout the rest of the year.

During World War II, Liverpool's importance as a major port saw it become a target for the Luftwaffe and during the May Blitz of 1941, a heavy bomb exploded in the basement, on the eastern side of the building. The damage from the explosion was significant with the eastern wing being seriously damaged by fire. Nonetheless, the building's structural integrity meant that much of the building could be re-occupied with only temporary repairs. In the aftermath of the war the building was fully restored; the cost of restoration exceeding the original construction costs.

The building acted as the head offices of the MDHB (renamed the Mersey Docks and Harbour Company in 1972) for some 87 years. In 1994 the company moved to new headquarters at the Maritime Centre near Seaforth Dock in the north of the city, in order to be closer to what was now the centre of Liverpool's docking system. However, the company remained the owners of the building until 2001 when it was acquired by Downing, a Liverpool-based property developer.

Plans submitted in 2005 for the restoration of the building were approved by Liverpool City Council. The scheme involved major internal and external work that would fully restore the Grade II* listed building. The plans included opening the building to the public, by creating a new viewing floor inside the dome and a publicly accessible sunken piazza on the riverside frontage that would provide a small parade of restaurants, cafes and shops. A sixth level of the building, which had been "dismantled" in the aftermath of World War II, was also to be restored, providing a series of luxury apartments. The first stage of the renovation was completed in early 2008, when the restoration of the Portland stone on the river facing side of the building was completed. The £10m restoration project was fully completed in early 2009, when the last scaffolding was removed from the outside of the building and 20,000 sq ft (2,000 m^{2}) of refurbished office space was completed.

== Architectural design ==
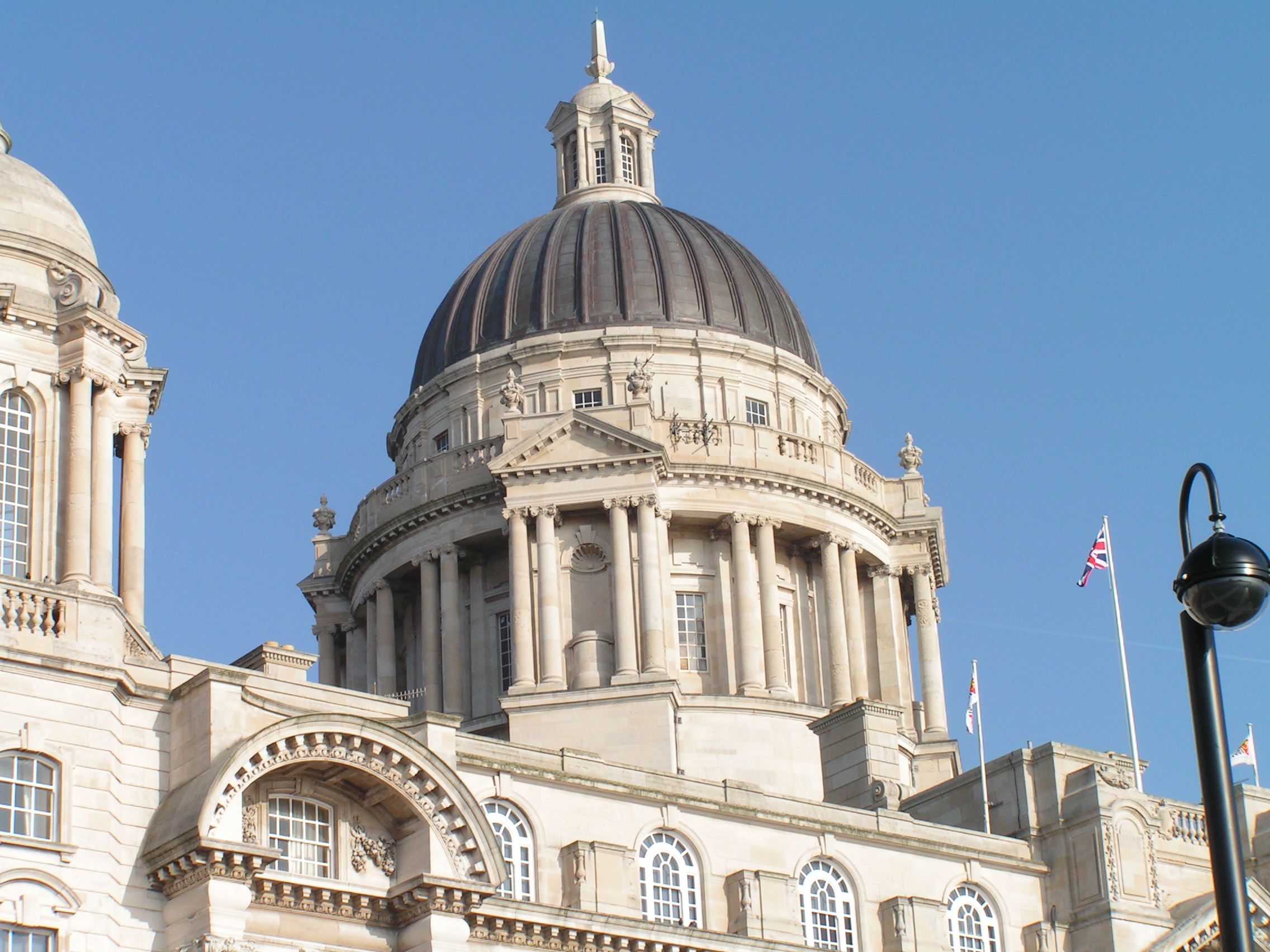
The building's central dome is the main focal point of the building, although it was not part of the original design

The Port of Liverpool Building is the oldest of the three large Pier Head buildings and the architectural features were designed to be reflective of Liverpool's importance to the maintenance of the British Empire. However, the building that exists today is actually a modified version of the originally chosen design. Initially, the plan had called for the main entrance of the building to be located on the south-west corner, but boundary changes to land on which it was to be built meant that the design was significantly revised to give it the symmetrical look it has today. Notably, the initial design did not include the large dome that sits so prominently above the building today. Inspired by an unused design for Liverpool's Anglican Cathedral, which had been developed several years earlier, the architects added the dome to the design in order to give the building a more imposing look. This decision, however, was not without controversy, as many board members believed that it was not part of the Port Authority's duty to "beautify the town". Nonetheless, it was added to the design, becoming the focal point of the building itself.

Designed in Edwardian Baroque style, the Port of Liverpool Building's structural form has been likened to those of Renaissance palaces. Approximately 264 by 216 feet (80 by 66 m) in size, the building rises to 220 feet (67 m) in height, making it the fourteenth tallest building in the city. Covering five floors, the main body of the building is 80 ft tall to the cornice. The main entrance is located in the centre of the river-facing side of the building and is flanked by two three-metre-high stone statues of women representing "Commerce" and "Industry", which were designed by Charles John Allen. Each corner of the building is canted and has a tall hexagonal turret that is topped by a stone cupola, which would have originally been crowned by a lantern. Because the building has a large central dome, it has been compared architecturally to many other buildings throughout the world, including Belfast City Hall, the Capitol Building, St. Peter's Basilica and St. Paul's Cathedral.

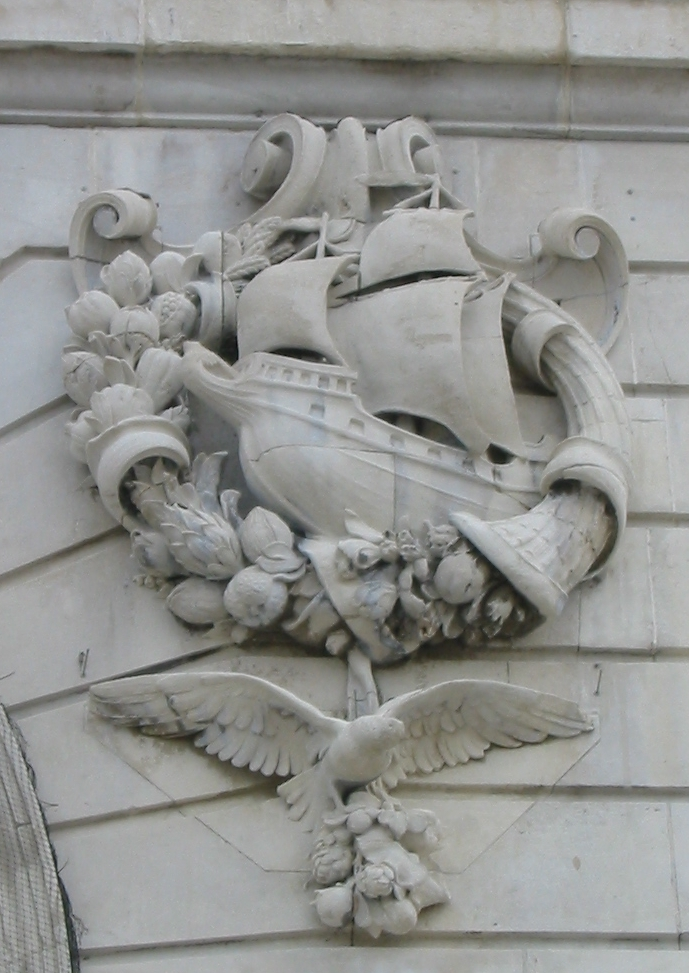
Maritime references are a common feature in the building's decoration

The Port of Liverpool Building was constructed using a reinforced concrete frame, which not only made the building structurally strong, but also much more fire resistant than buildings in the past. As a result of being built on the site of the former George's Dock, the building required deeper foundations than normal and in total some 35,000 tons of concrete were used. Due to the building's proximity to the River Mersey, extensive work was carried out during the development of the basement level in order to make sure it was water resistant. Asphalt was used extensively to coat the floors and walls of the basement, in order to make sure it stayed dry.

Internally, the building's form centres on a full-height, octagonal hall that sits below the central dome. The hall has round, arched openings from the first floor upwards, providing large gallery spaces, whilst its floor is decorated with a mosaic depicting the points of a compass. Office spaces are located off long central corridors, which are decorated with white Calacatta Marble. A large portion of the building costs (approximately 25%) were spent on decorations and fittings; the inside of the building is lavishly decorated using expensive materials including mahogany from Spain and oak from Gdańsk (Danzig) for the woodwork, bronze for the floor furniture and fittings, and white marble for the floors and walls. One noted interior feature is the grey granite grand staircase, which is lined with stained glass windows adorned with images of Poseidon, anchors, ships bells and shells and dedications to countries of the British Empire including Singapore, South Africa, Canada and Australia. The grand nature of the inside of the building's interior has meant that it has been used as a film set in several productions, including The Adventures of Sherlock Holmes. episode "The Blue Carbuncle"

Throughout the building, there are numerous references to the sea and the maritime operations of both Liverpool and the British Empire. The main entrance gates are decorated with a globe supported by dolphins, while the cast iron gates and gate piers are decorated with mermaids, shells and anchors, and have shields with the initials "M.D. & H.B." (Mersey Docks & Harbour Board).

The outside light fittings are designed such that the lights themselves appear to be held in the hands of the Roman God Neptune. Similarly, the lifts are also decorated with maritime references, in the form of gilded emblems representing the globe, seahorses and anchors. In the central hall, the frieze between the ground and first floor is adorned with the words of psalm 107: "They that go down to the sea in ships that do business in great waters these see the works of the Lord and his wonders in the deep. Anno Domini MCMVII" (1907).

== See also ==
- Architecture of Liverpool
- Grade II* listed buildings in Liverpool – City Centre

Records
Preceded by Welsh Presbyterian Church	Tallest Building in Liverpool; 1907 – 1911	Succeeded by Royal Liver Building
