= Liverpool Marathon =

Road running event in Liverpool, England

- Liverpool Marathon Logo
- Date: October
- Location: Liverpool, England
- Event type: Road
- Distance: Marathon
- Website: runliverpoolmarathon.co.uk

The Liverpool Marathon was a road race held in Liverpool, England, and its neighbouring borough Wirral founded 2011. It was seen as the successor to the Mersey Marathon which last took place in 1992.

The inaugural event in 2011 was estimated to involve 12,000 participants.

== The course ==
Course

The course began on the Western side of the River Mersey in the Joseph Paxton-designed Birkenhead Park, the course heads north to New Brighton, a former seaside resort before returning to Birkenhead and heading through Queensway Tunnel linking Birkenhead to Liverpool.

On the Liverpool side of the river, the tunnel exit bypasses the city centre and runs alongside the Liver Building, Cunard Building, Liverpool One shopping centre, Albert Dock, Kings Dock Arena before passing the Liverpool Anglican Cathedral. The course runs through Princes Park and Sefton Park and before returning to the finish line at the Pier Head in front of the Port of Liverpool Building.
