= Robert Barrow =

Robert Barrow may refer to:

- Robert Irving Barrow (1805–c. 1890), British artist and architectural illustrator
- Robert H. Barrow (1922–2008), United States Marine Corps general
- Robert Ruffin Barrow (1798–1875), American slave-owner
