= Kathryn Morrison =

Kathryn Morrison may refer to:

- Kathryn Morrison (model) (born 1955), American model
- Kathryn Morrison (politician) (1942–2013), Wisconsin legislator
- Kathryn A. Morrison (born 1959), British historian
