= R. J. Barrow =

R. J. Barrow may refer to:

- Robert Irving Barrow (1805-circa 1890), artist and architectural illustrator
- Rosemary Barrow (1968–2016), art historian
