= Liver bird =

Mythical bird which is the symbol of Liverpool

The liver bird

The liver bird (/ˈlaɪvərbɜːrd/ LY-vər-burd) is a mythical creature that is the symbol of the English city of Liverpool. It is normally represented as a cormorant, and appears as such on the city's arms, in which it bears a branch of laver seaweed in its beak as a further pun on the name "Liverpool".

== History ==
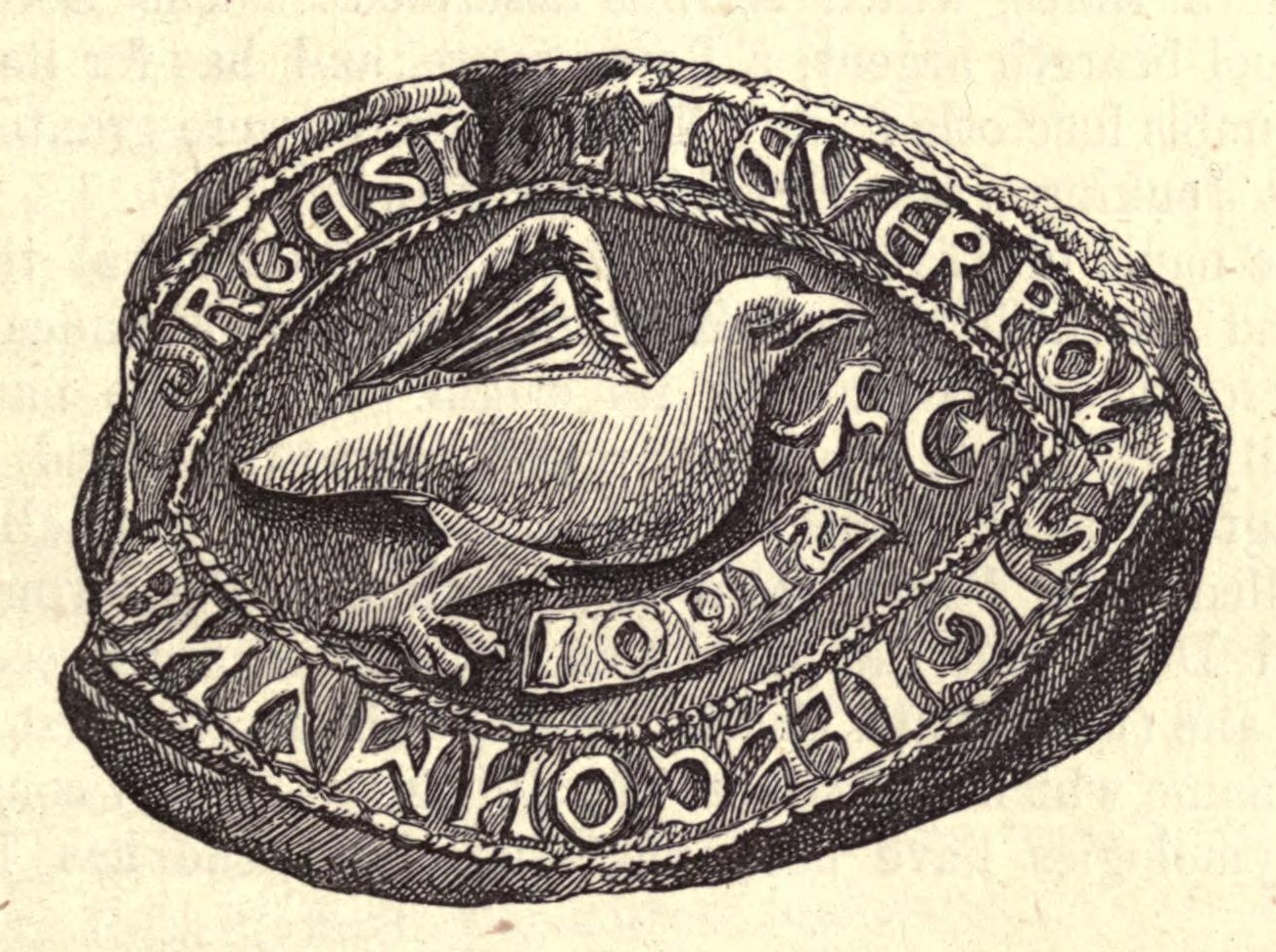
13th-century seal of Liverpool (lost in the English Civil War)

King John founded the borough of Liverpool by royal charter in 1207. The borough's second charter, granted by Henry III in 1229, gave the townspeople the right to form a guild with the privileges this came with, including the right to use a common seal. Liverpool's ancient seal probably dated from this time, though the earliest surviving impression (kept in the British Museum) is from 1352. The seal depicted a generic bird with a plant sprig in its beak, together with a scroll inscribed (in shaky letters) "JOHIS" - an abbreviation for Johannis, Latin for "John's". The bird was almost certainly intended to be an eagle, the symbol of John the Evangelist, who was both the namesake and the patron saint of King John. The plant sprig is interpreted as broom (planta genista in Latin), a badge of the Plantagenet dynasty. Also visible on the seal is a star and crescent, one of King John's personal badges.

The coat of arms of Liverpool, granted in 1797

The shoddy draughtsmanship of the seal has given rise to other theories. Richard Brooke, a 19th-century Liverpudlian antiquary, surmised that the bird was a dove with an olive branch, and that the scroll read "NOBIS" or "VOBIS".

By the 17th century the bird's real identity had been forgotten: it began to be interpreted either as a cormorant, a common bird in the area, or as a "lever". In 1611 the municipal records describe the mayor receiving a plate "marked with the Cormorant, the Townes Armes", while in 1668 the Earl of Derby gifted the town a silver-gilt mace engraved with a "leaver". In his 1688 work The Academie of Armorie, Randle Holme records the arms of Liverpool as a blue "lever" upon a silver field. Holme takes this word to be an adaptation of the German loffler or Dutch lepler, both referring to the spoonbill. It is possible that these continental words were adopted for the bird in Liverpool's arms as they made a fitting allusion to the name "Liverpool". Around the same time the broom sprig in the bird's beak was reinterpreted as a branch of laver, also on account of the similarity of the word to the city's name.

In August 1796 Mayor Clayton Tarleton wrote to the College of Arms to request an official grant of arms to the city. His letter called the bird "a lever or sea cormorant". Arms were duly granted on 22 March 1797 by Sir Isaac Heard, Garter King of Arms, and George Harrison, Norroy King of Arms; however the grant described the bird only as a "cormorant".

In addition to the arms and crest, Garter granted supporters on 23 March. These consist of Neptune, the god of the sea, and his son and herald Triton. The motto is Deus nobis haec otia fecit—a quotation from Virgil's Eclogues translating to "God hath granted us this ease" or "God has bestowed these blessings upon us".

== Representations in the city ==
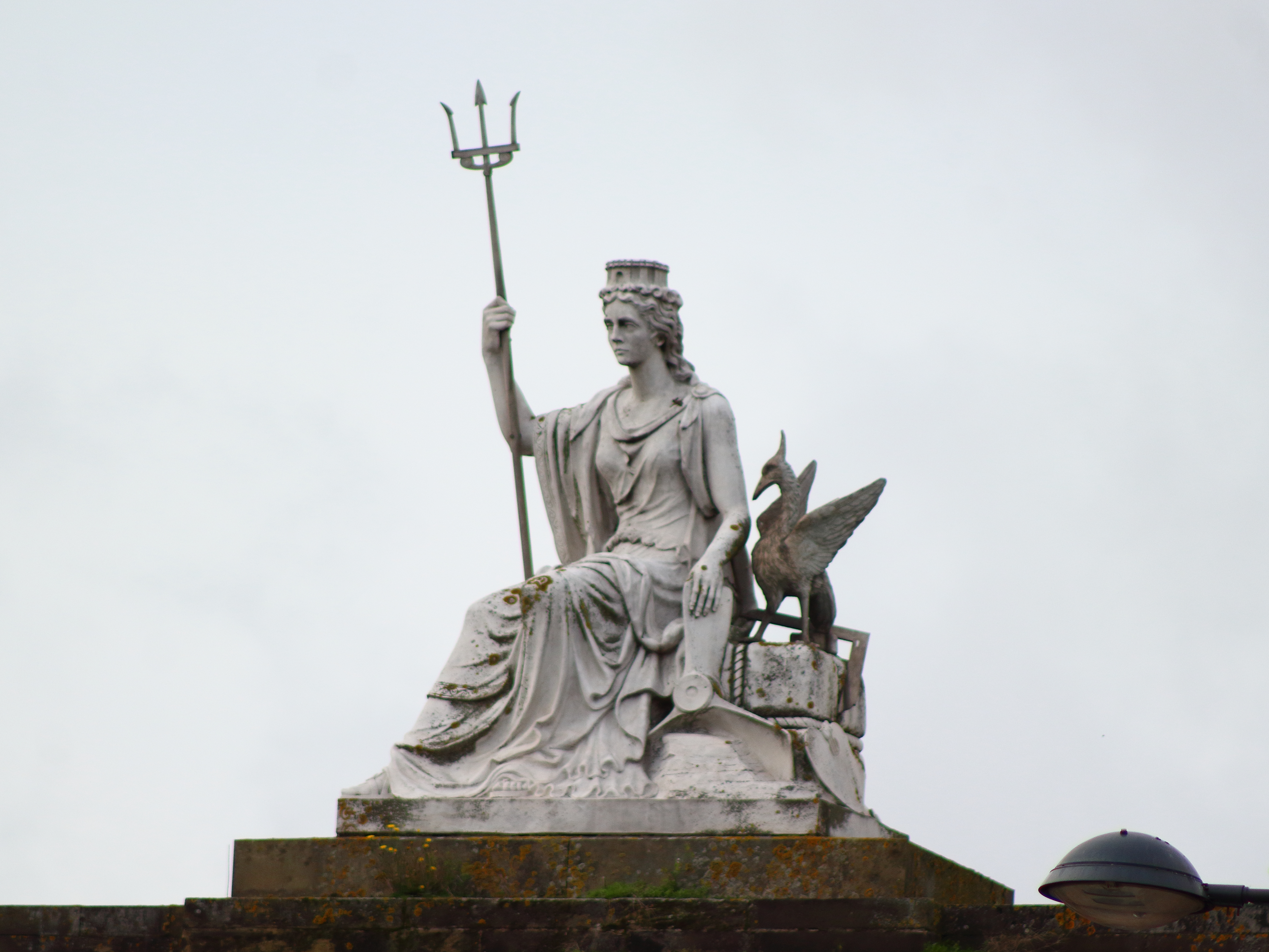
The Spirit of Liverpool sculpture above the Walker Art Gallery

Representations of the bird can be found throughout Liverpool, most numerously on the heritage lamp standards in the town centre on which small versions sit as a top piece. The two most famous stand atop the clock towers of the Royal Liver Building at Liverpool's Pier Head, overlooking the Mersey. They stand at 18 ft tall with a wingspan of 24 ft. The building, headquarters to the Royal Liver Assurance, was opened in 1911. The metal cormorant-like birds were designed by Carl Bernard Bartels and constructed by the Bromsgrove Guild of Applied Arts.

There are other less well-known liver birds in the city. A metal bird is on the nearby Mersey Chambers office building, adjacent to the Church of Our Lady and St Nicholas, the parish church of the city of Liverpool. Another, a bird carved in stone, topped the St. John's Market building of 1822 until its demolition in 1964. The stone liver bird is now displayed at the Museum of Liverpool. In 2014, it was announced that a 6ft statue would be placed in the entrance to Liverpool Central station in memory of Paul Rice, former chief executive of Liverpool's Commercial District Partnership.

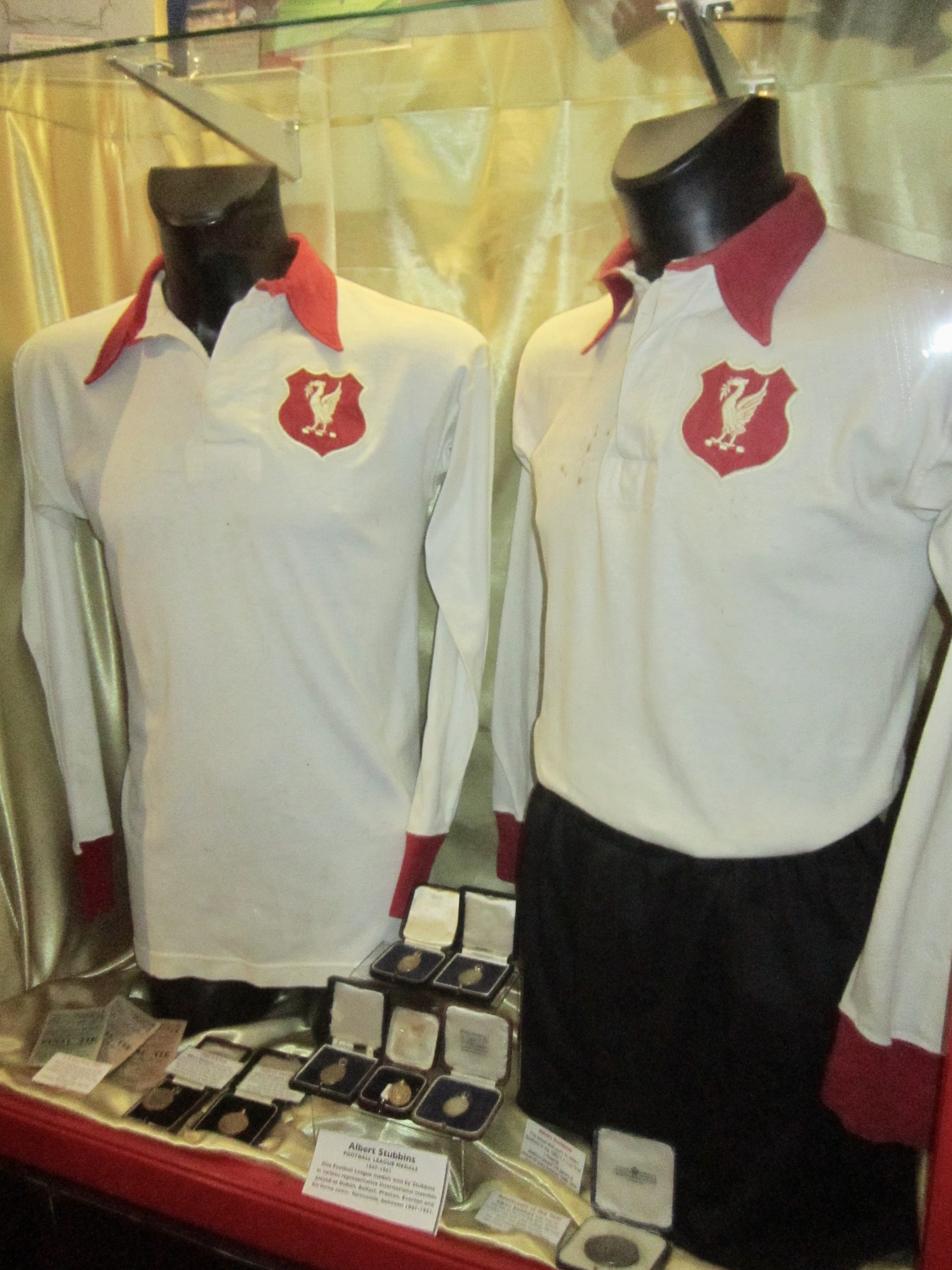
Liverpool F.C. shirts from the 1950 FA Cup final in the club museum

The liver bird appears on the official club crest of Liverpool F.C. having first appeared in a flag over Anfield in September 1892 two weeks after the club's first competitive match, and from the turn of the century it appeared on official club correspondence, club programmes, players track-suit tops from the 1930s before it first appeared on the club's white away shirts at the 1950 FA Cup final, and was then incorporated in the red home shirt in 1955. The first club to use it as a symbol was Everton, appearing in their league winners medals from 1891 as it also was for Liverpool when they won the league in 1901. Everton's first official badge was a white monogram of interwoven "EFC" letters on a blue shield, introduced around 1920, before Everton secretary Theo Kelly designed the club's crest featuring the Everton Lock-Up (Prince Rupert’s Tower) in 1938 which first appeared on the club's ties. In 2010, an Everton fan believed the liver bird should be reinstated to represent Everton, arguing that as a symbol of the whole city it rightfully belongs to both clubs, but Everton spokesman Ian Ross said: "I think even the most devout Evertonian knows that the Liver Bird is now synonymous with Liverpool FC". In 2012, Liverpool F.C. introduced a club mascot based on the liver bird emblem, named Mighty Red.

== Modern myths and popular culture ==
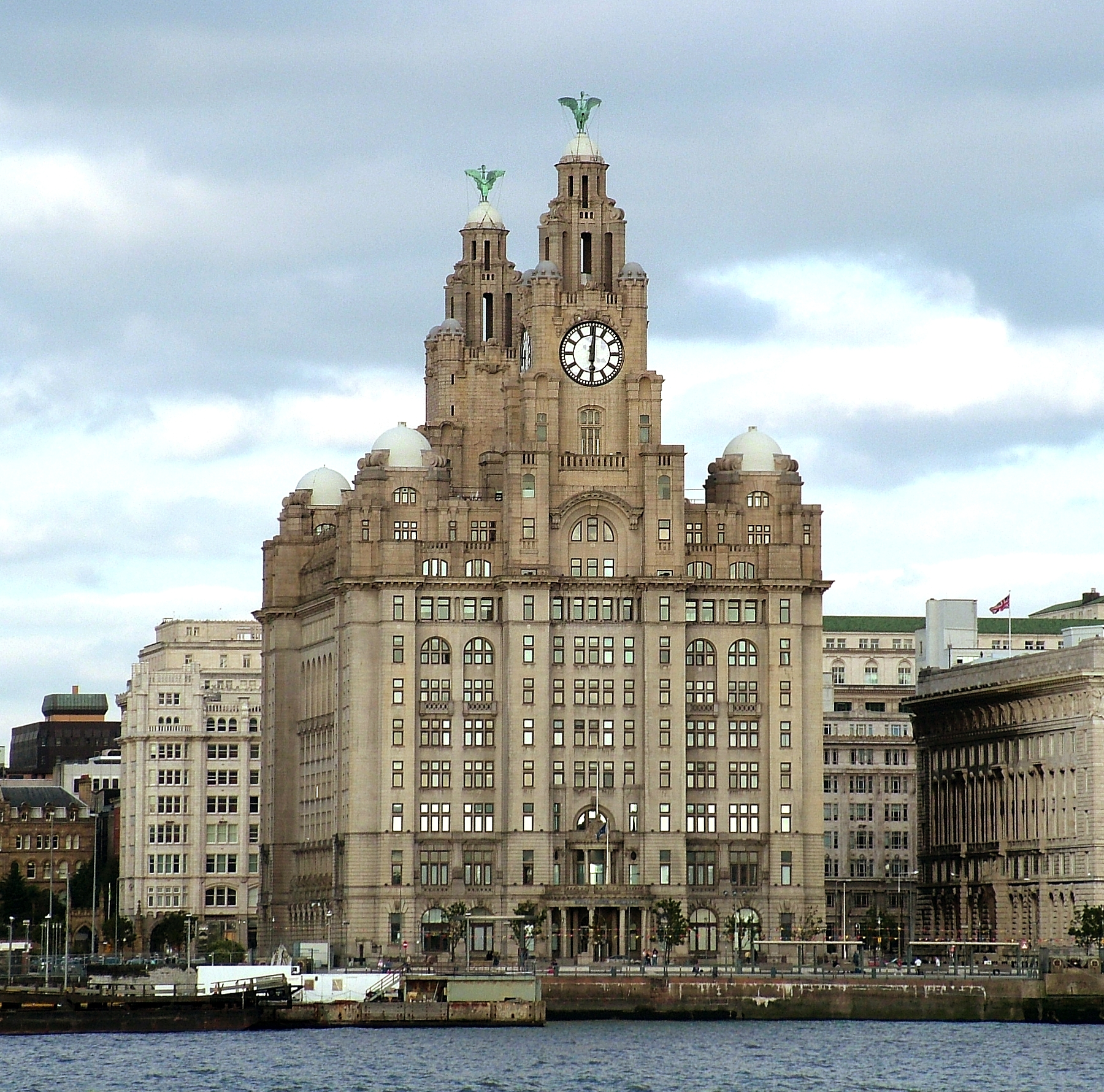
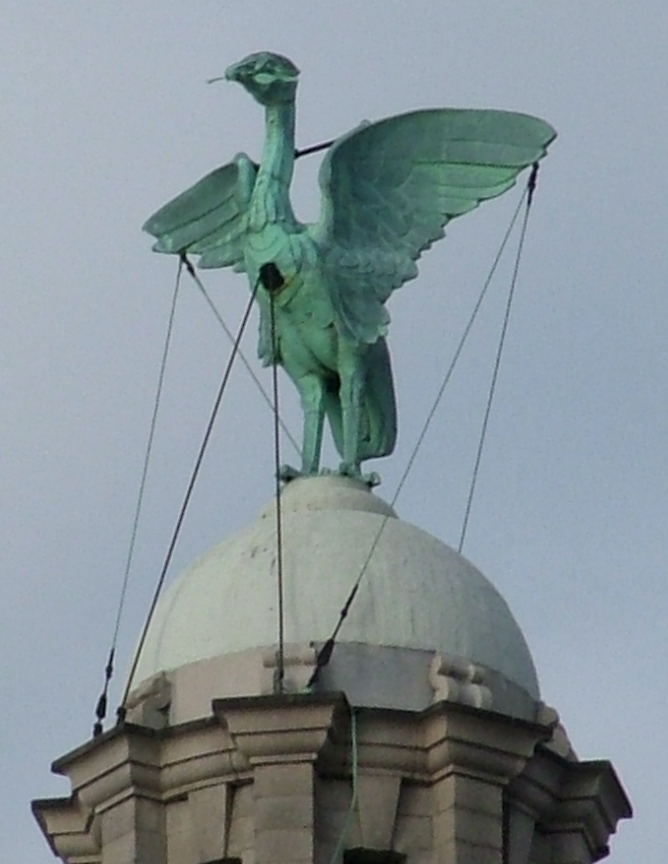
The Royal Liver Building, with a closeup of one of the liver birds

The modern popularity of the symbol largely dates to 1911, when the Liver Building was built. This prominent display of two liver birds rekindled the idea that the liver was a mythical bird that once haunted the local shoreline. According to popular legend, they are a male and female pair: the female looking out to sea, watching for the seamen to return safely home, and the male looking in to the city, watching over the seamen's families (or "making sure the pubs are open", as a jocular version has it). Local legend also holds that the birds face away from each other, for if they were to mate and fly away, the city would cease to exist.

Another popular story told about them is that they are chained down, for if they were to fly away the River Mersey would burst its banks and flood the city of Liverpool. This is somewhat similar to the mating story.

An all-female rock group from Liverpool called The Liverbirds were active in the 1960s. They moved to Hamburg in 1964, where they were billed as die weiblichen Beatles (the female Beatles).

The Liver Birds is a British sitcom originally broadcast in the 1970s, about two young women in Liverpool.

The crest of Sir Paul McCartney is a calling liver bird holding a guitar, in reference to his profession and native city.

In May 2026, a bronze Liver Bird statue was unveiled by University of Liverpool Chancellor Professor Simon Jones at the Taicang Entrepreneur College of Xi’an Jiaotong-Liverpool University, Suzhou, to mark 20 years of partnership between the Universities. The statue was created by Shanghai-based artist Ye Qing.

== Trademark ==
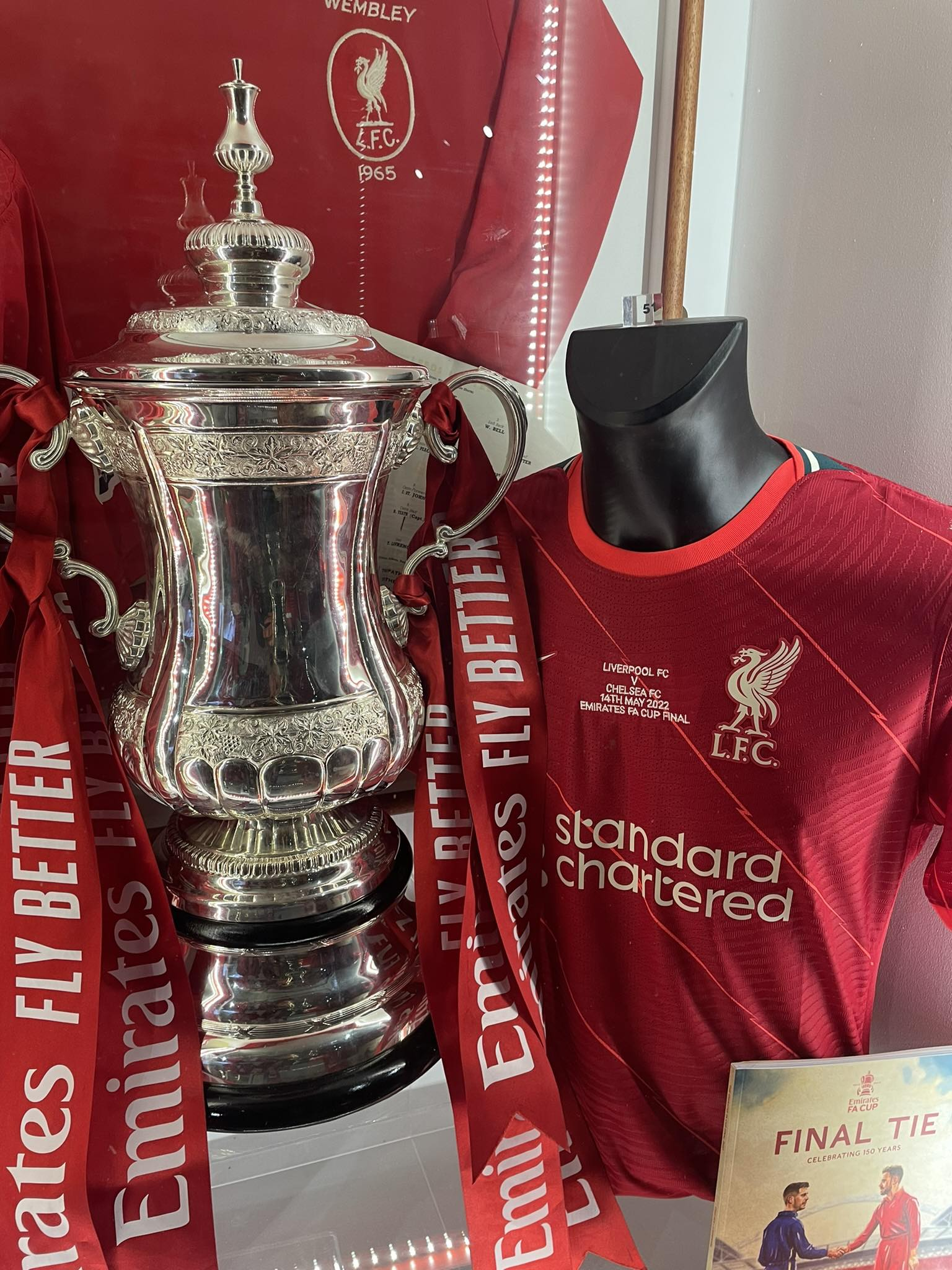
A liver bird on the crest of Liverpool F.C. shirts

In November 2008, Liverpool F.C. filed an application with the UK Intellectual Property Office to register the version of the liver bird shown on the club badge as its trademark. The deputy council leader, Flo Clucas, responded that "The Liver bird belongs to all the people of Liverpool and not one company or organisation."

Liverpool F.C. finally acquired a registration covering a trademark incorporating a liver bird in September 2010, after coming to an agreement with the city council. Liverpool F.C. obtained a trademark registration from the European trademark office and the council obtained its own registration from the UK IPO covering a trademark incorporating a liver bird. This was done to protect its use by companies in Liverpool, but also for the football club to protect itself against counterfeit products.
