= St John's Market =

St. John's Market
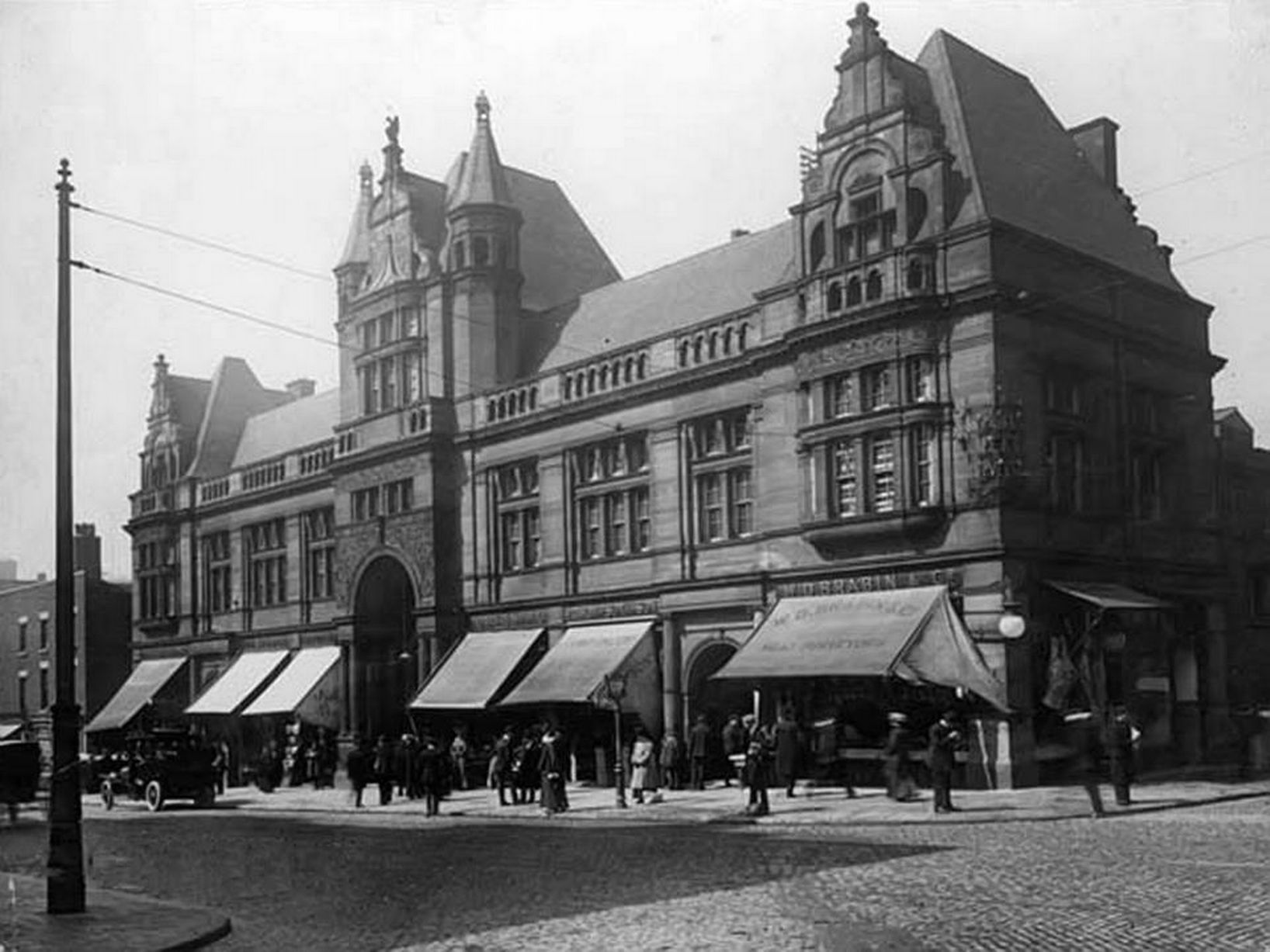
- The building's Elliot Street facade, rebuilt in 1891, photographed in the 1910s
- Interactive map of the St. John's Market area

General information
- Status: Demolished
- Type: Market hall
- Location: Great Charlotte Street, Liverpool, England
- Coordinates: 53.406588°N 2.981420°W
- Construction started: August 1820
- Completed: February 1822
- Opened: 7 March 1822
- Demolished: 1964

Dimensions
- Other dimensions: 549 foot (167 m) × 135 foot (41 m)

Design and construction
- Architect: John Foster, Junior

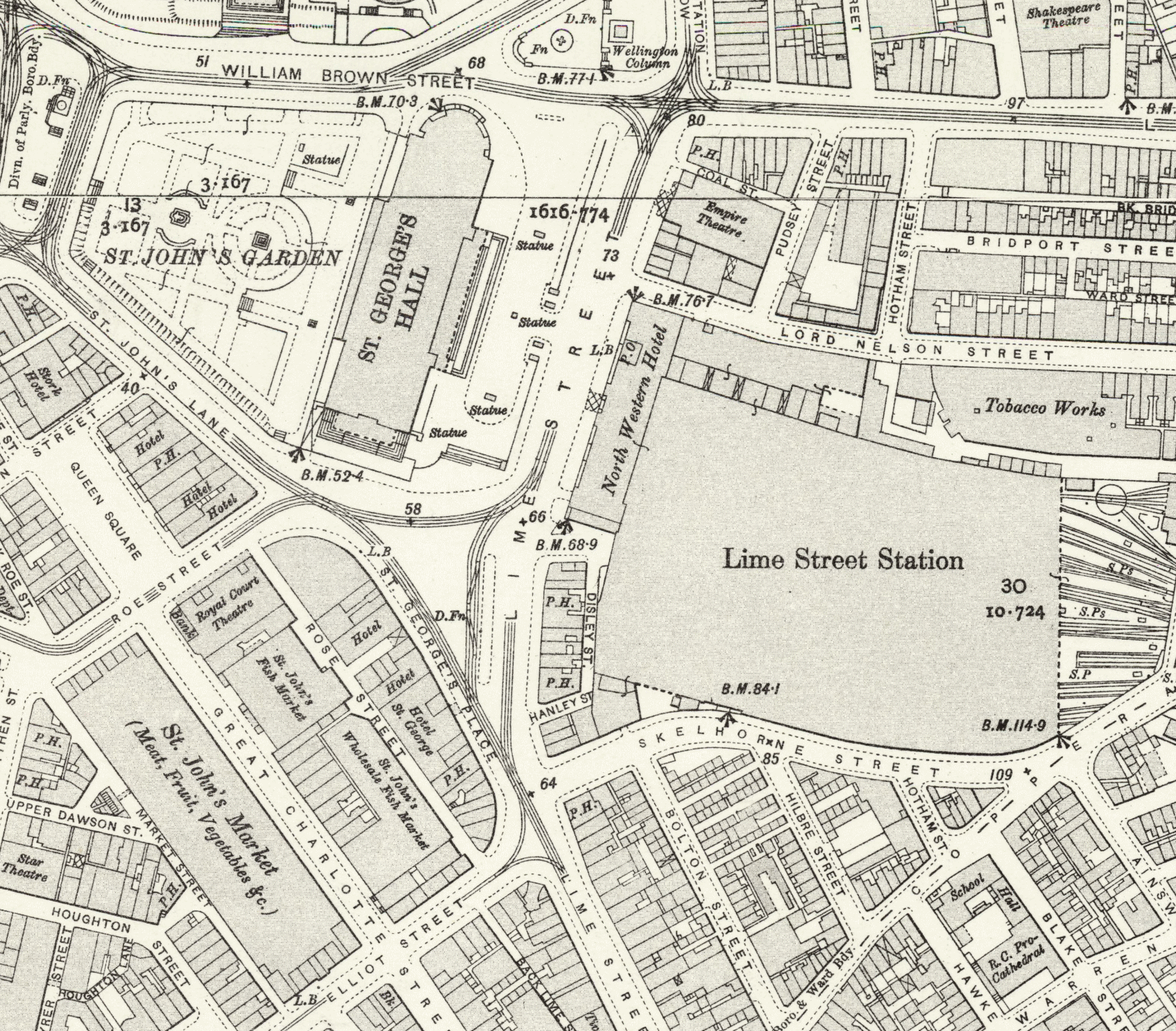
St. John's Market, at the bottom left of this map, shown in relation to St. John's Gardens, St George's Hall and Lime Street station

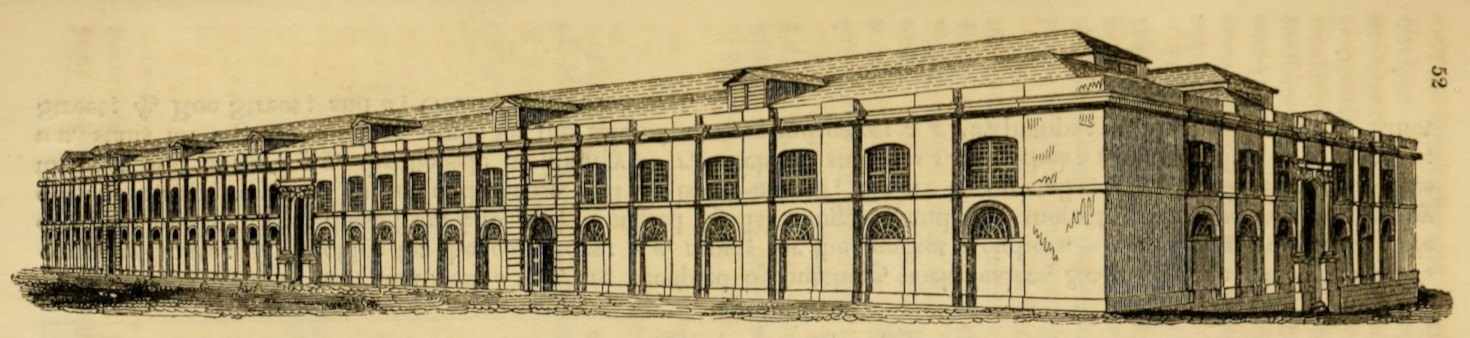
Exterior of St. John's Market, c.1835. The Roe Street facade was altered in 1881, and the Elliot Street facade was substantially rebuilt in 1891

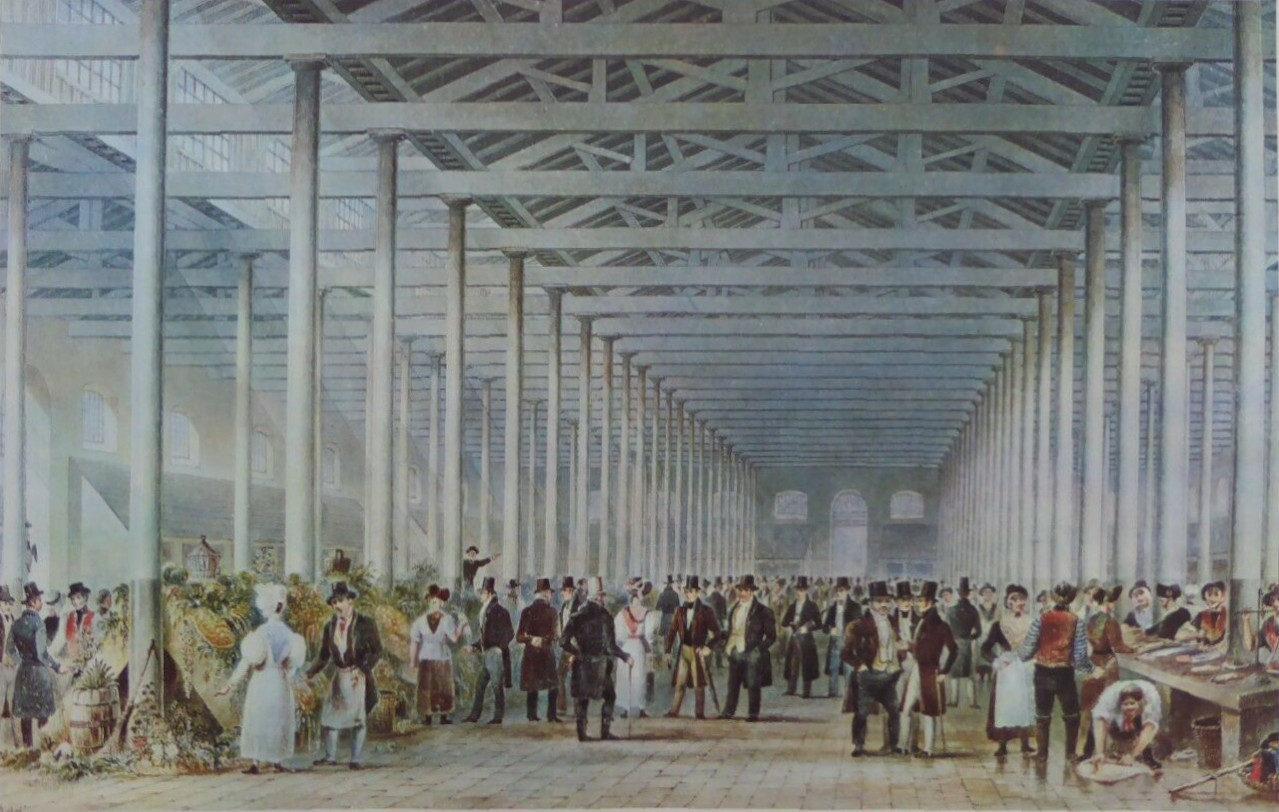
Interior of the market hall, 1828, by Robert Irving Barrow

St. John's Market was a municipal retail market hall in Liverpool, England, housed in a purpose-designed building erected between 1820 and 1822 to a design by John Foster, Junior. It quickly came to be seen as a model for market halls erected elsewhere in the UK in the 19th century. The north and south facades of the building were altered in 1881 and 1891; it was demolished in 1964, making way for the 1969 St Johns Shopping Centre, the western half of which occupies the hall's site.

== Background ==
Urban population increases in 18th and 19th century England and Wales due to industrialisation gave impetus to changes in the ownership and provision of physical marketplaces for the sale of foodstuffs and other products in towns and cities. More than 300 Acts of Parliament were passed between 1801 and 1880 allowing nascent local governments to acquire market rights from their manorial holders, and to fund the construction of market facilities. From about 1800, market halls emerged as the 'perfect form' of the marketplace, and town followed town in bringing their markets indoors into roofed buildings supplying amenities such as water, lighting and heating. St. John's Market, an early design on a grand scale, came to be taken as a model for other locations, including Birmingham Market Hall.

Market rights in Liverpool derived from a 1207 charter granted by King John; although long held by the Molyneux family, they were leased to Liverpool Corporation in 1672 for a period of 1000 years, and in 1773 transferred in perpetuity to the corporation. In the early 19th century prior to the new St John's Market, Liverpool's retail market was a street market centred on an open area around St. George's Church (closed 1897, the site now houses the Victoria Monument) at the south end of Castle Street; but, as Liverpool's population (Note: Liverpool's population grew from about 95,000 to 115,000 in the 1801-10 period (~26% ten-year increase) and to 154,000 by 1821 (~33% ten-year increase).) and thus demand grew, increasingly spilling out into adjacent roads and becoming a serious annoyance and obstruction to all business not immediately connected with it. Characteristic of a street market, it provided little protection against inclement weather, which became a subject of very general complaint.

The Corporation of Liverpool determined to remedy the observed problems by removing the market to a new location, protected from the weather and providing no obstruction to public thoroughfares. The town, expanding eastwards from the Mersey, the Corporation chose as the site for the proposed hall a former ropewalk one-third of a mile (540 metres) east of the existing market in an area named for St. John's Church (demolished 1898), on the west side of Great Charlotte Street and having Elliot Street to the south, Market Street to the west, and Roe Street to the north.

The structure was commenced in August 1820 and completed in February, 1822, to a design by John Foster, Junior, architect to the corporation, at a cost, exclusive of the land, of about £35,000. (Note: J.A.P. Architect, in The Architectural Magazine, specifies the cost of the St John's Market structure as 'about £35,000'. A 1903 Liverpool Corporation publication specifies the cost of the market as £48,503. The smaller sum explicitly excludes the cost of land and so the possibility is that the difference represents a land cost of £13,500.) The market was opened on Thursday, 7 March 1822.

== Design ==
The ground plan of the market hall is rectangular, 549 foot (167 m) in length, and 135 foot (41 m) in breadth, enclosing an area just short of 2 acres (0.81 ha) entirely covered. An 1835 reviewer commented that "this ... if not the very first, was one of the first markets in the kingdom, in which the principle of covering in the whole under one roof was attempted; at least on a scale of any considerable magnitude."

The roof was constructed in five divisions, two of which were raised considerably above the others, forming a clerestory, pierced with windows providing illumination and, swinging upon their centres, allowing air to circulate. The tie beams of the lower trusses were continued across the opening of the clerestories, from side to side of the building, binding the whole together; and, at the point of their intersection with the gutter beams, were supported by five rows of cast-iron columns, 116 in all, each 25 foot (7.6 m) in height. A total of 136 windows were provided in the upper and lower tiers of the roof.

The exterior was built with brick, in a plain and simple style of architecture. Piers were projected at regular intervals, round which the cornices and stringcourses break. Between these were inserted two tiers of windows, the lower semicircular, with stone architraves and imposts; the upper tier finished with segmental brick arches. The whole is raised on a stone plinth, under which, where the declivity of the ground admits of it, there is a rusticated stone basement. There were eight entrances, three on each side, and one at each end, the principal entrances faced with Italian Ionic columns on pedestals, with entablatures over, and semicircular-arched gateways.

The building had a stone finial in the form of a liver bird, now in the Museum of Liverpool. It was previously displayed in BBC Radio Merseyside's entrance foyer on Hanover Street, and at Merseyside Maritime Museum from 2007 until 2009.

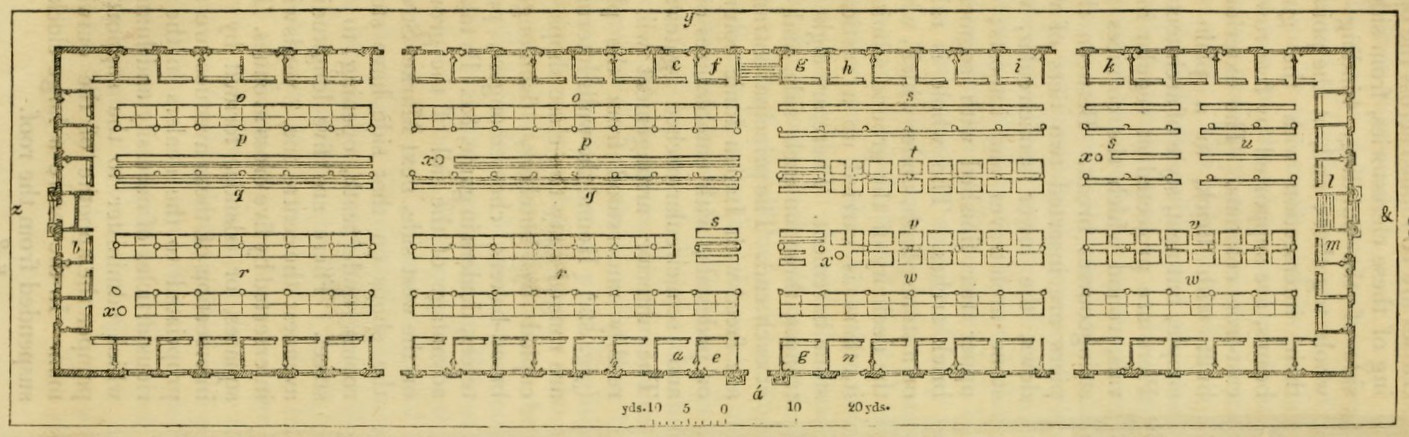
Floorplan of St. John's Market, c.1835. Key: The shops from a to b and from b to c are occupied by butchers, pork dealers, etc. e is the superintendent's counting-house; f, the office for the collectors; g g, rooms for the market weighers. The shops from h to i are occupied by fruiterers; those from k to l are occupied by fishmongers; and the shops from m to n are occupied by dealers in salt provisions, butter and cheese, and by bread-bakers; o o are bacon stalls; p p are tables and benches for eggs and butter; q q, for the sale of poultry; r r, butchers' stalls; s s s, benches; t, fruit stalls; u, fish stalls; v v, stalls for vegetables; w w, stalls for the sale of potatoes and eggs; x x x x, pumps; y, Market Street; z, Elliot Street; &, Roe Street and á, Great Charlotte Street

Within the hall and around its walls were 62 shops, initially occupied by butchers, fishmongers, bread-bakers, cheesemongers, poulterers, dealers in game, &c. By taking advantage of the fall of the ground on the west side, next Market Street, the shops on that side had storerooms underneath, opening to the street. Five longitudinal avenues divided the hall - the centre one, 7 yards (6.4 m) wide - intersected by five cross avenues. The squares, or islands, formed by the intersection of these avenues were subdivided into stalls for general dealers.

The hall was illuminated by 144 gas lamps and provided with a water supply at four pumps, one of which dispensed hot water. A large clock was suspended from the roof in the centre of the hall.

By 1835, plans were drawn to erect new buildings on Great Charlotte Street opposite St. John's Market, exclusively for the wholesale and retail sale of fish, which trade was to be excluded entirely from the larger market.

An 1835 review of the market comments:

The simplicity and convenience of the arrangement will be obvious on inspection, and do great credit to the distinguished architect by whom the building was designed.

The beautiful perspective formed by the vistas of columns 183 yards long, particularly in the evening, when illuminated by successive rows of brilliant gas lamps; and the grandeur of effect produced by the uninterrupted extent of vision in every direction of the busy scene, form altogether a picture that must be seen to be fully appreciated.

It only remains to add, that the ventilation is complete. In the summer a delightful coolness pervades the atmosphere, while in the winter it is all that could be desired as a protection from the inclemency of the season.

The design was also praised by Karl Friedrich Schinkel, who visited in 1826 and sketched it in his dairy.

The British architectural historian Kathryn A. Morrison describes St. John's Market as "the first of the great nineteenth-century market halls ... the first in the form of a completely covered general trading hall", and notes that there is no clear precedent for the design.

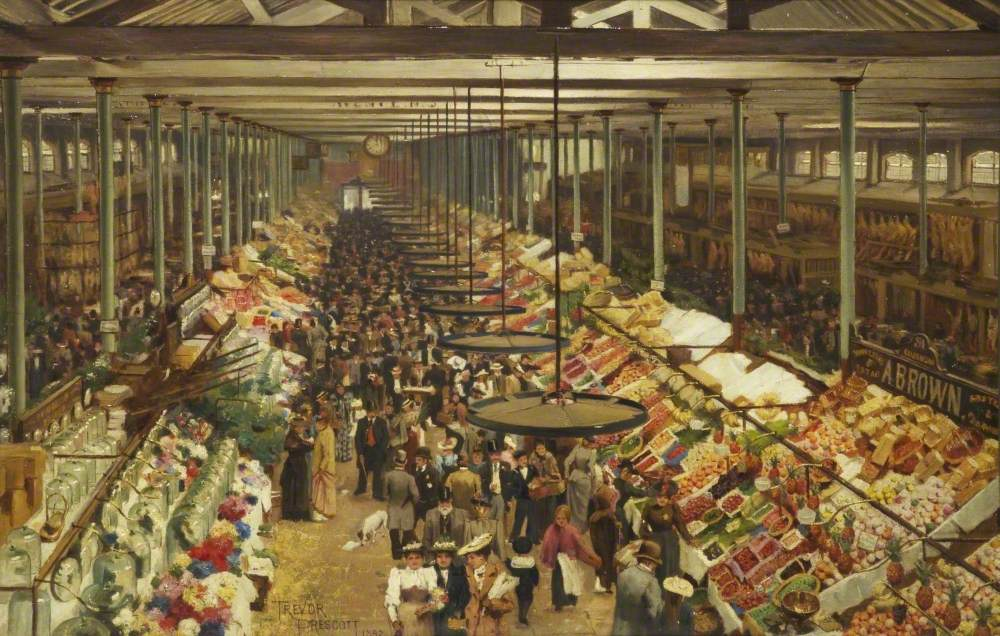
St John's Market, Liverpool by Charles Trevor Prescott

The interior of the market is the subject of a painting in oil, St John's Market, Liverpool by Charles Trevor Prescott, made some time between 1892 and 1899, and now in the Walker Art Gallery; and of another, St John's Market (1827) by Samuel Austin, in pencil and watercolour, now in the Lady Lever Art Gallery, having been acquired by auction at Christie's in 2001.

=== Alterations ===
The building was altered at least twice during its history; in 1881 a new frontage of shops was added on Roe Street, and in 1891 the Elliot Street facade was entirely rebuilt in the Renaissance style. A note in an 1894 electrical trade journal states: "Liverpool - The Markets Committee of the City Council are dissatisfied with the present lighting of St. John’s Market, and they consider that the time has arrived when the place should be electrically lighted."

== Operation ==
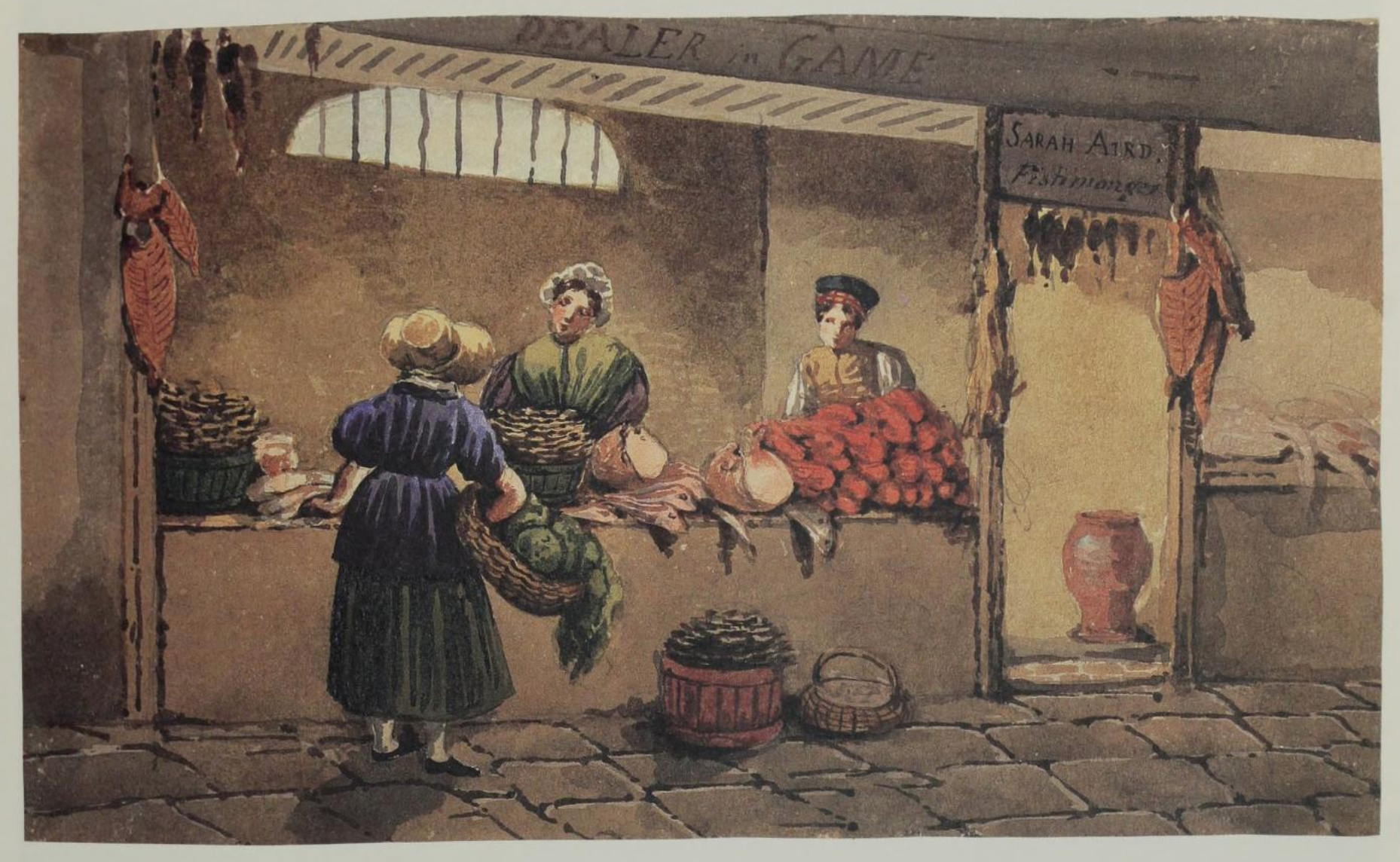
Fish Stall in St John's Market, Liverpool - 1832 illustration by Mary Ellen Best

Principal market-days were, at the outset, Wednesdays and Saturdays; but there was a considerable market every day. Market regulations were devised to provide equal protection for buyer and seller; rates of porterage were regulated, and approved carriers were badged. The hall was cleaned each evening by twelve scavengers engaged for that purpose, and two watchmen were employed to guard the property overnight.

The rents charged in the market in 1831 were: Shops, £18 per annum; cellars, (of which there were 29) £5; butchers' stalls, £8; the corner ones, £10; vegetable and fruit stalls, £6; potato-compartments, £3; the corner ones, £3. 4s.; table-compartments, £1. 12s.; bench-compartments, 12s.; outer fish-standings, £8; the inner ones, £4. Occupiers of shops paid £2. 12s. per annum each for a gaslight.

== Demolition ==
St. John's Market was demolished in 1964, making way for the 1969 St Johns Shopping Centre, (Note: The name of the newer building drops the apostrophe) the western half of which occupies the hall's site. To allow for the reconstruction, a temporary market opened in Great Charlotte Street, in February 1964.
