= Carl Bernard Bartels =

German sculptor

Bartels (3rd from right), around the turn of the century

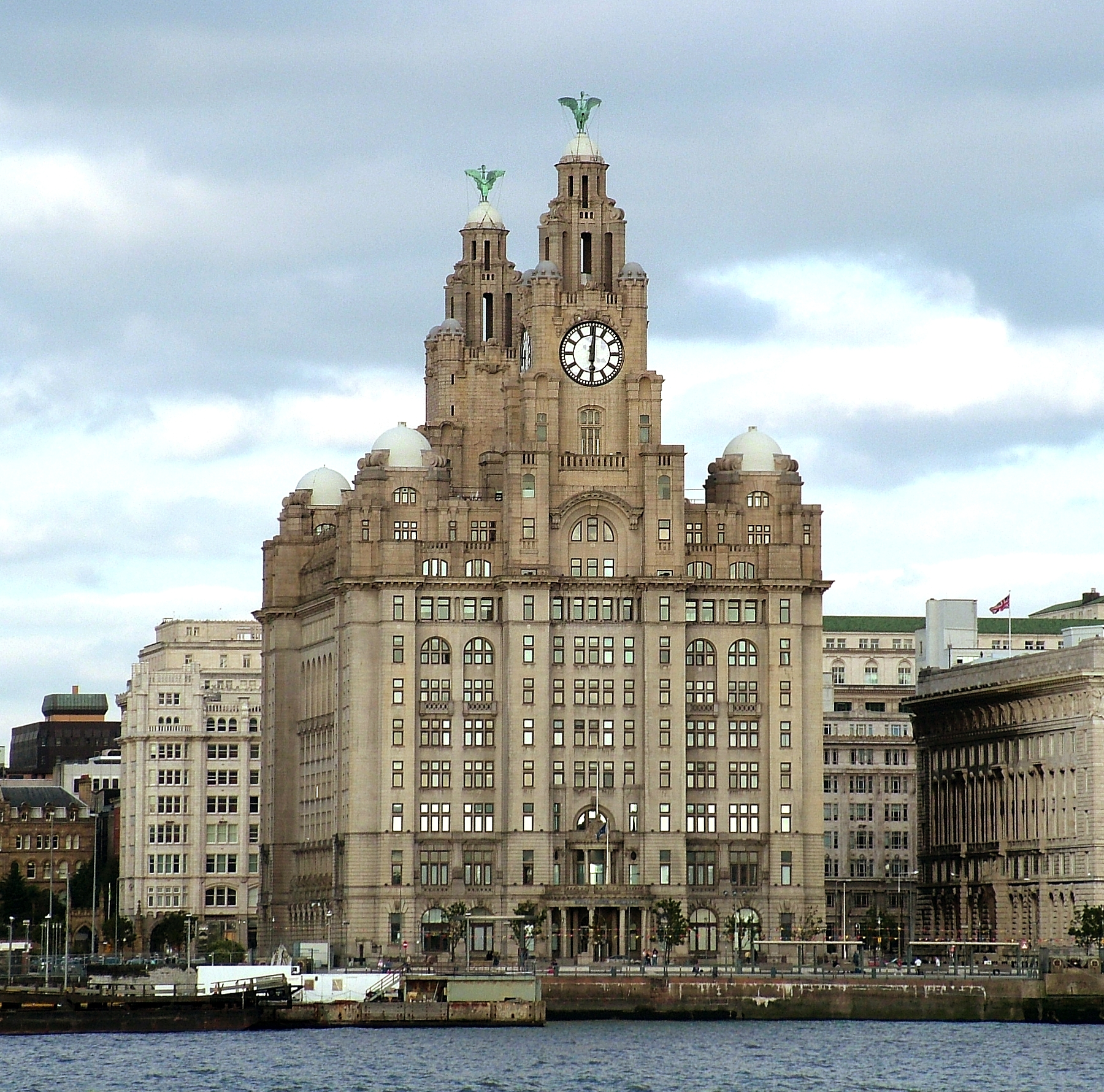
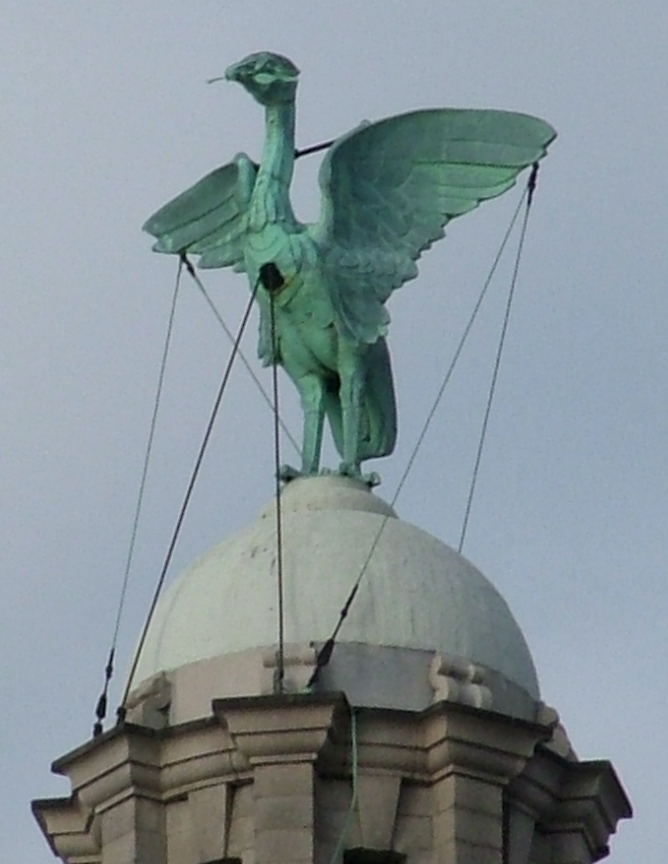
The Royal Liver Building, with a closeup of one of Bartels' liver birds

Carl Bernard Bartels (1866 – 1955) was a sculptor.

Bartels, a wood carver from Stuttgart, Kingdom of Württemberg, moved to Britain after visiting the country during his honeymoon in 1887.

In the early years of the twentieth century, while living and working in Harringay, London, Bartels entered and won a national competition to design the liver birds which stand on the top of Walter Aubrey Thomas's Royal Liver Building on the Pier Head in central Liverpool. Designed by Bartels, the 18 ft (5.5 m) copper liver birds were constructed by the Bromsgrove Guild.

During the First World War, Bartels was interned on the Isle of Man, even though he had been a naturalised Briton for 27 years. After the war Bartels was repatriated to Germany, leaving his wife and two English-born children in England.

Bartels returned to the United Kingdom and lived and worked in Harringay until his death in 1955, producing carvings for Durham Cathedral, various stately homes and making artificial limbs during the Second World War.
