= Samuel Austin (artist) =

English painter (1796–1834)

- Born: 1796; Liverpool, United Kingdom
- Died: 1834 (aged 37–38); Liverpool, United Kingdom

Samuel Austin (1796 – 1834), was an English water-colour painter.

Born in Liverpool in 1796, Austin commenced life as a banker's clerk, but eventually gave up a good position in order to devote himself entirely to the art in which he had excelled as an amateur, and of which he was enthusiastically fond. He exhibited water-colour drawings at the Society of British Artists from 1824 to 1826, and from 1827 at the annual exhibitions of the Society of Painters in Water-Colours, of which body he was elected an associate in the last-named year. He painted landscapes, and occasionally rustic figures: but his best works were coast scenes, introducing boats and figures, some of which were from sketches in the Netherlands, France, and on the Rhine. An example of his work, Shakespeare's Cliff, Dover, with Luggers on the Beach, is in the South Kensington Museum. A View of Dort has been engraved after him by William Miller. He died at Liverpool in July 1834.

His pencil and watercolour St John's Market, depicting the eponymous 1822 building in Liverpool, now in the city's Lady Lever Art Gallery.

His illustration of William Roscoe's birthplace is accompanied by a poetical illustration by Letitia Elizabeth Landon on the subject.
