= Royal Liver Assurance =

Friendly society in the United Kingdom

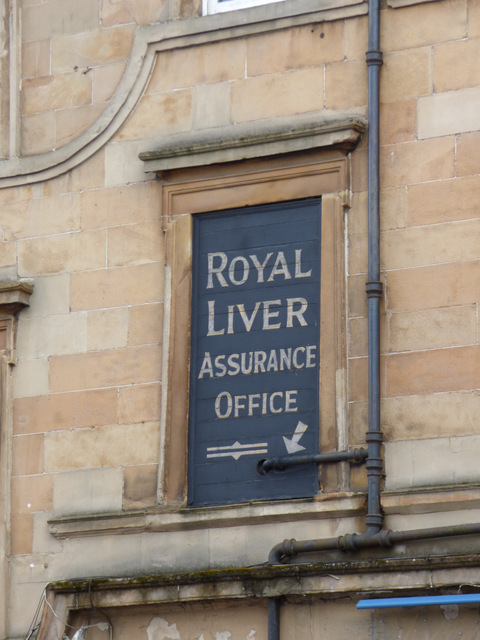
- Formerly: Liverpool Lyver Burial Society
- Founded: July 24, 1850; 176 years ago in the Lyver Inn, Liverpool, England
- Defunct: July 1, 2011
- Fate: Acquired by Royal London
- Headquarters: Royal Liver Building, Liverpool, England, United Kingdom
- Website: www.royalliverassurance.com

Royal Liver Assurance /ˈlaɪvər/ was a friendly society with over 1.7 million members in Ireland and the United Kingdom. Royal Liver and its subsidiaries became part of the Royal London Group on 1 July 2011.

== History ==
The Liverpool Lyver Burial Society was founded by a group of working men from Liverpool in the Lyver Inn on 24 July 1850 to "provide for the decent interment of deceased members".

By 1857 the Society had moved to its fourth head office and had expanded throughout the United Kingdom. By the end of the 1890s a decision was taken to build what would become the Royal Liver Building; it opened on 19 July 1911.

In 1994, it was renamed from Royal Liver Friendly Society Ltd to Royal Liver Assurance ltd.

In 2007, Royal London approached Royal Liver about a possible combination of their businesses, but Royal Liver decided to remain as an independent entity.

During the 2008 financial crisis, the FSA launched Project Chrysalis, aimed at mutual insurance companies. Companies were asked to hold more capital, and to either stop writing new policies, or justify that continuing selling new business would not put existing policyholders at a disadvantage. At the time, it was anticipated that several mutuals would merge due to lack of capital.

Royal Liver had a financial advisor company called Park Row; however this was wound up following an investigation by the FSA in February 2010.

Royal Liver were then approached again by Royal London in February 2010. Talks continued for some time, and the board of Royal Liver agreed the terms of a potential merger in April 2011. The members of Royal Liver voted in favour of the merger in May 2011.
