= Cunard Building =

Listed building in Liverpool, England

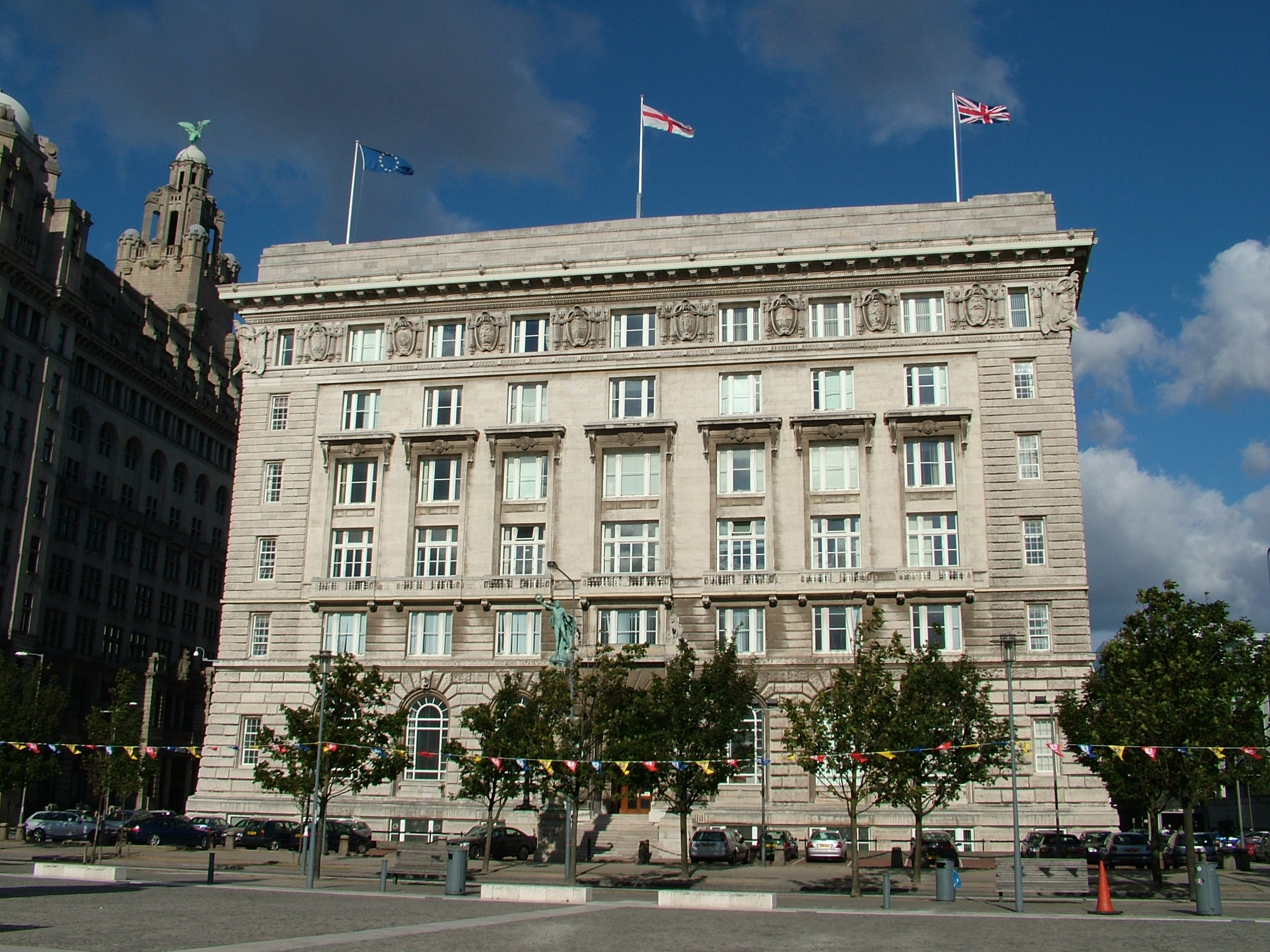

- Location within Liverpool

General information
- Type: Office building
- Architectural style: Italian Renaissance and Greek Revival
- Location: Liverpool, England
- Coordinates: 53.4041°N 2.9954°W
- Current tenants: Variety of public and private sector firms
- Construction started: 1914
- Completed: 1917
- Owner: Liverpool City Council

Technical details
- Structural system: Reinforced concrete with Portland stone cladding

Design and construction
- Architects: William Edward Willink and Philip Coldwell Thicknesse
- Main contractor: Holland, Hannen & Cubitts
- Designations

Listed Building – Grade II*
- Official name: Cunard Building
- Designated: 12 July 1966
- Reference no.: 1052283

The Cunard Building is a Grade II* listed building in Liverpool, England. It is located at the Pier Head and along with the neighbouring Royal Liver Building and Port of Liverpool Building is one of Liverpool's Three Graces, which line the city's waterfront. It is also part of Liverpool's former UNESCO designated World Heritage, the Maritime Mercantile City.

It was designed by William Edward Willink and Philip Coldwell Thicknesse and was constructed between 1914 and 1917. The building's style is a mix of Italian Renaissance and Greek Revival, and its development has been particularly influenced by Italian palace design. The building is noted for the ornate sculptures that adorn its sides.

The building was, from its construction until the 1960s, the headquarters of the Cunard Line, and the building still retains the name of its original owner. It was also home to Cunard's passenger facilities for trans-Atlantic journeys departing from Liverpool. Today, the building is owned by Liverpool City Council and is home to numerous public and private sector organisations, including The British Music Experience. It is located diagonally across the Strand from Albion House, the former headquarters of White Star Line.

== History ==
In 1914 the Cunard Steamship Company commissioned the construction of new headquarters for their company. Cunard's expansion meant that they had outgrown their previous offices, which were also in Liverpool, and the site chosen for construction was at the former George's Dock, in between the Royal Liver Building and Port of Liverpool Building. The building was designed by the architects William Edward Willink and Philip Coldwell Thicknesse and was inspired by the grand palaces of Renaissance Italy – particularly the Farnese Palace at Rome. It was constructed by Holland, Hannen & Cubitts between 1914 and 1917, with Arthur J. Davis, of Mewes and Davis, acting as consultant on the project.

In 1934 the Cunard Steamship Company merged with the White Star Line to form Cunard White Star Line, becoming the largest passenger steamship company in the world and helping to make Liverpool one of the most important centres of the British trans-Atlantic ocean liner industry. The Cunard building subsequently acted as the central headquarters for the newly merged firm, with both administrative and ship-designing facilities located within the building. Many famous ships were developed and designed at the Cunard Building, including the RMS Queen Mary, RMS Queen Elizabeth and the Queen Elizabeth 2.

Given that Liverpool was a major trans-Atlantic port, and due to the building's proximity to the River Mersey, the lower floors of the Cunard Building were allocated to provide space for liner passengers, both before and after sailing. Within the building were passenger facilities, including separate waiting rooms for first, second and third class passengers, a booking hall, luggage storage space, and a currency exchange. The building also provided facilities for both land and sea-based Cunard employees.

During the Second World War, the sub-basement level of the Cunard Building was used as an air raid shelter for workers in the building and also for those from adjacent premises. The basement levels also served as the central Air Raid Precautions headquarters for the City of Liverpool during the war. Additional reinforced steel joists were fitted to further strengthen the basement in case of a direct hit on the building.

The building remained the headquarters of Cunard until the 1960s, when they decided to relocate their UK operations to Southampton on England's south coast and their global headquarters to New York. Cunard subsequently sold the building to Prudential plc in 1969. In 1965 the Cunard Building was awarded Grade II* listed building status by the English Heritage. Initially, it was listed together with the Royal Liver Building and the Port of Liverpool Building under Pier Head, but in 1985 each building gained its own listing. In November 2001 the building was sold to the Merseyside Pension Fund, an organisation providing pension services to public sector workers on Merseyside. Today, the building provides a range of office accommodation for a variety of public and private sector organisations. In November 2008 it was announced that the building managers had appointed the local architects firm Buttress Fuller Alsop Williams to draw up a conservation plan to preserve the building. The plan involved collaboration with English Heritage and the Local Authority Conservation Officer and would be used to control any modification and repairs made to the building.

In October 2013, Liverpool City Council approved the acquisition of the Cunard Building for use as offices and as a cruise liner terminal. The Council projected that the building would accommodate 1,000 staff relocated from Millennium House and leases in the Capital Building, saving an estimated £1.3 million. The anticipated use as cruise terminal however had to be abandoned due to the high costs associated with security and border control.

== Architectural design ==
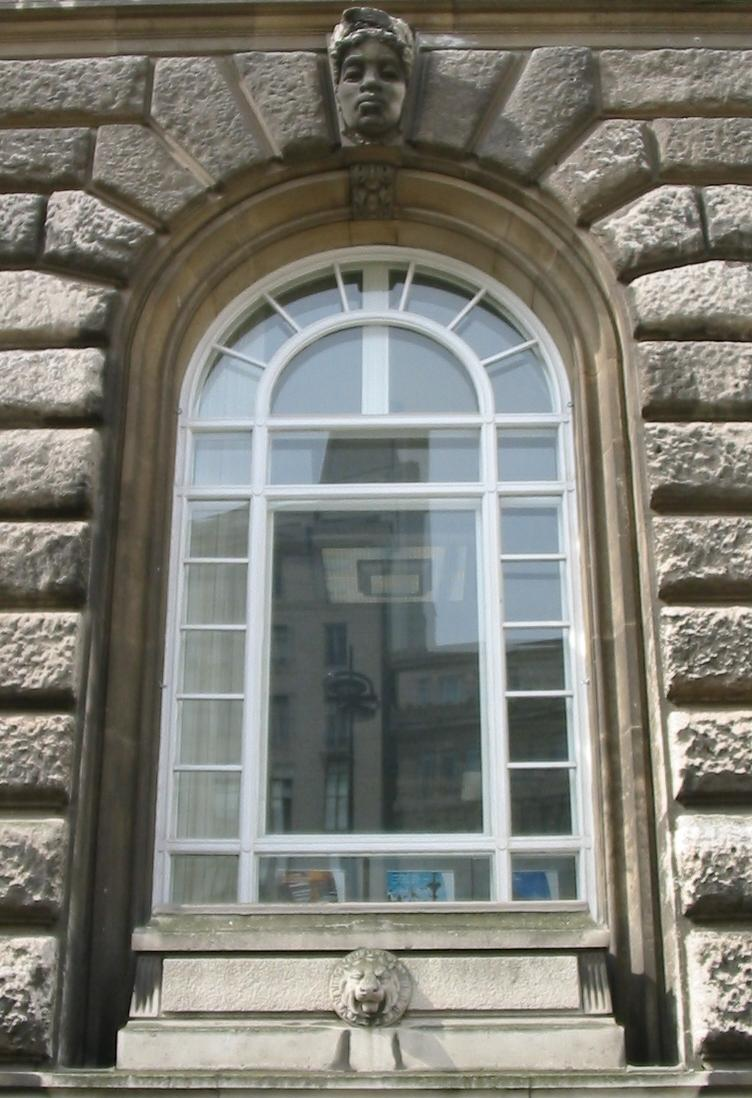
One of the faces of the world representing the global nature of Cunard's operations

The Cunard Building's architectural style can be generally described as a mix of Italian Renaissance and Greek Revival, with a degree of Beaux-Arts influence on the building's structural form. Willink and Caldwell's designs were heavily influenced by the work of Italian architect Baldassare Peruzzi and more broadly Italian Renaissance palace design in general, with the Farnese Palace in Rome believed to have been particularly influential. Despite the strong Italian influence, the architects chose to introduce Greek style for the details around the building itself and, as the building itself is larger than the Italian palaces that provided its inspiration, its structural form was prominently based upon American Beaux-Arts buildings such as those in New York.

The Cunard Building is approximately rectangular in shape, with nine bays on the east and west sides, and seventeen bays on the north and south sides. However, as it was constructed after the Royal Liver Building and Port of Liverpool Building on either side of it, space limitations meant that the east (landward) side was actually built 30 feet (9 m) wider than the west. The central bays on each side provide the main entrance points into the building. Each entrance consists or a large panelled oak door, adorned by a pair of fluted columns and with a coffered ceiling. The Cunard Building stands six storeys tall and has two basement levels. Due to its construction on the site of the former George's Dock, part of the original dock wall is still visible in the eastern boundary of the first basement level.

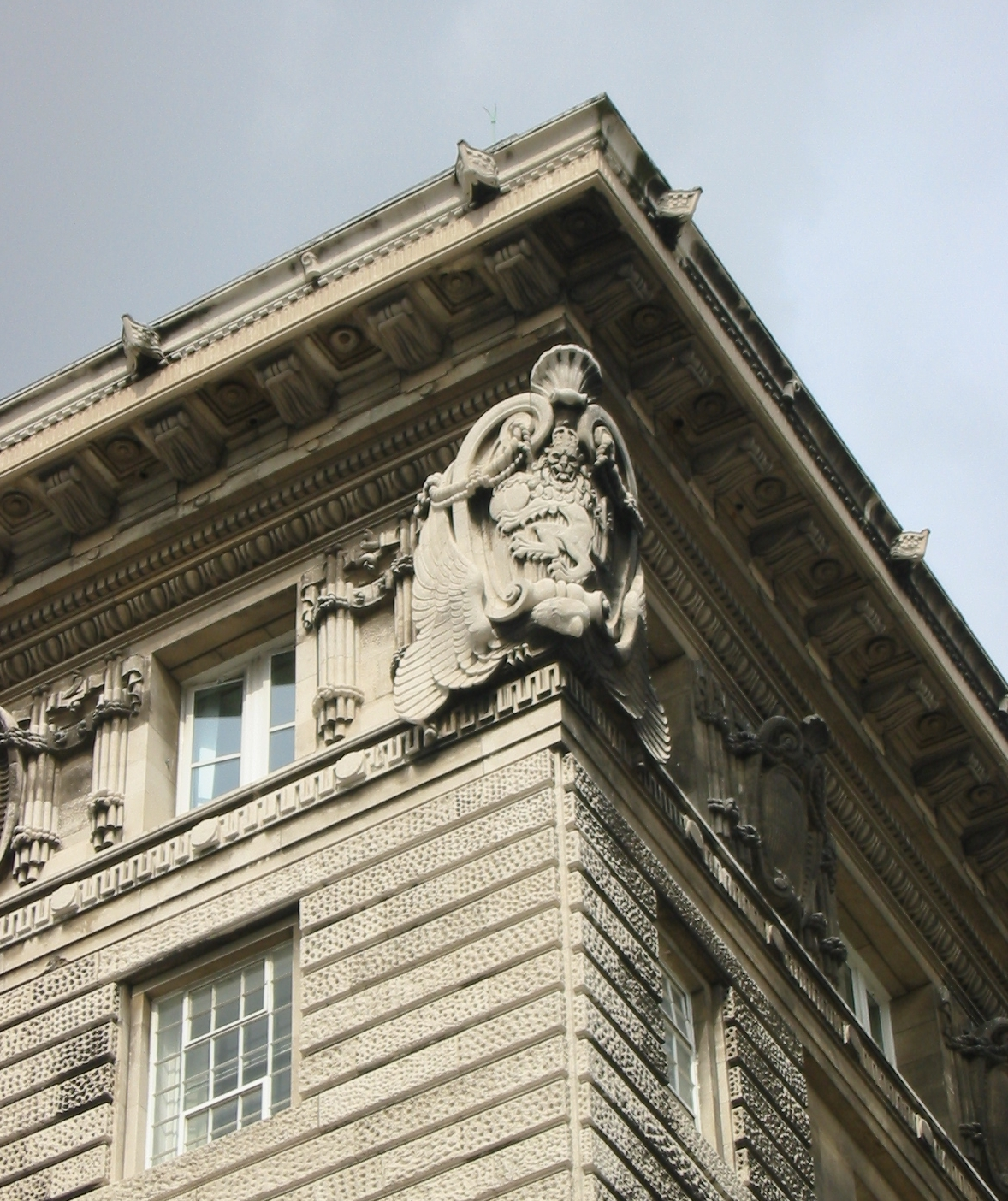
The Cunard Building is adorned by several highly detailed sculptures, including this one depicting a rampant lion, raised on its hind legs.

The frame of the building was constructed from reinforced concrete, which was then clad in Portland stone. Several highly detailed sculptures adorn the outside of the building, including ones of Britannia and Neptune, as well as others representing peace, war, and storms. There are also sculptures of the Zodiac and the coat of arms of the United Kingdom's allies during World War I. Another series of sculptures on the building depict different races from around the world, which reflect the global operations of the Cunard company. Marble was used to furnish several parts of the inside of the building, particularly on the ground floor corridors that link the north and south entrances. It was imported from several locations in Italy and Greece, including Attica, Carrara, and Arni Alto.

As the initial usage of the Cunard Building was mixed, there are a variety of features within the building that reflect the original purposes of different areas within. Initially, Cunard's administration facilities were located on the upper floors and due to the necessity for large amounts of light in the design facilities, these rooms where developed to include both toplights in the roof and also large windows to maximise the amount of natural light. Another feature are the high quality and ornate fittings present in what was once the first class passenger lounge, located on the first floor. These fittings are also present in the former board room, located in a 'commanding' position on the fifth floor, overlooking the river below.

Among the most notable features of the Cunard Building are the large basement and sub-basement levels that initially acted as storage facilities for both the company's property and also the luggage of passengers. Coal was also stored in the basement, with a small railway track providing a link to the boiler room, which was used to heat the building. Many original features of the basement still exist, including the timber baggage racks, ship logs and other maritime documents. Several secure vaults, originally used to store the most valuable passenger items, are still used today to hold historic documents, drawings and blueprints relating to the Cunard Building and also some of Cunard's ships, such as the RMS Queen Mary.

== Cunard War Memorial ==
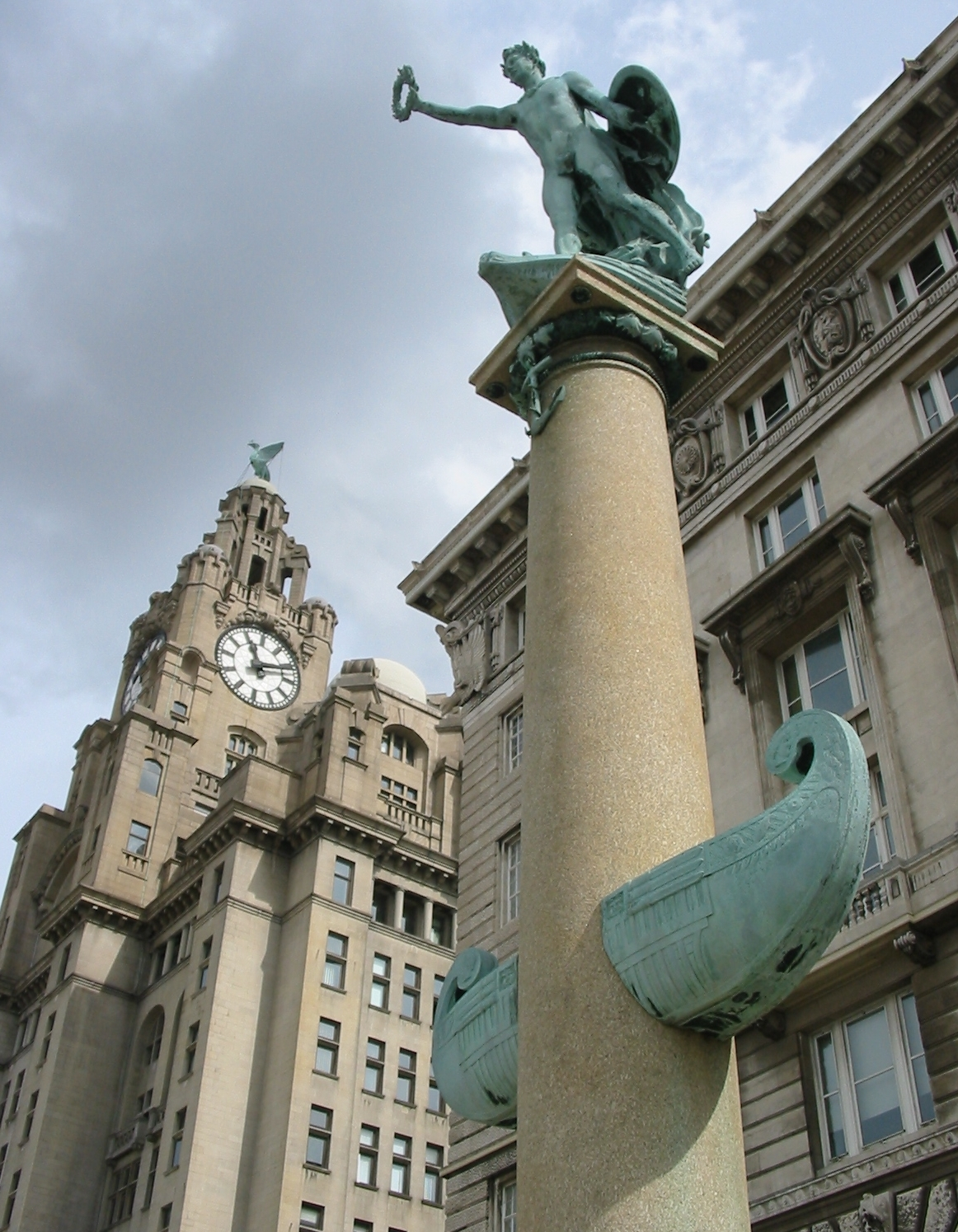
The Cunard War Memorial

The Cunard War Memorial is located on the west side of the Cunard Building and was erected in memory of the Cunard employees who were killed during the First World War, and later the Second World War. A Grade II listed monument, it was designed by Arthur Davis, who acted as consultant during the construction of the Cunard Building itself. It was erected around 1920, although it was not officially unveiled until 1921, by the Earl of Derby, Edward Stanley. Prior to being located at the Pier Head, the monument had been exhibited at the Royal Academy of Arts in London.

The monument consists of a large bronze statue that sits upon a Doric style column, which is itself raised above the ground by a pedestal base. The statue was sculpted by Henry Alfred Pegram, whilst John Stubbs & Sons provided the stonework. Due to the architects wishes that the monument be in keeping with the design of the Cunard Building, Davis designed the memorial to match the Greek features of building. The figure on top is of man, who is said to represent Victory, standing above the prow of a Roman ship. Around him there are other naval references including ropes, anchors, and shells. After the Second World War, the monument become dedicated to all Cunard employees who died in both wars. An inscription on the side of the memorial reads "Pro Patria", which is Latin for "For One's Country".

== See also ==
- Architecture of Liverpool
- Grade II* listed buildings in Liverpool – City Centre
