= Royal Liver Building =

Commercial offices in Liverpool, England

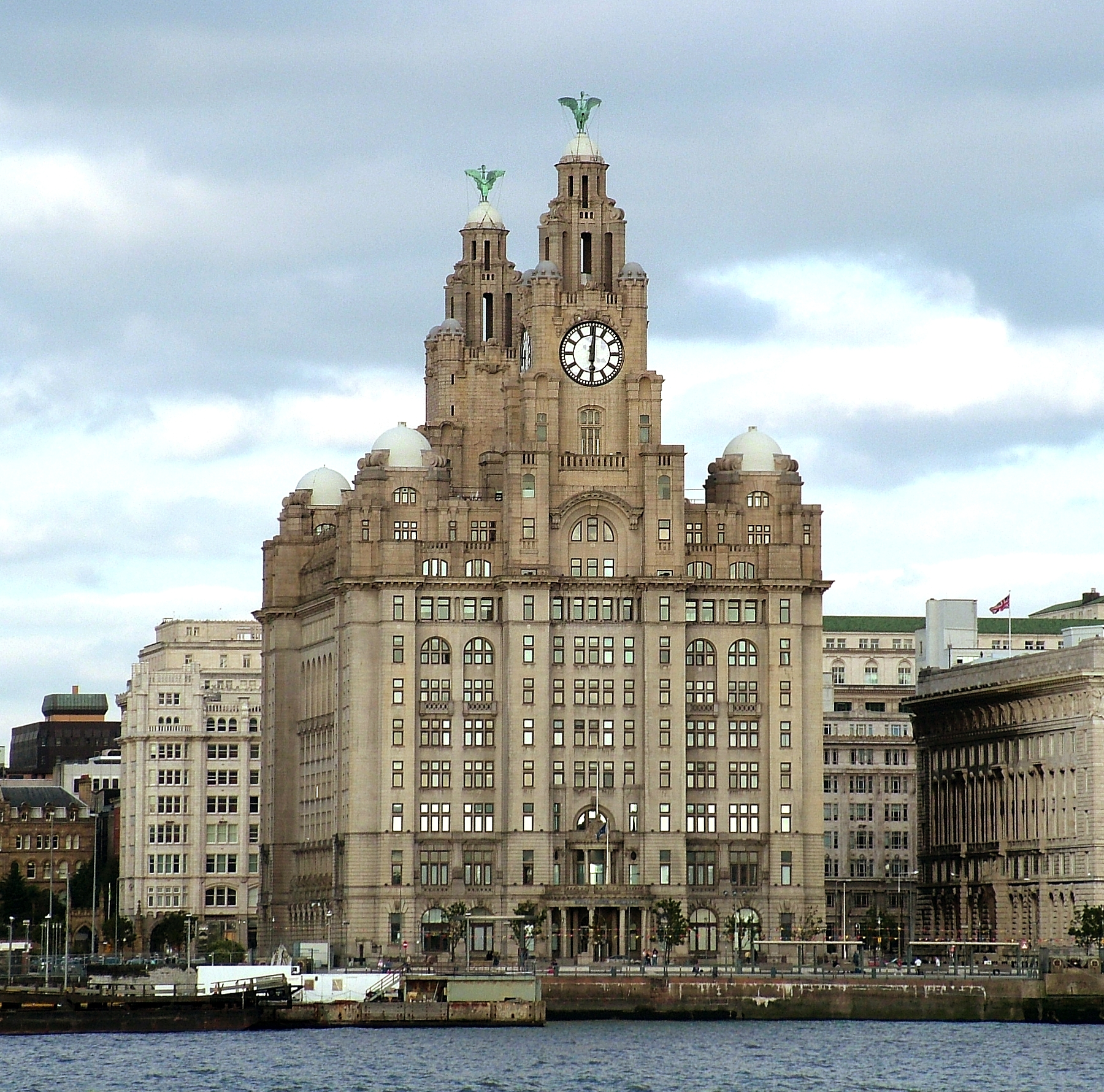
- Royal Liver Building, Pier Head, Liverpool
- Interactive map of the Royal Liver Building area
- Alternative names: The Liver Building; Royal Liver Assurance Building

General information
- Type: Commercial offices
- Architectural style: Edwardian Baroque style
- Location: Pier Head, Liverpool, England, United Kingdom
- Coordinates: 53.4058°N 2.9958°W
- Construction started: 1908
- Completed: 1911
- Cost: £800,000
- Owner: Princes Group

Height
- Architectural: 98.2 m (322 ft)
- Roof: 50.9 m (167 ft)

Technical details
- Floor count: 13
- Lifts/elevators: 12

Design and construction
- Architect: Walter Aubrey Thomas
- Structural engineer: L. G. Mouchel & Partners
- Main contractor: Edmund Nuttall Limited
- Designations

Listed Building – Grade I
- Official name: Royal Liver Building
- Designated: 12 July 1966
- Reference no.: 1356370

Website
- https://royalliverbuilding.co.uk

The Royal Liver Building /ˈlaɪvər/ is a Grade I listed building in Liverpool, England. It is located at the Pier Head and along with the neighbouring Cunard Building and Port of Liverpool Building is one of Liverpool's Three Graces, which line the city's waterfront. It was also part of Liverpool's formerly UNESCO-designated World Heritage Maritime Mercantile City.

Opened in 1911, the building was the purpose-built home of Royal Liver Assurance. The Royal Liver Building is one of the most recognisable landmarks in the city of Liverpool with its two fabled Liver birds, which watch over the city and the sea.

== History ==
In 1907, Royal Liver Assurance was in need for larger premises and approved the construction of a new head office. The foundation stone was laid on 11 May 1908. The building was designed by Walter Aubrey Thomas in the Edwardian Baroque style and built by Edmund Nuttall Limited. The building is an early example of a building constructed using reinforced concrete, and given the building's radical design was considered by some to "be impossible to build". The structural engineering advisor was L. G. Mouchel & Partners. The building was officially opened by Lord Sheffield on 19 July 1911.

In 1953, electronic chimes were installed to serve as a memorial to the members of Royal Liver Assurance who died during the two World Wars.

The building remained the head office for Royal Liver Assurance until its merger with Royal London Group in 2011.

In October 2016, the building was put up for sale for the first time in its history. The owner instructed CBRE Group to list the sale with a guide price of more than £40m. In February 2017, Luxembourg-based investment group, Corestate Capital, bought the building for £48 million along with Everton F.C. majority shareholder Farhad Moshiri. Moshiri planned to run Everton's affairs from the building and have his own office to include a view of the new stadium on Bramley Moore Dock.

In 2019, as part of a larger repositioning of the building, a visitor attraction was opened giving the public the chance to tour the West Clock Tower of the building on a regular basis for the first time in its then 108 year history.

The Royal Liver Building served as the filming location for the exterior of the Gotham City Police Department headquarters in the 2022 film The Batman.

The Liver Building was sold again in 2025, with long-term tenant Princes Group purchasing the building for £60 million.

== Description ==
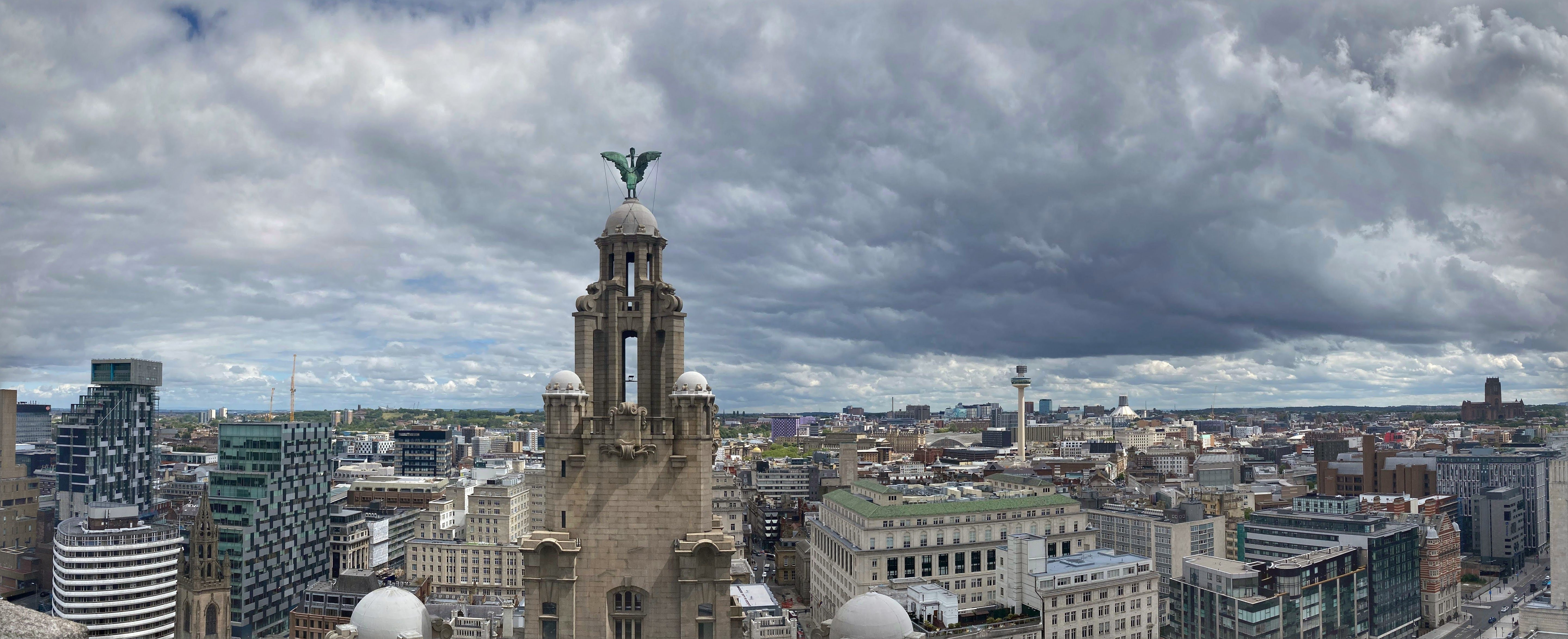
Modern view from the top of the building looking south east

The building overlooks the River Mersey from its waterfront location on the Pier Head and forms one of the 'Three Graces' along with the Port of Liverpool Building and the Cunard Building. It has ten storeys, including two in the roof. An 18 ft (5.5 m) copper Liver bird stands on each clock tower, designed by Carl Bernard Bartels.

The building is crowned by a pair of clock towers. The clocks were made by Gent and Co. of Leicester. The clock faces are 7.6 m (25 ft) in diameter, larger than those of London's famous landmark, the Great Westminster Clock, holding the distinction of being the largest electronically driven clocks in the UK. The four clock faces have no numerals, only facets indicating the 12 hours. These are disposed as three on the riverside tower, facing west/north/south, the remaining one on the landward tower facing east. There is only one mechanism driving the faces on both of the towers. They were originally named George clocks, because they were started at the precise time that King George V was crowned on 22 June 1911.

== Tenants ==
Tenants in the Royal Liver Building include:

- Kyndryl
- ITV
- Princes Group
- Publiship
- SportPesa

== Gallery ==
The Royal Liver Building - Liverpool Mathew Street Music Festival 2006

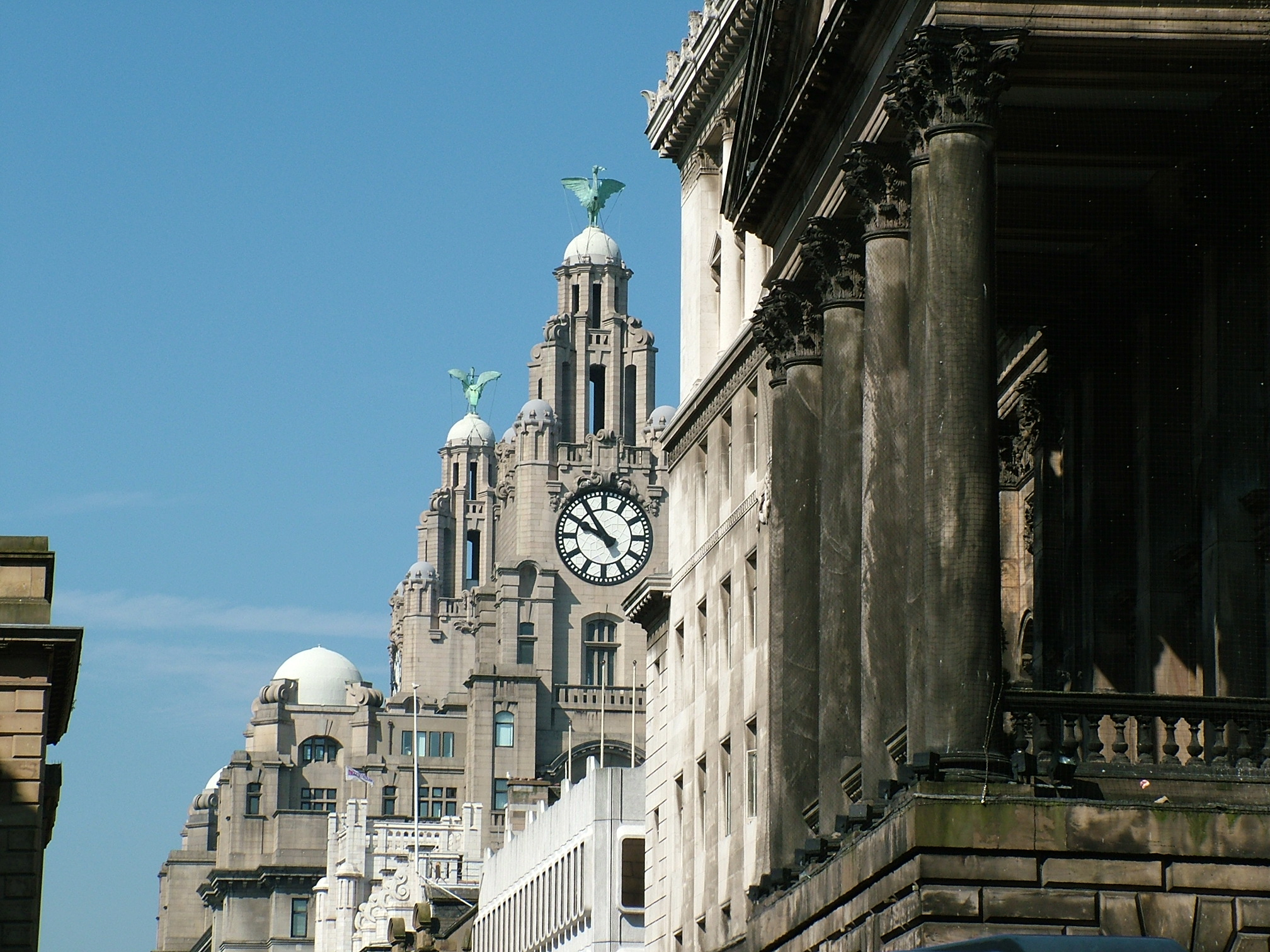
Liver birds tower over Dale Street and the Town Hall

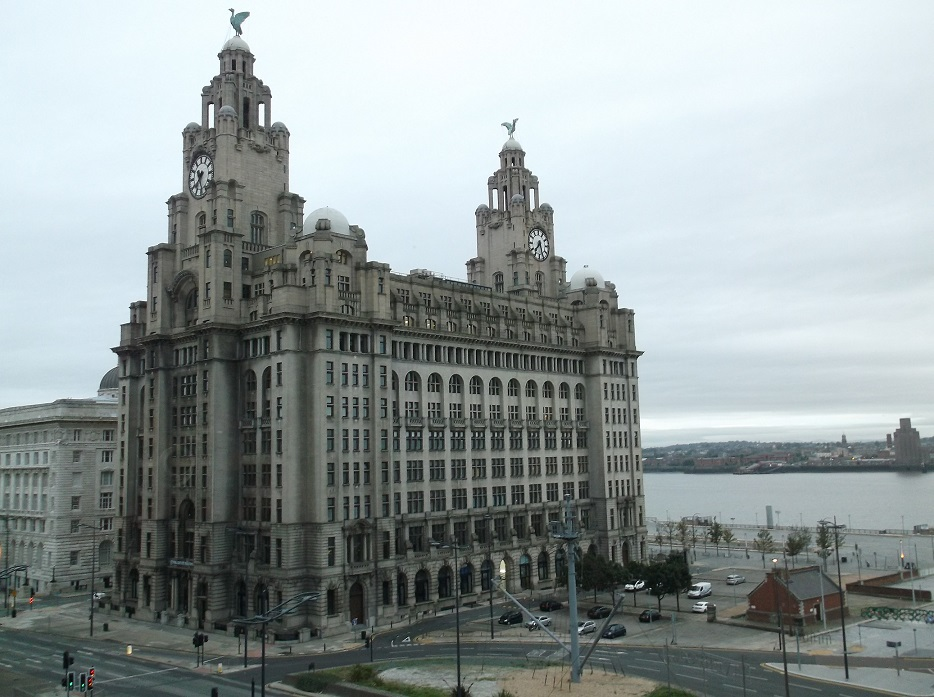
The Royal Liver Building, seen from the nearby Atlantic Tower

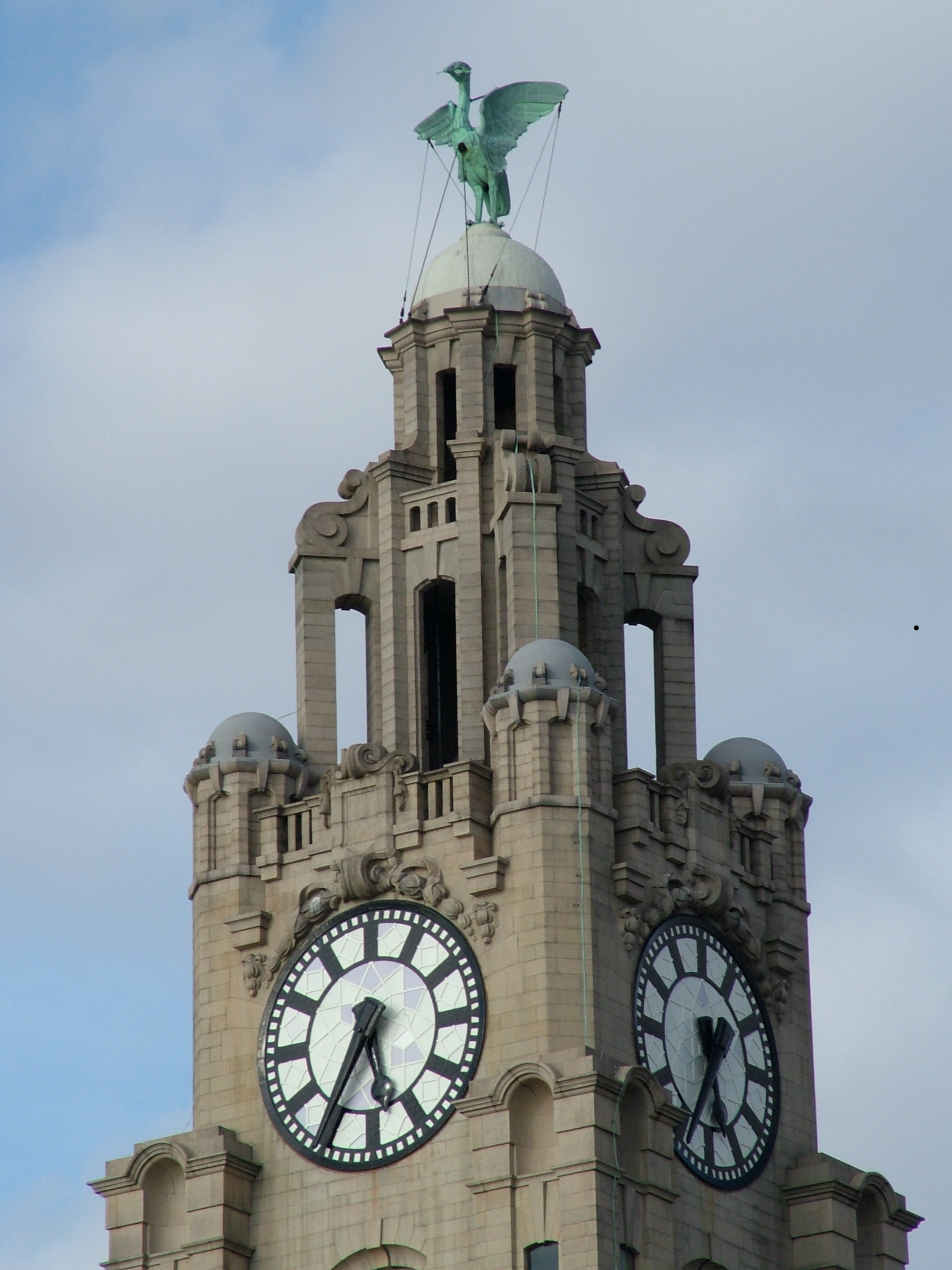
The riverside tower

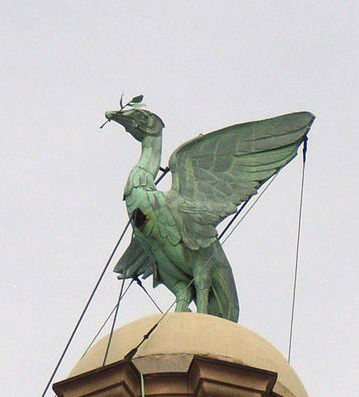
One of the two Liver birds that sit atop each tower of the building

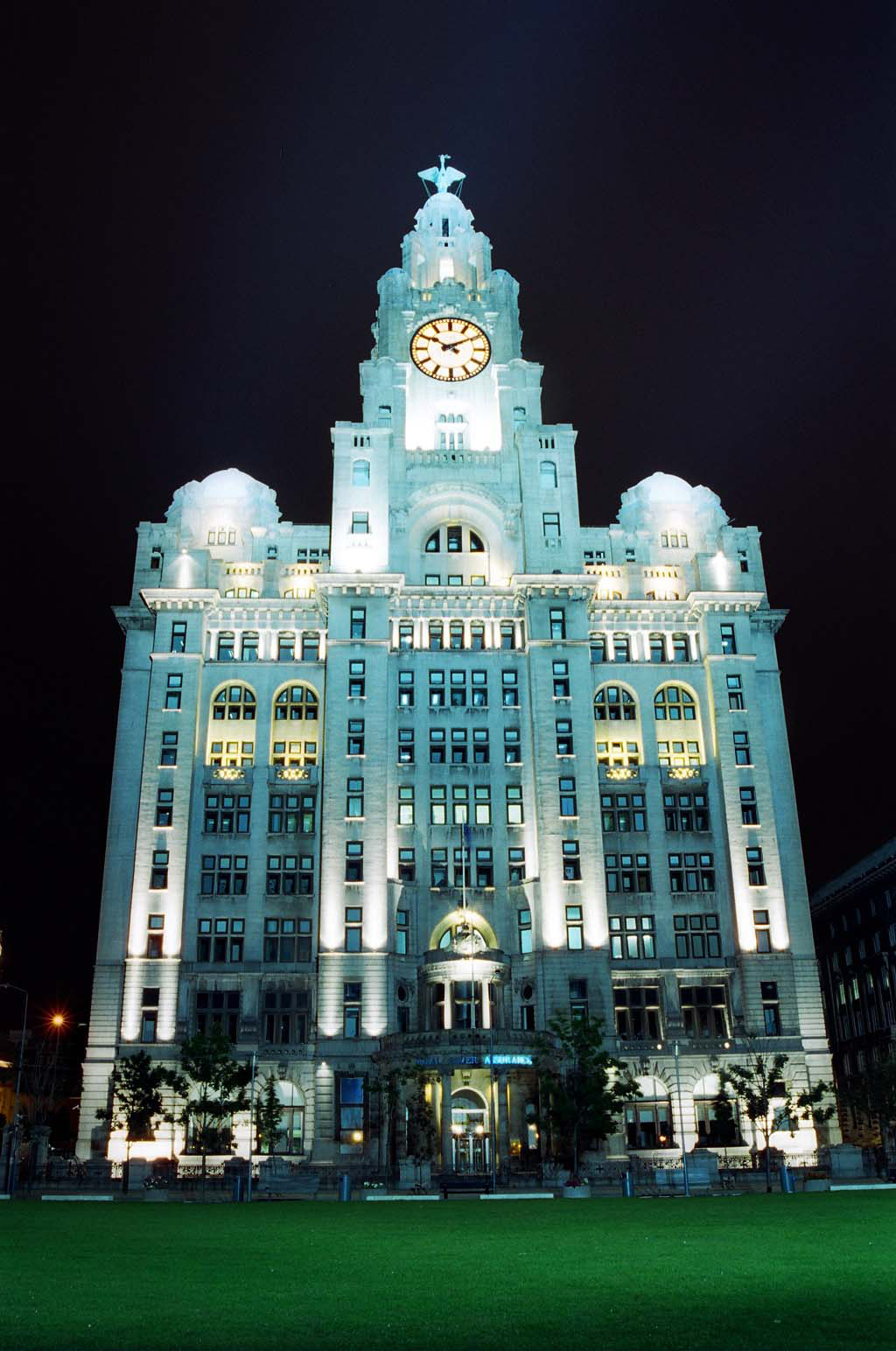
The Royal Liver Building is floodlit at night

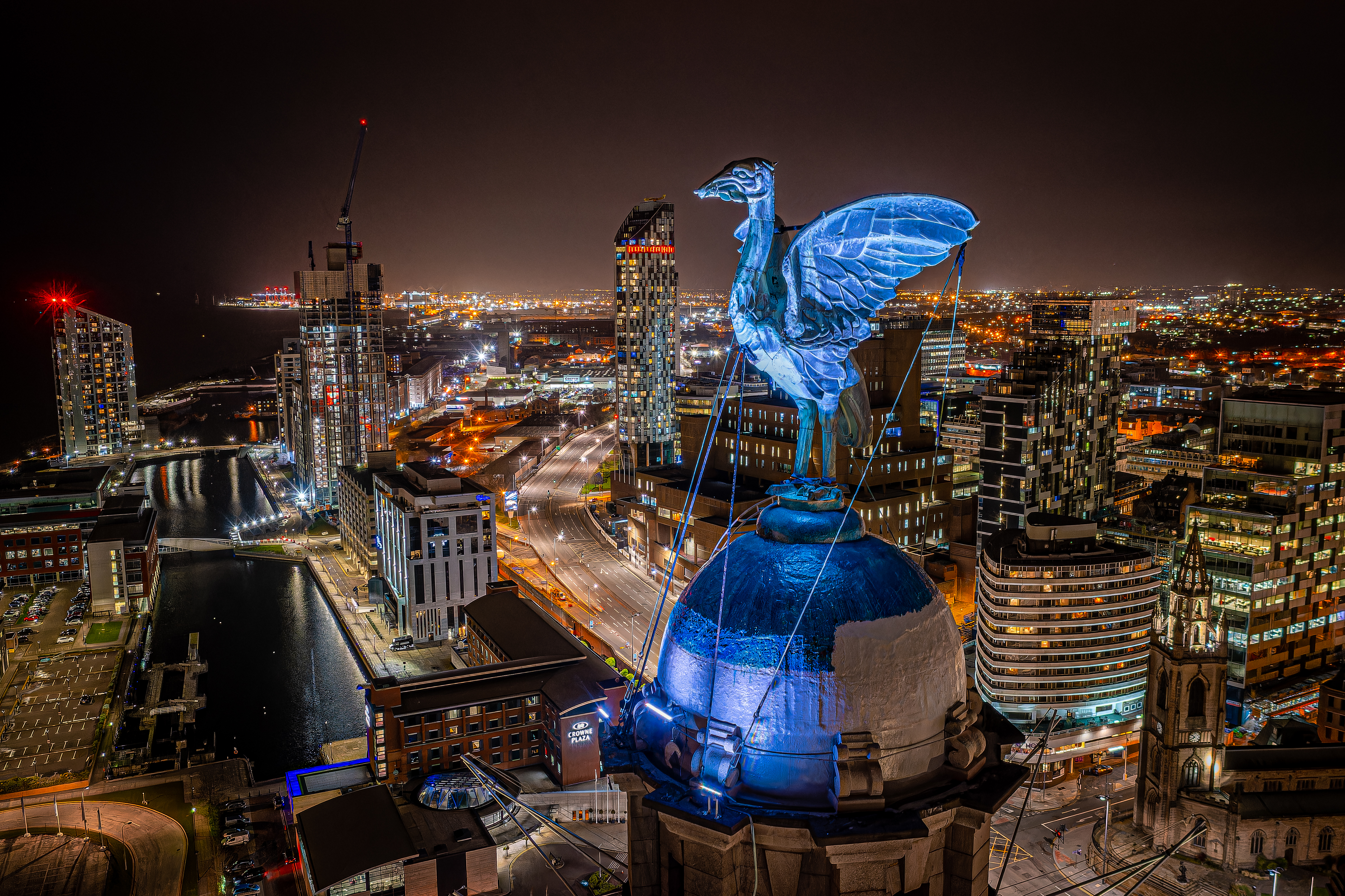
Drone photo of one of the Liver birds on the Royal Liver Building, Liverpool

== See also ==
- Architecture of Liverpool
