= Robert Irving Barrow =

British painter (born 1805)

- Born: 1 August 1805
- Baptised: 17 September 1805
- Died: circa 1890
- Occupation: Architectural illustrator, artist, engraver
- Relatives: Elizabeth Dickens

Robert Irving Barrow (1 August 1805 – c. 1890) was a British architectural illustrator, artist and engraver, several of whose works were used as the basis for popular prints, examples of which are in the collections of major museums. Some of his works are attributed to R. J. Barrow.

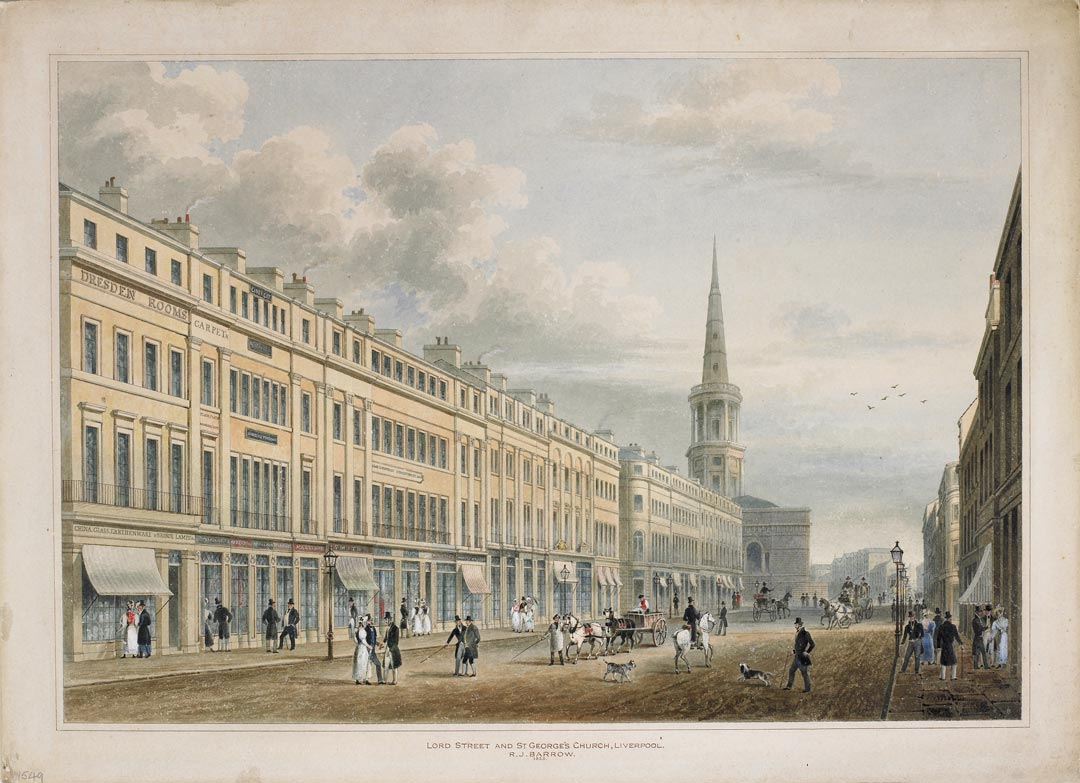
Lord Street and St George's Church, Liverpool (1828)

Barrow was the uncle of novelist Charles Dickens, being the younger brother of Elizabeth Dickens, née Barrow, Charles' mother.

Barrow drew and painted a number of Liverpool scenes, including St. John's Market, the Custom House, the George's Parade baths, Lord Street, Lime Street railway station, St George's Church and St James Cemetery.

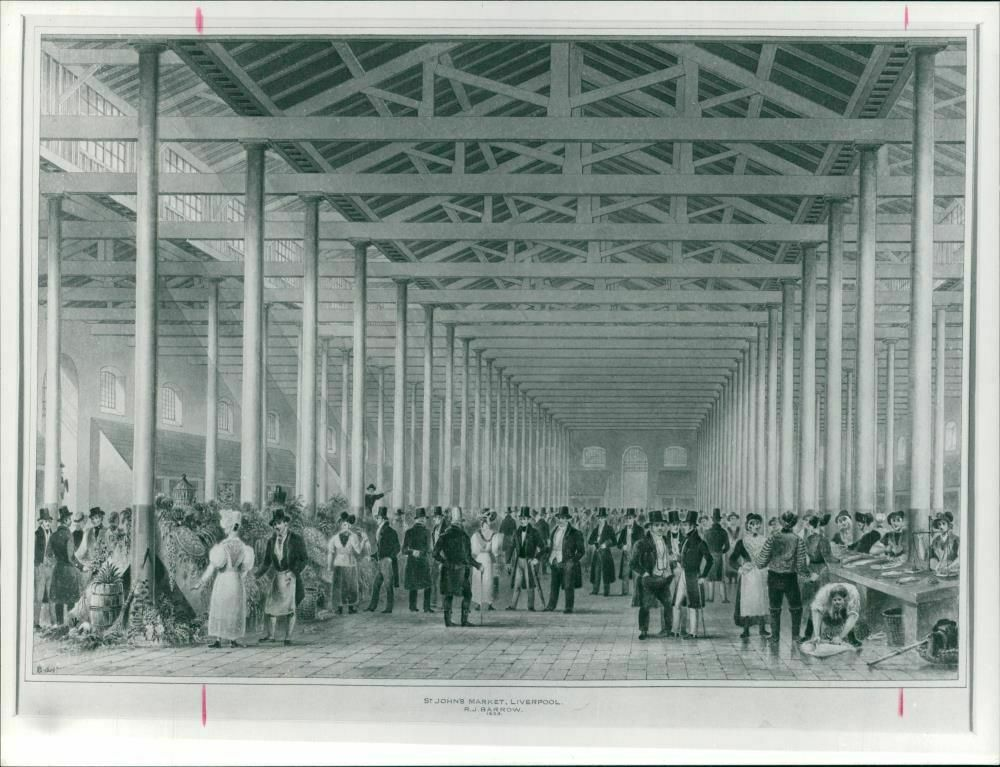
Photograph of an 1834 print of St John's Market, Liverpool, credited "R. J. Barrow"

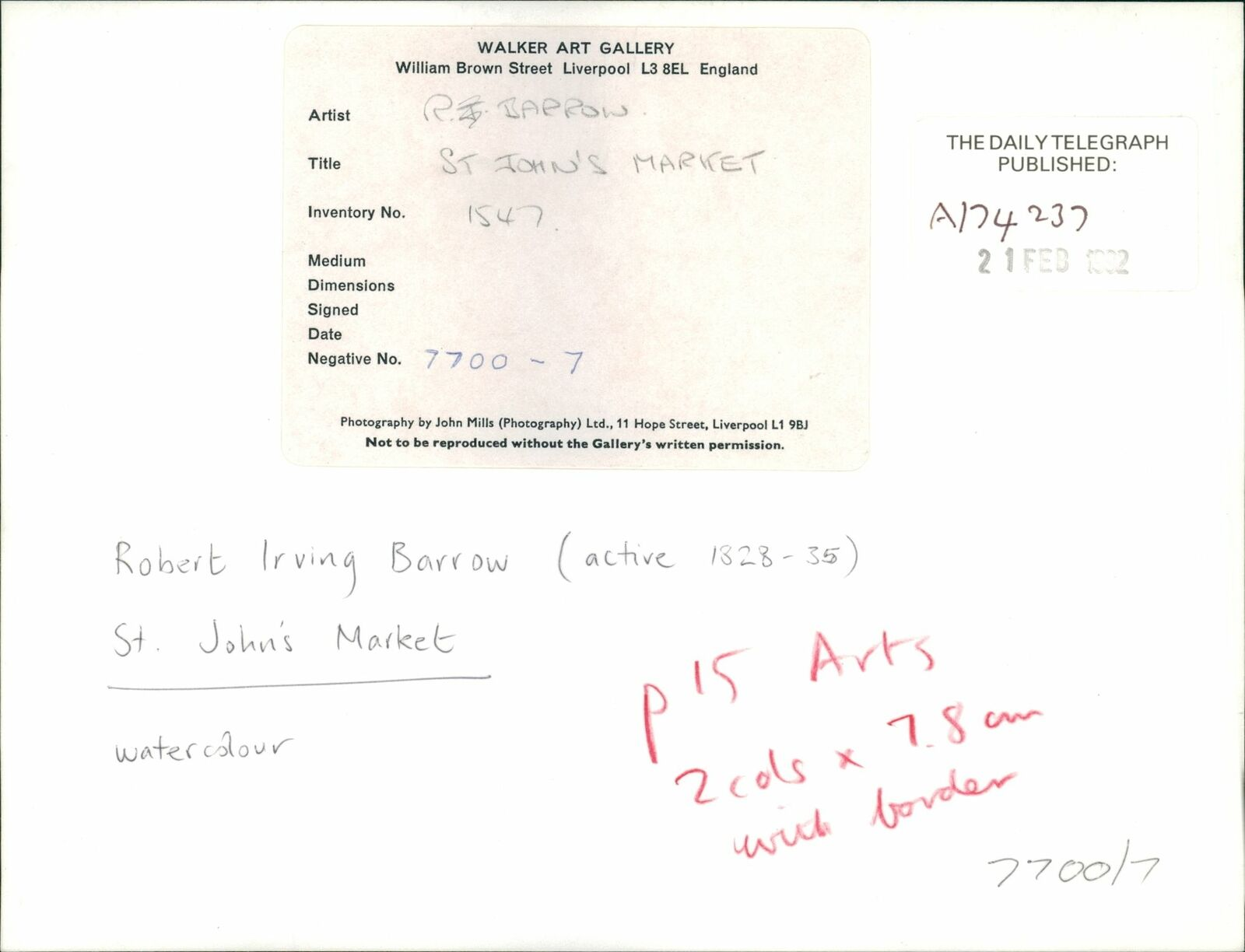
Walker Art Gallery label on the reverse of the above photograph, naming the artist as "Robert Irving Barrow"

Barrow exhibited a "drawing in watercolour", St. Martin's Market, at the Liverpool Academy of Arts' exhibition in 1832. At the same time he exhibited (Banqueting Hall) Design for a "Fishmongers’ Hall," London, and River Front—Design for a Fishmongers’ Hall, London, each being "one for a series of Competition Drawings submitted to the company by F. Long and R. I. Barrow".

Works with the latter two titles were also exhibited at the Royal Academy in 1834; at that time he gave two addresses, "Liverpool", and, in London, "84, Abingdon-street".

The Walker Art Gallery, Liverpool holds his watercolour St John's Market, Liverpool, and prints of New Baths, George's Parade, Liverpool (1828; WAG 1546) and Lord Street and St George's Church, Liverpool (1828; WAG 1549).

The British Museum holds lithographic prints of two of his works, Saint John's market Liverpool (BM 1893,0803.93) and South view of Saint James' cemetery, Liverpool (BM 1893,0803.94) The Science Museum, London, has a copy of the print of his Railway Station Lime Street Liverpool of 1838, lithographed by W. Crane of Chester and published by Thomas Kay.
