= Kathryn A. Morrison =

British architectural historian

- Born: 1959 (age 66–67)
- Occupation: Architectural historian
- Awards: Alice Davis Hitchcock Award (2004)

Academic background
- Education: University of Edinburgh, Courtauld Institute of Art

Academic work
- Discipline: History of Art

Kathryn A. Morrison (born 1959) is a British architectural historian.

== Education ==
Kathryn A. Morrison attended the University of Edinburgh and the Courtauld Institute of Arts.

== Career ==
Morrison was a Senior Architectural Investigator with RCHME, English Heritage and Historic England. Until 2019 she was joint Head of Historic Places Investigation with Historic England.

Photographs contributed by Morrison to the Conway Library at the Courtauld Institute of Art are currently being digitised as part of the Courtauld Connects project.

Morrison served as Chairman of the Society of Architectural Historians of Great Britain in 2009–2012. She was Honorary Reviews Editor for the same society in 2007-2015

== Awards and honours ==
Morrison was elected fellow of the Society of Antiquaries of London in 1995.

She was awarded the Alice Davis Hitchcock Award by the Society of Architectural Historians of Great Britain in 2004 for English Shops and Shopping, followed by the RIBA Book Prize for the same book in the following year. Jessica Sewell noted that “The volume serves as a model for what can be learned from careful, in-depth observation of material culture in the form of the built environment [...] it provides readers with the tools to recognize the period and use of English shops from almost any era". Claire Walsh commented that the book is “...an impressive body of material, particularly the collection of illustrations which includes photographs of current retail outlets, of surviving shops and shop fronts from the medieval period onwards”.

With John Minnis, co-author, Morrison has been awarded several prizes for the Carscapes book:

- Peter Neaverson Award for Outstanding Scholarship awarded by the Association for Industrial Archaeology, 2014
- The Railway & Canal Historical Society's Transport Book of the Year Awards 2014.
- The Michael Sedgwick Award, presented by the Society of Automotive Historians in Britain, 2013.
- It was also shortlisted for the 2014 Art Book Prize given by the Authors' Club and shortlisted by the Alice Davis Hitchcock 2014 Award sponsored by the Society of Architectural Historians of Great Britain.

Writing in Architectural Heritage journal, Neil Gregory noted that Carscapes is "a lavishly presented account that aims to document building types more often than not overlooked in general architecture histories".

== Selected works ==
- The Workhouse: a study of poor-law buildings in England, 1999, Royal Commission on the Historical Monuments of England. ISBN 1873592361
- English shops and shopping : an architectural history, 2004, Yale University Press ISBN 0300102194
- The Fever Wards, Stamford Hospital, Uffington Road, Stamford : historic buildings assessment,2015, Historic England.
- Woolworth's: 100 years on the high street, 2015, Historic England.ISBN 9781848022461
- Apethorpe: The Story of an English country house, edited by Kathryn A. Morrison. 2016, Yale University Press.ISBN 9780300148701
- Shopping parades, ed. P. Stamper, 2016, Historic England.ISBN 9781848024007
- Carscapes: The Motor Car, Architecture and Landscapes in England, Kathryn A. Morrison and John Minnis, 2012, Yale University Press.ISBN 0300187041
- Built to last? The buildings of the Northamptonshire boot and shoe industry, with Ann Bond, 2004, English Heritage.ISBN 9781848023031
- Buildings and infrastructure for the motor car, John Minnis and Kathryn A. Morrison and edited by Paul Stamper, 2016, Historic England.ISBN 9781848024502
- One hundred years of suburbia: the Aldershot estate in Wanstead 1899-1999 / Kathryn Morrison and Anne Robey. 1999, Royal Commission on the Historical Monuments of England.ISBN 978-0901616210
- 'Back to Blighty: British War Hospitals 1914-18', in W. Cocroft and P. Stamper (ed.), Legacies of the First World War, Historic England, 2018
- 'The great new shopping idea: introducing self-service in the British Isles', History of Retailing and Consumption, 2023
- The West Portal of Ivry-la-Bataille in ‘Medieval Architecture and its Intellectual Context. Studies in honour of Peter Kidson’, eds. Fernie, E & Crossley, P., A&C Black, 1990
- Curzon Street Station, New Canal Street, Birmingham / John Minnis, incorporating research by Emily Cole, Luke Jacob and Kathryn Morrison. 2015, Historic England.
- Historic England:Historic Places Investigation: Cole, E and Morrison, K 2013 Red House (formerly Framlingham Workhouse), Framlingham Castle, Suffolk. Historic England Research Report 23/2016:
