= Chester Basin =

Tidal basin in Liverpool, England

Coordinates: 53.4036°N 2.9961°W

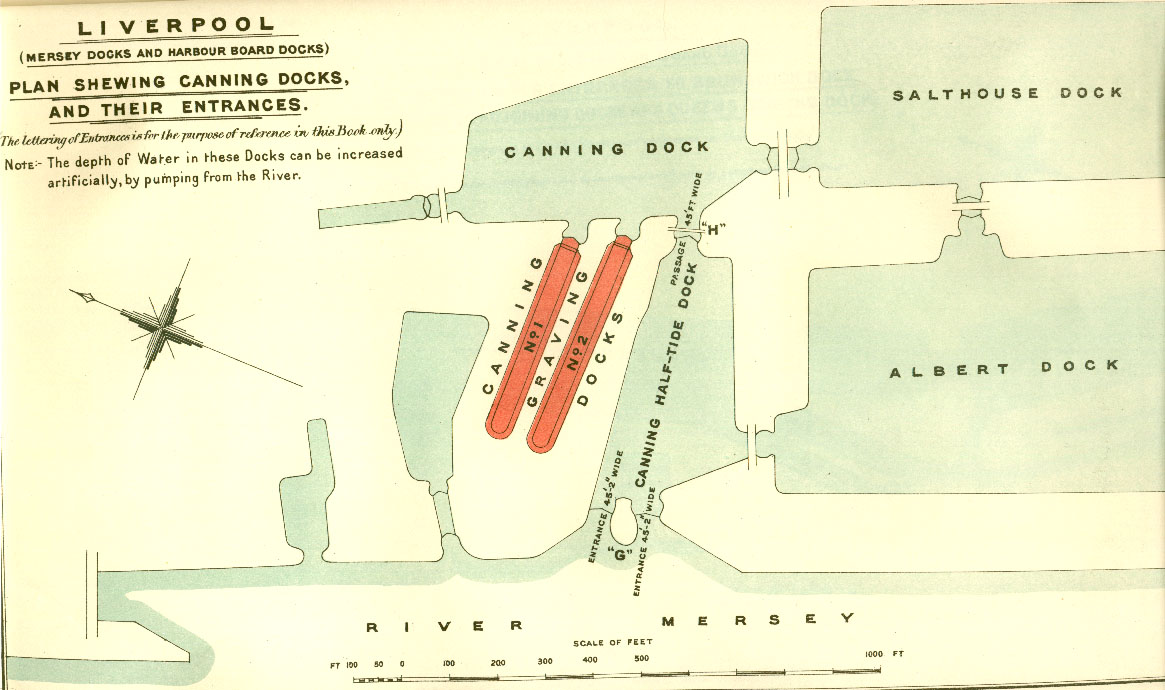
On the 1909 plan, Chester Basin is the unlabelled inlet two to the left of Canning Half-tide Dock, with Manchester Dock unlabelled in between.

Chester Basin was a tidal basin on the River Mersey, in Liverpool, England. The basin was situated between the Pier Head and Manchester Dock.

== History ==
The basin was built between 1785 and 1795, opening in 1795 as the Chester and Ellesmere Basin, and was 2,568 sq yd (2,147 m^{2}) in area. The basin was used by canal boats which had entered the river at Ellesmere Port, as well as other small craft on the Mersey, and was owned by the Shropshire Union Railways and Canal Company. The basin was filled in between 1928 and 1936, with some of the spoil excavated during the construction of the Queensway Tunnel.

In 2007, during the construction of the Liverpool Canal Link, the site was excavated. The excavation revealed various carved stones, which were identified as being from the Liverpool Town Hall of 1673.
