= Kingsway Tunnel =

Road tunnel under the River Mersey, England

Coordinates: 53.413°N 3.010°W

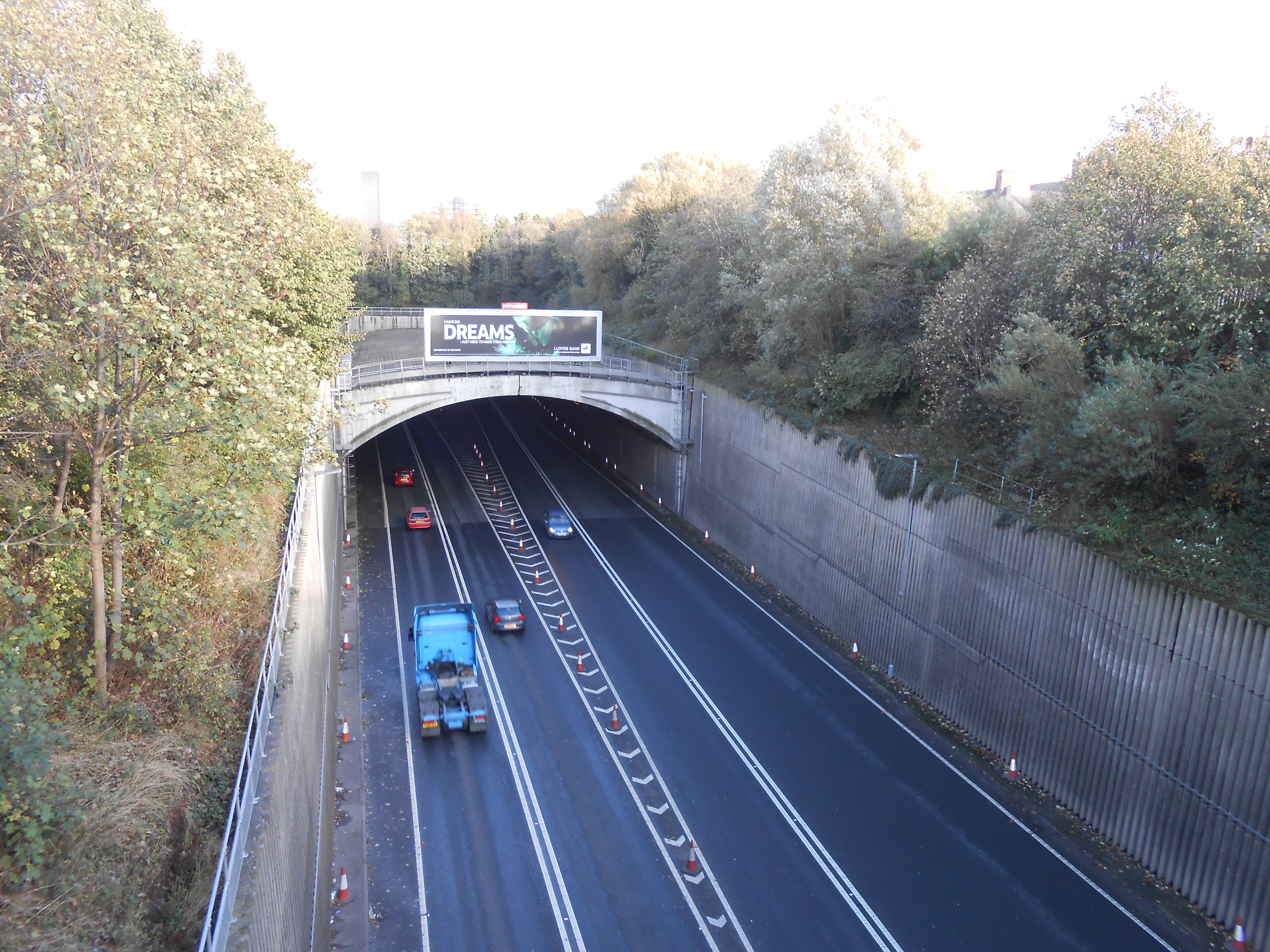
- Tunnel entrance in Wallasey
- Interactive map of Kingsway Tunnel

Overview
- Location: Merseyside, England
- Status: Active
- Route: A59 road
- Start: Liverpool, Merseyside
- End: Wallasey, Merseyside

Operation
- Constructed: 1968–1973; 53 years ago
- Opened: Southern portal: 24 June 1971; 55 years ago Northern portal: 13 February 1974; 52 years ago
- Owner: Merseytravel
- Traffic: Automotive
- Toll: £2.40 a car (£1.60 for LCR fast-tag)

Technical
- No. of lanes: 4 (2 in eastbound, 2 westbound)

Video of a journey through the tunnel

The Kingsway Tunnel (signposted as the Wallasey Tunnel or W'sey Tunnel) is a toll road tunnel under the River Mersey between Liverpool and Wallasey. It was built because the existing Queensway Tunnel was unable to cope with the rise in postwar traffic. The 1.5 mi (2.4 km) tunnel carries the A59. Locally, it is often referred to as the "new tunnel", to distinguish it from the older Queensway Tunnel (1934), which serves Birkenhead and carries public transport services.

== History ==
Annual vehicle usage of the Queensway Tunnel had exceeded 11 million by 1959, causing severe traffic congestion at peak commute times, partially as a result of low toll costs. It was evident that a significant capacity increase was required, with considerations on various bridge and tunnel schemes ultimately concluding with a second tunnel as the favoured option, funded by tolls. Legal powers were granted by Parliament in 1965 for construction of a new two-lane tunnel, approximately 1 mile downstream from the existing tunnel. A further bill for the tunnel's construction was promoted in 1967 with approval given in 1968, upon which construction started immediately.

=== Construction ===
Mersey Tunnel (Liverpool/Wallasey) &c. Act 1965
- Act of Parliament
- Parliament of the United Kingdom
- Long title: An Act to authorise the construction of a tunnel under the river Mersey between Liverpool and Wallasey, approaches to such tunnel and street works in connection therewith; to confer further powers on the lord mayor, aldermen and citizens of the city of Liverpool and the mayor, aldermen and burgesses of the county borough of Wallasey; to reconstitute the Mersey Tunnel Joint Committee; and for other purposes.
- Citation: 1965 c. xl

Dates
- Royal assent: 5 August 1965
Other legislation
Amended by	County of Merseyside Act 1980; Mersey Tunnels Order 1986 (SI 1986/297)

Status: Amended

Text of statute as originally enacted

Mersey Tunnel (Liverpool/Wallasey) Act 1968
- Act of Parliament
- Parliament of the United Kingdom
- Long title: An Act to authorise the construction of a tunnel under the river Mersey between Liverpool and Wallasey; and for other purposes.
- Citation: 1968 c. xii

Dates
- Royal assent: 30 May 1968
Other legislation
Amended by	County of Merseyside Act 1980; Mersey Tunnels Order 1986 (SI 1986/297)

Status: Amended

Text of statute as originally enacted

The project was authorised by the Mersey Tunnel (Liverpool/Wallasey) &c. Act 1965 (c. xl). Edmund Nuttall Limited. Construction took around five years to fully complete. The approach to the tunnel on the Wirral side uses the former railway cutting that carried the Seacombe branch line. It was officially opened by Queen Elizabeth II on 24 June 1971. At first, only the southernmost tunnel was open for traffic, one lane in each direction. The northernmost tunnel was completed in 1974 and opened to traffic on 13 February 1974.

=== Mersey Tunnel 10k ===
There is an annual 10k run that passes through the Kingsway Tunnel, starting in Liverpool city centre with the finish line in New Brighton. This is the only time during the year when one can travel through the tunnel on foot. In 2024, more than 2,000 people registered to take part in the event.

== Operations ==
Kingsway comprises identical twin tunnels. Each has two 12 ft (3.7 m) lanes. They carry on average 45,000 vehicles a day (almost 16.4 million per year). As of May 2026, a single car journey through the tunnel cost £2.40. Staffed and automatic tollbooths are located on the Wallasey side. Of the two tunnels crossing the River Mersey, Kingsway is the only one able to take heavy goods vehicles (HGVs).

In a study following the fire in the Mont Blanc Tunnel in 1999, inspectors from the European Union rated the Kingsway Tunnel as "good", one of fourteen to receive that rating in Europe.

Over 75 miles (120 km) of wiring was installed in the tunnel as part of a 2016 upgrade to the lighting, which saw the tunnel fitted with more energy efficient and longer-lasting LED lights.

== See also ==
- Mersey Tunnels Police
- M53 motorway

Next crossing upstream	River Mersey	Next crossing downstream
Queensway Tunnel	Kingsway Tunnel	Liverpool Bay
