= Manchester Dock (disambiguation) =

Manchester Dock and similar can mean:

- "Manchester Docks" is another name for Salford Docks in Greater Manchester, England
- Manchester Dock (Liverpool), an old dock (now filled in) in Liverpool, England
- Manchester Dock, a dock in Richmond, Virginia, United States
