= Monument to the Mersey Tunnel =

Monument in Birkenhead, Merseyside, England

Coordinates: 53.38843°N 3.01475°W

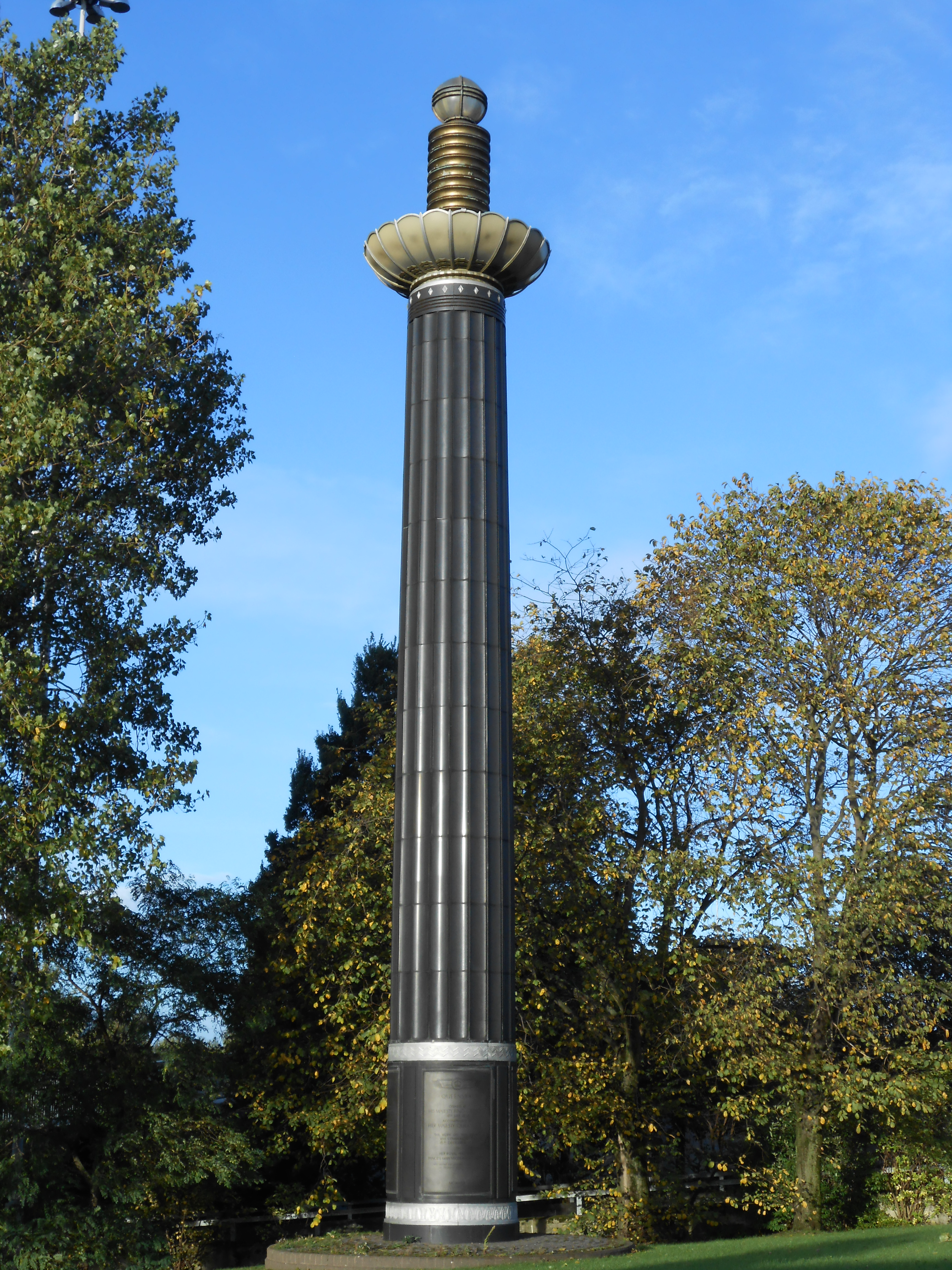
Monument to the Mersey Tunnel

The Monument to the Mersey Tunnel stands in Chester Street, Birkenhead, Wirral, Merseyside, England, near the western entrance to the Queensway Tunnel, one of the two Mersey Tunnels carrying roads under the River Mersey between Liverpool and the Wirral. It consists of shaft with a light on the top, and originally had the dual purpose of being a monument and of illuminating the entrance to the tunnel. It was designed by Herbert James Rowse, and was one of a pair, but the monument that was on the Liverpool side of the River Mersey no longer exists, however a modern replica is now being installed. The monument is recorded in the National Heritage List for England as a designated Grade II listed building.

== History ==
Queensway Tunnel, the first road tunnel under the River Mersey linking Liverpool with the Wirral, was built between 1925 and 1933. Two identical structures were designed by Herbert James Rowse to be placed near the entrances to the tunnel, one on each side of the River Mersey. They had two purposes, both to act as monuments, and to illuminate the area around the entrances to the tunnels. Their design was approved in June 1933, and this was exhibited at the Royal Academy Exhibition in 1934. The monuments were built by McAlpine and Sons, and the decorative metal work was carried out by H. J. Lloyd of H. H. Martyn & Co. The construction of the monuments was complete by the date of the official opening of the tunnel by King George V on 18 July 1934. The Birkenhead entrance to the tunnel was redesigned in the 1960s, and the monument was moved to its present position between carriageways. The original monument on the Liverpool side no longer exists after it was placed into storage and subsequently lost or destroyed, however a replica has recently been created and erected on the Liverpool side

== Description ==
The monument stands on a white ashlar base. It consists of a shaft about 18.3 metres (60 ft) high surmounted by a lighting bowl. The core of the shaft is reinforced concrete, which is overlaid with fluted and polished black granite. The lighting bowl is in gilded bronze and glass. The shaft tapers, and is also slightly curved "to correct the optical illusion of being less in diameter in the centre than at the top of the shaft". There are two bands around the shaft decorated with chevrons and acanthus. At the top of the shaft is a fluted glass bowl. Arising from this is a ribbed cap bearing a spherical-shaped lamp. On the base of the shaft is an inscription reading as follows.

QUEENSWAY
OPENED BY
HIS MAJESTY KING GEORGE V
18TH JULY 1934
ACCOMPANIED BY
HER MAJESTY QUEEN MARY
THE WORK ON THIS TUNNEL
WAS COMMENCED ON
16TH DECEMBER
BY
HER ROYAL HIGHNESS
PRINCESS MARY VISCOUNTESS LASCELLES
who started the pneumatic boring drills
at St George's Dock Liverpool
MCMXXXIV

Also inscribed on the base of the shaft are names of members and officers of the Mersey Tunnel Joint Committee, and the engineers, contractors, architect, and valuer who were responsible for the tunnel.

== Appraisal ==
The monument was designated a Grade II listed building on 10 August 1992. Grade II is the lowest of the three grades of listing and is applied to "buildings of national importance and special interest". The National Recording Project comments that it now "merely serves as a memorial".

== See also ==
- Listed buildings in Birkenhead
