= Liverpool Canal Link =

Section of canal linking the Leeds to Liverpool canal to Liverpool's South Docks

Coordinates: 53.405°N 2.997°W

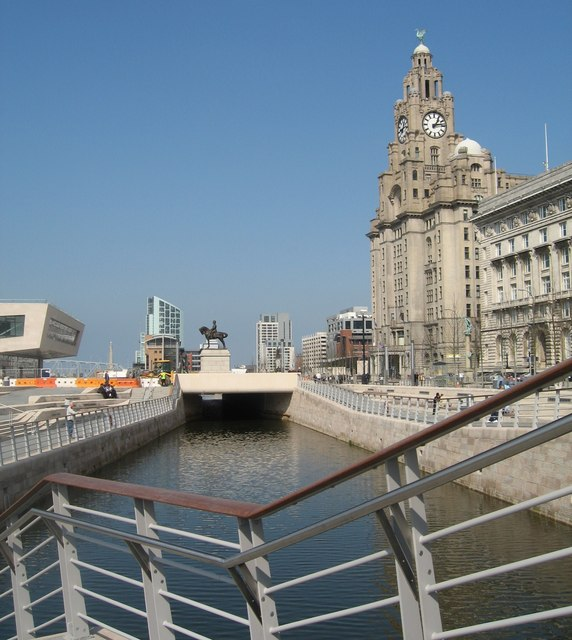
Liverpool Canal Link passing through the Pier Head

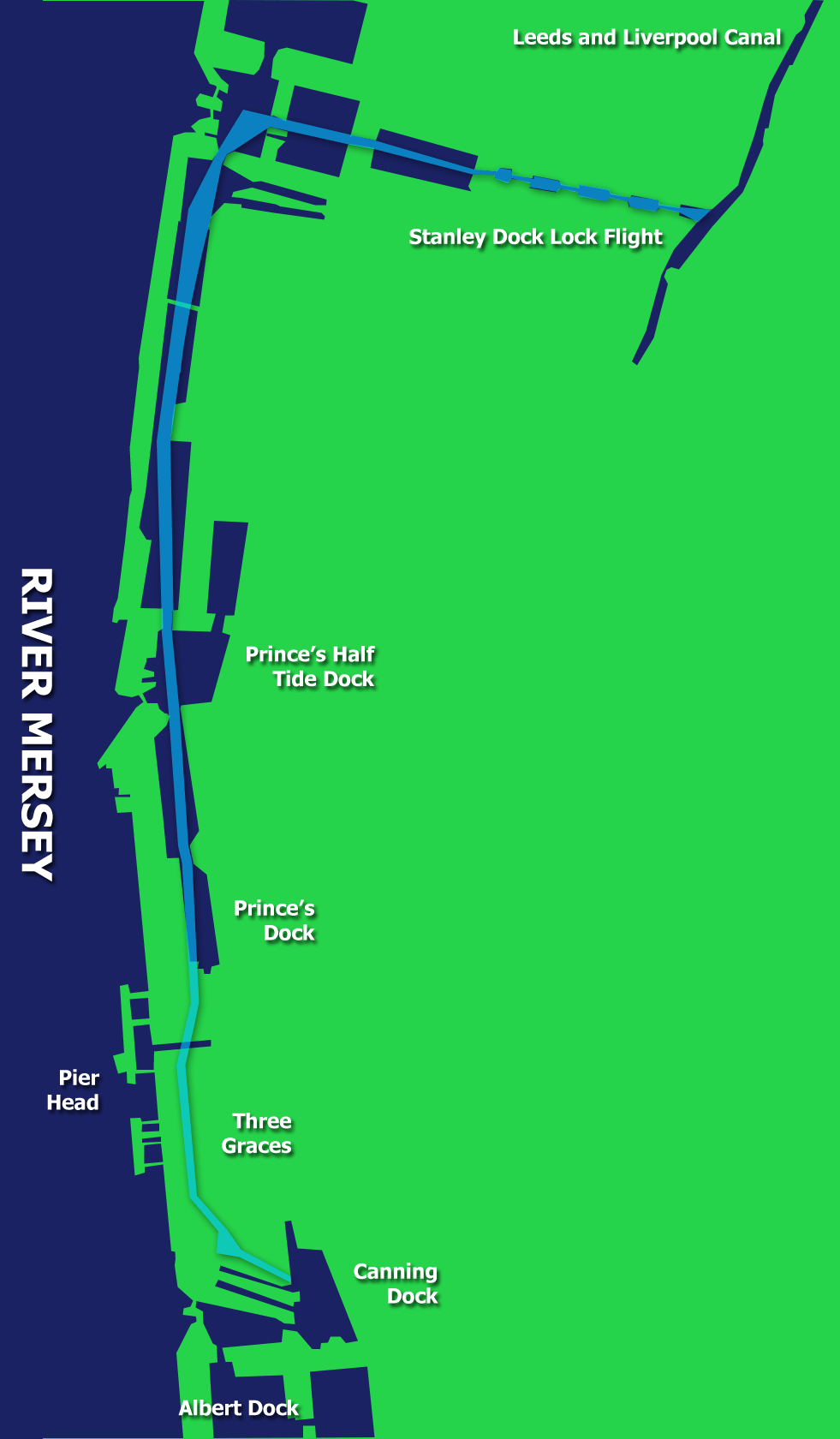
A map of the projected route of the canal

The Liverpool Canal Link is an English waterway link that connects the Leeds and Liverpool Canal, at the Liverpool Pier Head, to the city's South Docks. It cost £22m and was opened in March 2009. The new link adds 1.4 miles (2.3 km) of navigable waterway to the canal system.

== History ==
It was intended that the Leeds and Liverpool Canal would be linked to the docks in Liverpool. It was only in 1846, 30 years after the canal's completion, that the canal was directly linked to the docks via the Stanley Dock Branch. Georges Dock was filled in at the beginning of the 20th century to allow the building of the Liver Building, Cunard Building and the Mersey Docks and Harbour Board Building, now known as "the Three Graces". This meant the North and South Docks were no longer directly linked. Boats wishing to travel from the North Docks to the South Docks had to go via the River Mersey.

== Planning ==
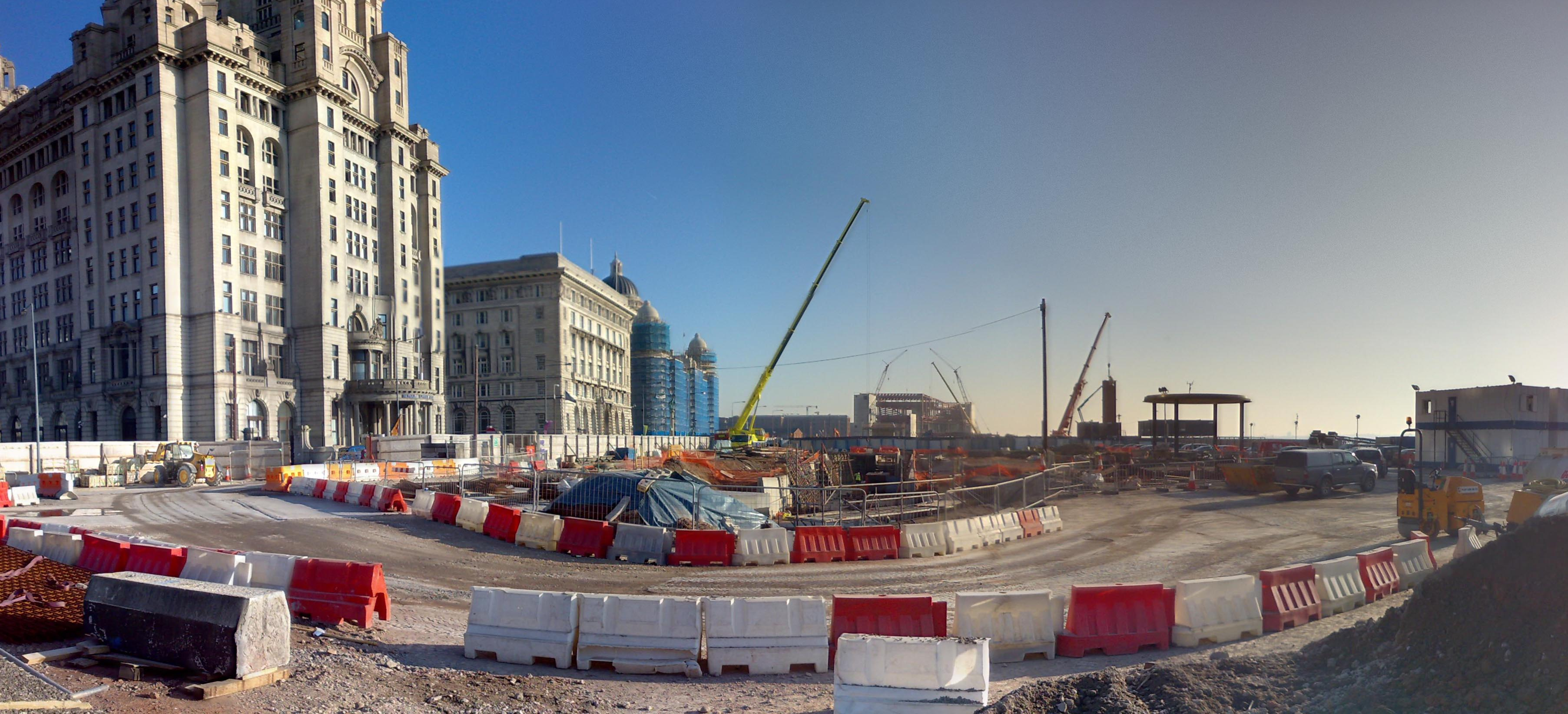
The new canal link heading south past the Liver Building

By 2000 there were several new canal projects such as the renovation of the Huddersfield Narrow Canal, the Ribble Link and Rochdale Canal. The Waterways Regeneration Task Force, part of British Waterways, took over the South Docks from English Partnerships. The Task Force approached the Liverpool City Council's Liverpool City Vision with the suggestion of linking the Leeds and Liverpool Canal to the South Docks by building a new waterway across Pier Head.

Four routes were proposed and after public consultation in 2001 a route was chosen. The winning route was across the front of the Three Graces at the Pier Head. Feasibility work was funded by the North West Regional Development Agency, British Waterways Regeneration Task Force and a detailed proposal drawn up during 2003. Funding for the work came from the NWRDA, (50%) with the rest coming from Europe via the ERDF Objective 1 programme. The original estimate was £17 million.

After some changes to the plans following the failed Fourth Grace project and objections by English Heritage a new plan was drawn up by March 2005 which took account of the new Museum of Liverpool. Planning permission was applied for in August 2005 and granted in early 2006.

== Route ==
The chosen route includes two new locks, open channels, tunnels and culverts. Two new highway bridges were built, as well as flow control structures and utility diversions.

The docks between Salisbury Dock and Prince's Half-Tide Dock were filled in with just a small drainage channel remaining. Following dredging in the 1990s, this section was in water and navigable. Further dredging took place at the northern edge of the Trafalgar Dock infill.

Between Trafalgar Dock and the Prince's Half-Tide Dock a 21-foot-wide (6.4 m) channel through Trafalgar Dock and the northern end of West Waterloo Dock was built, with a new crossing at the dock passage between Trafalgar and West Waterloo Dock. The channel from West Waterloo Dock to Prince's Dock was dredged and the level of the docks reduced.

From the northern end of Prince's Dock through to the start of the Pier Head area a new fixed bridge and lock was built at Prince's Dock. Prince's Dock Footbridge was raised to allow boats to pass underneath and the bridge approaches have been landscaped. A new culvert across land known as Plot 7 was built along with another new culvert beneath St. Nicholas Place and the cruise liner facility.

The final section of the canal link commences south of the Floating Roadway Basin, crosses the Pier Head and terminates at Canning Dock. 500 metres (550 yd) of new canal was built along with associated bridge crossings and a lock structure. A new basin was built at Mann Island along with extensive landscaping for the general public.

== Construction ==
In 2007, during the construction of the canal link, the sites of Chester Basin and Manchester Dock were excavated. The excavation revealed various carved stones in the area of Chester Basin, which were identified as being from the Liverpool Town Hall of 1673. The excavation was shown in a Time Team Special, broadcast on Channel 4 on Monday 21 April 2008.

The canal link was completed in December 2008 with the Pier Head section finished earlier in September. After a period of testing and commissioning the canal link opened on 25 March 2009.

== Images ==
Views from north to south (Princes Dock to Canning Dock)

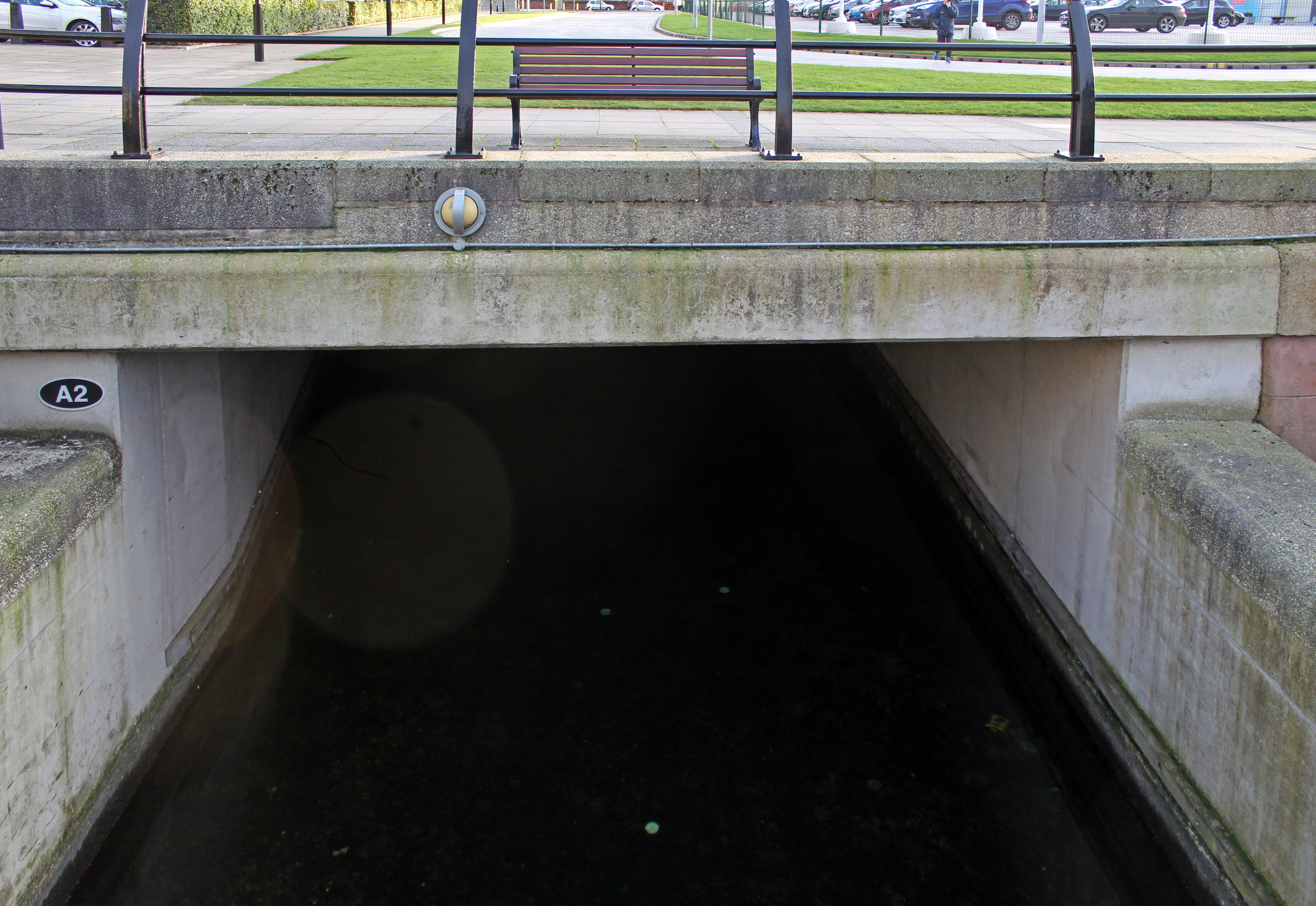
Northern portal of St Nicholas tunnel in Princes Dock

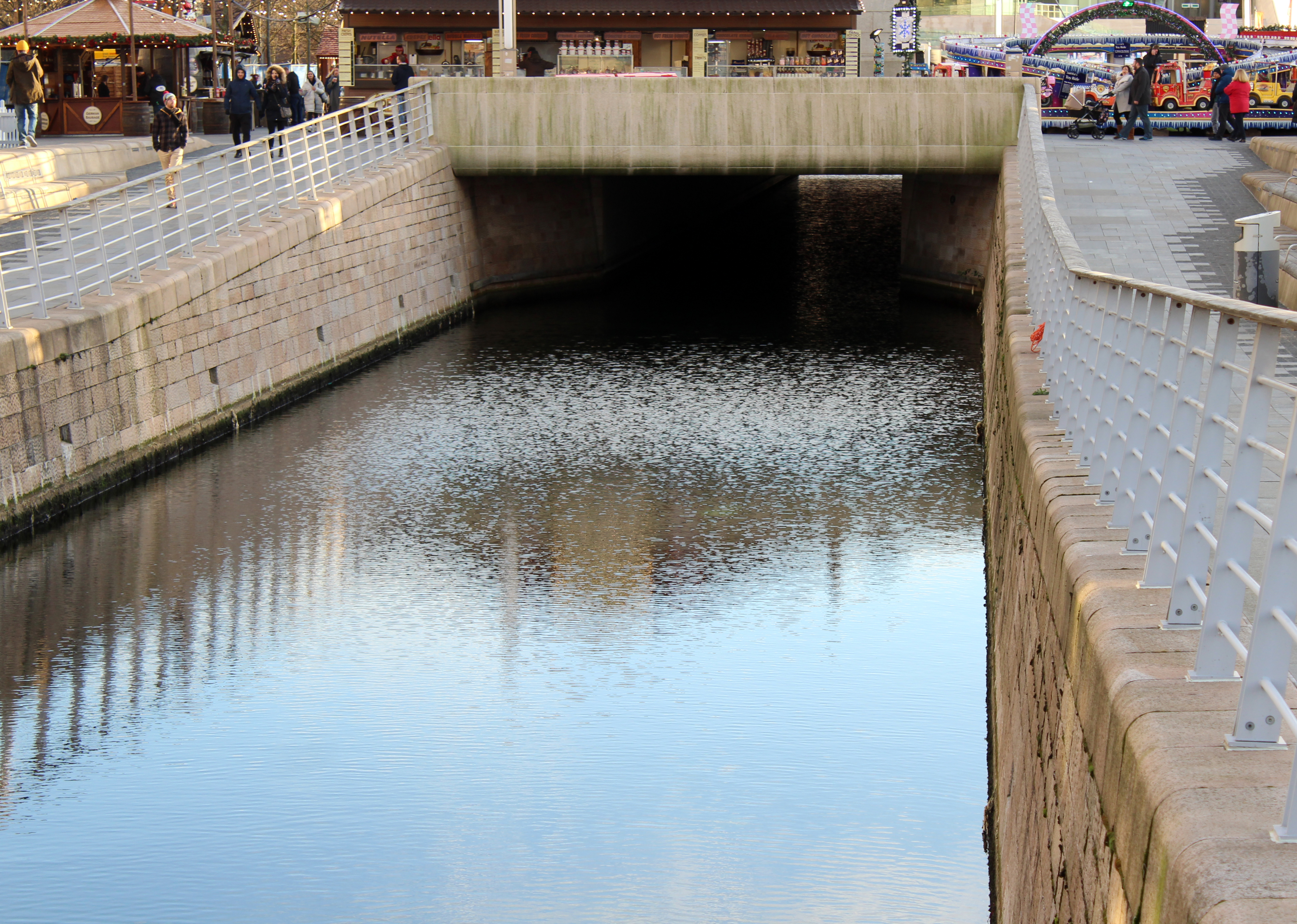
Liver Basin towards Cunard Tunnel; Museum Basin lies beyond

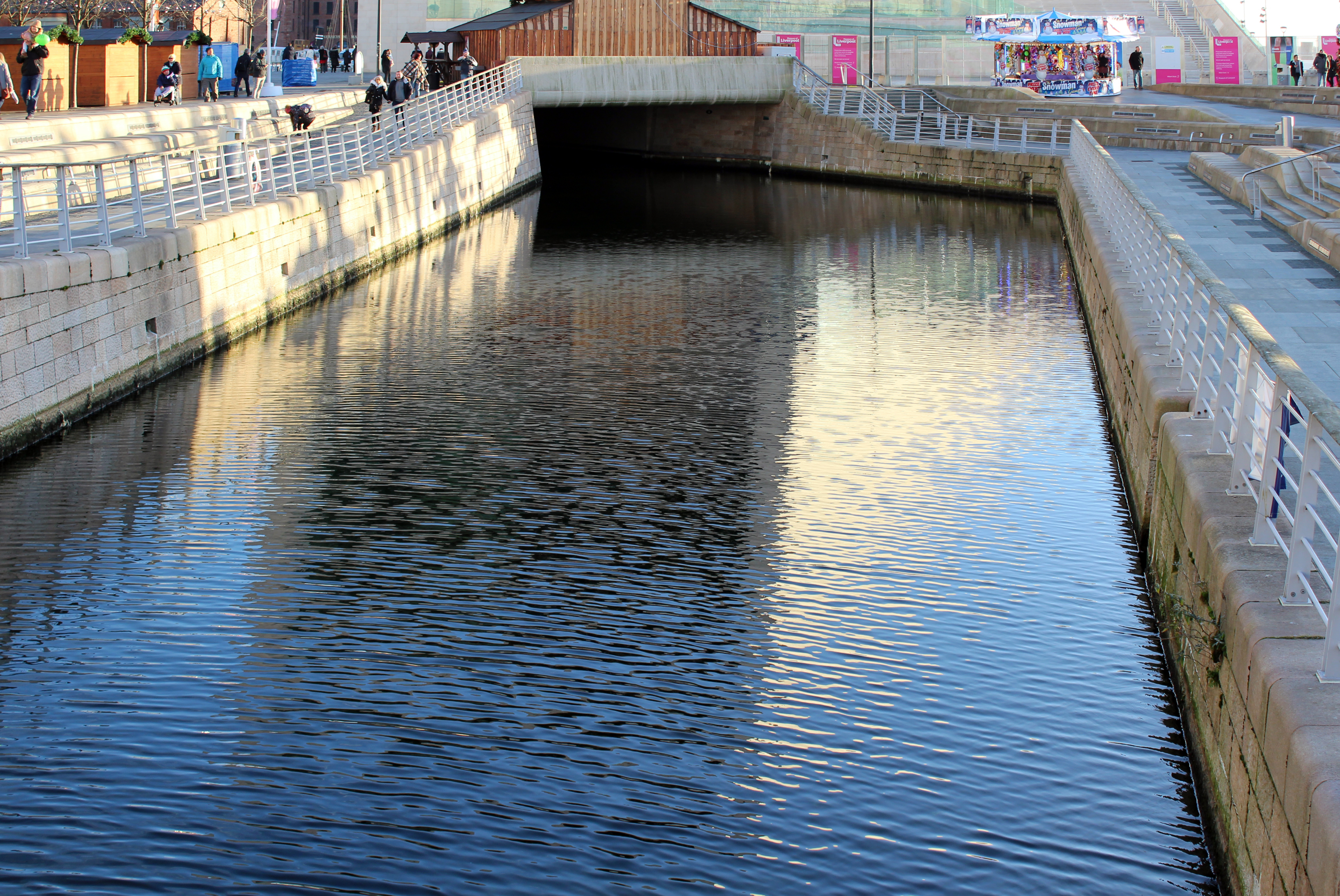
Museum Basin towards Museum Tunnel

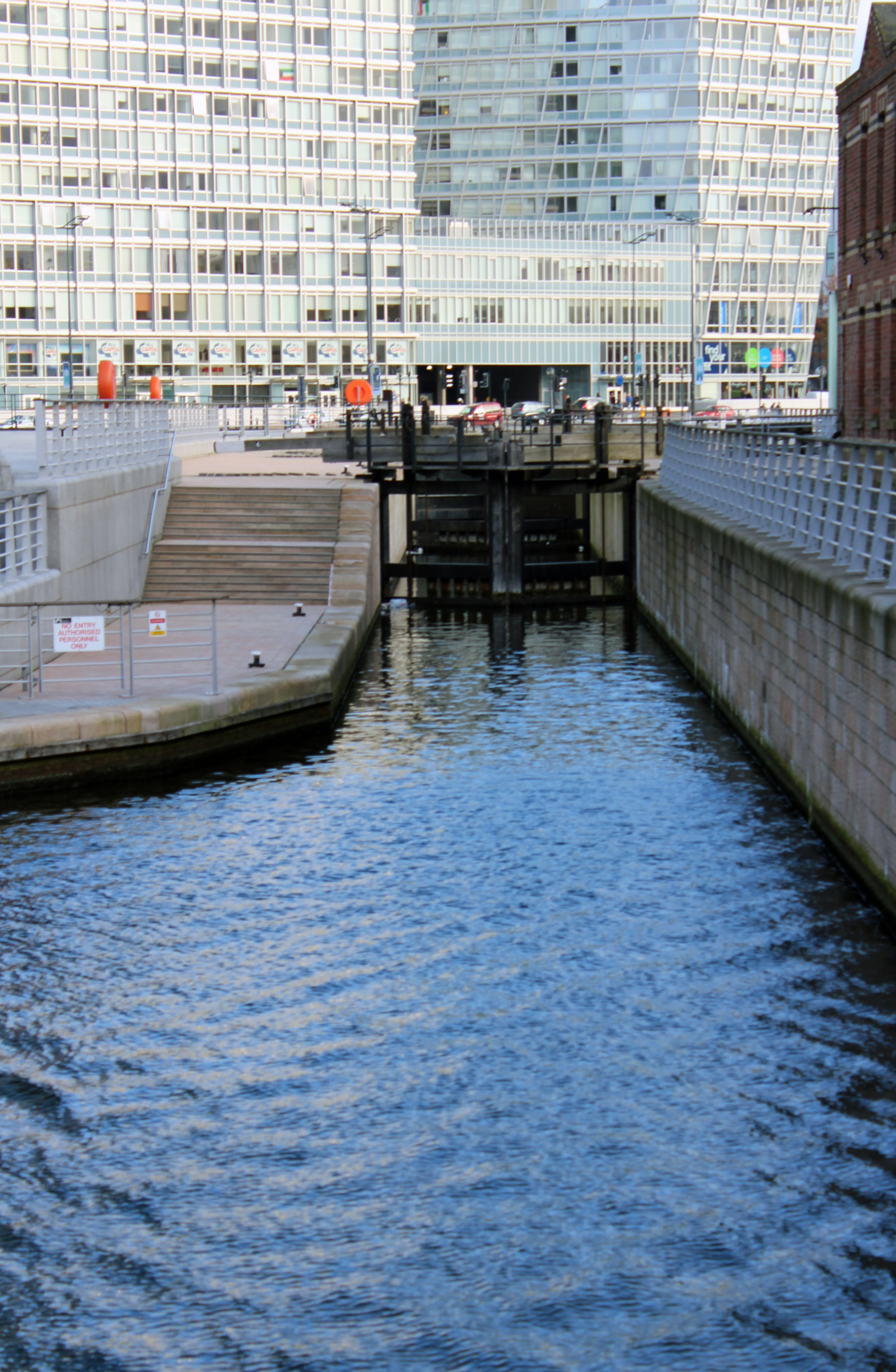
Mann Island lock, the exit from the canal into Canning Dock
Views from south to north (Canning Dock to Princes Dock)

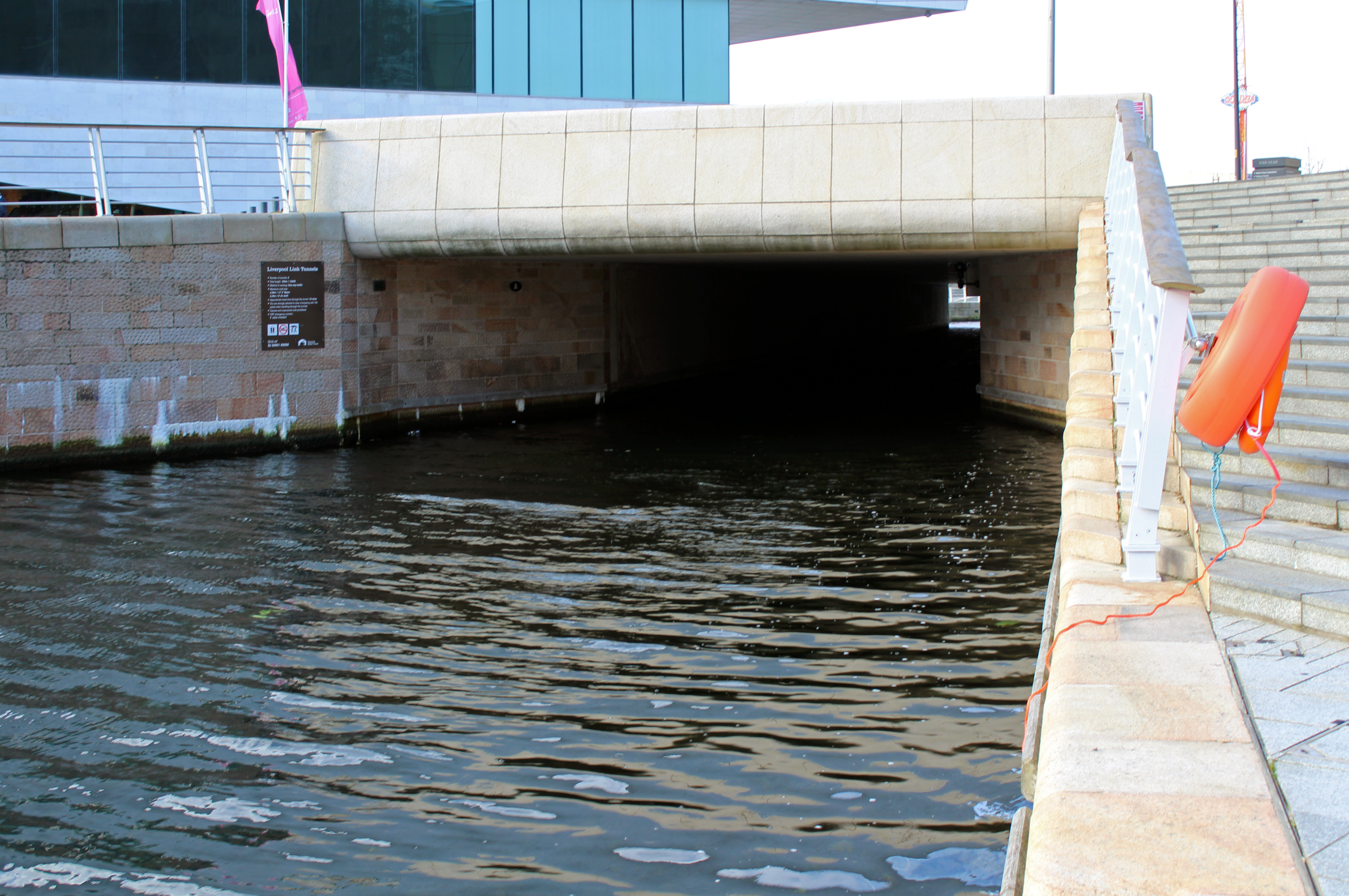
Museum Tunnel from Mann Island Basin

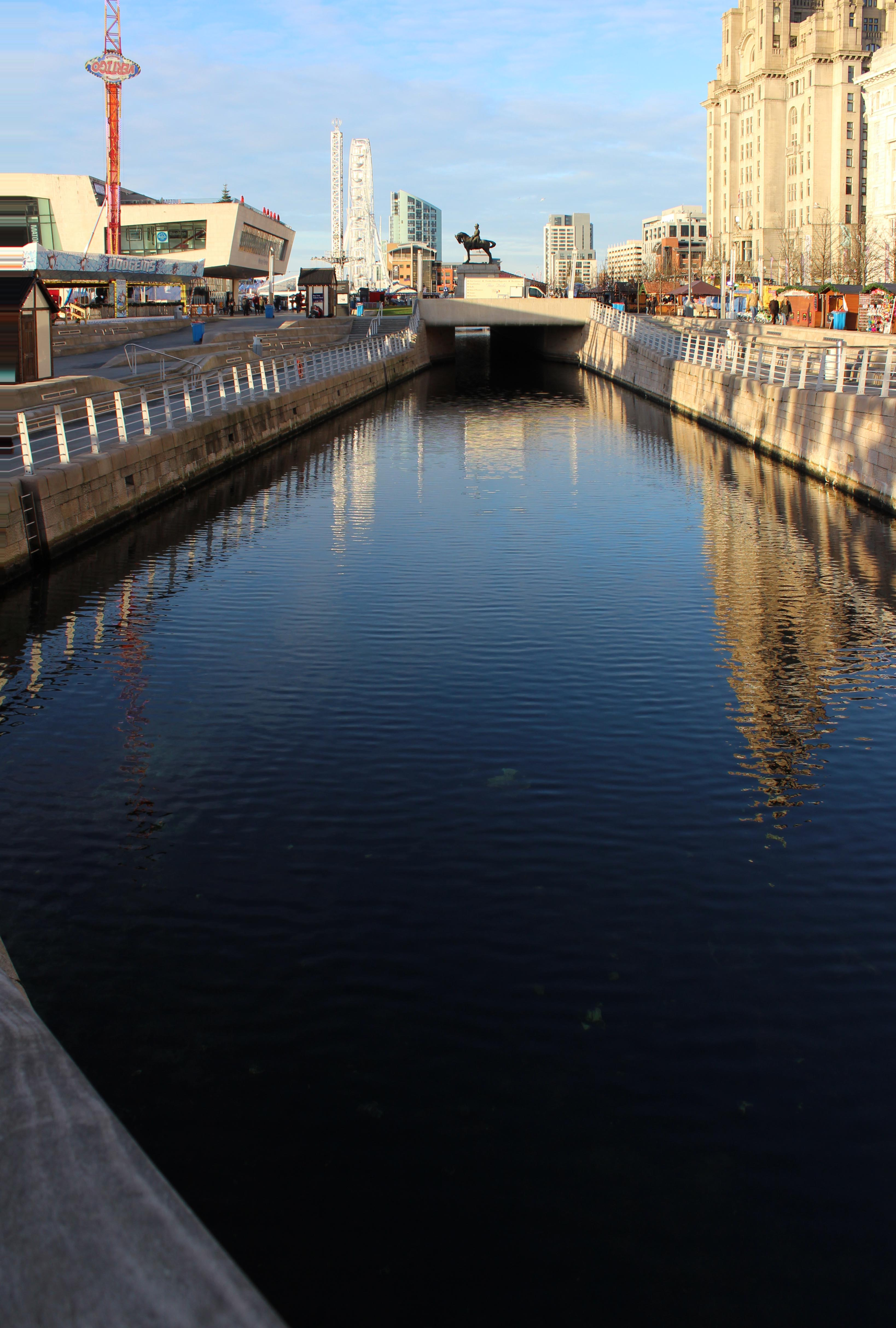
From Museum tunnel into Museum Basin and towards Cunard Tunnel

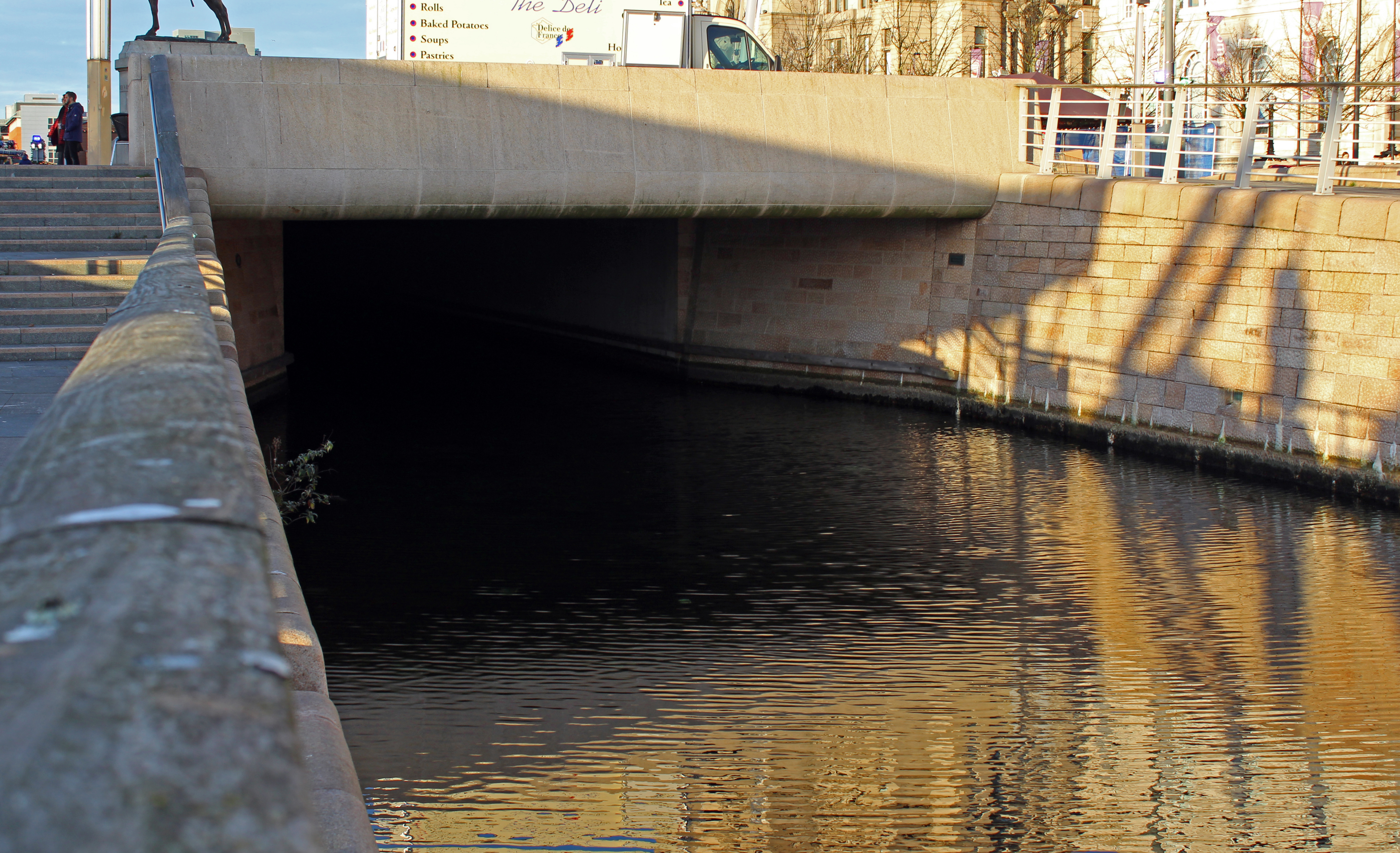
Southern portal of Cunard Tunnel, from the west bank

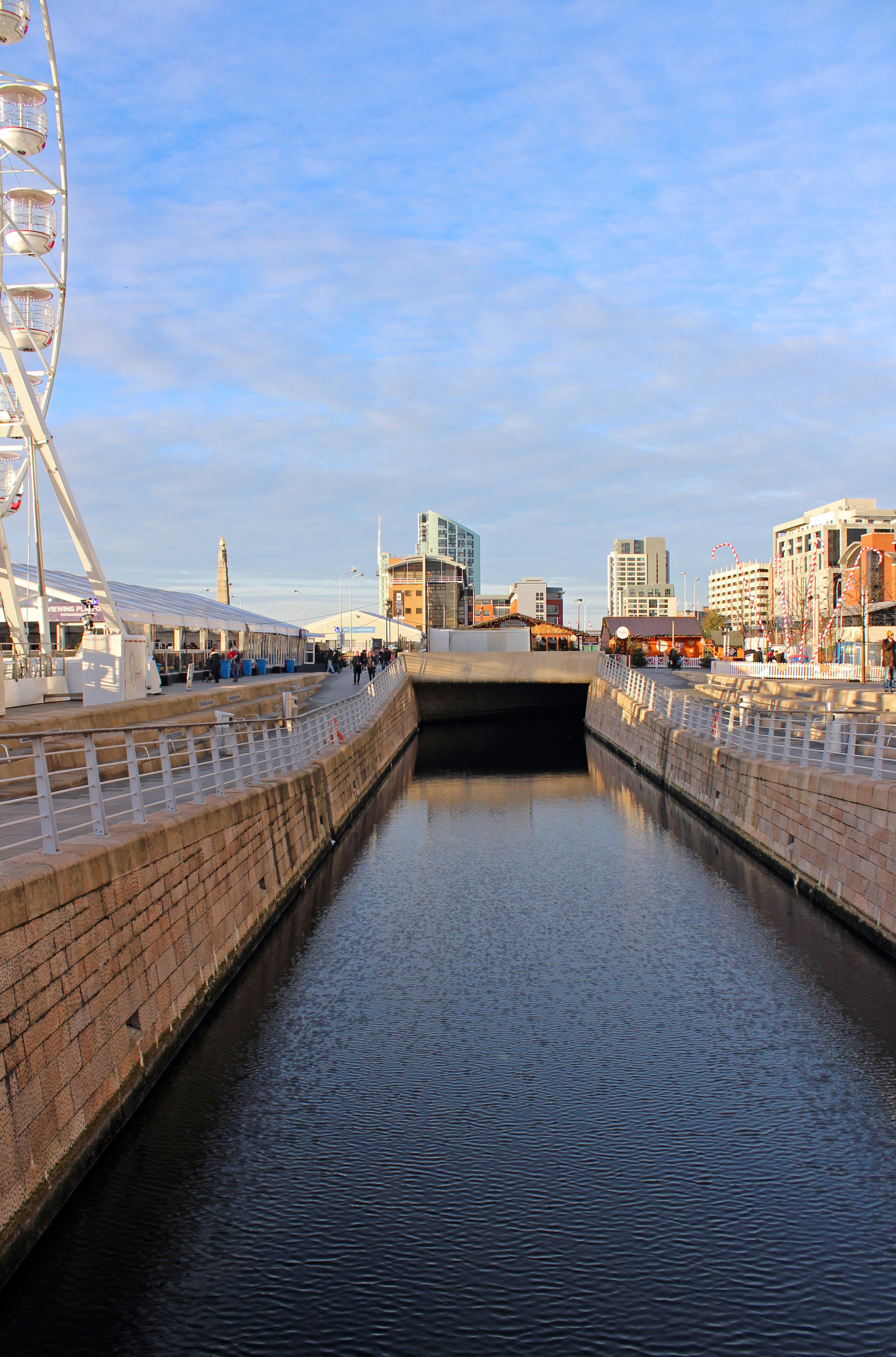
Liver Basin towards St Nicholas Tunnel

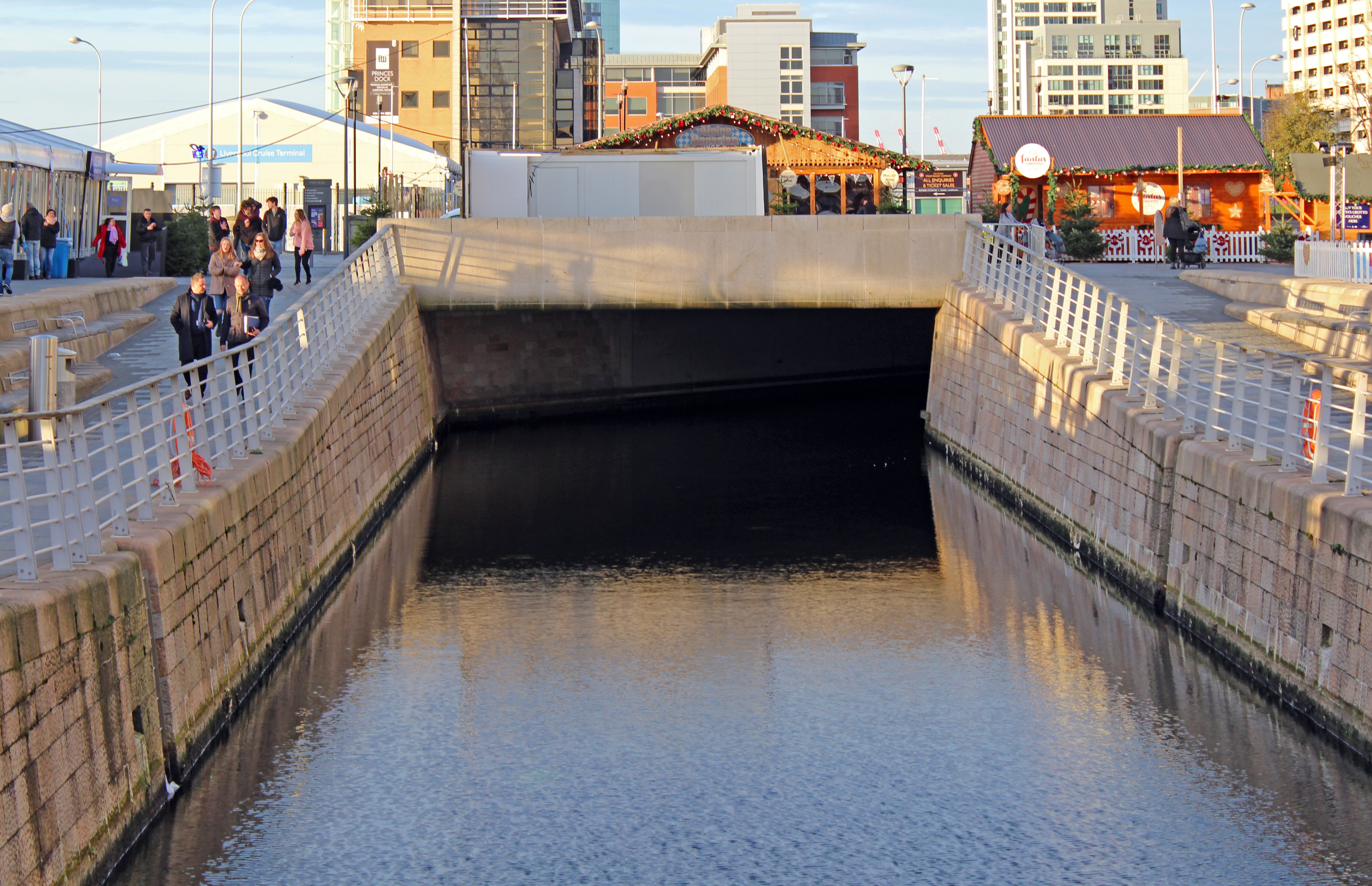
The southern portal of St Nicholas Tunnel; the link veers to the north under St Nicholas Place here

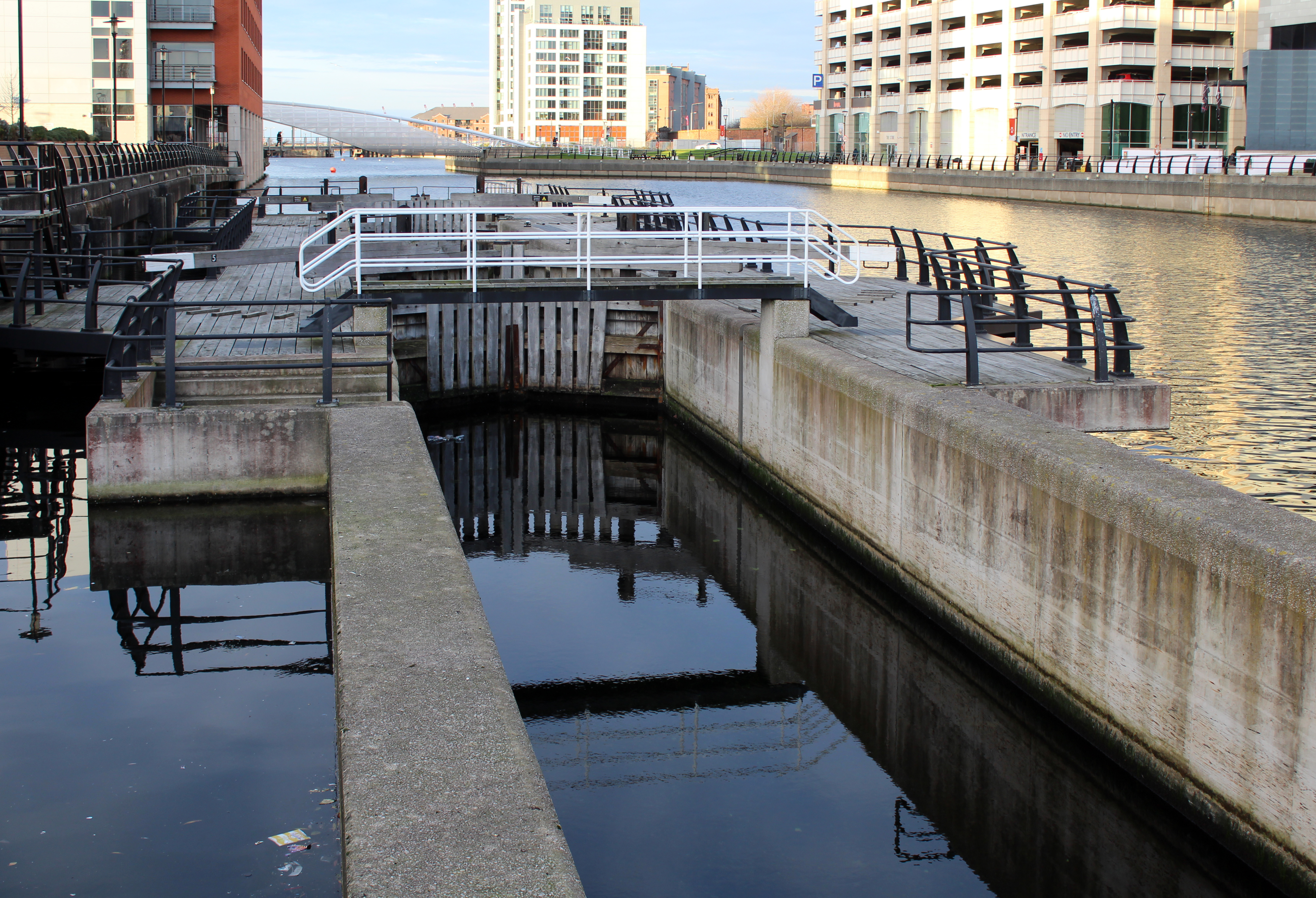
Entry into Princes Dock is via this lock

== See also ==
- Canals of Great Britain
- Leeds and Liverpool Canal
