= Mersey Tunnels =

Road and rail tunnels that connect Liverpool to Wirral under the River Mersey

- Headquarters: Liverpool
- Area served: Liverpool, Wallasey, Birkenhead
- Parent: Merseytravel; Liverpool City Region Combined Authority
- Website: merseytunnels.co.uk

Mersey Tunnels Act 2004
- Act of Parliament
- Parliament of the United Kingdom
- Long title: An Act to amend provisions of the County of Merseyside Act 1980 relating to the levying, revision and application of tolls for use of the Mersey Tunnels and to amend that Act for other purposes.
- Citation: 2004 c. ii

Dates
- Royal assent: 1 July 2004
Other legislation
Amends	County of Merseyside Act 1980

Text of statute as originally enacted

The Mersey Tunnels connect the city of Liverpool with Wirral, under the River Mersey. There are three tunnels: the Mersey Railway Tunnel, opened 1886, and two road tunnels, the Queensway Tunnel, opened 1934 and the Kingsway Tunnel, opened 1971. The railway tunnel and Queensway road tunnel connect central Liverpool with Birkenhead, while the Kingsway road tunnel runs to Wallasey.

The road tunnels are owned and operated by Merseytravel, and have their own police force, the Mersey Tunnels Police. In 1967 it was announced that the "Mersey Tunnel Scheme" was now operational. The scheme comprised what was claimed to be the largest closed circuit television system for traffic control outside North America, and featured a bank of 22 CRT monitors.

== See also ==
- Architecture of Liverpool
- Monument to the Mersey Tunnel
