= Queensway Tunnel =

Road tunnel running under the River Mersey connecting Liverpool and Wirral

Coordinates: 53.4009°N 3.0031°W

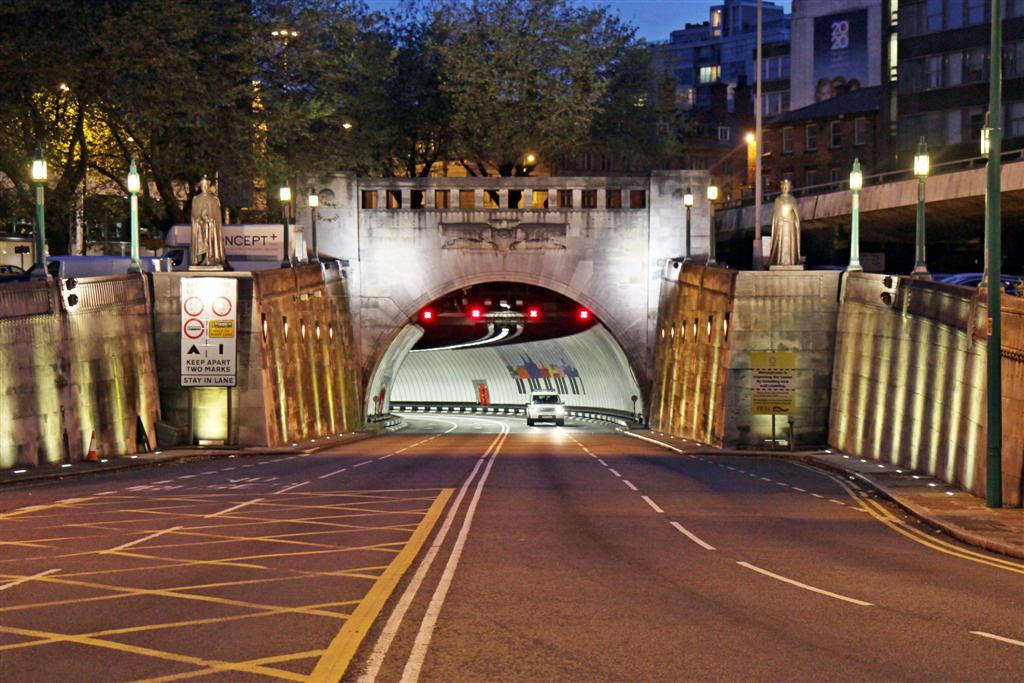
- The Liverpool entrance to the Queensway Tunnel
- Interactive map of Queensway Tunnel

Overview
- Location: Merseyside, England
- Status: Active
- Route: Queens Way
- Start: Liverpool, Merseyside
- End: Birkenhead, Merseyside

Operation
- Constructed: 1925–1934; 92 years ago
- Opened: 18 July 1934; 92 years ago
- Owner: Merseytravel
- Traffic: Automotive
- Toll: £2.40 for a car (£1.60 for LCR residents using T-Flow)

Technical
- No. of lanes: 4 (2 northbound, 2 southbound)

The Queensway Tunnel (signposted as the Birkenhead Tunnel or B'head Tunnel) is a road tunnel under the River Mersey, in the north west of England, between Liverpool and Birkenhead. Locally, it is often referred to as the "old tunnel", to distinguish it from the newer Kingsway Tunnel (1971), which serves Wallasey and the M53 motorway traffic. At 2.13 miles (3.43 km) in length, it is the longest road tunnel in the UK.

== History ==
=== Planning and construction ===
The first tunnel under the River Mersey was for the Mersey Railway in 1886. The first tunnel crossing was proposed in 1825, and again in 1827. A report in 1830 rejected the road tunnel due to concerns about building damage.

Mersey Tunnel Act 1925
- Act of Parliament
- Parliament of the United Kingdom
- Long title: An Act to authorise the construction of a tunnel under the River Mersey between Liverpool and Birkenhead and for other purposes.
- Citation: 15 & 16 Geo. 5. c. cx

Dates
- Royal assent: 7 August 1925

Text of statute as originally enacted

During the 1920s there were concerns about the long queues of cars and lorries at the Mersey Ferry terminal, so once royal assent for the Mersey Tunnel Act 1925 (15 & 16 Geo. 5. c. cx) was received, construction of the first Mersey road tunnel started in 1925, to a design by consulting engineer Sir Basil Mott. Mott supervised the construction in association with John Brodie, who, as City Engineer of Liverpool, had co-ordinated the feasibility studies made by consultant Engineers Mott, Hay and Anderson. The main contractor was Edmund Nuttall. In 1928 the two pilot tunnels met to within less than 25 millimetres (1.0 in). Construction work continued, and in 1930 Brian Colquhoun was appointed Resident Engineer. From 1933 to 1936 Colquhoun was redesignated Resident Engineer-in-Charge.

More than 1.2 million tons of rock, gravel, and clay were excavated; some of it was used to build Otterspool Promenade. Of the 1,700 men who worked on the tunnel during the nine years of its construction, 17 were killed.

=== Opening ===
At the time of its opening in 1934, it was the longest road tunnel in the world, a title it held for 14 years until the opening of the Vielha Tunnel in Catalonia, Spain, in 1948, though it remained the longest underwater tunnel as of 1955. The tunnel, which cost a total of £8 million, was opened on 18 July 1934 by King George V; the opening ceremony was watched by 200,000 people. At the time it was known as the eighth wonder of the world.

=== Operation ===
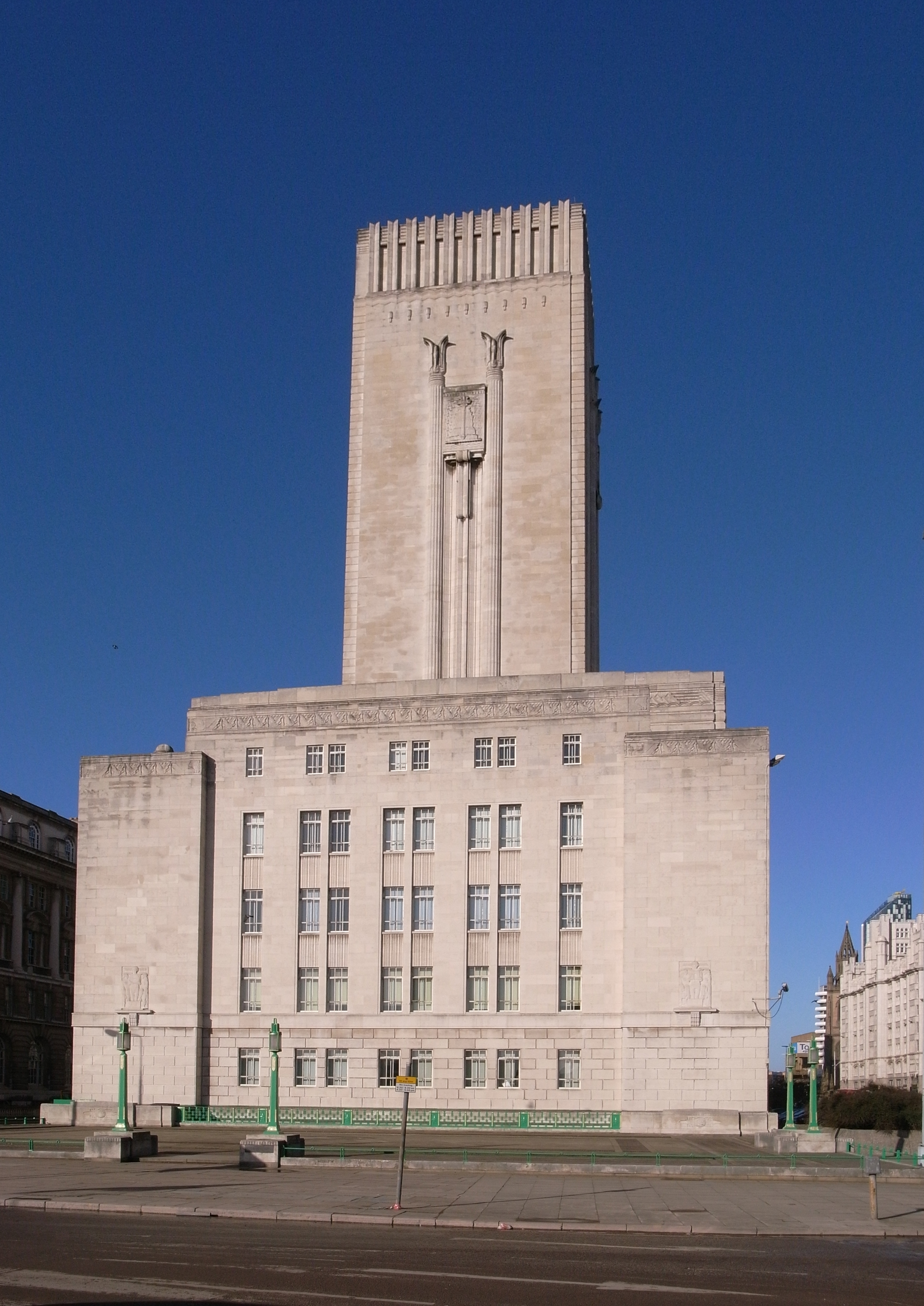
George's Dock ventilation and control station, Pier Head

By the 1960s, traffic volume had increased, and, in 1971, the Kingsway Tunnel opened to relieve congestion.

In 1984, the lighting system underwent a major upgrade to improve visibility and safety, as the low light levels were contributing to an increased risk of accidents. The outdated wall-mounted lights were replaced with modern overhead fixtures. Rather than using traditional scaffolding, double-decker buses were purchased and modified by removing their roofs, allowing workers to move easily along the tunnel's length. These buses also provided on-board toilet and catering facilities. The £1 million scheme also included re-cladding and a repaint of the tunnel. The upgraded lighting was officially switched on in June 1984. Alongside the lighting upgrade were also resurfacing works, costing around £500,000. On 17 July 1994, the tunnel was closed for the day and was used for pedestrians only to celebrate its 60th anniversary. Official estimates put the number of people walking through the tunnel in excess of 20,000, while a concert in the tunnel had to be abandoned due to fears of crushing.

In April 2004 construction began on seven emergency refuges below the road deck, each capable of holding 180 people, as part of a £9 million project to bring the tunnel into line with the highest European safety standards. Each refuge is 21 metres (69 ft) long and 3 metres (9.8 ft) wide, accessible from the main tunnel walls. The refuges have fire resistant doors, ramps for wheelchair access, a supply of bottled water, a toilet, and a video link to the Mersey Tunnels Police control room. All seven refuges are linked by a walkway below the road surface, with exits at the Liverpool and Birkenhead ends.

In 2012 the tunnel was refurbished, with 5,999 added panels – ceramic steel cladding replacing the old plastic corrugated wall cladding to improve lighting and to give the tunnel a 21st century look.

== Design and facilities ==
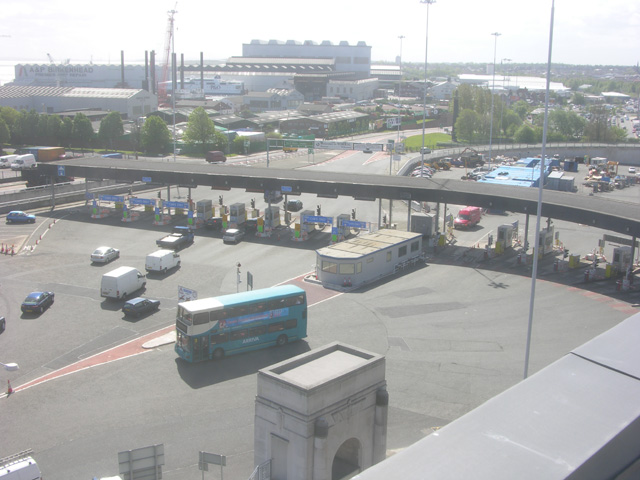
Toll booths at the Birkenhead entrance to the Queensway Tunnel

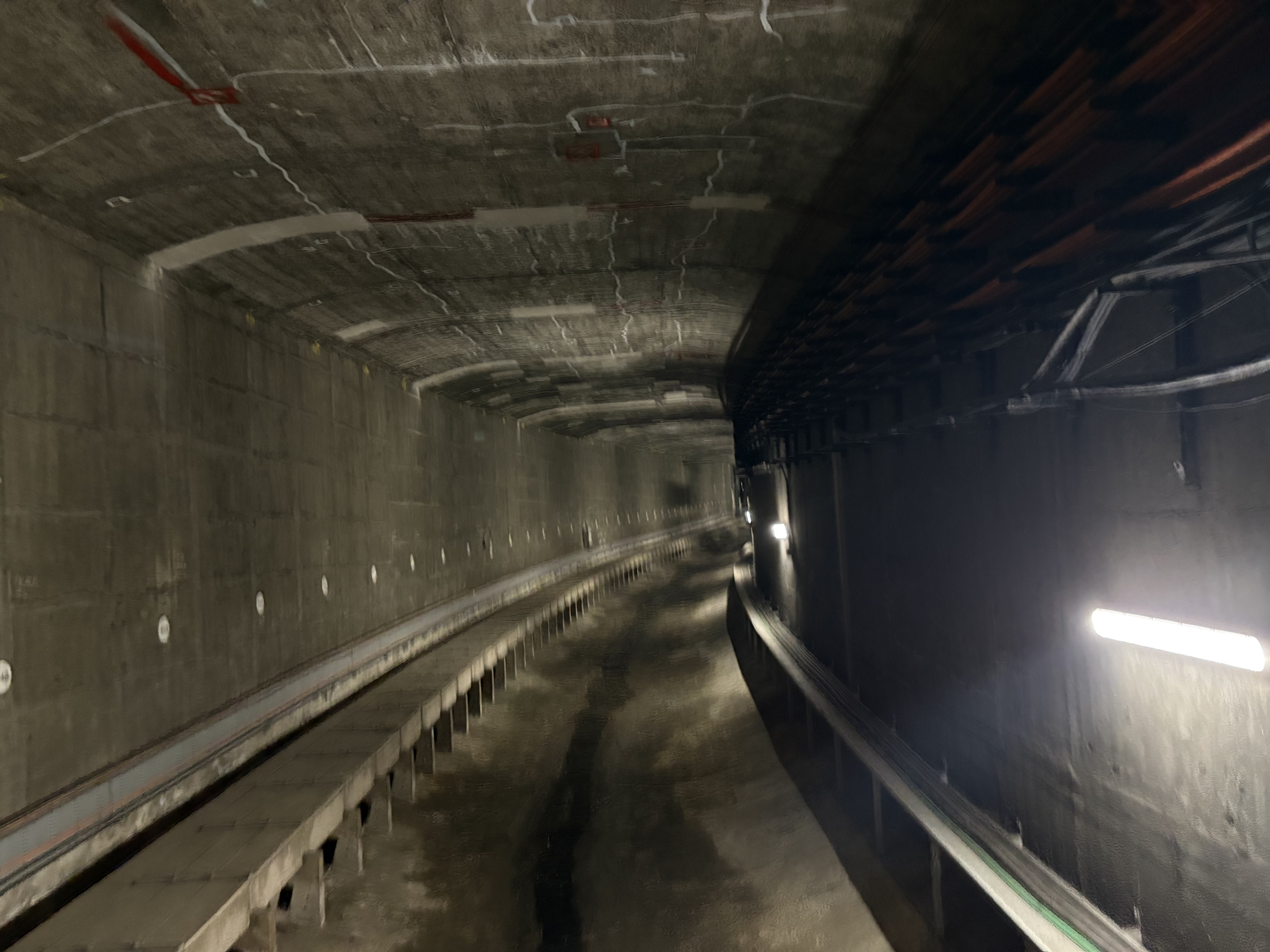
The lower deck of the tunnel

The tunnel is 2.13 miles (3.43 km) long. It contains a single carriageway of four lanes, two in each direction. A lower deck, originally intended as a tramway, is used for ventilation and emergency refuges.

The tunnel entrances, toll booths and ventilation building exteriors were designed by architect Herbert James Rowse, who is frequently but incorrectly credited with the whole civil engineering project. Their decoration is by Edmund Thompson. These are Grade II listed buildings.

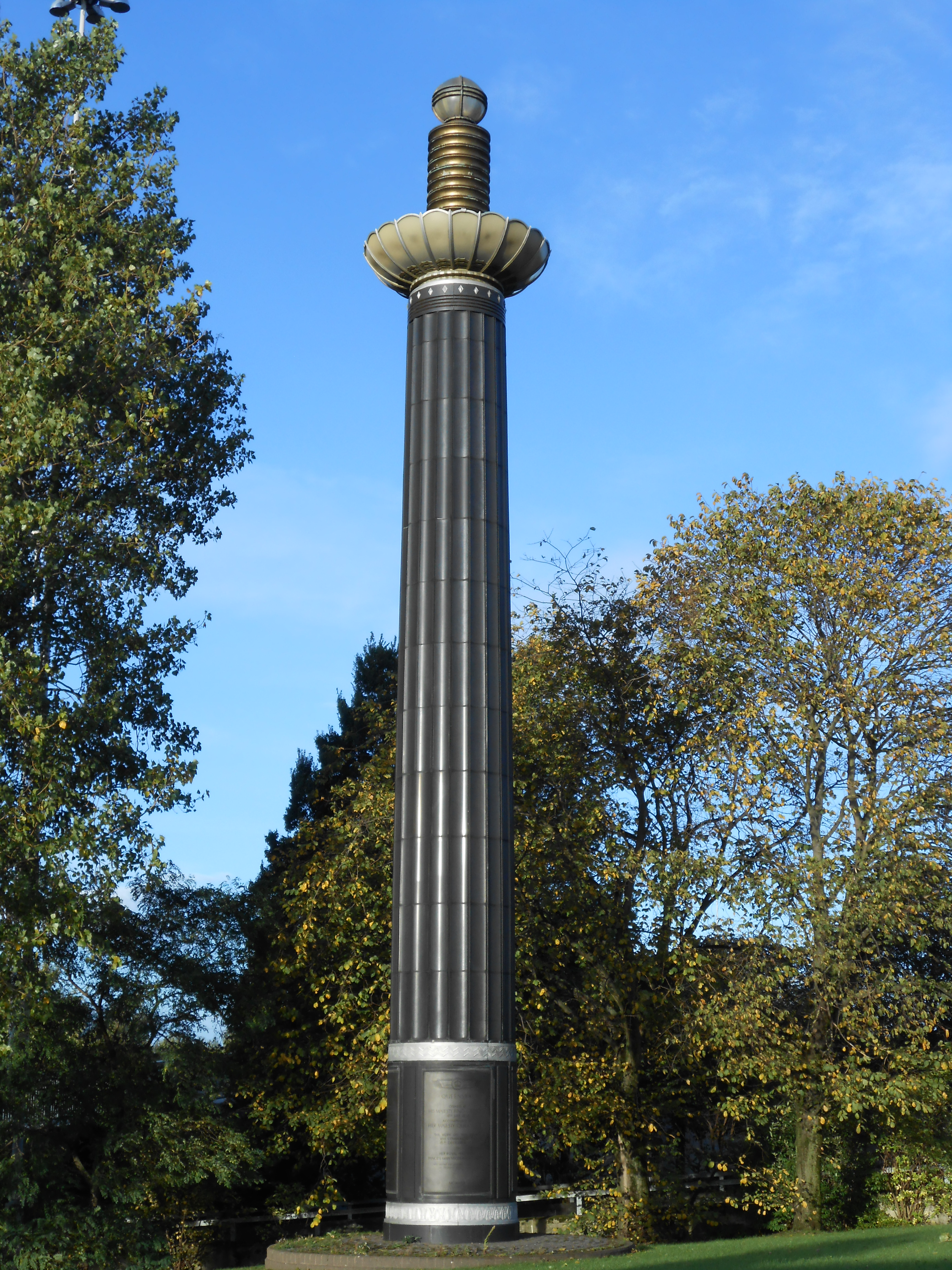
One of the original Art Deco lamp pillars from Birkenhead, now the Monument to the Mersey Tunnel

Different height restrictions apply to the nearside and offside lanes in each direction, because of the curvature of the tunnel. These are 3.9 metres (13 ft) and 4.75 metres (15.6 ft) respectively, and there is a 3.5 t weight limit for goods vehicles. All buses are required to use the offside lane, regardless of their height. Lane signals (consisting of an illuminated green arrow or red cross) are displayed at regular intervals, although in normal circumstances none of the lanes are currently used bidirectionally. This is in contrast to the Kingsway Tunnel, where lanes in toll concourse are alternated to prioritise higher traffic in one direction during peak hours.

The tunnel has two branches leading off the main tunnel to the dock areas on both sides of the river. The Birkenhead branch tunnel (known as the Rendel Street branch, or Dock Exit) was closed in 1965. When travelling in the Birkenhead direction, the branch can still be seen inside the tunnel on the right just before the left hand bend towards the Birkenhead exit. The exit of this branch can also be seen on the outside from Rendel Street near the junction with Marcus Street, just north of Cleveland Street in Birkenhead. This branch also carried two-way traffic, single lane each way. It was also controlled by traffic lights inside the tunnel. This branch mainly served Birkenhead docks and for people travelling to the Wirral resort of New Brighton. These are now best served by the Kingsway Tunnel. The Liverpool branch tunnel remains in use, in the exit direction only. It emerges opposite the Liver Building, next to the Atlantic Tower Hotel and Church of Our Lady and Saint Nicholas. Originally, it carried two-way traffic and the junction inside the tunnel was controlled by traffic lights, but this arrangement was discontinued to reduce the delays brought on by increasing traffic levels. Had it been built, the tunnel would have connected with the Liverpool urban motorway, the planned inner ring road.

=== Tolls ===
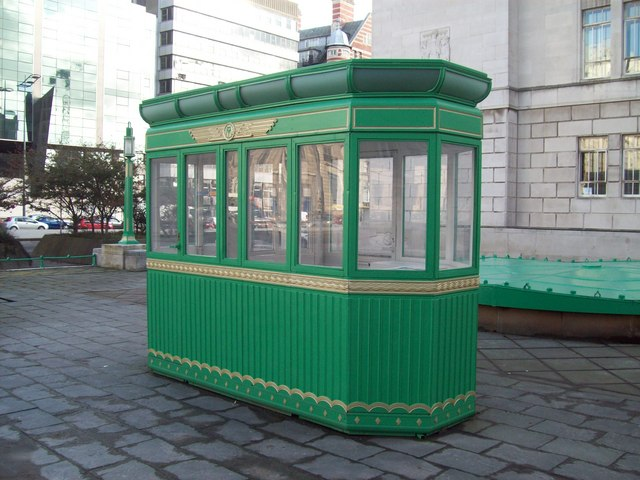
An original tollbooth, now preserved in Liverpool

Tolls have been a feature of tunnel use since the Queensway Tunnel opened in 1934. Although residents were originally told tolls would be removed when debts were repaid, this position was dropped long ago. Debts and tolls were increased when the Kingsway Tunnel was built in 1971 to relieve congestion in the first tunnel. The County of Merseyside Act 1980 (c. x) enshrined in law the right to continue collecting tolls once the debts were repaid. The later Mersey Tunnels Act 2004 (c. ii) created a legal position where tolls charged must rise in line with the Retail Price Index (RPI) as published in November.

As of August 2026, the toll is £2.40 per journey for a single passenger car of typical size, with progressively higher tolls for larger vehicles; solo motorcycles are free. Residents of the Liverpool City Region who use the T-Flow pre-paid system pay £1.60 per journey. Average daily traffic through the tunnel currently stands at 35,000 vehicles, which equates to just under £12.8 million per year.

=== Ventilation ===
As a roadway the tunnel requires ventilation to clear vehicle exhaust fumes. As originally designed the tunnel would have used forced air for ventilation; fumes and noxious gases were simply to be expelled through the tunnel exits. However, in an incident in the Liberty Tunnel in Pittsburgh in May 1924, inadequate ventilation led to a number of drivers being overcome by carbon monoxide poisoning, though there were no fatalities; this led the Queensway engineers to re-examine the issue and to conduct experiments in a completed section under Hamilton Square. Extractors were installed in the planned ventilation stations, adding to their size and complexity, and also adding considerably to the budget.

The tunnel currently has six ventilation shafts, three on each side of the river. On the Wirral side the main shaft is at Woodside, with another (before the main exit) in Sidney Street, while the Dock Exit branch is served by the tower in Taylor Street. On the Liverpool side the main shaft is at the Pier head, in the George's Dock Building, with another (before the main exit) in North John Street, and the Strand Exit branch is served by the tower in Fazakerley Street. The Georges Dock Building also houses offices of the Tunnels Authority and of the Tunnels Police Force. All the ventilation buildings were designed by Herbert Rowse, chief architect for the Queensway tunnel exteriors, and all are Grade II listed.

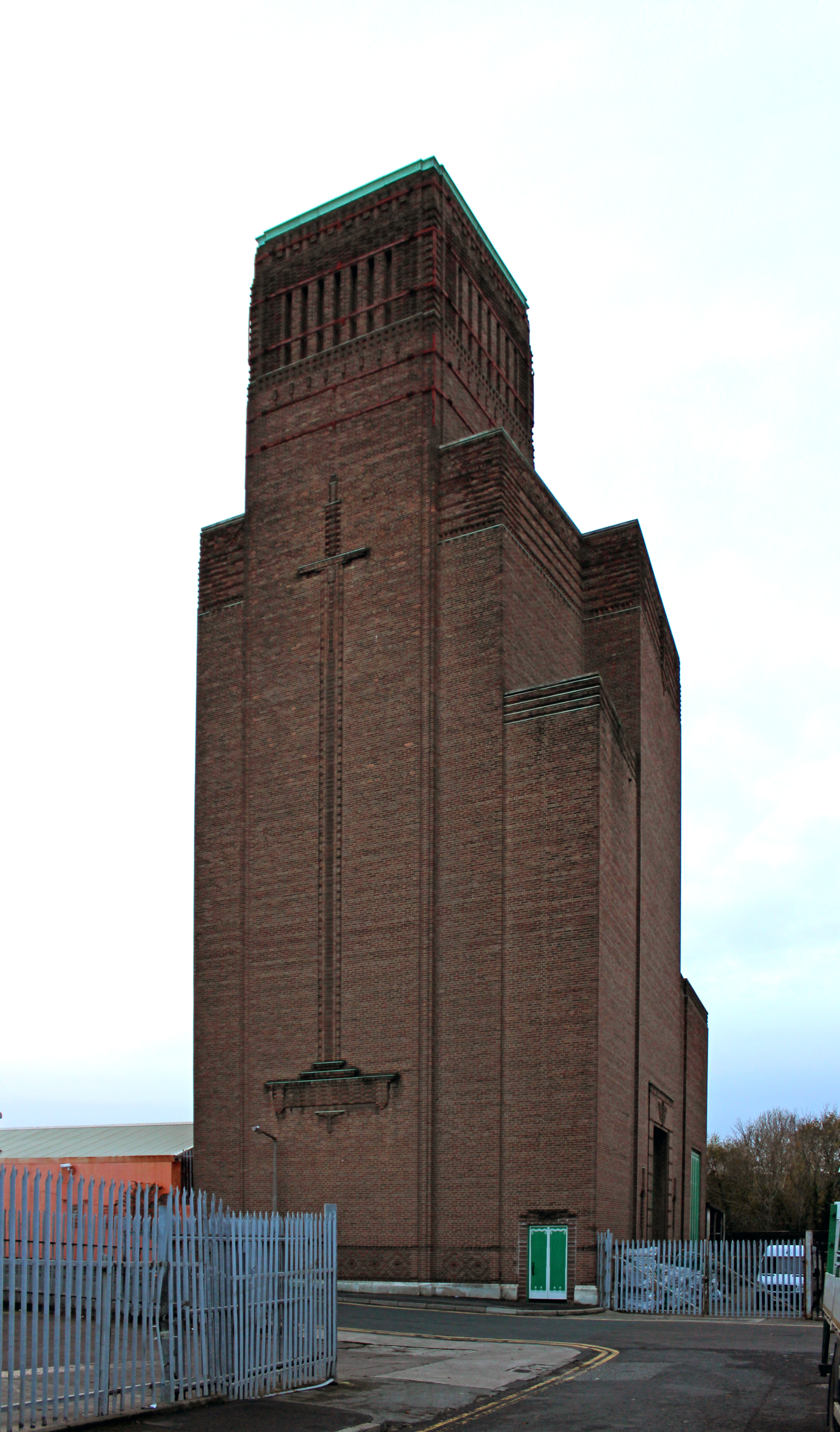
Taylor Street ventilator, Wirral

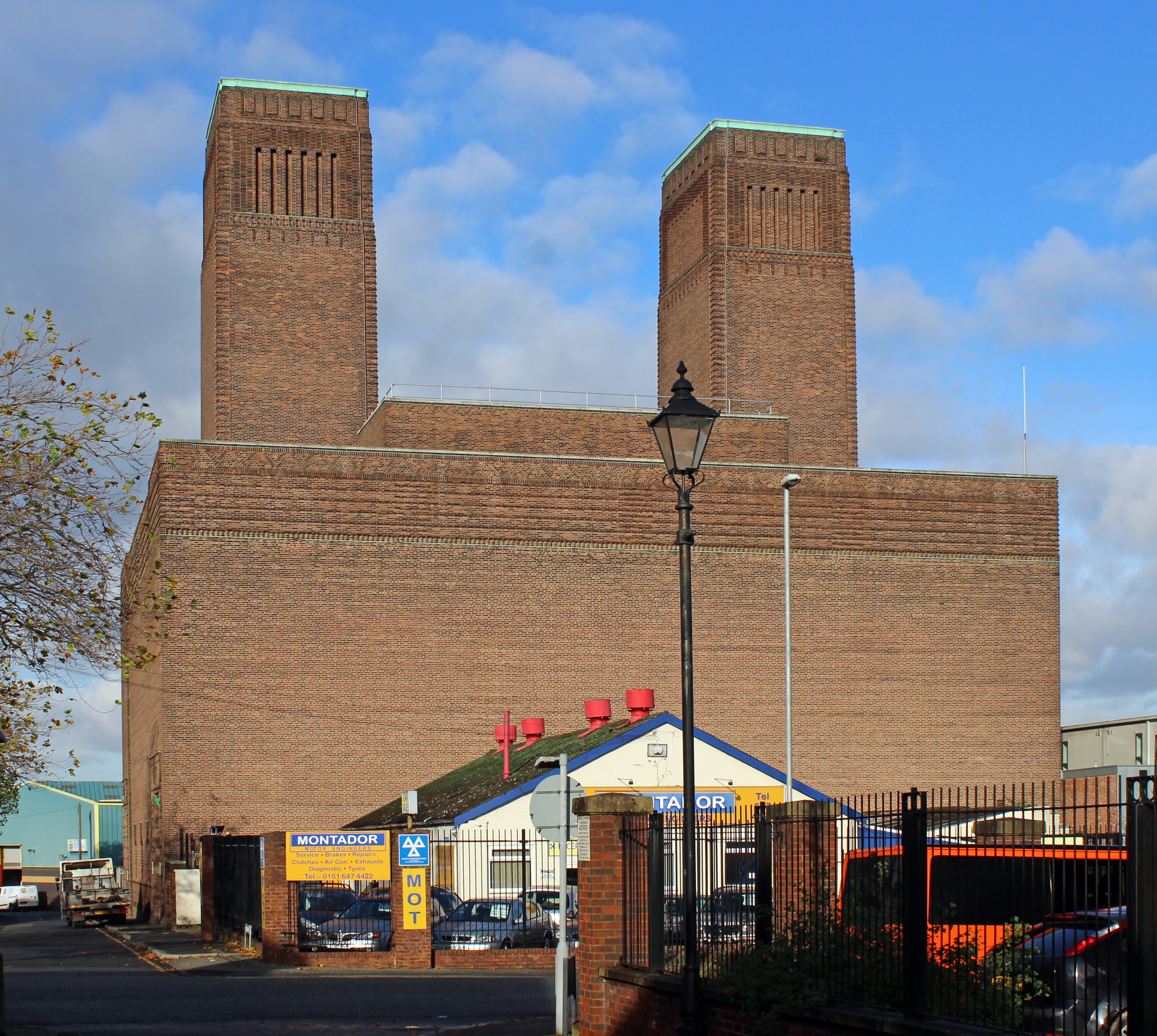
Sidney Street ventilator, Wirral

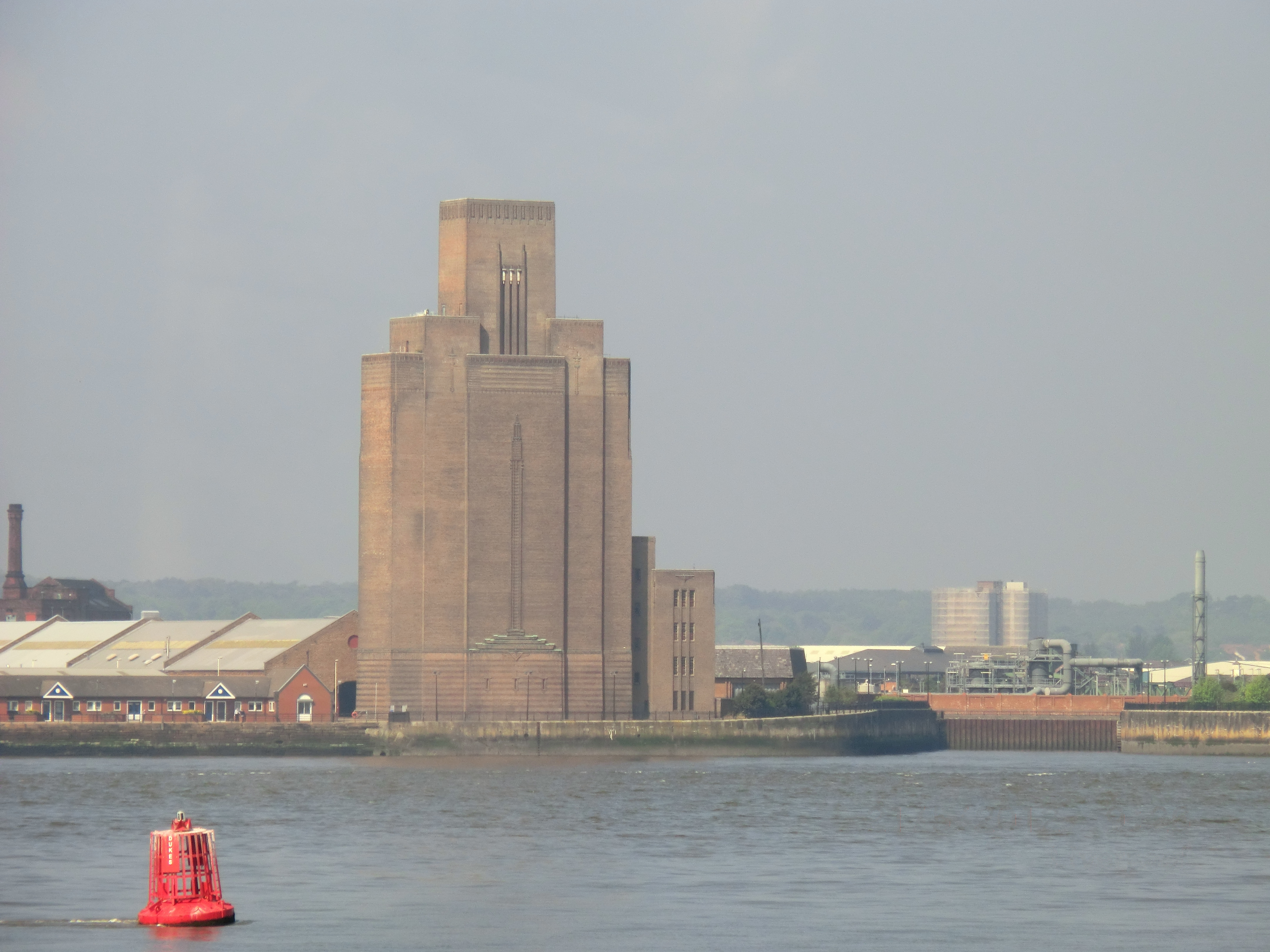
Woodside main ventilator, Wirral

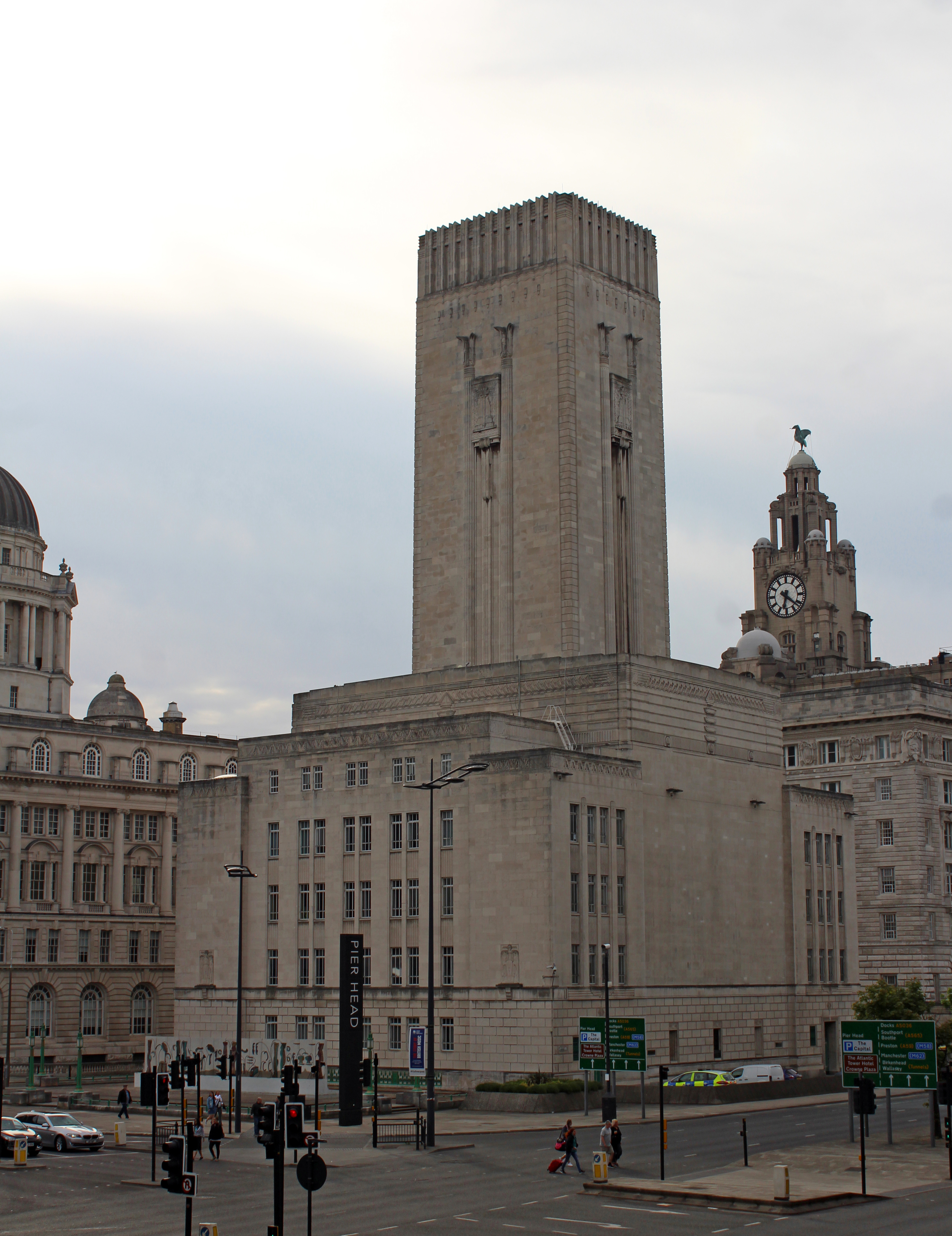
Georges Dock main ventilator, Liverpool

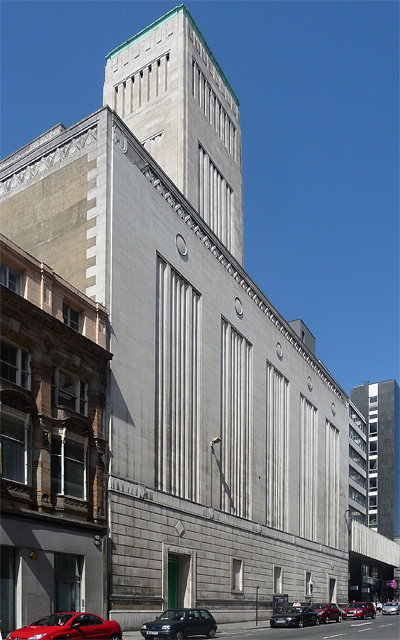
North John Street ventilator, Liverpool

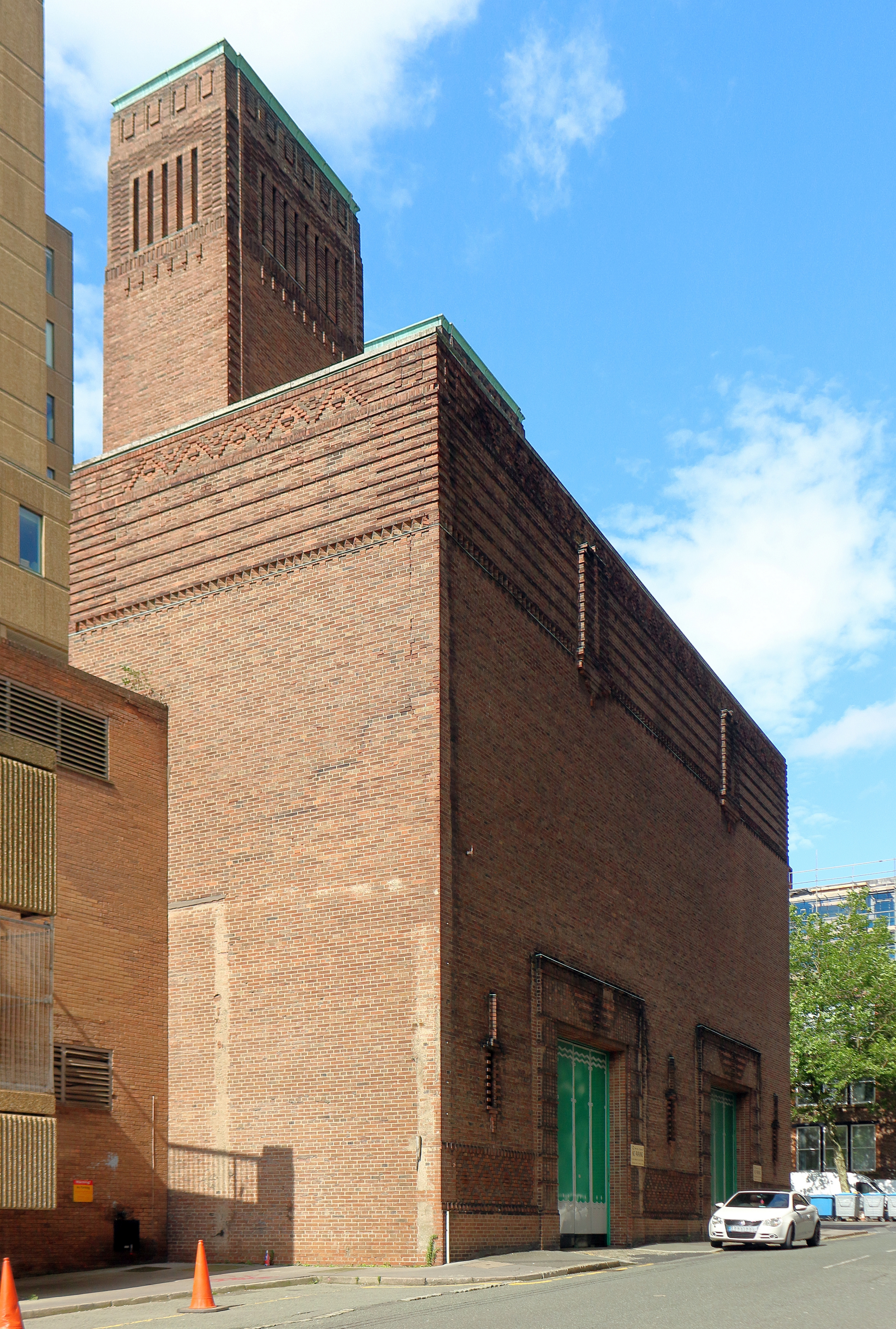
Fazakerley Street ventilator, Liverpool

== Use in film ==
The tunnel was used in the 1993 film In the Name of the Father where Emma Thompson's character drives through the tunnel in one of the opening scenes.

In September 2009, a scene from Harry Potter and the Deathly Hallows – Part 1 set in the Dartford Crossing was filmed in Queensway Tunnel, where Harry skips on a bus while on Hagrid's enchanted motorbike was filmed in the tunnel.

In 2012 the tunnel was used for the filming of a chase scene for Fast & Furious 6.

In March 2018, the tunnel was used for the filming of Yesterday, directed by Danny Boyle. The two main characters are frolicking in an empty tunnel when the bright yellow words "Hello Goodbye" are rolling through the tunnel.

Also in 2018 the tunnel was a location for the BBC TV series The City and the City, where it served as the gateway between the two cities.

The tunnel features in the 2022 film The Batman, and will appear in The Batman: Part II, with filming occurring in May 2026.

== In popular culture ==
The Dubliners popularised the song "I Wish I Was Back in Liverpool", which includes a verse about the building of the Queensway Tunnel.

== See also ==
- Architecture of Liverpool
- Listed buildings in Birkenhead

Next tunnel upstream	River Mersey	Next tunnel downstream
Mersey Railway Tunnel	Queensway Tunnel	Kingsway Tunnel

Records
Preceded by Col de Tende Road Tunnel; 3.18 km (1.97 mi)	World's longest road tunnel 1934-1948	Succeeded by Vielha Tunnel; 5.23 km (3.25 mi)
