= Manchester Dock, Liverpool =

Former dock on the River Mersey, Liverpool, England

Manchester Dock
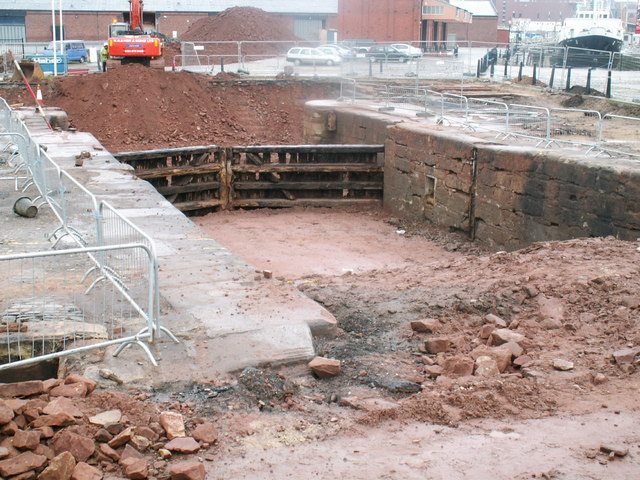
- Manchester Dock entrance lock, unearthed during 2007 for the excavation for the Liverpool Canal Link.

Location
- Location: Liverpool, United Kingdom
- Coordinates: 53.4031°N 2.9949°W
- OS grid: SJ339900

Details
- Opened: 1785
- Closed: 1929
- Type: Wet dock
- Area: 1 acre (0.40 ha), 595 sq yd (497 m^{2})
- Width at entrance: 32 ft 10 in (10.01 m)
- Quay length: 339 yd (310 m)

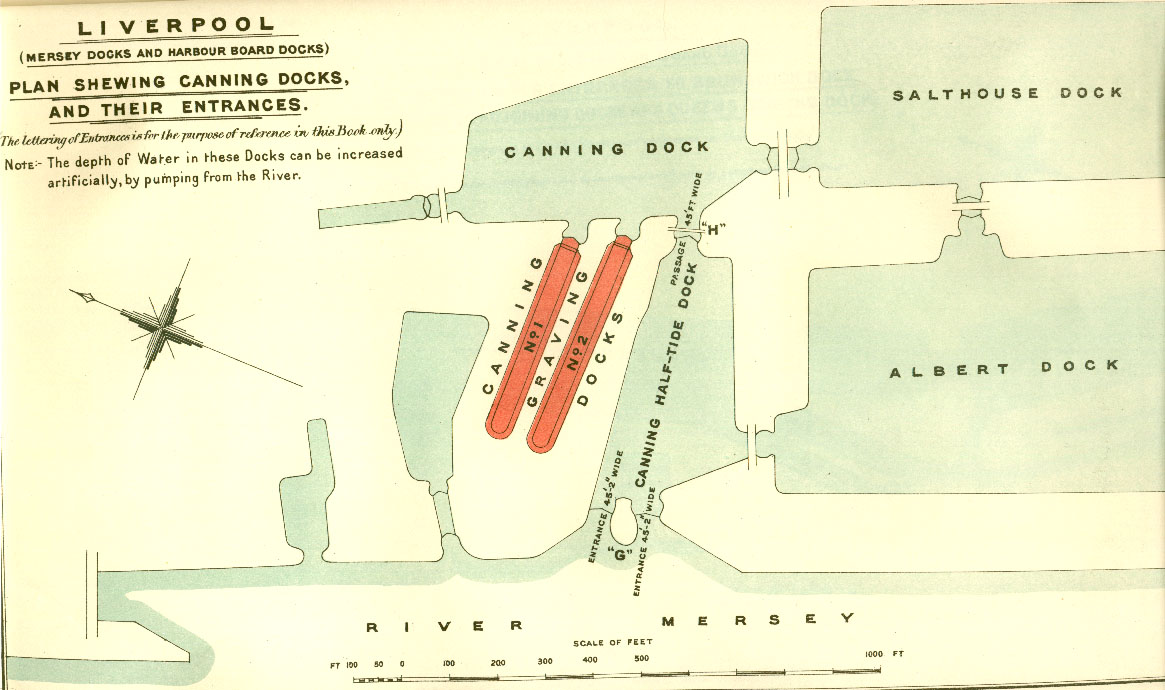
British Empire Dockyards and Ports, 1909. Manchester Dock shown unlabelled to the left of the graving docks.

Manchester Dock was a dock on the River Mersey in England and a part of the Port of Liverpool. The dock was not part of the interconnected dock system, but was connected directly to the river.

== History ==
In the 1780s, the docks at Liverpool were expanding, and the Manchester Basin was built to the north of the Canning Dock. It was a tidal basin which was linked directly to the river, and was not linked directly to the other docks. The benefits of turning it into a proper dock were soon realised, and an entrance lock was constructed between 1810 and 1815, by John Foster, Sr., after which it was known as the Manchester Dock. The dock was an important gateway for the export of coal and manufactured goods, and for the import of corn and cotton. With the formation of the Shropshire Union Railways and Canal Company in 1845, the dock was used to hold their barges, and later those of the Great Western Railway, who transferred goods between the dock and their rail terminal at Morpeth Dock in Birkenhead.

The Liverpool Docks were controlled by the Docks Committee between 1825 and 1857. During this period, the total area of the docks was increased from 82 to 192 acres (0.78 km^{2}), and the length of the quays was 15 miles (24 km) by 1857. Most of the increase was achieved by the construction of new docks, but they also purchased the Manchester Dock in 1851. Control of the docks passed to the Mersey Docks and Harbour Board in 1858.

By the 1920s, the dock traffic waned. Manchester Dock and the adjacent Chester Basin were dangerously subsiding because of excavation works for the Queensway Tunnel which ran underneath the site. Both docks were filled in by 1936, using rubble obtained from the construction of the tunnel. The area later became a car park, sealing the remains under a protective layer of tarmac.

== Excavation ==
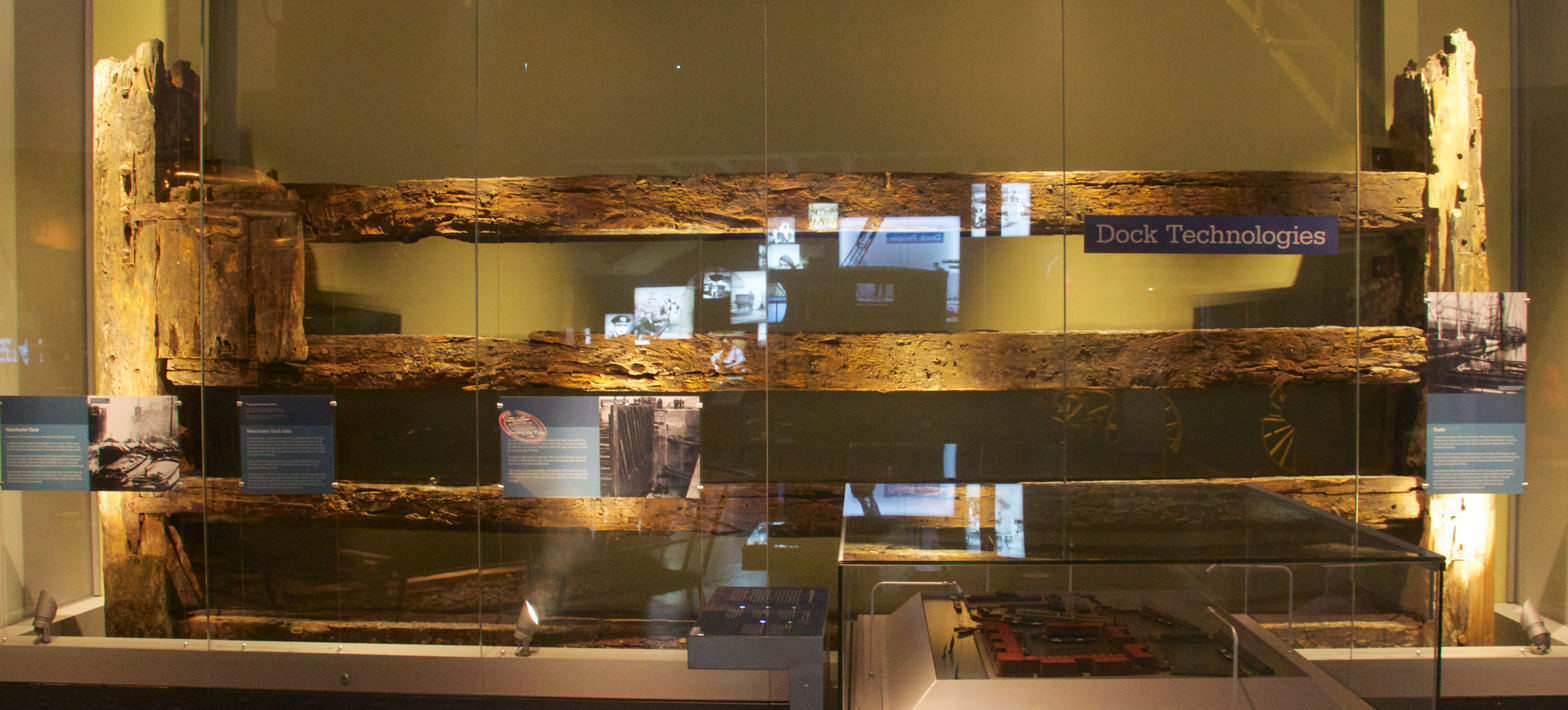
The dock gate on display at the Museum of Liverpool.

In 2006/7, the dock was excavated as part of a major construction project for the new Museum of Liverpool and the Leeds and Liverpool Canal link to the Canning and Albert Docks. These excavations also exposed the neighbouring Chester Basin, and have provided important archaeological information as the entrance lock is one of the oldest in the whole Liverpool Docks complex. Most other locks of a similar age have either been destroyed or extensively modified.
