= Mersey Tunnels Police =

Specialist police force in Merseyside, England

- Logo of the Mersey Tunnels Police
- Abbreviation: MTP

Agency overview
- Formed: 1936

Jurisdictional structure
- Legal jurisdiction: Mersey Tunnels and approaches
- Governing body: Merseytravel
- Constituting instrument: Section 105 of the County of Merseyside Act (1980)
- General nature: Civilian police

Operational structure
- Headquarters: Georges Dock Building, Georges Dockway, Liverpool
- Officers: 51 (2015)

Facilities
- Stations: 1

Website
- Official Mersey Tunnels Website

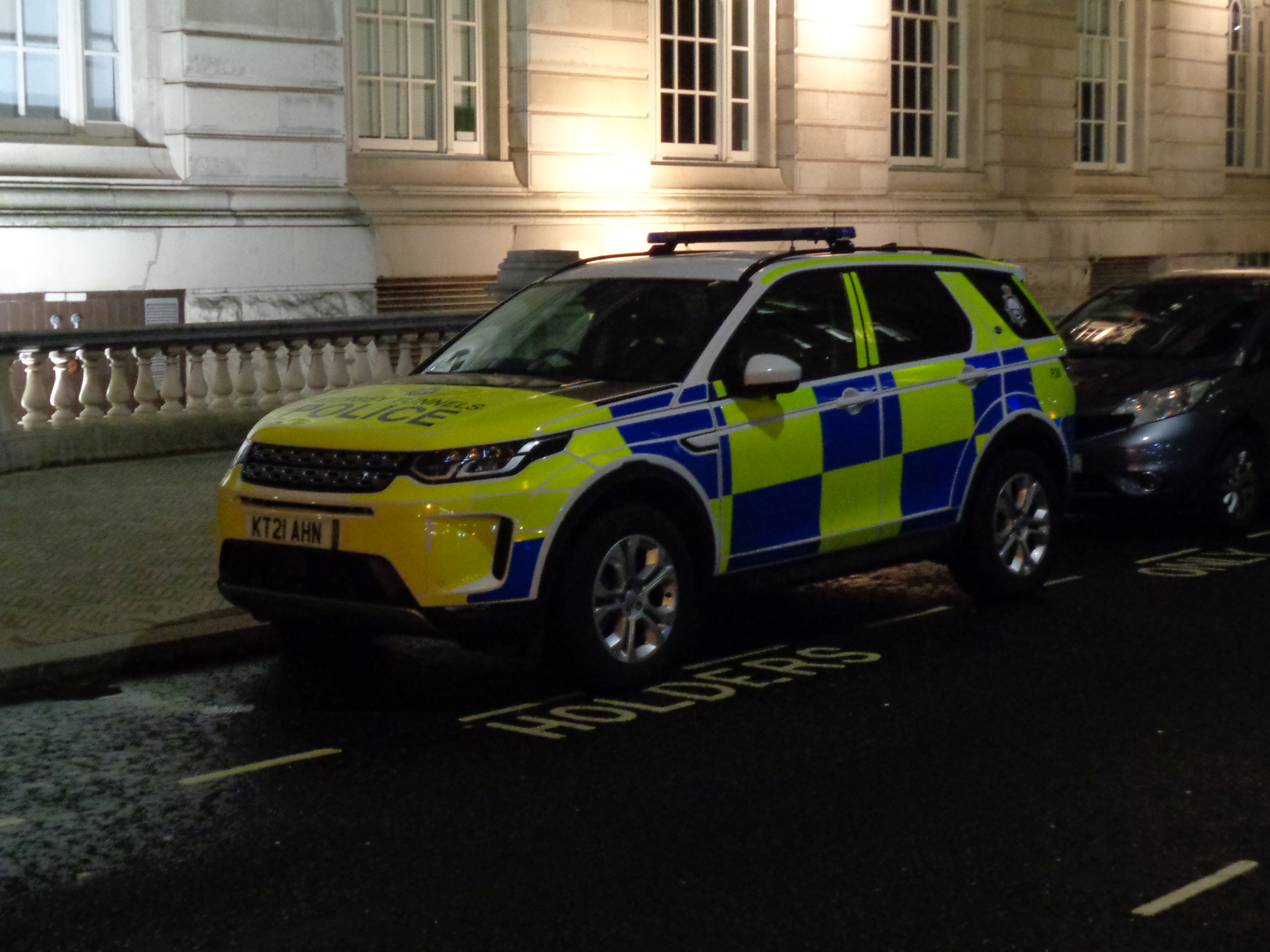
Mersey Tunnels Police Land Rover Discovery Sport

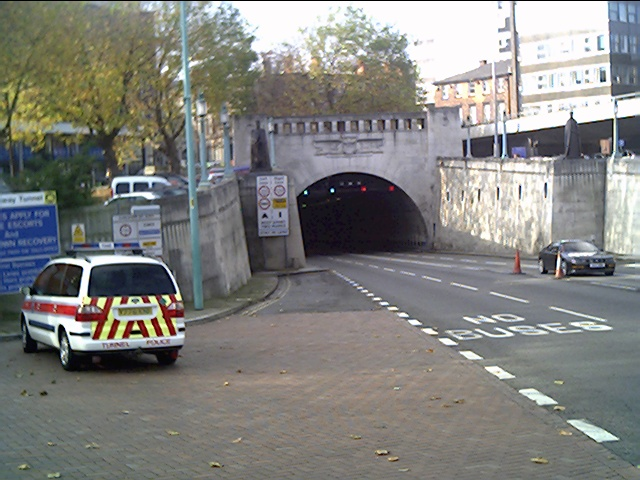
Mersey Tunnels Police car outside the entrance to one of the tunnels for which the police service is responsible

The Mersey Tunnels Police is a small, specialised, non-Home Office police force that provides policing services for the Mersey Tunnels in Merseyside, England. The force, which comprises 51 officers from constable to chief police officer is responsible for effective road policing of the Mersey Tunnels, Approach Roads and Exit Roads. It is privately funded by Merseytravel which in turn reports to the Liverpool City Region Combined Authority.

== Role and powers ==
Mersey Tunnels Police officers hold the office of constable and take their powers from section 105 of the County of Merseyside Act 1980. Unlike most police services in England and Wales, the service is answerable to the Merseyside Passenger Transport Executive rather than the Home Office. The executive also appoints the service's officers who are formally sworn in as police constables by a justice of the peace. As of 2010 the service consisted of around 55 officers across the various ranks.

=== Jurisdiction ===
The service's jurisdiction consists of the tunnels themselves, marshaling areas and approach roads as defined in the byelaws and section 105 of The County if Merseyside Act 1980. Officers execute their duties in accordance with The Mersey Tunnels Bylaws. In some cases, officers may assist with high-urgency motorway incidents in the surrounding area where other patrols are further away.

The tunnels service have primary responsibility for these areas, meaning they enforce the Mersey Tunnels bylaws and like all other police services the various and relevant UK statute law/legislation although perhaps by the nature of the role primarily the Road Traffic Act. Mersey Tunnels Police officers are the first line responders to any incidents or emergencies within the tunnels or premises although certain incidents and enquiries of a serious nature may be dealt with by Merseyside Police in accordance with local agreements between the two services.

=== History and strength ===
Formed in January 1936 with two inspectors, four sergeants and 14 constables they undertook motorcycle patrols of the tunnels. The force grew to a maximum strength of one chief superintendent, one chief inspector, five inspectors, 15 sergeants and 60 constables.

As of January 2015, the establishment of the service consisted of 51 officers, divided amongst the following ranks: One chief officer, five inspectors, ten sergeants and 35 constables. All new recruits are required to be serving or former police officers in another force; the force does not recruit direct from members of the public.

== Rank structure ==
The ranks of the Mersey Tunnels Police consists of:

Mersey Tunnels Police rank structure
Rank	Constable	Sergeant	Inspector	Chief Officer
Insignia	PC Epaulette	PS Epaulette		n/a

All officers have the powers of a constable, regardless of rank (see above for details).

== Uniform, training and equipment ==
Mersey Tunnel Police officers wear a uniform similar to other police forces, but wear white-topped peaked caps, as traffic officers.

Personal protective equipment (PPE) include:

- Monadnock auto-lock baton
- Rigid handcuffs
- Stab vests
- Personal radios.

All officers are trained Police Level 4 Response Driving Standards, as MTP is a specialist traffic service. Training is done by MTP instructors and the Liverpool Cathedral Constables hold kit in their facility.

== Media coverage ==
Mersey Tunnels Police was heavily criticised by the Merseyside coroner for its handling of a pursuit in which two 14-year-old boys were killed in 2003 after crashing a stolen car into a roadblock set up by Mersey Tunnels officers. The coroner went so far as to recommend that either the policing of the tunnel should be altogether transferred to Merseyside Police, or tunnel officers should be trained to national policing standards.

All officers are now trained in Police Level 4 Response Driving Standards.

== Fallen officers ==
The Mersey Tunnels Police has lost one officer in the line of duty. On 10 November 1967, Police Constable Derek McIntyre was fatally injured while responding to an early-morning report of an iron bar obstructing two lanes of the Mersey Tunnel. After bringing traffic to a halt, PC McIntyre left his vehicle to remove the hazard. During this operation, a 22-ton lorry and trailer—later found to have defective brakes—failed to stop and collided with a private car and the police Land Rover before striking PC McIntyre and carrying him for approximately 120 ft (37 m). He sustained fatal injuries as a result of the incident.

== See also ==
- List of law enforcement agencies in the United Kingdom, Crown Dependencies and British Overseas Territories
- Law enforcement in the United Kingdom
- Port of Liverpool Police
- Merseyside Police
