= George Christian =

George Christian may refer to:

- George Christian (journalist) (1927–2002), journalist and White House press secretary
- George Christian (Connecticut Four), librarian who helped fight a gag order provision in the Patriot Act
- George Christian, Prince of East Frisia (1634–1665)
- George Christian, Landgrave of Hesse-Homburg (1626–1677)
- George Llewellyn Christian (1841–1924), Confederate soldier in the American Civil War
- George William Christian (1872–1924), Black British merchant

== See also ==
- George Christian Darbyshire (1820–1898), English and Australian civil engineer
- George Christensen (disambiguation)
