= Royal Park Hotel (disambiguation) =

Royal Park Hotel is a hotel in Hong Kong.

Royal Park Hotel may also refer to:

- Royal Park Hotel, Toxteth, a hotel in Toxteth, Liverpool, England, UK
- Royal Park Hotel Rochester Detroit, a hotel in the Detroit suburb of Rochester, Michigan, U.S.
