= Turner Home, Liverpool =

Turner Home
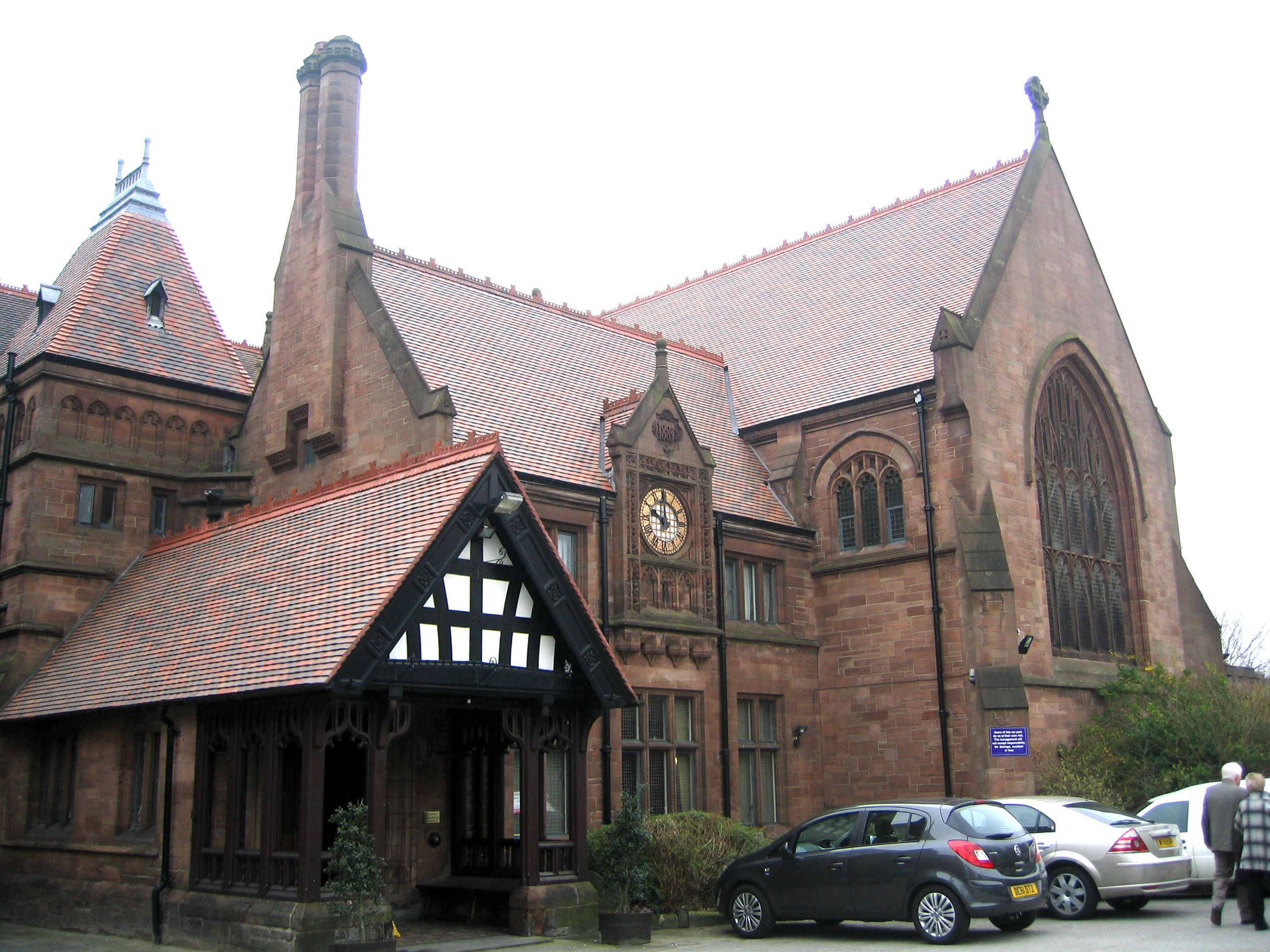
- Entrance porch and chapel

- Location in Merseyside
- 53.3805°N 2.9565°W
- Location: Dingle Lane, Toxteth, Liverpool, Merseyside, England
- OS grid reference: SJ 364 875

History
- Built: 1884
- Built for: Mrs Anne Turner

Site notes
- Architect: Alfred Waterhouse
- Architectural style: Gothic Revival

Listed Building – Grade II
- Designated: 14 March 1975
- Reference no.: 1068252

The Turner Home (formerly the Turner Memorial Home, then the Turner Nursing Home) is in Dingle Lane, Toxteth, Liverpool, Merseyside, England. Founded for the care of sick and disadvantaged men, it continues to function as a registered residential and nursing home for men. The building is recorded in the National Heritage List for England as a designated Grade II listed building.

== History ==
The building of the home was completed in 1884 and was designed by Alfred Waterhouse. It was built for Mrs Anne Turner as a memorial to her recently deceased husband and son. Her husband was Charles Turner, a Liverpool merchant who originated from Yorkshire. He had been chairman of Liverpool Dock Board, and a Member of Parliament. Charles Turner died in 1875, followed by his son five years later. The first full title of the home was “The Turner Memorial Home of Rest for Chronic Sufferers”. By the 1980s the fabric of the building had deteriorated, and in 1984 a Centenary Appeal was launched to raise money for essential repairs and improvements. Following this, as nursing standards and regulations changed, more modern accommodation was provided. In 1993 the Eric Fischer Wing was built, containing 44 bedrooms with en-suite facilities. This was followed in 2000 by the Ian Tod Wing, which incorporated a rehabilitation unit, a lounge, and six more bedrooms. The home is dual-registered as a residential and a nursing facility. In addition to medical and nursing care, chiropody, dental care, an optician's service, and hairdressing are provided. Parts of the main building continue to be used for communal activities, including dining, and games such as pool and snooker. Religious services are held twice a week in the chapel. Holidays and outings are arranged for the residents. The work of the home is supported by a League of Friends.

== Architecture ==
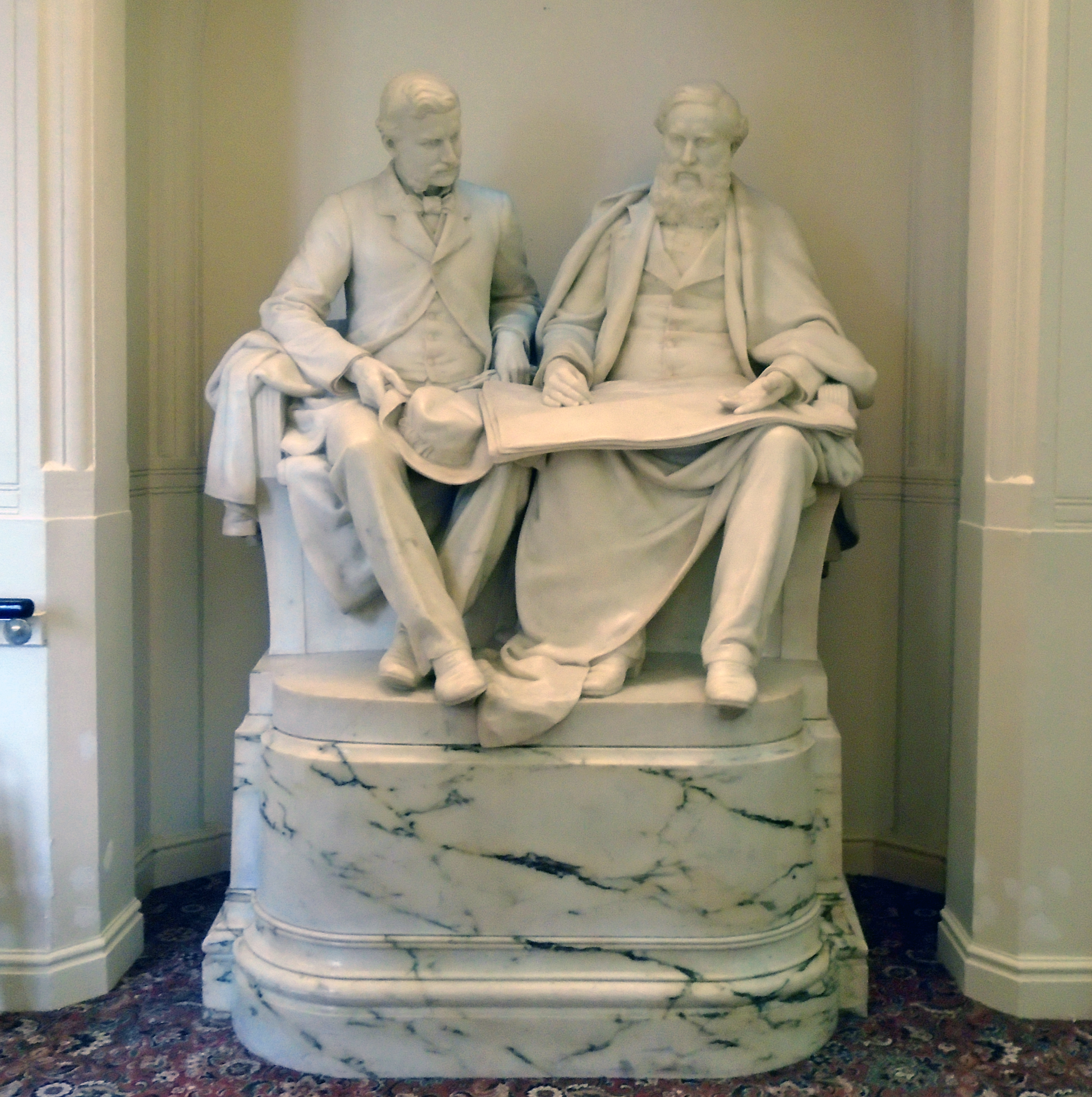
Statue of Charles Turner and son

The home is constructed in red ashlar sandstone with a tiled roof. Its architectural style is Gothic Revival. It has a very irregular plan, and is mainly in two storeys with attics. It is entered by a timber gabled porch, to the right of which is a bay containing a clock dated 1883. Further to the right is a five-bay chapel. This has a five-light east window containing Perpendicular tracery, and three-light windows along the sides. To the left of the entrance porch, and set back from it, is a round turret with a conical roof. The window in the main part of the building are framed in stone, with mullions and transoms. The doorways have pointed archways, and the chimneys are tall and clustered together. In the entrance hall is a life-size marble statue, commissioned by Anne Turner, of her late husband and son, seated and inspecting a piece of cloth. It was carved by Hamo Thornycroft in 1885. The chapel has an open timber roof, a gallery housing the organ, and an aisle with an arcade supported on octagonal columns. Behind the altar is a carved alabaster reredos. The stained glass in the window above is by Heaton, Butler and Bayne. Flanking the windows are boards with the Ten Commandments, the Creed and the Lord's Prayer.

== Lodge ==
At the entrance to the drive leading to the home is a lodge, also dating from 1884 and designed by Waterhouse. It is constructed in stone with a tiled roof, and has an L-shaped plan. The lodge is listed, separately from the home, at Grade II.

== See also ==
- Grade II listed buildings in Liverpool-L8
