= Grade II listed buildings in Liverpool-L8 =

Liverpool is a city and port in Merseyside, England, which contains many listed buildings. A listed building is a structure designated by English Heritage of being of architectural and/or of historical importance and, as such, is included in the National Heritage List for England. There are three grades of listing, according to the degree of importance of the structure. Grade I includes those buildings that are of "exceptional interest, sometimes considered to be internationally important"; the buildings in Grade II* are "particularly important buildings of more than special interest"; and those in Grade II are "nationally important and of special interest". Very few buildings are included in Grade I — only 2.5% of the total. Grade II* buildings represent 5.5% of the total, while the great majority, 92%, are included in Grade II.

Liverpool contains more than 1,550 listed buildings, of which 28 are in Grade I, 109 in Grade II*, and the rest in Grade II. (Note: These figures are taken from a search in the National Heritage List for England in May 2013, and are subject to variation as further buildings are listed, grades are revised, or buildings are delisted.) This list contains the Grade II listed buildings in the L8 postal district of Liverpool. The district is almost completely residential, and results from the expansion of the city in the early 19th century. These houses are in Georgian style, and some of the district forms part of what has been called the Georgian quarter of the city. A high proportion of the buildings in the list are houses from this period, usually in groups or terraces. Also included in the district is Princes Park, and its three entrances are listed. The list also includes three churches, public buildings, two monuments, a public house and brewery, a men's residential home, and a variety of structures such as drinking fountains and lamp standards.

Grade II listed buildings from other areas in the city can be found through the box on the right, along with the lists of the Grade I and Grade II* buildings in the city.

== Buildings ==
Name	Location	Photograph	Built	Notes
—	128 and 130 Bedford Street South, 64 and 66 Falkner Street; 53.3994°N 2.9666°W		1820s	Four brick houses with stone dressings and a hipped slate roof. They have three storeys and basements, and the houses are in two or three bays. At the top of the terrace is a frieze and a cornice. The windows are casements with wedge lintels. The round-headed entrances have Doric doorcases with fluted columns.
Entrance, Princes Park	Belvidere Road; 53.38329°N 2.95563°W		c. 1843	The entrance consists of four gate piers, with a pair of central gates and single gates at the sides. The gate piers are in stone, and have angle pilasters and entablatures. The gates, with a radial pattern, are replicas of earlier gates, and date from about 1960.
—	13 Belvidere Road; 53.3848°N 2.9570°W		1860s	Now incorporated into a school, this originated as a brick house with stucco and stone dressings and a slate roof. It has three storeys and a basement, and is in five bays. The windows have architraves. In front of the house are panelled piers, with cornice caps, walls, railings and lamp standards; these are included in the designation.
—	15 Belvidere Road; 53.3851°N 2.9573°W		1860s	Now incorporated into a school, this originated as a brick house with stucco and stone dressings and a slate roof. It has three storeys and a basement, and is in five bays. The windows have architraves; those on the ground and first floors also have keystones. The central first floor window has a frieze and a pediment.
—	17 Belvidere Road; 53.3851°N 2.9573°W		1860s	Now incorporated into a school, this originated as a brick house with stucco and stone dressings and a slate roof. It has three storeys and a basement, and is in five bays. There is a two-storey, three-bay extension to the right. The windows have architraves. In the first bay is a two-storey canted bay window. At the entrance is an Ionic porch.
—	44–74 Belvidere Road; 53.3832°N 2.9565°W		1860s	A terrace of stucco and brick houses, with slate roofs. Each house has three storeys, and is in three bays. The windows are a mix of sashes and casements. The entrances are round-headed, some with Doric porches and Ionic entablatures, others with pilasters and entablatures. The end houses have three-storey bay windows.
Greek Orthodox Church	Berkley Street; 53.3954°N 2.9671°W		1865–70	The church was designed by Henry Sumners. It is built in brick and stone, and has two storeys and five bays. There are three domes over the front, and one behind, over the nave. The plan is of a cross within a rectangle. Inside is a gallery, and the dome over the nave is carried by white marble columns with Byzantine capitals.
Blackburne Terrace	Blackburne Place; 53.3993°N 2.9695°W		1826	A terrace of six brick houses with stone dressings and slate roofs. They have three storeys and basements, and each house is in three bays. At the top of the houses is a frieze and a cornice. The windows are sashes with wedge lintels. Number 1 and 6 have entrances with architraves, angle pilasters and entablatures; the other houses have porches with Doric columns and entablatures.
Blackburne House	Blackburne Place; 53.3999°N 2.9705°W		1788	This was built as a private house, and in 1844 became Blackburne House Girls' School, the first school for girls in Liverpool. The building was extended in 1874–76, and continued as a school until 1986. It was later converted into a women's resource centre. It is constructed in brick with stone dressings, and has a slate roof. It is in two storeys, with a basement and an attic.
—	3 Blackburne Place; 53.3997°N 2.9701°W		1820s	A brick house with stone dressings and a slate roof. It has two storeys and a basement, and is in two bays. At the top is a frieze and a cornice. The windows are sashes with wedge lintels. The entrance has a plain lintel.
—	5 and 7 Blackburne Place; 53.3997°N 2.9700°W		1820s	Two brick houses with stone dressings and slate roofs. They have three storeys and basements, and each house is in two bays. At the top is a cornice. The windows are sashes with wedge lintels. The entrances have flat architraves and cornices.
—	1–19 Canning Street; 53.3987°N 2.9708°W		1830s	A terrace of ten brick houses with stone dressings and slate roofs. They have three storeys and basements, and each house is in three bays. At the top of the houses is a frieze and a cornice. The windows are sashes with wedge lintels. Some of the houses have first floor balconies. The entrances have Ionic aedicules.
—	4–16 Canning Street, 1 Percy Street, 42A and 42B Catharine Street; 53.3982°N 2.9694°W		1830s	A terrace of eight stone houses with slate roofs. They have three storeys and basements, and each house is in five bays. At the top of the houses is a frieze and a cornice. Most of the windows are sashes, and some houses have first floor balconies. At the entrances are Ionic porches.
—	18–50 Canning Street, 156 and 158 Bedford Street South, 29 and 31 Catharine Street; 53.3980°N 2.9676°W		1830s	A terrace of 21 brick houses with stone dressings and slate roofs. They have three storeys and basements, and most houses are in three bays (two are in five bays). At the top of the terrace is a frieze and a cornice. The windows are sashes, and some houses have first floor balconies. At the entrances are Ionic porches.
—	21 and 23 Canning Street; 53.3986°N 2.9701°W		1830s	Two brick houses with stone dressings and slate roofs. They have three storeys and basements, and each house is in three bays. At the top is a cornice. Most of the windows are sashes with wedge lintels. The entrances have Ionic aedicules, and there are first floor balconies.
—	25 Canning Street; 53.3986°N 2.9700°W		1830s	A brick house with stone dressings and a slate roof. It has three storeys and a basement, and is in three bays. At the top is a cornice. All the windows have wedge lintels; those in the ground floor are sashes, and those above are casements. In the first floor is a balcony. The entrance has an Ionic aedicule.
—	27 Canning Street; 53.3986°N 2.9698°W		1830s	A brick house with stone dressings and a slate roof. It has three storeys and a basement, and is in three bays. At the top is a cornice. The windows are sashes with wedge lintels. In the first floor is the base of a balcony. The entrance has an Ionic aedicule.
—	29 and 31 Canning Street; 53.3986°N 2.9698°W		1830s	Two brick houses with stone dressings and slate roofs. They have three storeys and basements, and each house is in three bays. At the top is a cornice. The windows are sashes with wedge lintels. The entrances have Ionic aedicules. No 29 has a first floor balcony.
—	33 Canning Street; 53.3986°N 2.9697°W		1830s	A brick house with stone dressings and a slate roof. It has three storeys and a basement, and is in three bays. At the top is a frieze and a cornice. The windows are sashes with wedge lintels. In the first floor is a balcony. The entrance has an Ionic aedicule.
—	35 and 37 Canning Street; 53.3986°N 2.9695°W		1830s	Two brick houses with stone dressings and slate roofs. They have three storeys and basements, and each house is in three bays. At the top is a cornice. The windows are sashes with wedge lintels. The entrances have Ionic columns and entablatures.
—	39 Canning Street; 53.3985°N 2.9692°W		1830s	A brick house with stone dressings and a slate roof. It has three storeys and a basement, and is in three bays. At the top is a cornice. The windows are sashes with wedge lintels. In the first floor is a balcony. The entrance has an Ionic aedicule.
—	41 and 43 Canning Street, 42 Catharine Street; 53.3985°N 2.9689°W		1820s	Three brick house with stone dressings and hipped slate roofs. They have three storeys and basements, and each house is in three bays, other than No 42 Catharine Street, which has four bays, and two bays on Canning Street. At the top of the houses is a cornice. The windows are sashes with wedge lintels. The entrances have Ionic aedicules, and some of the houses have first floor balconies.
—	45–55 Canning Street; 53.3983°N 2.9674°W		1850s	A terrace of six stuccoed houses with slate roofs. They have three storeys, basements and attics, and each house is in two bays. There are rusticated quoins at the corners and flanking the central bays. Most of the windows are sashes, and those in the first floor have architraves, friezes and cornices. Some houses have first floor balconies. Along the attics are gabled dormers.
—	52–74 Canning Street, 165 Bedford Street South; 53.3980°N 2.9657°W		1830s	A terrace of 13 brick houses with stone dressings and slate roofs. They have three storeys and basements, and each house is in three bays. At the top of the houses is a frieze and a cornice. Most of the windows are sashes, and all have wedge lintels. At the entrances are Ionic porches.
—	57–61 Canning Street; 53.3982°N 2.9662°W		1830s	Three brick houses with stone dressings and slate roofs. They have three storeys and basements, and each house is in three or four bays. At the top of the houses is a frieze and a cornice. The windows are sashes with wedge lintels. At the entrances are Ionic porches. There are first floor balconies on No 59 and on the side of No 57.
—	76 Canning Street; 53.3981°N 2.9650°W		1830s	A brick house with stone dressings and a slate roof. It has three storeys and a basement, and is in four bays. At the top of the houses is a cornice. The windows are sashes with wedge lintels. The first bay is canted, and contains an entrance with an architrave and a cornice.
—	79–93 Canning Street, 22 Sandon Street; 53.3984°N 2.9651°W		1830s	A terrace of 8 houses, plus 22 Sandon Street, built of brick with stone dressings and slate roofs. They have 3 storeys with basement and 3 bays to each house.
—	3–11 Catharine Street, 11A Catharine Street, 15–23 Catharine Street; 53.3990°N 2.9682°W		1820s	A terrace of eleven brick houses with stone dressings and slate roofs. They have three storeys and basements, and each house is in three bays. At the top of the terrace is a frieze and a cornice. The windows are sashes with wedge lintels. The entrances have angle pilasters and entablatures.
—	38 and 40 Catharine Street; 53.3988°N 2.9688°W		Early 19th century	Two brick houses with stone dressings and slate roofs. They have three storeys and a basement. Each house is in three bays. At the top is a frieze and a cornice. The windows have wedge lintels and are sashes. The entrances have angle pilasters and entablatures.
—	43 Catharine Street; 53.3974°N 2.9681°W		1820s	A brick house with stone dressings and a slate roof. It has three storeys, a basement and an attic, and is in three bays. At the top of the house is an entablature with a cornice. The windows are sashes. The entrance in the third bay has an Ionic porch, and the attics have dormers.
—	44–50 Catharine Street; 53.3977°N 2.9688°W		1830s	A terrace of four stuccoed houses with slate roofs. They have three storeys and basements, and each house is in three bays. At the top of the house is a cornice. The windows are sashes. The entrances have Ionic porches. Three of the houses have fists floor balconies.
—	45 Catharine Street; 53.39735°N 2.96808°W		1830s	A brick house with stone dressings and a slate roof. It has three storeys and a basement, and is in three bays. At the top of the house is a cornice. The windows have wedge lintels. The entrance has an Ionic porch.
—	47, 49 and 51 Catharine Street; 53.3969°N 2.9679°W		1830s	Three brick houses with stone dressings and slate roofs. They have three storeys and a basement. No 47 is in four bays, and Nos 49 and 51 have three bays. At the top is a frieze and a cornice. The windows are sashes with wedge lintels. The entrances have Ionic porches.
—	52 Catharine Street; 53.3976°N 2.9687°W		1830s	A brick house with stone dressings and a slate roof. It has three storeys and a basement, and is in two bays. At the top is a cornice. The windows are sashes. The entrances have angle pilasters and an entablature. There are first floor balconies on the front and side.
—	53, 55 and 57 Catharine Street; 53.3968°N 2.9679°W		1830s	Three brick houses with stone dressings and slate roofs. They have three storeys and a basement, and are in three bays. At the top is a frieze and a cornice. The windows are sashes with wedge lintels. The entrances have Ionic porches.
—	54 Catharine Street, 42 Huskisson Street; 53.3969°N 2.9684°W		1830s	Two stuccoed houses with a slate roof. They have three storeys, basements and attics. The windows are sashes. The house facing Catharine Street is in four bays, its two central bays being flanked by pilasters. At the top is a frieze and a cornice. The porch has an Ionic colonnade. The house facing Huskisson Street is in five bays. Its entrance has a cornice, above which is a balcony.
—	59, 61 and 63 Catharine Street; 53.3965°N 2.9677°W		1830s	Three brick houses with stone dressings and slate roofs. They have three storeys and a basement. Each house is in three bays. At the top is a frieze and a cornice. The windows are sashes with wedge lintels. The entrances have Ionic porches with unfluted columns.
—	7 Croxteth Road; 53.3902°N 2.9530°W		1860s	A stuccoed house with a hipped slate roof. It has two storeys, and is in four bays. There is a cornice between the floors and another at the top of the house. The third bay is canted and the fourth bay has a flat roof. There is a casement window in the fourth bay; all the other windows are sashes. Some of the windows have architraves.
—	14 Croxteth Road; 53.3892°N 2.9521°W		1860s	A stone house with a slate roof. It has two storeys, and is in three bays, the central bay having an attic with a cornice. The ground floor windows have three round-headed lights, flat pilasters and archivolts; the first floor windows have architraves and are sashes. In the attic is a round-headed window. The entrance has angle pilasters and an entablature. At the rear is a verandah.
—	16 and 18 Croxteth Road; 53.3890°N 2.9515°W		1860s	A pair of stuccoed houses with a slate roof. They have two storeys and attics, and extend for eleven bays. The second to seventh bays are recessed, the flanking bays having pediments. At the top is a frieze and a cornice. All the windows are sashes and have architraves.
Entrance, Princes Park	Devonshire Road; 53.38666°N 2.95864°W		c. 1842	The entrance consists of four gate piers, with a pair of central gates and single gates at the sides. The gate piers are in stone, and have angle pilasters, entablatures, and caps.
Stable block	Devonshire Road; 180–192 South Street; 53.3890°N 2.9561°W		1850s	A square courtyard block, originally stables, later converted into garages. It is built in brick with stucco dressings, and has a slate roof. The Devonshire Road face has 17 bays with a central arched opening above which is a pediment. The end and central bays project forward and have an entablature, a frieze and a parapet. The front facing South Street contains entrances, pitching holes, and four pedimented gables.
—	11 Devonshire Road; 53.3875°N 2.9572°W		1860s	A stuccoed house with a hipped slate roof. It has two storeys, a rusticated basement, and an attic in the form of a belvedere. It is in three bays. At the top of the house is a cornice. The porch is enclosed and rusticated, with flat pilasters and an entablature.
—	12 Devonshire Road; 53.3888°N 2.9567°W		1860s	A stuccoed house with a slate roof. It has three storeys and a basement. It is in three bays. At the top of the house is a cornice. The windows are sashes with architraves; those on the ground floor have cornices, and those on the upper floor have friezes and cornices. The entrance has an Ionic porch. To the right is a single-storey bay.
—	14 Devonshire Road; 53.3887°N 2.9568°W		1860s	A stuccoed house with a slate roof. It has three storeys and a basement, and is in three bays. At the top of the house is a cornice. The windows are sashes with architraves; those on the ground floor have cornices, and those on the upper floor have friezes and cornices. The entrance has an Ionic porch.
—	16 Devonshire Road; 53.3886°N 2.9570°W		1860s	A stuccoed house with a lead and slate Mansard roof. It has three storeys and a basement, and is in three bays. In the first bay is a three-storey canted bay window. The windows are sashes and have architraves; those on the ground floor have cornices, and those on the upper floor have friezes and cornices. In the second floor is a rectangular oriel window. The entrance has an Ionic porch.
—	18 and 20 Devonshire Road; 53.3885°N 2.9572°W		1860s	A pair of stuccoed symmetrical semi-detached houses with slate roofs. They have three storeys and basements, and each house is in three bays. All the windows are sashes and have architraves; those on the ground floor have cornices, and those on the upper floor have friezes and cornices. The entrances have Ionic porches.
—	22 and 24 Devonshire Road; 53.3883°N 2.9575°W		1860s	A pair of stuccoed symmetrical semi-detached houses with slate roofs. They have three storeys and basements, and each house is in three bays. All the windows are sashes and have architraves; those on the ground floor have cornices, and those on the upper floor have friezes and cornices. In the central bays on the second floor are rectangular oriel windows. The entrances have Ionic porches.
—	26 and 28 Devonshire Road; 53.3881°N 2.9577°W		1860s	A pair of stuccoed symmetrical semi-detached houses with slate roofs. They have three storeys and basements, and each house is in three bays. All the windows are sashes and have architraves; those on the ground floor have cornices, and those on the upper floor have friezes and cornices. The entrances have Ionic porches.
—	38 and 40 Devonshire Road; 53.3876°N 2.9581°W		1850s	Two stuccoed houses with slate roofs. They have three storeys, and each house is in two bays. All the windows are sashes and have architraves. Each house has a single storey canted bay window, the window above having a frieze and a cornice. The entrances have Ionic porches.
—	42–48 Devonshire Road; 53.3874°N 2.9584°W		1850s	Four stuccoed houses with slate roofs. They have three storeys and basements, and each house is in three bays. Nos 46 and 48 project forward. At the top of the houses is a cornice. The windows are sashes with architraves. The houses have enclosed porches with cornices, and entrances with architraves.
—	50 and 52 Devonshire Road; 53.3873°N 2.9586°W		1850s	A pair of stuccoed houses with slate roofs. They have three storeys and basements, and each house is in three bays. At the top is a cornice, and the entrances also have cornices. The windows are sashes with architraves.
—	54 and 56 Devonshire Road; 53.3872°N 2.9586°W		1850s	A pair of stuccoed villas with slate roofs. They have three storeys and basements, and each house is in two gabled bays. In the ground floor are rectangular bay windows. The windows are casements, and the entrances have four-centred heads.
—	58 and 60 Devonshire Road; 53.3872°N 2.9587°W		1850s	A pair of stuccoed villas with slate roofs. They have three storeys and basements, and each house is in two gabled bays. The windows are casements, and the entrances have four-centred heads.
—	62–72 Devonshire Road; 53.3870°N 2.9591°W		1850s	A symmetrical terrace of six stuccoed houses with slate roofs. They have three storeys and basements, and each house is in three bays. At each end of the terrace is a single-storey extension. The windows are sashes, and the entrances within enclosed porches have cornices and architraves.
Turner Memorial Home	Dingle Lane; 53.3804°N 2.9565°W		1882–85	A home for disadvantaged men to the memory of Charles Turner, designed by Alfred Waterhouse. It is built in red sandstone with a red tiled roof, and incorporates a chapel. The building is large and asymmetrical in Gothic style. Features include a projecting timber porch with a clock, a turret with a conical roof, and Perpendicular tracery in the east window of the chapel. Inside is a statue of Turner and his son by Hamo Thornycroft.
Lodge, Turner Memorial Home	Dingle Lane; 53.38070°N 2.95737°W		1884	A lodge designed by Alfred Waterhouse in Gothic style. It is built in stone with a tiled roof, and has an L-shaped plan. The windows are mullioned and transomed.
—	1–27 Egerton Street; 53.3968°N 2.9671°W		c. 1840	A terrace of 14 brick houses with stone dressings and a slate roof. They have two storeys and basements, and each house is in two bays. At the top of the terrace is a frieze and a cornice. The windows have wedge lintels, and most are casements. The entrances have angle pilasters, friezes and cornices.
—	8–32 Egerton Street; 53.3966°N 2.9670°W		c. 1840	A terrace of eleven houses in brick with stone dressings and a slate roof. They have two storeys and basements, and each house is in two bays. Most of the windows are casements with wedge lintels. The entrances have angle pilasters, friezes and cornices.
Peter Kavanagh's pub, 4 and 6 Egerton Street and railings	2–6 Egerton Street; 53.3966°N 2.9674°W		Early 1840s	The public house is stuccoed, and in three bays. The end bay has a two-storey canted bay window with a timber-framed gable. The ground floor has a tiled façade. On the side are four oriel windows.
Railings, gates and gate piers	Falkner Square; 53.39797°N 2.96283°W		1835 (possible)	The gates, gate piers, and railings are in wrought iron. The gates are in the centres of the north, west, and south sides of the gardens, and the piers are in openwork with scrolling. The railings date from the 20th century.
—	1–16 Falkner Square, 17 Sandon Street; 53.3987°N 2.9632°W		1834	A terrace of 17 stuccoed houses. They have two storeys, and each house is in two or three bays. The central house, and houses at the ends, project forward and have canted bay windows. At the top of the terrace is a cornice. The windows are sashes, and the entrances have architraves. One house has an iron balustrade, and others have iron balconies.
—	17–24 Falkner Square; 53.3984°N 2.9617°W		1834	A terrace of eight stuccoed houses with hipped slate roofs. They have three storeys and basements, and each house is in three bays. Nos 21 and 23 project forward under a pediment. At the top of the terrace is a frieze and a cornice. The windows in the first and second floors are sashes. The entrances have Ionic porticos and architraves. There is a continuous first floor iron balcony.
—	25–36 Falkner Square. 25A Grove Street, 19A Sandon Street; 53.3977°N 2.9628°W		c. 1835	A terrace of 13 stuccoed houses with slate roofs. They have two and three storeys, and each house is in three bays. Most of the ground floor windows have architraves, and most of the first floors have balustraded balconies. The details of the individual houses vary.
—	37–40 Falkner Square, 53 Huskisson Street, 78 and 78A Canning Street; 53.3980°N 2.9643°W		c. 1835	A terrace of six stuccoed houses with slate roofs. They have two storeys and basements; some also have attics. They are in two bays, other than the end houses, which have three bays. Each house has a canted bay. At the top of the houses is a cornice. Most if the entrances have Doric porches, and the windows above have balustraded balconies. There are minor differences in the details between the houses.
Drinking fountain and lamp standard	Falkner Street and Crown Street; 53.39993°N 2.95748°W		Late 19th century	The drinking fountain is in granite, stone, and iron. It consists of an octagonal base, four round troughs for dogs, and four scalloped bowls for people. Above these is a plinth carrying a cast iron lamp standard.
—	6 Falkner Street; 53.39993°N 2.96997°W		1820s	A brick house with stone dressings and a slate roof. It has three storeys and a basement, and is in two bays. At the top of the house is a frieze and a cornice. The windows are sashes with wedge lintels. The round-headed entrance has a Doric doorcase with fluted columns and a fanlight.
—	8–14 Falkner Street; 53.3999°N 2.9698°W		1825–50	A terrace of four brick houses with stone dressings and slate roofs. They have three storeys and basements, and are in two bays. At the top of the terrace is a cornice. The windows are sashes with wedge lintels. The round-headed entrances have panelled doorcases.
—	16–24 Falkner Street; 53.3998°N 2.9692°W		1825–50	A terrace of five brick houses with stone dressings and slate roofs. They have three storeys and basements, and are in three bays. The windows have wedge lintels, and most are sashes. The round-headed entrances have Doric doorcases, and most of the houses have first floor balconies.
Belvedere Public House	19–33 Falkner Street, Sugnall Street; 53.4002°N 2.9698°W		1825–50	A terrace of eight houses, including a public house. They are in brick with stone dressings and a slate roof. The houses have three storeys and basements, and most are in two bays; No 33 and the public house have three bays. At the top of the terrace is a frieze and a cornice. The windows are sashes with wedge lintels. The entrances have angle pilasters and entablatures.
—	26 Falkner Street; 53.39972°N 2.96907°W		1820s	A brick house with stone dressings and a slate roof. It has three storeys and a basement, and is in three bays. At the top of the house is a cornice. The windows are sashes with wedge lintels. The round-headed entrance has a Doric doorcase.
—	28 and 30 Falkner Street; 53.3997°N 2.9689°W	—	1820s	Two brick houses with stone dressings and a hipped slate roof. They have three storeys and basements, and each house is in three bays. At the top of the terrace is a cornice. The windows are sashes with wedge lintels. The round-headed entrances have Doric doorcases with fluted columns.
—	32 and 34 Falkner Street; 53.3997°N 2.9688°W		1820s	Two brick houses with stone dressings and a slate roof. They have two storeys and basements, No 32 is in three bays, and No 34 in two bays. At the top of the houses is a cornice. The windows are sashes with wedge lintels. The round-headed entrances have Doric doorcases with fluted columns.
—	36 and 38 Falkner Street; 53.3996°N 2.9686°W		1820s	Two brick houses with stone dressings and a slate roof. They have two storeys and basements, and each house is in two bays. At the top of the houses is a cornice. The windows are sashes with wedge lintels. The round-headed entrances have Doric doorcases. No 38 has a ground floor canted bay window.
—	42–50 Falkner Street, 1 Catharine Street, 2 St Bride Street; 53.3995°N 2.9678°W		1825–50	A terrace of seven brick houses with stone dressings and a hipped slate roof. They have three storeys and basements, and each house is in three bays. At the top of the terrace is a cornice. The windows are sashes with wedge lintels. The round-headed entrances have Doric doorcases with fluted columns.
—	54 Falkner Street; 53.39939°N 2.96707°W		1820s	A brick house with stone dressings and a slate roof. It has two storeys and a roughcast basement, and is in three bays. At the top of the house is a cornice. The windows are sashes with wedge lintels. The round-headed entrance has a Doric doorcase with fluted columns.
—	56 and 58 Falkner Street; 53.3994°N 2.9670°W		1820s	Two brick houses with stone dressings and slate roofs. They have three storeys and basements, and each house is in two bays. At the top of the houses is a frieze and a cornice. The windows are sashes with wedge lintels. The round-headed entrances have Doric doorcases with fluted columns and fanlights.
—	60 and 62 Falkner Street; 53.3994°N 2.9669°W		1820s	Two brick houses with stone dressings and slate roofs. They have three storeys and basements, and each house is in two bays. At the top of the houses is a frieze and a cornice. The windows have wedge lintels; in No 60 they are sashes, and in No 62 they are casements. The round-headed entrances have Doric doorcases with fluted columns. No 60 has a fanlight.
Tunnel entrance	Grafton Street; 53.38069°N 2.97115°W	Disused tunnel entrance for Overhead Railway	1896	This was built for the southern extension of the Liverpool Overhead Railway, and is constructed in stone. It consists of a skewed tunnel entrance between buttresses, with a parapet above. It is the only remaining structure from the Overhead Railway.
Public Offices	High Park Street; 53.3862°N 2.9648°W		1865–66	Public offices designed by Thomas Layland in Italianate style. The front of the building is constructed in red sandstone, and the rest in brick; it has a slate roof. It has one storey, and is in nine bays, the central three bays projecting forward under a pediment. At the top of the building is an entablature. The windows are sashes. The entrance is round-headed with a lion mask keystone. Inside, the central room has decorative plasterwork.
Walls and corner tower, Toxteth Reservoir	High Park Street; 53.38655°N 2.96400°W		1855	The reservoir is no longer in use, but the retaining walls and a tower remain. They were designed by Thomas Duncan. The walls and tower are in stone. The tower is round, with broaches, slits, and a corbelled top.
—	2–12 Huskisson Street, 51 Hope Street; 53.3965°N 2.9708°W		1830s	A terrace of seven stuccoed houses with a hipped slate roof. They have three storeys and basements, and each house is in three bays, other than 51 Hope Street which has seven bays. At the top of the terrace is an entablature. The windows in the ground floor have entablatures and are sashes. In the first floor the windows are casements, and those in the top floor are sashes. The entrances have architraves, friezes and consoled cornices.
—	3 Huskisson Street; 53.3973°N 2.9681°W		1830s	A brick house with stone dressings and a slate roof. It has three storeys and a basement, and is in six bays. The end bay has two storeys and a two-storey canted bay window. The windows are sashes with wedge lintels. The stone porch is on the corner; it has paired pilasters and a cornice, a round-headed window on the front, and an entrance on the side. To the right of the entrance is a stone pier with a lamp standard.
—	14, 16 and 18 Huskisson Street; 53.3966°N 2.9701°W		1830s	Three stuccoed houses with slate roofs. They have three storeys and basements, and each house is in three bays. At the top of the houses is an entablature. The windows are sashes. The entrances have angle pilasters, and most have entablatures.
—	20, 22 and 24 Huskisson Street; 53.3967°N 2.9699°W		1830s	Three stuccoed houses with slate roofs. They have three storeys and basements, and each house is in three bays. At the top of the houses is an entablature. The windows are sashes. The entrance to No 20 has angle pilasters and an entablature. Nos 22 and 24 have Ionic porches, and No 22 has a first floor balcony.
—	25–51 Huskisson Street, 167 and 169 Bedford Street South; 53.3977°N 2.9655°W		1830s	A terrace of 16 brick houses with stone dressings and a slate roof. They have three storeys and basements, and each house is in three bays, other than No 25 which has five bays. At the top of the terrace is a frieze and a cornice. The windows are sashes with wedge lintels. The entrances have Ionic porches, and some houses have first floor balconies.
—	26 and 28 Huskisson Street; 53.3967°N 2.9697°W		1830s	Two stuccoed houses with a slate roof. They have three storeys and basements, and each house is in three bays. Between the second floor windows are flat pilasters supporting an entablature. The windows are sashes. The entrances have Ionic porches, and there are first floor balconies.
—	30 Huskisson Street, 19 Percy Street; 53.3968°N 2.9691°W		1830s	Two stuccoed houses with a slate roof. They have three storeys and basements. 30 Huskisson Street is in five bays, and 19 Percy Street is in three. At the top of the houses is a cornice. Most of the windows are sashes. The entrances have consoled cornices.
—	32–40 Huskisson Street; 53.3968°N 2.9689°W		1830s	A terrace of five stuccoed houses with a slate roof. They have three storeys and basements, and each house is in three bays. At the top of the terrace is a frieze and a cornice. The windows are a mix of sashes and casements. The entrances have angle pilasters and entablatures, and there are first floor balconies.
—	44, 46 and 48 Huskisson Street; 53.3970°N 2.9676°W		1830s	Three brick houses with stone dressings and a slate roof. They have three storeys and basements. No 44 is in four bays, and Nos 46 and 48 are in three. At the top of the houses is a frieze and a cornice. The windows are sashes with wedge lintels. The entrances have Ionic porches.
—	50–56 Huskisson Street; 53.3971°N 2.9673°W		c. 1850s	Four brick houses with stone dressings and a slate roof. They have three storeys and basements, and each house is in two bays; one bay in each house is canted. At the top of the houses is a frieze and a cornice. The windows are sashes with wedge lintels. The entrances have Ionic porches.
—	58–68 Huskisson Street; 53.3971°N 2.9669°W		c. 1840	A terrace of six brick house with stone dressings and slate roofs. They have three storeys and basements, and each house is in two bays. At the top of the terrace is a frieze and a cornice. The first bay of each house has a ground floor canted ground floor bay window. In the first floor are sash windows with angle pilasters, friezes, and cornices. The entrances have Ionic porches. No 60 has casement windows.
—	70 Huskisson Street; 53.39717°N 2.96655°W		c. 1840	A brick house with stone dressings and a slate roof. It has three storeys and a basement, and is in three bays. In the first bay is a stuccoed two-storey canted bay window. The third bay has a projecting ground floor window with angle pilasters, a frieze, and a cornice. All the windows are sashes. The entrance has an Ionic porch, and the first and third bays have first floor balconies.
Florence Institute	Mill Street; 53.3836°N 2.9687°W		1889	A boys' club in Jacobean style, probably designed by Herbert W. Keef. It is in brick with terracotta decoration, and had a slate roof. It has two storeys and a basement, and is in nine bays. Its features include three shaped gables, canted bay windows, and a polygonal turret. It was severely damaged by fire in 1999, which largely destroyed the roof.
St Patrick's Presbytery	22 Park Place; 53.3918°N 2.9721°W		1830s	A brick house with stone dressings and a slate roof. It has three storeys and a basement, and is in three bays. At the top of the house is a cornice. The windows are sashes with wedge lintels. The round-headed entrance has a Doric doorcase with a frieze, with an iron balcony above. There is also an iron Doric porch with slender columns.
—	1–9 Parliament Place; 53.3963°N 2.9702°W		1830s	A terrace of five brick houses with stone dressings and a slate roof. They have three storeys and basements, and each house is in two bays. At the top of the terrace is a frieze and a cornice. with wedge lintels. The round-headed entrances have Doric doorcases with fluted columns.
—	37–43 Peel Street; 53.3837°N 2.9583°W		1850s	A terrace of four stuccoed houses with a slate roof. They have three storeys, and each house is in two bays. At the top of the terrace is a frieze and a cornice. The central two bays and the end bays project forward under pediments. Most of the windows are sashes. In the top floor are panelled pilasters.
Gas lamps	Percy Street; 53.39731°N 2.96969°W		c. 1830	There are five iron gas lamps. They have slender fluted stems, cross arms, and lanterns at the tops.
Gates, gate piers and walls, St Bride's Church	Percy Street; 53.39710°N 2.96938°W		Undated	There are two gates on Percy Street and one on Catharine Street, each has two cast iron piers with pedimented caps. The gates have spear heads.
Fir Grove Flats	1–27 Percy Street; 53.3961°N 2.9693°W		1830s	A terrace of eight brick houses with stone dressings and a slate roof. They have three storeys and basements, and each house is in two bays. At the top of the building is a frieze and a cornice. The windows are sashes with wedge lintels. The entrances have angle pilasters and entablatures.
—	2 and 4 Percy Street; 53.3979°N 2.9701°W		1835	A pair of stone houses with slate roofs. They have two storeys, basements and attics, and each house is in three bays. The central four bays project forward, they have two gables, and contain three pilasters rising to gabled finials. The end bays have a cornice and a panelled parapet. The windows are sashes. The porches are castellated and are decorated with cherubs' heads and heraldic shields.
—	6 Percy Street; 53.3978°N 2.9700°W		c. 1830	A stone house with a slate roof. It has two storeys and a basement, and is in four bays. At the top of the building is a cornice. In the central bays of the first floor is a pilastrade. The windows in the outer bays of the first floor have architraves, friezes and cornices. All the windows are sashes.
Chapel for the Deaf	Princes Avenue; 53.3949°N 2.9643°W		1887	Constructed in red brick with a red tiled roof, this is in two storeys with a later single-storey extension. It has a cross-on-square plan, with an octagonal first floor. On the east side is a round turret. The main part of the building is surmounted by a drum with four-light windows, a louvered bell stage, and a pyramidal roof.
Entrance, Princes Park	Princes Gate; 53.39006°N 2.95516°W		c. 1842	The entrance consists of two concave stone walls with a parapet ending in gate piers with cornices. Between these are two larger rusticated piers with pilasters. Flanked by the piers are a central pair of gates, and single gates at the sides.
Memorial to Richard Vaughan Yates	Princes Park; 53.38936°N 2.95384°W		1858	Richard Vaughan Yates was the founder of the park, and his memorial stands close to the main entrance. It is in polished red granite, and consists of an obelisk on a square base with two drinking fountains in the form of urns.
Florence Nightingale Memorial	Princes Road; 53.39597°N 2.96720°W		1913	This consists of a relief carving in stone of Florence Nightingale and two soldiers. It was designed by Willink and Thicknesse, and carved by C. J. Allen. The carving is flanked by inscribed panels, and walls with seats, which end in piers.
Drinking fountain and lamp standard	Princes Road; 53.39220°N 2.95942°W		Late 19th century	This is in stone and iron, and consists of a square base with four round basins, niches for taps, a rosette frieze and a cornice. The lamp standard is in the form of a Corinthian column, with an upper slender shaft.
Welsh Presbyterian Church	Princes Road; 53.3938°N 2.9638°W		1865–67	A nonconformist chapel designed by W. and G. Audsley in French Gothic style. It is constructed in stone with a slate roof, and has a T-shaped plan. The chapel consists of a nave, transepts, and a southwest steeple with pinnacles and lucarnes. At the east end is a rose window.
St Margaret's Vicarage	3 Princes Road; 53.3956°N 2.9661°W		1868–69	Designed by G. E. Street for St Margaret's Church and connected to it, the vicarage is in brick with stone dressings and a slate roof. It has two storeys and an attic. There are four bays on the front, and three bays on the sides. Most of the windows are sashes, and there are two dormers.
Streatlam Tower	5 Princes Road; 53.3953°N 2.9655°W		1871	A large house in Gothic style designed by W. and G. Audsley. It is constructed in brick with sandstone dressings and slate roofs. The house has three storeys and a basement, and is in three bays. At the front is a round tower with a conical roof, and at the side is a square turret with a pyramidal roof. Other features include mullioned and transomed windows, balconies, a bay window and a half-dormer.
—	1 St Bride Street; 53.39927°N 2.96726°W		1830s	A brick house with stone dressings and a slate roof. It has two storeys, and is in two bays. At the top of the building is a frieze and a cornice. The windows are sashes with wedge lintels. The entrance has a flat surround and a cornice.
—	6 St Bride Street; 53.3992°N 2.9676°W		c. 1830s	A brick warehouse or factory with stone dressings and a slate roof. It is in two and three storeys, and has five bays. At the top of the building is a cornice. The windows are sashes. In the third bay is an elliptical-headed cart entrance.
—	7 St Bride Street; 53.39907°N 2.96728°W		1830s	A brick house with stone dressings and a slate roof. It has two storeys, and is in one bay. The windows are sashes with wedge lintels. The round-headed entrance has a doorcase with panelled pilasters and a fanlight.
—	8–14 St Bride Street; 53.3989°N 2.9676°W		1830s	Four brick houses with stone dressings and slate roofs. They have three storeys and basements, and each house is in two bays. At the top of the building is a cornice. The windows are sashes with wedge lintels. Nos 8 and 10 have round-headed entrances and Doric doorcases with fluted columns; Nos 12 and 14 have flat pilasters and entablatures.
—	9 and 11 St Bride Street; 53.39903°N 2.96730°W		1830s	Two brick houses with stone dressings and slate roofs. They have three storeys and basements, and each house is in one bay. At the top of the building is a cornice. The windows have wedge lintels and are a mix of sashes and casements. The entrances have flat surrounds, cornices and fanlights.
—	13 and 15 St Bride Street; 53.39899°N 2.96731°W		1830s	Two brick houses with stone dressings and slate roofs. They have three storeys and basements, and each house is in one bay. At the top of the building is a cornice. The windows are sashes with wedge lintels. The round-headed entrances have doorcases with panelled pilasters and a fanlight.
—	16, 18 and 20 St Bride Street; 53.3989°N 2.9676°W		1830s	Three brick houses with stone dressings and slate roofs; Nos 16 and 18 are rendered. They have three storeys, and each house is in one bay. The windows are sashes, some with wedge lintels. They have simple doorcases.
—	17, 19 and 21 St Bride Street; 53.39891°N 2.96731°W		1830s	Three brick houses with stone dressings and slate roofs. They have three storeys and basements. Nos 17 and 19 are in one bay, and No 21 has two bays. At the top of the building is a cornice. The windows are sashes with wedge lintels. The round-headed entrances have Doric doorcases.
—	22 and 24 St Bride Street; 53.3987°N 2.9676°W		1830s	A brick house and a shop with stone dressings and a slate roof. They have three storeys, and each is in two bays. At the top of the building is a cornice. The windows are sashes.
—	23, 25 and 27 St Bride Street, 17 Little St Bride Street; 53.3987°N 2.9673°W		1830s	A terrace of four brick houses with stone dressings and a hipped slate roof. They have three storeys and basements, and each is in two bays. The windows are sashes with wedge lintels. The entrances have a doorcases with angle pilasters and cornices.
Walls, railings and gates, St James' Church	St James Place; 53.39464°N 2.97499°W		Late 18th century	The walls and railings are on four sides of the churchyard. There are two entrances on the east and two on the west side. The walls are in brick with stone copings, and the railings and gates are iron. At the entrances are brick and stone piers with dentilled cornices and obelisk finials.
—	9–15 Sandon Street; 53.3989°N 2.9640°W		1830s	Four brick houses with stone dressings and slate roofs. They have three storeys and basements, and each house is in two bays. At the top of the building is a frieze and a cornice. The windows are sashes with wedge lintels. The entrances have angle pilasters and entablatures.
—	21–27 Sandon Street; 53.3973°N 2.9633°W		1830s	Four brick houses with stone dressings and slate roofs. They have three storeys and basements, and each house is in two bays. At the top of the building is a frieze and a cornice. The windows are sashes with wedge lintels. The entrances have flat pilasters and entablatures.
—	24–34 Sandon Street, 100 Huskisson Street; 53.3974°N 2.9639°W		1830s	A terrace of seven brick houses with stone dressings and slate roofs. They have three storeys and basements, and each house is in three bays, other than 100 Huskisson Street, which has five bays. At the top of the building is a frieze and a cornice. The windows are sashes with wedge lintels. The entrances have pilasters and entablatures.
Princes Park Mansions	1–35 Sefton Park Road; 53.3873°N 2.9487°W		1843	A terrace of stuccoed houses with hipped slate roofs, designed by Wyatt Papworth, later converted into flats. The building has four storeys, a basement, and attics that were added later. It extends for 37 bays. Most of the windows are sashes. The central entrance has a Doric porch, above which is a balustrade. The other entrances are round-headed with archivolts.
—	12 Sefton Park Road; 53.3882°N 2.9495°W		1860s	A stone house with two storeys, and in three bays. The central bay projects forward and is canted. Some of the windows are mullioned and transomed; other are sashes and casements. At the top is an embattled parapet between gables.
—	14 Sefton Park Road; 53.3875°N 2.9488°W		1850s	This was originally a stable block, later converted into a house. It is a brick building with stone dressings and a slate roof. It is in two ranges, the south range having six bays, the east bay four bays. The windows and entrances have round heads with flat pilasters, archivolts, and keystones. At the top of the house is a cornice.
—	16 and 18 Sefton Park Road; 53.3874°N 2.9488°W		1860s	Two stuccoed houses with a hipped slate roof. They have two storeys and attic, and each house is in six bays. There is a central single-storey canted projection. The windows are sashes with architraves. No 16 has an enclosed porch, a bay window and a three-bay bow window. Two bays of No 18 project forward and have a flat roof with a cornice.
Grapes Public House and Cain's Brewery	Stanhope Street; 53.3934°N 2.9787°W		1896–1902	A public house and brewery designed for Robert Cain and Sons, designed by James Redford. It is in brick and terracotta, and is a complex building in a number of ranges, with varying numbers of storeys. Its main front has eleven bays, with seven bays on one side, and two on the other. There is much terracotta decoration, including inscriptions, and depictions of beer casks, hops, and barley.
Cavendish Gardens	Sunnyside; 53.3877°N 2.9550°W		c. 1840	A terrace of eight stuccoed houses. They have three storeys and basements, and the terrace is in nine bays. A single-storey porch projects at each end. The windows are sashes with architraves, and there is a first floor balcony. On the sides are giant Corinthian pilasters, and at the rear are giant Corinthian columns and a pediment.
—	1 and 2 Sunnyside; 53.3879°N 2.9562°W		1840s	A pair of symmetrical stuccoed houses with slate roofs. They have three storeys and basements, and each house is in three bays. At the top of the buildings is a cornice, and a frieze in the outer bays. The windows have architraves. Those in the lower two floors are sashes, and those in to top floor are casements. The entrances are round-headed with rusticated surrounds and Doric porches.
—	3 and 4 Sunnyside; 53.3879°N 2.9558°W		1840s	A pair of symmetrical stuccoed houses with slate roofs. They have three storeys and basements, and each house is in three bays. At the top of the buildings is a cornice, and a frieze in the outer bays. The windows have architraves. Those in the lower two floors are sashes, and those in to top floor are casements. The entrances are round-headed with rusticated surrounds and Doric porches. At the rear is a Venetian window.
—	5 and 6 Sunnyside; 53.3878°N 2.9554°W		1840s	A pair of symmetrical stuccoed houses with slate roofs. They have three storeys and basements, and each house is in three bays. At the top of the buildings is a cornice, and a frieze in the outer bays. The windows have architraves. Those in the lower two floors are sashes, and those in to top floor are casements. The entrances are round-headed with rusticated surrounds and Doric porches.
—	7 and 8 Sunnyside; 53.3877°N 2.9550°W		1840s	A pair of symmetrical stuccoed houses with slate roofs. They have two storeys and basements, and each house is in three bays. At the top of the buildings is a cornice, and a frieze in the outer bays. The windows have architraves. Those in the lower two floors are sashes, and those in to top floor are casements. The entrances are round-headed with rusticated surrounds and Doric porches.
Parkside	Ullet Road; 53.3859°N 2.9501°W		1860s	A stuccoed house with a slate roof. It has two storeys and an attic, and is in four bays. The outer bays project forward and have pediments and ground floor bay windows with entablatures. The windows have architraves, and are sashes.
Third Church of Christ Scientist	Upper Parliament Street; 53.3958°N 2.9705°W		1914	A church designed by William Henry Ansell for the Positivist church, built in brick with tile patterning. It consists of a five-bay nave with narrow aisles, a chancel with a canted apse, and a projecting organ loft. Along the clerestory are Diocletian windows. Inside the church is a baldachino with Byzantine columns.
—	24 and 26 Upper Parliament Street; 53.3949°N 2.9724°W		1820s	Two brick houses with stone dressings and slate roofs. They have two storeys and basements, and each house is in two bays. The ground floor and basement are stuccoed. At the top of the buildings is a cornice. The windows are sashes, and the entrances are round-headed.
—	28–34 Upper Parliament Street; 53.3949°N 2.9721°W		1820s	A terrace of four brick houses with stone dressings and slate roofs. They have three storeys and basements, and each house is in two bays. The basements are stuccoed. At the top of the buildings is a cornice. The windows are sashes with wedge lintels, and the entrances are round-headed.
—	33 Upper Parliament Street; 53.3956°N 2.9708°W		1830s	A brick house with stone dressings and a hipped slate roof. It has three storeys and a basement, and is in four bays. At the top of the building is a frieze and a cornice. The windows are sashes with wedge lintels. The round-headed entrance has a doorcase with panelled pilasters.
Day Nursery	36 Upper Parliament Street; 53.3950°N 2.9719°W		1820s	This originated as a stuccoed house with a slate roof. It has three storeys and a basement, and is in five bays. The ground floor windows have architraves; all the windows are sashes. The round-headed entrance has a Doric doorcase and a fanlight.
—	40 Upper Parliament Street; 53.3953°N 2.9710°W		1820s	A brick house with stone dressings and a slate roof. It has three storeys and a basement, and is in five bays. At the top of the building is a cornice. The windows are sashes with wedge lintels. The entrance has an Ionic porch. Above it is a window flanked by pilasters, and a balcony.
—	42 Upper Parliament Street; 53.3953°N 2.9707°W		1820s	A brick house with stone dressings and a slate roof. It has three storeys and a basement, and is in three bays. At the top of the building is a cornice. Some windows are sashes and the others are casements; all have wedge lintels. The entrance is round-headed. To the right is a small extension.
—	44 Upper Parliament Street; 53.3954°N 2.9706°W		1820s	A brick house with stone dressings and a slate roof. It has two storeys and a basement, and is in three bays. At the top of the building is a frieze and a cornice. Some windows are sashes and the others are casements; all have wedge lintels. The entrance has an Ionic porch, and the window above it has an architrave, pilasters, a frieze and a cornice.
—	46 Upper Parliament Street; 53.39541°N 2.97045°W		1820s	A brick house with stone dressings and a slate roof. It has three storeys and a basement, and is in two bays. At the top of the building is a frieze and a cornice. The windows are sashes with wedge lintels. The round-headed entrance has pilasters and an archivolt.
—	48 Upper Parliament Street; 53.39545°N 2.97035°W		1825	A brick house with stone dressings and a slate roof. It has two storeys and a basement, and is in three bays. At the top of the house is a frieze and a cornice. The windows are sashes with wedge lintels. The round-headed entrance has an Ionic doorcase and a fanlight.
—	50 Upper Parliament Street; 53.3955°N 2.9702°W		1820s	A brick house with stone dressings and a slate roof. It has two storeys and a basement, and is in three bays. At the top of the building is a frieze and a cornice. The windows are sashes with wedge lintels. The entrance has an Ionic porch, and the window above it has an architrave, pilasters, a frieze and a cornice.
—	58, 60 and 62 Upper Parliament Street; 53.3956°N 2.9696°W		1820s	Three brick houses with stone dressings and slate roofs. They have two storeys and basements, and each house is in three bays. At the top of the buildings is a cornice. The windows are sashes with wedge lintels, and the entrances have Ionic aedicules.
—	64 Upper Parliament Street; 53.39565°N 2.96944°W		1820s	A stuccoed house with a slate roof. It has three storeys and a basement, and is in three bays. In the first and second floors is a giant pilastrade. The first floor windows have flat pilasters, and cornices. The windows are sashes, and the entrance has a panelled doorcase.
—	66 Upper Parliament Street; 53.39562°N 2.96925°W		1820s	A brick house with stone dressings and a slate roof. It has three storeys and a basement, and is in three bays. At the top of the building is a frieze and a cornice. The windows are casements with wedge lintels. The entrance has an Ionic porch.
—	68 Upper Parliament Street; 53.3957°N 2.9693°W		1820s	A brick house with stone dressings and a slate roof. It has three storeys and a basement, and is in three bays. At the top of the building is a frieze and a cornice. The windows are sashes with wedge lintels. The entrance has angle pilasters and an entablature.
—	70 Upper Parliament Street; 53.3957°N 2.9691°W		1820s	A brick house with stone dressings and a slate roof. It has two storeys and a basement, and is in three bays. The central bay protrudes forward under a pediment. At the top of the building is a frieze and a cornice. The windows are sashes with architraves. The entrance has an Ionic porch.
—	72 and 74 Upper Parliament Street; 53.3957°N 2.9690°W		1820s	Two brick houses with slate roofs. They have two storeys and basements, and each house is in three bays. The windows are sashes with wedge lintels. The entrance to No 72 has an Ionic porch; the doorway of No 74 has angle pilasters and an entablature.
—	79–109 Upper Parliament Street, 65 and 67 Catharine Street, 180 Bedford Street South; 53.3963°N 2.9669°W		1830s	A terrace of 19 brick houses with stone dressings and slate roofs. They have three storeys and basements, and each house is in three bays. The windows are sashes with wedge lintels. The entrances have Ionic porches, and some of the houses have first floor balconies.
Princes Park Hospital	96 Upper Parliament Street; 53.3960°N 2.9664°W		c. 1830s	This originated as a brick house with stone dressings and a slate roof. It has three storeys and a basement, and is in five bays. At the top of the building is a frieze and a cornice. The windows are sashes with architraves. The entrance has an Ionic porch with paired columns, and there are two first floor balconies.
—	100 Upper Parliament Street; 53.39615°N 2.96566°W		1830s	A brick house with stone dressings and a slate roof. It has three storeys and a basement, and is in three bays. At the top of the building is a cornice. The windows are sashes with architraves. The entrance also an architrave.
—	140 Upper Parliament Street; 53.3965°N 2.9633°W		1830s	A brick house with stone dressings and a slate roof. It has three storeys and a basement, and is in four bays. At the top of the building is a frieze and a cornice. The windows are sashes. The entrance has a doorcase, a frieze and a cornice.
Falkner Terrace	155–177 Upper Parliament Street; 53.3970°N 2.9624°W		1831	A terrace of eleven stuccoed houses with slate roofs. They have three storeys and basements, and each house has three bays. Nos 161–167 project forward, and have a pilastrade and balconies on the first floor. At the top of the building is a frieze, a cornice, and a parapet. The windows are sashed. The entrances are paired, and have flat pilasters and entablatures.
—	248 and 250 Upper Parliament Street; 53.3976°N 2.9556°W		1820s	Two stuccoed houses with slate roofs. They have three storeys and basements, and each house is in three bays. In the first and second floors is a giant pilastrade and a balustrade. The first floor windows have angle pilasters. The windows are sashes, and the entrances are flanked by paired pilasters.
—	268 and 270 Upper Parliament Street; 53.3978°N 2.9546°W		1820s	Two brick houses with stone dressings and slate roofs. They have three storeys and basements, and each house is in three bays. At the top of the buildings is a cornice. The windows are sashes with wedge lintels. The entrances are round-headed with pilasters and archivolts.
Bellerive Building	Windermere Terrace; 53.3867°N 2.9489°W		1860s	A stuccoed house with a slate roof. It has two storeys, and is in three bays. In the second bay is a tower with a pyramidal roof. The third bay projects forward, and has a two-storey canted bay window with a hipped roof. In the first bay is a porch with a round-headed entrance. Above this is a frieze, a cornice, and a balustraded parapet with a statue of Jesus.
Lodge, Bellerive Building	Windermere Terrace; 53.3869°N 2.9485°W		1860s	A stuccoed lodge with a hipped roof in two storeys. It has a two-storey curved bow window. All the windows are sashes.
Street lamps	Windermere Terrace; 53.38719°N 2.94772°W		Late 19th century	These are nine iron street lamps with fluted stems, cross arms, and lanterns with ventilators.
—	1–4 Windermere Terrace; 53.3872°N 2.9496°W		1850s	A terrace of four stuccoed houses with a hipped roof in three storeys and basements. The central bay projects forwards. Most windows have architraves, and are sashes. At the top of the buildings is an entablature and a parapet. Within the enclosed porches are round-headed entrances. At the rear are two bow windows with balconies, between which is a verandah.
Windermere House	5 Windermere Terrace; 53.3870°N 2.9495°W		1850s	A stuccoed house with a hipped roof. It has two storeys, and is in four bays. The second bay projects forward and has a pediment. The windows have architraves, and are sashes. There is a tetrastyle Ionic porch; the entrance to the house is round-headed with a tympanum.
Toxteth Library	Windsor Street; 53.3950°N 2.9715°W		1900–02	A branch library designed by Thomas Shelmerdine, and constructed in red brick with stone dressings and a slate roof. It is in a single storey with an attic. There are five bays on both Windsor Street and on Upper Parliament Street. On each face are two Venetian windows. The round-headed doorway is flanked by Ionic columns and pilasters, and above it is a projecting hood. In the centre of the roof is a lead cupola.
Sir John Bent Memorial	Toxteth Park Cemetery; 53.3934°N 2.9392°W		1857	Funerary monument made of ashlar in classical revival syle. Sir John Bent was owner of Bent's Brewery and Mayor of Liverpool, 1850.
Eleanora and William Gillespie Obelisk	Toxteth Park Cemetery; 53.3938°N 2.9387°W		1871	Funerary monument made in sandstone ashlar with pink granite dressings and white marble panels in a Gothic style.
Hetherington Memorial	Toxteth Park Cemetery; 53.3950°N 2.9394°W		1871	Funerary monument made of sandstone ashlar in an Islamic style. Square single-cell enclosure with square columns and bases and plain pointed arches with a square pointed-arched dome above.
Muspratt Memorial	Toxteth Park Cemetery; 53.3936°N 2.9403°W		1871	Funerary monument 1871 in grey granite with white marble medallion. Square base with plain plinth to inscribed pedestal.

== See also ==
Architecture of Liverpool
