= George Christensen (disambiguation) =

George Christensen (born 1978) is a former Australian federal politician.

George Christensen may also refer to:

- George Christensen (American football) (1909–1968), American football player and businessman

== See also ==
- George Christian (disambiguation)
