= Toxteth Town Hall =

Municipal building in Toxteth, Merseyside, England

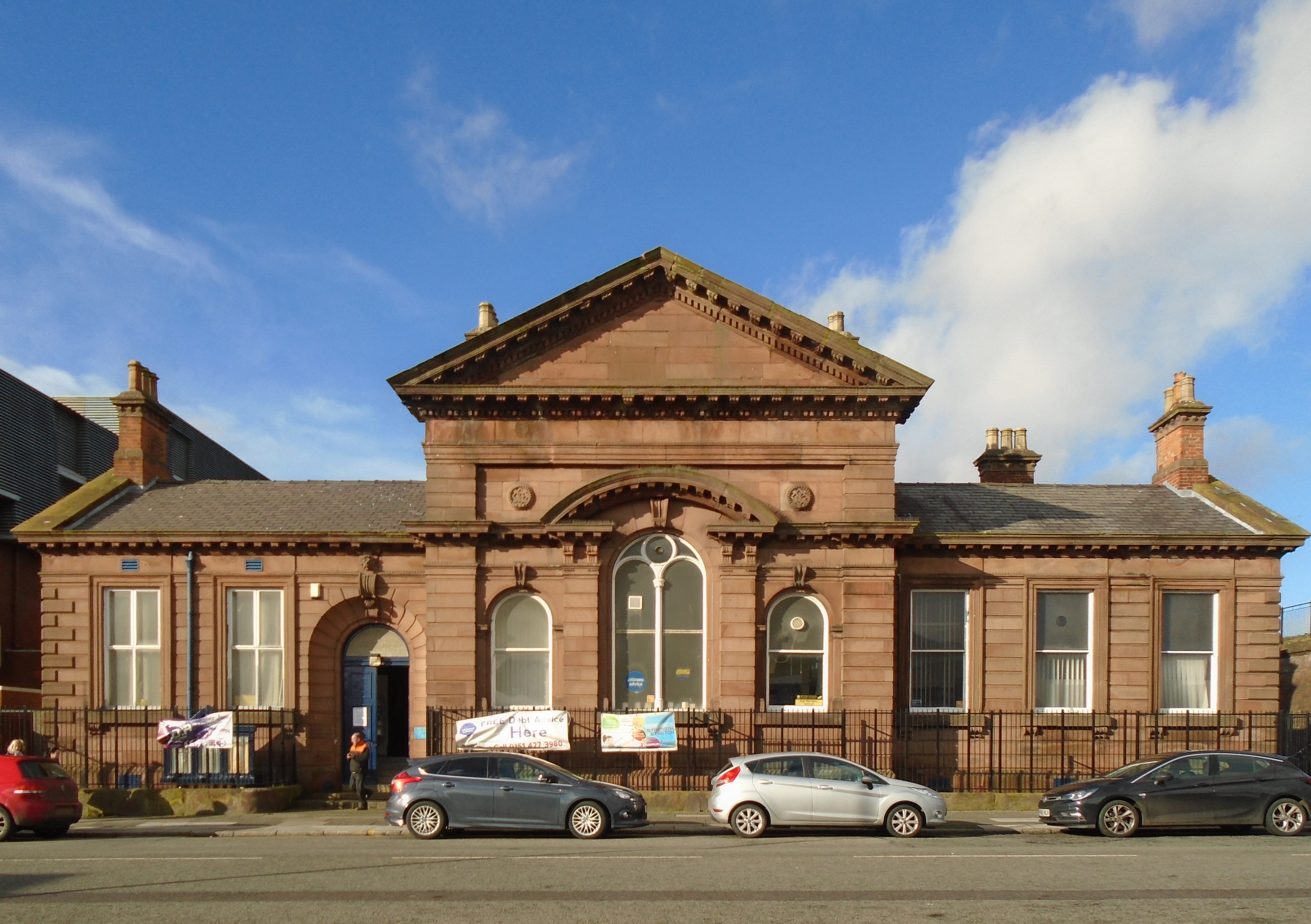
- Toxteth Town Hall

- Shown in Merseyside
- 53.3861°N 2.9648°W
- Location: High Park Street, Toxteth

History
- Built: 1866

Site notes
- Architect: Thomas Layland
- Architectural style: Italianate style

Listed Building – Grade II
- Official name: Public Offices (now Health and Social Security)
- Designated: 14 March 1975
- Reference no.: 1075218

Toxteth Town Hall, formerly known as Toxteth Park Public Offices, is a municipal building in High Park Street, Toxteth, Merseyside, England. The structure, which currently operates as a community centre, is a grade II listed building.

== History ==
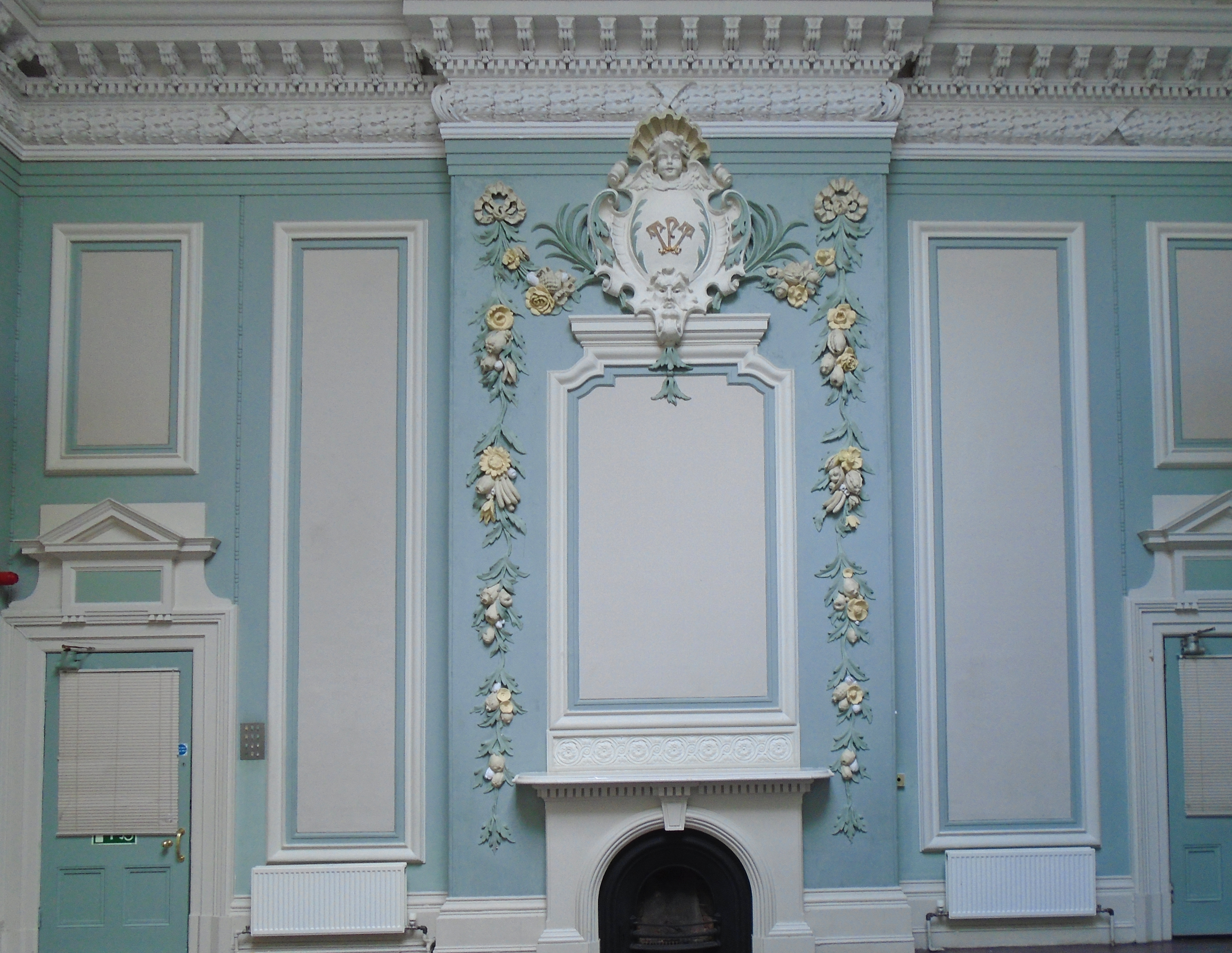
The main assembly hall inside the building

Following significant population growth, largely associated with the proximity of the township to the Liverpool Docks, an improvement act for Toxteth Park, which contemplated the construction of public offices, was enacted in 1842 and a local board of health was formed in 1856. One of the first actions of the new board was to commission purpose-built public offices: the site they selected in High Park Street was in the midst of an extensive developing residential area.

The new building was designed by Thomas Layland in the Italianate style, built in red sandstone at a cost of £6,500 and opened as the Toxteth Park Public Offices in 1866. The design involved a symmetrical main frontage with nine bays facing onto High Park Street; the central section of three bays, which slightly projected forward, featured a tall round headed window with an architrave flanked by pilasters and brackets supporting an open segmental pediment. The outer bays of the central section contained smaller round headed widows and the whole section was surmounted by an entablature, a modillioned cornice and a modillioned pediment. There was a round headed doorway with a fanlight and a lion mask keystone in the right-hand bay of the left-hand section; the other bays in the two outer sections were fenestrated with sash windows. Internally, the principal room was the main assembly hall which featured decorative plasterwork involving garlands and a plaque depicting a stag which was donated by the Earl of Sefton.

The building continued to serve as the meeting place of the parish council until it was abolished in 1922. The building was used as a registry office for the remainder of the first half of the 20th century: births registered in the building included that of Ringo Starr in July 1940. The building was then used by the Liverpool Police during the Second World War and was subsequently occupied by the Department of Health and Social Security until it fell vacant in 1994.

In July 1997, a long leasehold interest in the building was sold to a specially-formed charity, the Dingle Multi Agency Centre. The charity then initiated a programme of refurbishment works, financed by the Heritage Lottery Fund and the Pilgrim Trust, in 2003. After the building had re-opened as the Toxteth Town Hall Community Centre, the Prince of Wales toured the building during his visit to Liverpool in April 2007.

== See also ==
- Grade II listed buildings in Liverpool-L8
