= Michael Showers =

British drug dealer (born 1945)

- Born: 14 July 1945 (age 81); Liverpool, England
- Occupation: Former gangster

Michael Showers (born 14 July 1945) is a British convicted drug trafficker from Liverpool.

== Early life ==
Showers was sent to Borstal aged 17 in 1963 for his part in a stabbing. After being released, Showers started his criminal career as a bank robber. Showers was a Toxteth community leader around the time of the 1981 Toxteth riots, and in the wake of the riots formed the Toxteth-based Liverpool 8 Defence committee. Showers is the father to 9 children. He is the older brother of Delroy Showers. The brothers have each been imprisoned after being accused of separate high-profile international drugs plots. His 14 year sentence was thought to have begun in Randers, Denmark, but in 2014 the Foreign Office confirmed he was moved back to the UK to finish his jail term. In 1994, Delroy Showers escaped from the Danish prison. Delroy Showers has one son, Rolando Gianni Showers, living in Amsterdam, the Netherlands. Rolando Showers is a well-known figure in the European underworld with contacts in South America, Spain, the Netherlands, Germany and other international countries as his father Delroy Showers.

== Criminal career ==
Showers was jailed for 20 years in 1991 after attempting to negotiate a route for £2m worth of high-grade heroin to enter the UK. During the 1990s, his plot was thwarted by a police sting called "Operation Rain Man". He was caught following the elaborate operation between British police and HM Customs and Excise and their counterparts on the Indian sub-continent which led to the seizure of 12 kg of the drug.

In 2010, he was arrested in Turkey by a joint operation by the Turkish Police and the British Serious Organised Crime Agency (SOCA), the drugs baron was reprimanded after being linked to alleged cannabis smuggling. Showers has since been released.
