= Royal Park Hotel, Toxteth =

Hotel in Toxteth, Liverpool, England

Coordinates: 53.38832°N 2.96435°W

The Royal Park Hotel was a three-storey, handsome public house and hotel situated on the corner of Admiral Street and North Hill Street, Toxteth, Liverpool, England. It was built in the 1860s^{1} as a three-storey building possibly by the brewer Walkers of Warrington. A long bar ran the length of the pub curving at the end; two other rooms had no bar and were served by waiter service, which disappeared towards the end of the pub's life. The name of the pub probably refers to the fact that Toxteth was a Royal Park – although in the interwar years the name changed to the Admiral Hotel.^{2} In the 1871 England census, it is recorded as being at 2 Admiral Street, Toxteth Park and in Ordnance Survey maps of the period it is marked as a PH on the corner of Admiral Street and North Hill Street – with a Freemasons' hall adjacent to it at 80 North Hill Street. However, in some Censuses the hotel is recorded as being at 84 North Hill Street.

A history of the Ancient Briton Lodge records that "some time prior to 1877 a hotel had been built on the corner of Admiral Street and North Hill Street called the Masonic Arms" – although no other record of that name has yet been found.

== Walker's Warrington Ales ==
The census records show that the pub was managed but there is no indication who the owners were; however the photograph from the 1920s shows that the pub was selling Walker's Warrington Ales – beers brewed by Peter Walker & Sons. Currently it is unknown whether they were the original owners.

EDIT: The Original owners of The Royal Park Hotel, was Robert Cain & Sons, who sold the brewery to Peter Walker & Son in 1921, to become Walker Cain Ltd : 1921

== Landlords ==
John Roberts is recorded as the Licensed Victualer - along with his wife Harriet - in 1871. Emily Marshall is noted as a Boarder indicating that rooms were indeed used for boarding. Elizabeth Davies is recorded as the Barmaid, and there are two servants: one had the task of being the billiard marker indicating that this was a pub activity at the time - a billiard marker kept the players' scores and chalked them on a scoring board. His duties could also include allocating tables, cues, chalk, and dealing with refreshments. In Toxeth Park Cemetery there is one monumental inscription that mentions the Royal Park Hotel: "In loving memory of John ROBERTS, of Marford Hill Gresford and formerly of the Royal Park Hotel in this city who died 21st August 1881, aged 51 years. Also of Harriet, wife of the above who died 7th May 1886, aged 70 years."^{3}

Roberts was born in Flintshire, North Wales and his arrival in Liverpool was no doubt part of the mass movement of people from rural Wales to the greater prosperity in Liverpool. So huge was the influx into Liverpool that Welsh, Scottish and Irish immigrants accounted for over 30% of Liverpool's population by the mid 19th century. Liverpool had become a significant port, the "Gateway to the Atlantic" and was a commercial centre second only to London. The allure of continued employment in the docks, in shipping and allied industries was overwhelming. From the mid to the end of the 19th century, Liverpool's population more than doubled from just under 300,000 to over 700,00. At this time there were over 50,000 Welsh people living in the city and it was known as the Capital of North Wales. Toxteth was one of the districts they settled and to accommodate this influx of people rows of terraced houses were quickly built that subsequently became known as the Welsh Streets. One reference claims that in Toxteth, from 1831 to 1877, the local population had grown from 24,000 to 117,000.

In the 1891 Census, Robert Fishlock had yet to work at the Royal Park but he was recorded as living on the Scotland Road with his occupation as Public House Manager. He had been born in Brentford, Middlesex. By 1894 (see below) he had moved to the Royal Park.

Richard Burnett is recorded as the 'Public House Manager' in the 1901 census. Aged 28, he had been born in Liverpool and was living at the Royal Park with his wife and two children. (NB: in this Census, the address is 84 North Park Street.)

The 1911 Census has Joseph Pantoll aged 57 as the Brewery's Manager at the Royal Park. He was ex-Navy and had been born in Plymouth. His address is given as 84 North Park Street rather than Admiral Street but he also records two people resident at 2 Admiral Street: Ann Cameron, an 83-year-old widow and her granddaughter Margaret Cameron whose occupation is noted as a restaurant waitress. Perhaps she was working as a waitress at the Royal Park.

Another 'Welsh' landlord was Henry Thomas. His family too had come from North Wales, moving to Liverpool in the 1830s. He was born just a few streets away in Wynnstay Street in 1891. Before the First World War he had been a mariner and had ended up in New Zealand. At the start of the War he joined the New Zealand Expeditionary Force, fought in Egypt, Gallipoli and France before returning to Liverpool in 1920 to take over the running of what had now been renamed as the Admiral Hotel. Here he lived with his family: wife Dorothy and two sons, Roy and Paul Thomas.

The pub's name varied over the years (licensee in brackets)^{4}:

- 1871: Royal Park Hotel (John Roberts)
- 1881: Royal Park Hotel (Mrs Mary Webster)
- 1894: Royal Park Hotel (Robert Fishlock)
- 1911: Royal Park Hotel (Joseph Pantoll)
- 1926: The Admiral Hotel (Henry Thomas)
- 1927: The Admiral Hotel (John Hughes)
- 1934: The Admiral Hotel (Wm Henry Taylor)
- 1938: The Royal Park Hotel (Wm Henry Taylor)
- 1941 Royal Park Hotel (Cyril Burns)
- 1946: The Royal Park Hotel (Cyril Burns)
- 1955: Royal Park Hotel (Edward John Cook)
- 1966: Royal Park Hotel (but no landlord noted)

== Demolition ==
It is thought that it was during the mid-1970s that the pub was demolished, along with all the properties on the block including the adjacent Toxteth Masonic Hall, leaving an open space that was originally tarmac and part of a school. The school was demolished and the space was converted to football pitches in 2004 but then became derelict by 2010. In 2012 they were renovated and reopened as the Admiral Park Recreation Ground^{5}.

== Sources ==
1. Kelly's Directory of Liverpool and Lancs 1869

2. A History of the Royal & Ancient Park of Toxteth, R. Griffiths Original edition 1907

3. Toxteth Park Cemetery Inscriptions

4. Various Kelly's Directories for Liverpool & Birkenhead as per the years stated. Printed and Published by Kelly & Co, Ltd. High Holborn, London

5. http://www.plusgroupltd.org.uk/cheshire/article.asp?id=685
