= George Llewellyn Christian =

American politician and Confederate soldier

George L. Christian
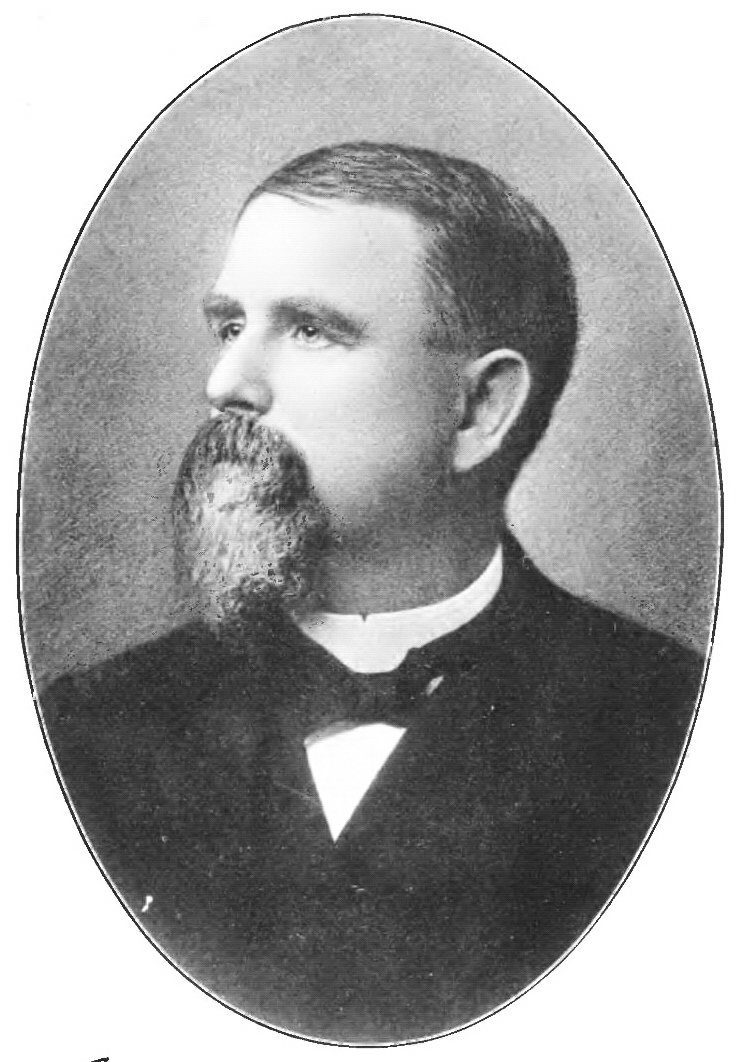
- Born: George Llewellyn Christian; April 13, 1841; Charles City County, Virginia, U.S.
- Died: July 26, 1924
- Resting place: Hollywood Cemetery
- Other name: George Christian
- Education: Northwood Academy; Taylorsville Academy; University of Virginia
- Occupations: Soldier, judge, councilman
- Political party: Democratic
- Spouse(s): Ida Morris; Emma Christian
- Children: Cassie Claudia (daughter), Morris H. (son), and George L., Jr. (son), Stuart (son), William (son), and Frank (son)
- Relatives: Edmund Thomas Christian (father); Tabitha Rebecca Graves (mother)
- Military career
- Allegiance: Confederate States
- Branch: Confederate army
- Service years: 1861-1864
- Rank: Sergeant
- Unit: Second Company of the Richmond Howitzers
- Conflicts: American Civil War: Battle of Spottsylvania Court House (WIA)
- Other work: Grand Camp of Confederate Veterans of Virginia

George Llewellyn Christian (April 13, 1841 – July 26, 1924) was a Confederate soldier in the American Civil War who later became a judge and city councilman in Richmond, Virginia.

== Early life and education ==
Born on April 13, 1841, in Charles City County, Virginia, Christian was the son of Edmund Thomas Christian and Tabitha Rebecca Graves, his wife. His father's ancestor, Thomas Christian, settled in Charles City County, Virginia, in 1687, having come from Isle of Man. His grandfather was Turner Christian, who was a brother of Henry Christian, who was a captain in the American Revolutionary War. On his mother's side, Christian's ancestors were of English descent. His early education was obtained in private schools, and in the Northwood and Taylorsville Academies of Charles City county.

== Career ==
=== American Civil War ===
In 1861, when he was twenty years old, Christian enlisted into the Confederate army as a private in the Second Company of the Richmond Howitzers, with which he served until May 12, 1864, when he was severely wounded near the Bloody Angle at the Battle of Spottsylvania Court House. At that time he was a sergeant of the company. He lost one leg and a part of the other foot, and as the result of these wounds was incapacitated and rendered unfit for further service on the battlefield.

=== Judiciary ===
Christian entered the University of Virginia in 1864, where he remained for one session. Upon leaving the university, having lost everything in the war, he entered the clerk's office of the circuit court of the city of Richmond, Virginia, and in 1870 began the practice of his profession. From 1872 until 1878 he was clerk of the court of appeals.

From 1878 to 1883 he was judge of the Hustings Court of the city of Richmond.

=== Other positions ===
He was president of the Richmond City Chamber of Commerce, of the city council of Richmond, of the City Bar Association, of the National Bank of Virginia, and of the Virginia State Insurance Company. He was also vice-president of the Union Theological Seminary, and chairman of the History Committee of the Grand Camp of Confederate Veterans of Virginia.

=== Writings ===
Christian was a member of the Grand Camp of Confederate Veterans of Virginia, and wrote extensively about the American Civil War. His wrote the Report on the Conduct of the War, was released on October 11, 1900, and was a tribute to the cause of the Confederacy during the war. He wrote about former U.S. presidents John Tyler and Abraham Lincoln in Capitol Disaster and Confederate Experiences.

== Later life and death ==
Christian died on July 26, 1924. He was buried in Hollywood Cemetery.

== Personal life ==
Christian was a Democrat. His first wife was Ida Morris, by whom he had three children: Cassie Claudia, Morris H., and George L., Jr. His second wife was Emma Christian, by whom he had three children: Stuart, William, and Frank. He lived in Richmond, Virginia.
