= High Park Reservoir =

Disused Victorian-era reservoir in Liverpool, England

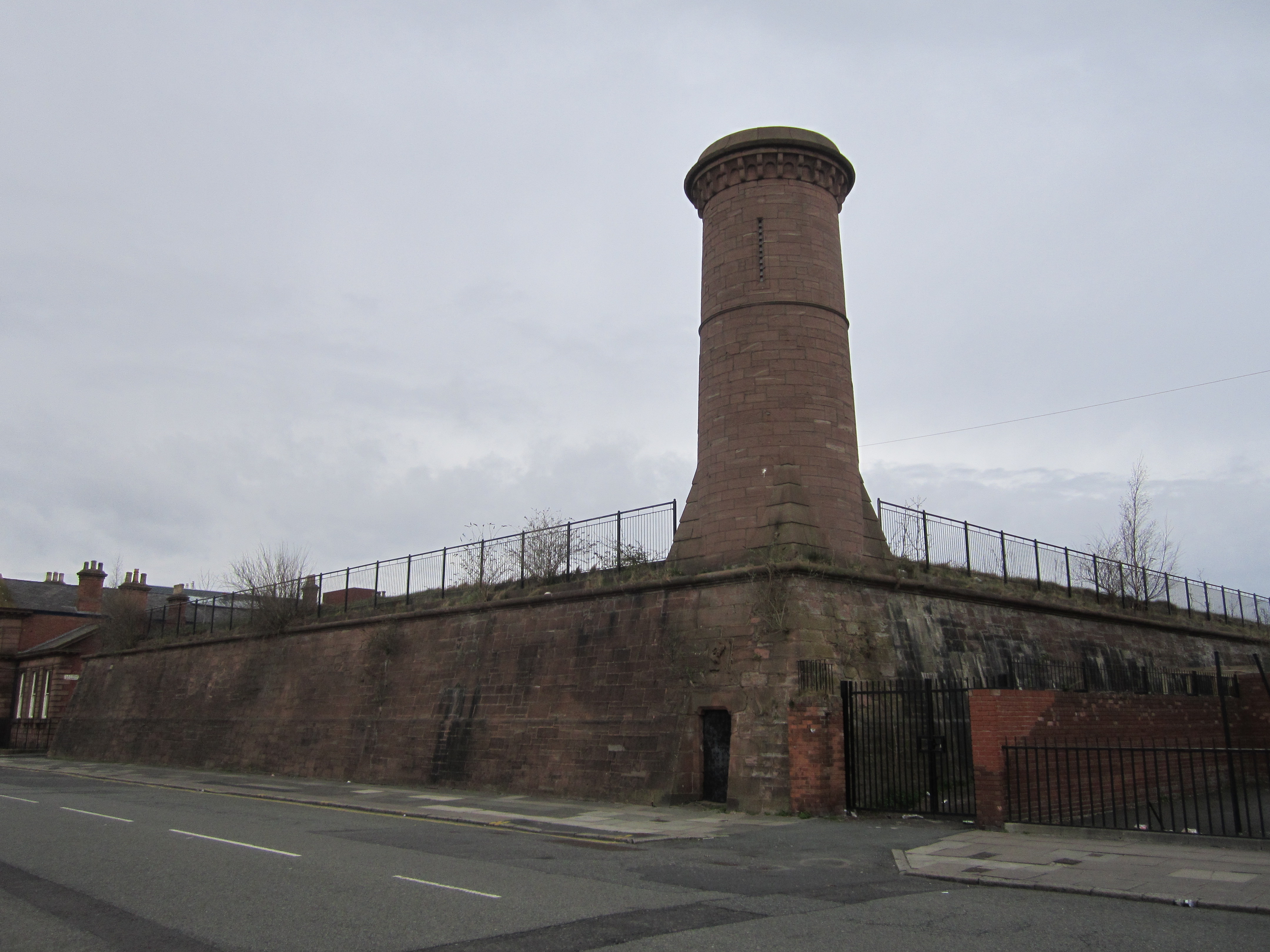
- High Park Reservoir, as seen in 2013
- Interactive map of the High Park Reservoir area
- Alternative names: Toxteth Reservoir

General information
- Status: Not used for water storage since 1997, now used as an events space
- Type: Reservoir
- Classification: Grade II listed
- Location: High Park Street, Toxteth, L8, Liverpool, England
- Coordinates: 53.3863°N 2.9643°W
- Opened: 1853
- Closed: 1997 (for use as a reservoir)

Dimensions
- Other dimensions: 53.5 m (176 ft) x 67 m (220 ft)

Technical details
- Material: Sandstone and brick

Design and construction
- Architect: Thomas Duncan

Other information
- Public transit access: Brunswick railway station

References
- Historic England, ref. 1279691

High Park Reservoir (also known as Toxteth Reservoir) is a disused reservoir in the Toxteth district of Liverpool, England. Water for the reservoir was enclosed in a brick-built, sandstone-clad building. The building still stands and is opened to visitors for special occasions and events.

== History ==
Opening in 1853, the reservoir provided fresh water to the rapidly growing city of Liverpool. This was especially important given the prevalence of cholera at the time. The reservoir's height above parts of the city meant that it also provided a head of water for fighting fires at the city's docks.

Capable of holding approximately 2 million gallons, it was fed with fresh water from Rivington Pike in the West Pennine Moors and a spring in the Lodge Lane area of Liverpool. The building served as a reservoir for 140 years before its closure in 1997. It was given Grade II listed building status in June 1985.

After a period of being left unused, the building has been used as a community space and events venue. It is not normally open to visitors, but there is an annual Heritage Day Open Event that allows people to see inside. The building has proven useful as a location for filming, and has been used in Peaky Blinders.

As part of Liverpool's Biennual celebrations in 2016, the building was used as an art installation for a piece by Rita McBride, called Portal. In 2018 it was again used for an installation, called AURORA.

== Architecture ==
Historic England describe the building as: "Retaining wall and corner tower to reservoir. 1855. Probably T. Duncan. Snecked stone. Battered wall with top roll moulding, approximately 53.5m x 67m. Entrance with studded door at right hand end of main facade; plaque with Liver bird over. Round tower above has broaches, slits and corbelled top."

The building has a flat roof, covered in grass, which offers good all round views of the city.

== See also ==
Architecture of Liverpool
