= George William Christian =

George William Christian (1872 -1924) was a Black British merchant who founded and grew his business operations in West Africa during the region's colonial era. He co-managed the firm, G. W. Christian and Co with his brother, Alexander Christian before it was sold to the Royal Niger Company in 1918. The firm retained its trading name until 1930.

== Life ==
=== Early life ===
Christian was born in Toxteth, Liverpool to the family of Jacob and Octavia Christian. His father was born in Antigua migrated to Liverpool when he was fifteen years old. Jacob married Octavia Caulfield, a Liverpool native and they had three boys and two girls. Jacob worked was a seaman when George was born in 1872 and later switched careers to trade in timber. When George Christian was fifteen his father recommended him and his brother to the firm of John Holt and Co, the proprietor of John Holt had spent considerable time in West Africa and built a thriving trading and shipping operation in the region. Christian was earmarked as a clerk and posted to work in West Africa. In Africa, he lived in a mud built structure behind one of John Holt's stores.

=== Career in West Africa ===
In 1904 George. he established a business on his own account in German Cameroons. German colonist were unable to distinguish between a Black British mulatto and a native African, George was fined for not registering a title to his land as required for all Africans living in German Cameroons and was later expelled.

After his exit from German Cameroons, he transferred his operations to Nigeria. The business operated stores along the routes of the Niger in coastal cities of the Burutu and Forcados, Onitsha, Lokoja and Idah. In 1911, the operations was incorporated in Liverpool as G. W. Christian and Co. and operations in the city was managed by his brother, Alexander. As the business grew the firm was able to hire both Africans and Europeans as assistants and clerks. The firm was acquired by The Royal Niger Company in 1918.

In Nigeria, Christian and his wife primarily resided in Onitsha.
