= List of extant works by Culshaw and Sumners =

Culshaw and Sumners was a firm of English architects and surveyors who practised in Liverpool in the 19th and early 20th centuries. It was founded in the 1830s by William Culshaw (1807–74), who was joined by Henry Sumners (1825–95) in 1861. Their partnership was dissolved in 1873 when Sumners was replaced by Culshaw's son, Alfred (1849/50–1926), who continued to run the practice until 1916. The practice carried out much mundane and routine work, but also designed new buildings, some of which are considered to be notable. Their output included office blocks, warehouses, domestic properties, workhouses, churches, and a hospital.

This list includes the existing buildings of the architects that have been listed, and/or are included in the Buildings of England series. The buildings designed by Culshaw alone are denoted by † in the "Name" column, those of Sumners by ‡, and the single work of William Culshaw & Son by ¶.

== Key ==
Grade	Criteria
Grade II*	Particularly important buildings of more than special interest.
Grade II	Buildings of national importance and special interest.

== Works ==
Name	Location	Image	Date	Notes	Grade
68 and 70 Upper Parliament Street †	Liverpool; 53.3957°N 2.9691°W		1841	Two houses in a terrace; designed for the shipbuilder Thomas Royden.	II
16 and 18 Croxteth Road	Liverpool; 53.3890°N 2.9512°W		1843	A pair of semi-detached houses in Italianate style.	II
Abbey National building †	Ranelagh Street, Liverpool; 53.4051°N 2.9805°W		1843	A building in Neoclassical style, faced in stucco, with giant pilasters.	—
St James' Church †	St James Place, Toxteth, Liverpool; 53.3943°N 2.9748°W		1846	Culshaw replaced the roof of the church which was built in 1774–75 by Cuthbert Brown.	II*
Frankby Hall †	Frankby, Wirral, Merseyside; 53.3689°N 3.1395°W		1846–47	Built as a castellated and turreted house; in 1938–39 converted into cemetery chapels.	—
Offices †	Tempest Hey, Liverpool; 53.4085°N 2.9908°W		1849	An office block for the bankers Messrs Rowlinson.	—
3 Huskisson Street	Liverpool; 53.3973°N 2.9681°W		1850s–60s	A house built in 1839 for Revd John Jones, altered for Isaac Hadwen junior.	—
Ormskirk workhouse †	Ormskirk, Lancashire; 53.5666°N 2.8761°W		1851–53	Built for the Ormskirk Poor Law Union, consisting of an octagonal centre with three arms. Later incorporated into Ormskirk Hospital.	—
St Luke's Church †	Formby, Sefton, Merseyside; 53.5521°N 3.0874°W		1852–55	A new church built close to the site of an ancient chapel.	II
Baltic Fleet public house †	Wapping, Liverpool; 53.3986°N 2.9867°W		1853	Culshaw designed the first phase.	II
Maer Hall †	Maer, Staffordshire; 52.9420°N 2.3109°W		1853	The house dates from the middle of the 17th century. Culshaw added a wing for William Davenport, which has since been demolished.	II
St Luke's Church †	Farnworth, Widnes, Cheshire; 53.3844°N 2.7273°W		1855	Restoration, including rebuilding the north aisle and arcade.	II*
Warehouse †	66 Bridgewater Street, Liverpool; 53.3964°N 2.9829°W		1857	One of Culshaw's few surviving warehouses.	—
Mossley Vale †	North Mossley Hill Road, Mossley Hill, Liverpool; 53.3821°N 2.9231°W		1858	A house, later used as the music and arts department of Liverpool College.	—
Furniture workshops and showrooms ‡	Nelson Street, Liverpool; 53.3999°N 2.9769°W		c. 1858	A building in Neoclassical style, with elaborate stucco.	—
Holly Lodge †	West Derby, Liverpool; 53.4269°N 2.9166°W		1860	Addition made to a house built about 1830, consisting of wing in Italianate style, with a belvedere tower and a billiards room. Since 1912 it has been used as a school.	—
Liverpool Savings Bank †	Bold Street, Liverpool; 53.4024°N 2.9765°W		1861	Originally the head office of the savings bank, this is a four-storey building in Italianate style.	—
16–17 Beach Lawn ‡	Waterloo, Merseyside; 53.4774°N 3.0362°W		1861	Two houses in High Victorian Gothic style built for Dr Drysdale.	II
Abbots Lea †	Beaconsfield Road, Woolton, Liverpool; 53.3820°N 2.8824°W		1862	A large Gothic-style house, in red sandstone, with a 20th-century expansion.	—
19 Abercromby Square †	Liverpool; 53.4033°N 2.9644°W		1862–63	A building of seven bays, and higher than its neighbours, this was designed for C. K. Prioleau. It was altered in the 1880s to become the Bishop's Palace, and in the 20th century became the centre for the Department of Education and the Department of Corporate Communications of the University of Liverpool. It is described as "perhaps the grandest surviving 19th-century house in the city centre".	II
National Bank	Cook Street, Liverpool; 53.4062°N 2.9892°W		1863	A building in five bays, in Italianate style.	—
West Derby Union workhouse ‡	Walton, Liverpool		1863	A symmetrical building in three storeys, with 23 bays, plus four-bay wings at each end, and a central clock tower. Later used as Walton Hospital; from 2005 converted into apartments.	II
Berey's Buildings ‡	Bixteth Street, Liverpool; 53.4090°N 2.9920°W		1864	An office block in ten bays by six bays, constructed in red brick with sandstone bands and a grey stone basement. It has Gothic features, plus square-headed windows. The building has been converted into flats.	—
St John's Church †	Waterloo, Merseyside; 53.4766°N 3.0298°W		1864–65	A new church in Early English style.	II
Sodylt Hall †	Dudleston, Shropshire; 52.95834°N 2.9755°W		1865	Additions to a house dating from the 18th century.	—
Quarry Bank House	Allerton, Liverpool; 53.3827°N 2.9012°W		1866–67	A house in Gothic style, later developed as part of Calderstones School.	II
Christ Church, Toxteth Park	Linnet Lane, Liverpool; 53.3848°N 2.9486°W		1867–71	A new church in Decorated style with a steeple.	II
North Lodge and gates	Gyrn Castle, Llanasa, Flintshire, Wales; 53.3256°N 3.3350°W		1868	Built for Sir Edward Bates, Liverpool merchant and ship-owner.	II
Greek Orthodox Church ‡	Toxteth, Liverpool; 53.3954°N 2.9671°W		1870	The church is in Neo-Byzantine style with four domes and round-arched windows. The competition for its design was won by W. and J. Hay, but the construction was supervised by Sumners.	II
Midland Railway goods warehouse ‡	Whitechapel and Crosshall Street, Liverpool; 53.4077°N 2.9848°W		1872–74	Built as a goods warehouse for the Midland Railway, with an addition in Peter Street in 1878. It was converted into a conservation centre for National Museums Liverpool in about 1995.	II
Town Hall ‡	St Helens, Merseyside; 53.4542°N 2.7353°W		1873–76	Built in brick with much in the way of stone dressings, it is in Gothic style. The original asymmetrically placed spire burnt down in 1913 and has been replaced by a tower.	—
Wesleyan Chapel ¶	Broughton-in-Furness, Cumbria; 54.2772°N 3.2112°W		1875	Complex of chapel, hall and kitchen in Gothic style, with a double bellcote.	—
South Block, Cowley High School ‡	St Helens, Merseyside; 53.4591°N 2.7461°W		1875–82	Built as an extension to the school, unoccupied by 1992, severely damaged by fire 1993.	II
St Cyprian's Church ‡	Edge Hill, Liverpool; 53.4080°N 2.9480°W		1879–81	Designed by Sumners, with many unusual features, including elements of Romanesque and Arts and Crafts styles.	II
St Luke's Art Workshops ‡	Myrtle Street, Liverpool; 53.4013°N 2.9686°W		1880	Built for Norbury, Upton and Paterson, architectural carvers.	—
