= Listed buildings in Formby =

Formby is a civil parish in Sefton, Merseyside, England. It contains 27 buildings that are recorded in the National Heritage List for England as designated listed buildings. Of these, two are listed at Grade II*, the middle of the three grades, and the others are at Grade II, the lowest grade. Most of the parish is occupied by the town of Formby, and the majority of the listed buildings are cottages or houses and associated structures, the oldest cottages dating back to the 16th century with a timber-framed core. The other listed buildings include churches and associated structures, a former convent, a schoolhouse converted into a restaurant, a set of stocks, and a cross on a roundabout.

== Key ==
Grade	Criteria
II*	Particularly important buildings of more than special interest
II	Buildings of national importance and special interest

== Buildings ==
Name and location	Photograph	Date	Notes	Grade
Dean's Cottage; 53.55070°N 3.06660°W	—	16th century (probable)	A timber-framed cottage encased in brick with a thatched roof. It is in one storey with an attic, and has a front of four bays, the east bay having been added later. There is a porch with a hipped thatched roof, and some of the windows are horizontally-sliding sashes. Inside the cottage are exposed crucks.	II
62 Gore's Lane; 53.56319°N 3.06375°W	—	16th to 17th century (probable)	Originally two houses, later one, it is timber-framed with a roughcast exterior. The house has a three-bay front, the left bay being recessed and lower with a slate roof, and the other bays are thatched. The windows are horizontally-sliding sashes. At the rear is a three-bay wing. Inside there are three cruck trusses.	II
White Cottage, Gore's Lane; 53.56291°N 3.06385°W	—	16th to 17th century (probable)	A timber-framed cottage encased in brick with a thatched roof. It is in a single storey with an attic. The cottage has a front of three bays, with a single bay extension to the left and an outshut at the rear. The windows are horizontally-sliding sashes, one being in an eyebrow dormer. Inside the cottage are two cruck trusses.	II
Formby Hall; 53.58127°N 3.04147°W	—	c. 1620	A former country house that was extended in the 18th century, and saved from dereliction in the 1980s. It is built in stuccoed brick with stone dressings. The main block is in five bays, the centre three bays having three storeys, and the outer bays two storeys. In the centre is a canted bay window, and the other windows are mullioned. There is a single-bay wing at the northwest, and a square tower at the northwest. All the parapets are embattled.	II*
Tower House and Tower Grange; 53.56503°N 3.07014°W	—	17th century (probable)	A pair of joined brick houses. They were remodelled in 1904 by C. A. Atkinson reusing materials from elsewhere, and enlarged by him in 1908. They have an irregular plan, and are mainly in two storeys. The roofs are partly thatched and partly tiled. Tower House has a front of five bays, and Tower Grange of six. The windows are of varied types including oriel windows. Other features include gables, brick diapering and applied timber-framing.	II
White Cottage, Massam's Lane; 53.56870°N 3.06680°W		17th century	A roughcast cottage in a single storey with an attic and a thatched roof. It is in two bays, the left bay being higher than the right. The entrance is in the right bay, and the windows are horizontally-sliding sashes.	II
Convent of Our Lady; 53.55742°N 3.05872°W	—	1688	Built as a Roman Catholic chapel but used as a barn until 1796, as a chapel until 1864, as cottages until 1930, then as a convent. It is roughcast with slate roofs. The building is in two storeys and has a three-bay front, the first bay being gabled and protruding to the front and the rear. The windows in the ground floor are sashes, and those above are casements. On the left side is a plaque with the Blundell arms and the date, and on the right side is a gabled porch.	II
May Cottage; 53.56516°N 3.05879°W	—	1690	The cottage is timber-framed with a roughcast exterior and a slate roof. It is in a single storey with an attic, and has a three-bay front with a cross-wing added in the 20th century. There is one horizontally-sliding sash window, the other windows being casements. Inside are two truncated cruck trusses, and an inglenook.	II
Formby House Farmhouse; 53.58590°N 3.04103°W	—	Early 18th century	The farmhouse is roughcast with a slate roof, it is two storeys, and has a three-bay front. On the front are two gabled half-dormers and a 20th-century porch. There are horizontally-sliding sash windows at the rear; the rest of the windows are casements.	II
Dovecote, Formby Hall; 53.58192°N 3.04182°W	—	Early 18th century	The dovecote is square, built in brick, with a pyramidal flagged roof surmounted by an open lantern. The entrance is on the east side. On the south side is a blocked entrance and a bull's eye opening. Inside are brick pigeon holes. The adjoining wall is included in the listing.	II*
Corner Cottage and Linton Cottage; 53.56627°N 3.06633°W	—	Early 18th century	Two brick cottages. Corner Cottage has a thatched roof, is in a single storey with an attic, it has a three-bay front, and an entrance with a lean-to canopy. Linton Cottage has a slate roof, is in two storeys, and has a two bay front. The windows are horizontally-sliding sashes.	II
Kew Farmhouse; 53.54615°N 3.07307°W	—	1733	The farmhouse is roughcast with some brick at the rear and has a stone-slate roof. It is in two storeys and has a two-bay front. The windows are a mix of casements and horizontally-sliding sashes. On the left side is a stone inscribed with initials and the date. On the right side is an outshut under a lean-to roof.	II
St Peter's Church; 53.56635°N 3.05951°W		1746	The oldest part of the church is the nave and tower, which are in brick on a stone plinth with stone dressings. The chancel, north vestry and south chapel are in stone and date from 1873. The roofs are slated. A south porch was added in 1884. The nave has round-headed windows with Doric surrounds. The tower is narrow, with a stone belfry in the form of a cupola. The later parts are in Gothic Revival style. Inside the church is a west gallery.	II
2 Church Road; 53.55515°N 3.05562°W	—	18th century	A roughcast house with a slate roof, it has a three-bay front; the first bay is in a single storey, and the other bays have two storeys. The windows are a mix of horizontally-sliding sashes, and casements. The first bay projects to the rear.	II
21 Green Lane; 53.56589°N 3.05952°W	—	18th century	A roughcast house with a thatched roof, it is in two storeys and has a two-bay front. The windows are horizontally-sliding sashes, and there is a central entrance. On the right side is a gabled porch.	II
1 Southport Road; 53.56643°N 3.05503°W	—	18th century	A house in whitewashed brick with a slate roof, it is in two storeys and has a four-bay front. The first bay is recessed, and the right two bays are higher. The windows are a mix of horizontally-sliding sashes and casements, and the entrance is in the third bay.	II
Old Spanker's Cottage; 53.55071°N 3.05585°W	—	18th century (probable)	A brick house with a thatched roof, in a single storey with an attic. It has a two-bay front with a single-bay lean-to extension on the left. The windows are horizontally-sliding sashes, those in the upper floor in gabled dormers. There is a central gabled porch, and a low wing to the rear.	II
Sundial; 53.56617°N 3.05960°W	—	18th century (probable)	The sundial is in the churchyard of St Peter's Church. It is in stone, and has a Tuscan column and a metal plate, the gnomon being missing.	II
Village stocks 53.55187°N 3.08733°W	—	18th century	The stocks are located to the south of the porch of St Luke's Church. They consist of stone piers with slots for wooden boards. Above these is an iron bar.	II
Old Parsonage; 53.56901°N 3.06090°W	—	1772	A brick house with stone dressings and slate roofs. The main part is in two storeys with a three-bay front. To the left is a later single-storey one-bay extension, and to the right is a two-storey gabled cross-wing. The windows in the cross-wing are casements, and elsewhere they are sashes with wedge lintels. There is a central entrance with a lean-to porch.	II
Othello Restaurant; 53.55763°N 3.05916°W	—	1785	Originating as a school house, later used as a restaurant, it is built in brick with a stone-slate roof. The building is in a single storey and has a three-bay front, the first bay projecting forward and gabled. There is a porch between the second and third bays. The windows are casements under segmental heads. There is an extension at the rear.	II
Garswood; 53.56167°N 3.07187°W	—	1830s	A stuccoed house with a slate roof, in two storeys with a four-bay front. On the right is a conservatory, and at the rear is a stable wing. The end bays project forward and contain canted bay windows with casements. The other windows are sashes. Above the bay windows are friezes, cornices and cartouches, and between them is a cast iron verandah with a balustrade.	II
St Luke's Church; 53.55210°N 3.08726°W		1852–55	The church stands on the site of an ancient chapel. It was designed by William Culshaw, and is built in stone with a slate roof. The church consists of a nave, transepts, a chancel, and a south porch. On the west gable is a bellcote. The windows contain Geometrical tracery.	II
Cross on roundabout 53.55435°N 3.05769°W	—	c. 1879	The cross was placed here when the previous cross was moved to St Luke's churchyard. It is in stone, and consists of an octagonal base on three square steps with a chamfered stem and a moulded cap.	II
Sandhills Cottages; 53.54594°N 3.08828°W	—	1882	A pair of holiday cottages designed by A. H. Mackmurdo. They are roughcast with tiled roofs and have half-hipped gables. The cottages are in two storeys, and each has a three-bay front. Along the front is a verandah, and each house has a central French window with a canted oriel window above. The other windows are casements. At the rear is a central two-bay wing. The flanking wings are weatherboarded, and the end bays have a tile-hung upper floor.	II
Cross, St Luke's Churchyard; 53.55182°N 3.08712°W		Unknown	The cross was moved from Cross Green, and installed in its present site in 1879. It consists of three square stone steps with a socket for a wooden cross.	II
Godstone; 53.55158°N 3.08756°W	—	Unknown	The stone lies to the south of St Luke's Church. It has an irregular shape, with one flat face. This face is carved with a cross on a stepped base and surmounted by a circle. The stone is traditionally associated with funerals.	II
