= Church of St James, Liverpool =

Coordinates: 53.3943°N 2.9748°W

St James' Church
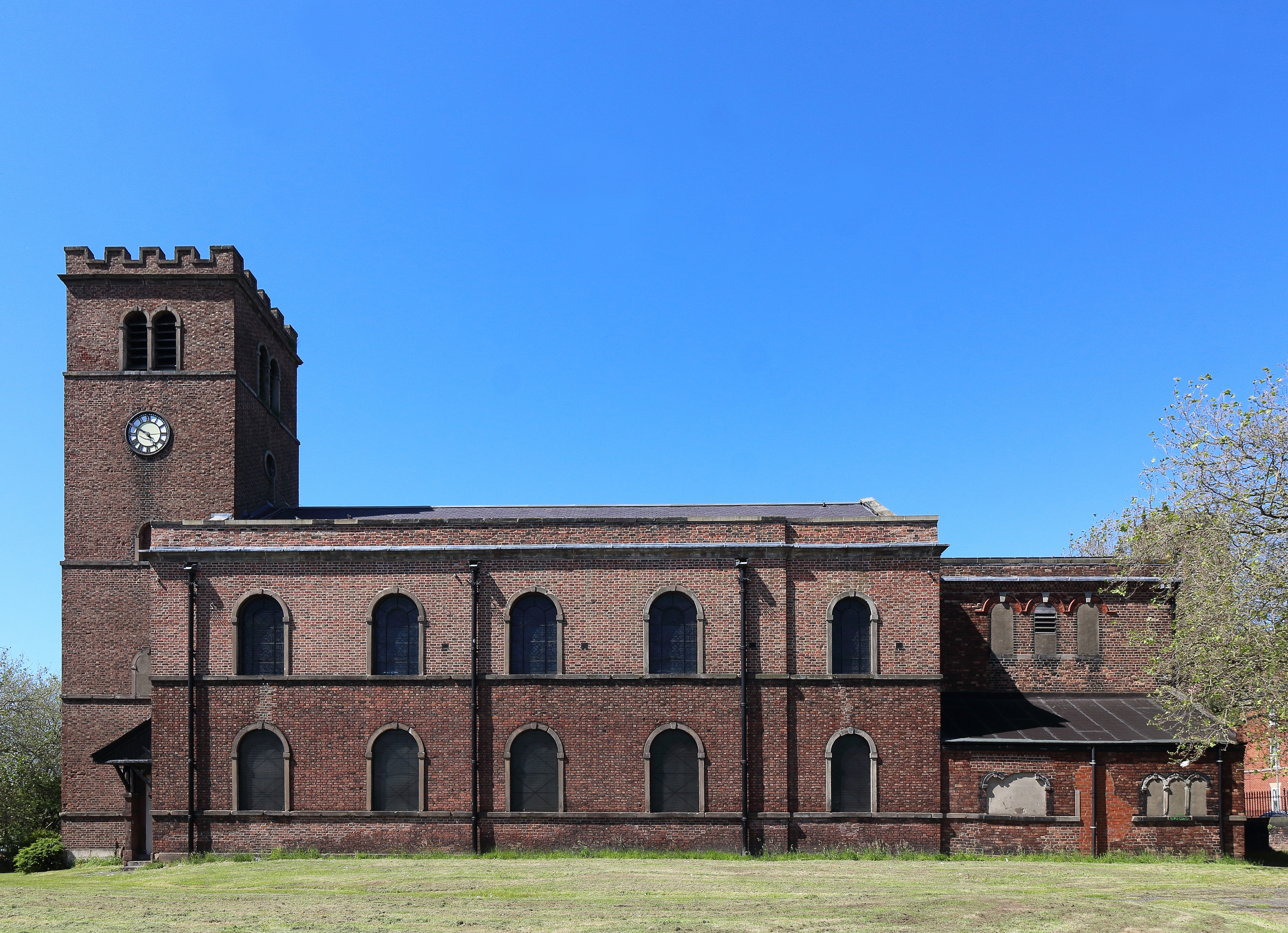
- St James' Church from the southeast

- Location in Merseyside
- OS grid reference: SJ 353 891
- Location: St James Place, Toxteth, Liverpool
- Country: England
- Denomination: Anglican
- Website: St James in the City

Architecture
- Functional status: Active
- Heritage designation: Grade II*
- Designated: 19 June 1985
- Architect(s): Cuthbert Bisbrown; William Culshaw; H. Havelock Sutton
- Architectural type: Church
- Style: Georgian
- Groundbreaking: 1774
- Completed: 1775

Specifications
- Materials: Brick with stone dressings

Administration
- Province: York
- Diocese: Liverpool

Clergy
- Vicar: Revd Jude Padfield

St James' Church is an Anglican church in St James Place, Toxteth, Liverpool, England. It is recorded in the National Heritage List for England as a designated Grade II* listed building. Having been declared redundant in 1974, it returned to active use in 2010 as St James in the City.

== History ==
The church was built in 1774–75 by Cuthbert Bisbrown, who probably also designed it. Originally a chapel of ease for the parish of Walton, the church acquired its own parish in 1844. Its congregation, which reflected the area's diverse population of affluent merchants and industrial labourers, included black settlers from West Africa, the Caribbean and America. A new timber roof was added in 1846 by William Culshaw. The chancel, designed by H. Havelock Sutton, was built in 1900. On 1 October 1974 the church was declared redundant, and on 9 June 1976 was vested in the Churches Conservation Trust.

In 2009, the church was returned to the Liverpool Diocese, and was re-opened in 2010 as the Church of St James in the City. As the building was in a semi-derelict condition, a marquee was erected inside the church to allow the immediate resumption of worship while repair work was ongoing. An urgent roof replacement was carried out between 2011–2012, along with other structural repairs, but the parochial council was unable to secure funding for further work. The marquee was incrementally expanded to meet the needs of the growing congregation, but the building remained unsuitable for full use, due to minor safety issues and a lack of running water. In 2018, however, a kitchen, toilets and an office were installed, and by 2021 the renovation project was complete, with the addition of several new rooms and a mezzanine floor.

== Architecture ==
=== Exterior ===
St James is constructed in red brick with stone dressings. Its plan consists of a five-bay nave, a chancel, and a west tower. Along the sides of the nave are two tiers of round-headed windows. The tower is in four stages with an embattled parapet. Its third stage contains clock faces, and in the top stage are paired louvred bell openings.

=== Graveyard ===
There used to be graves and vaults in the churchyard. John Lightbody noted his family vault in 1863 as shown in the photograph.

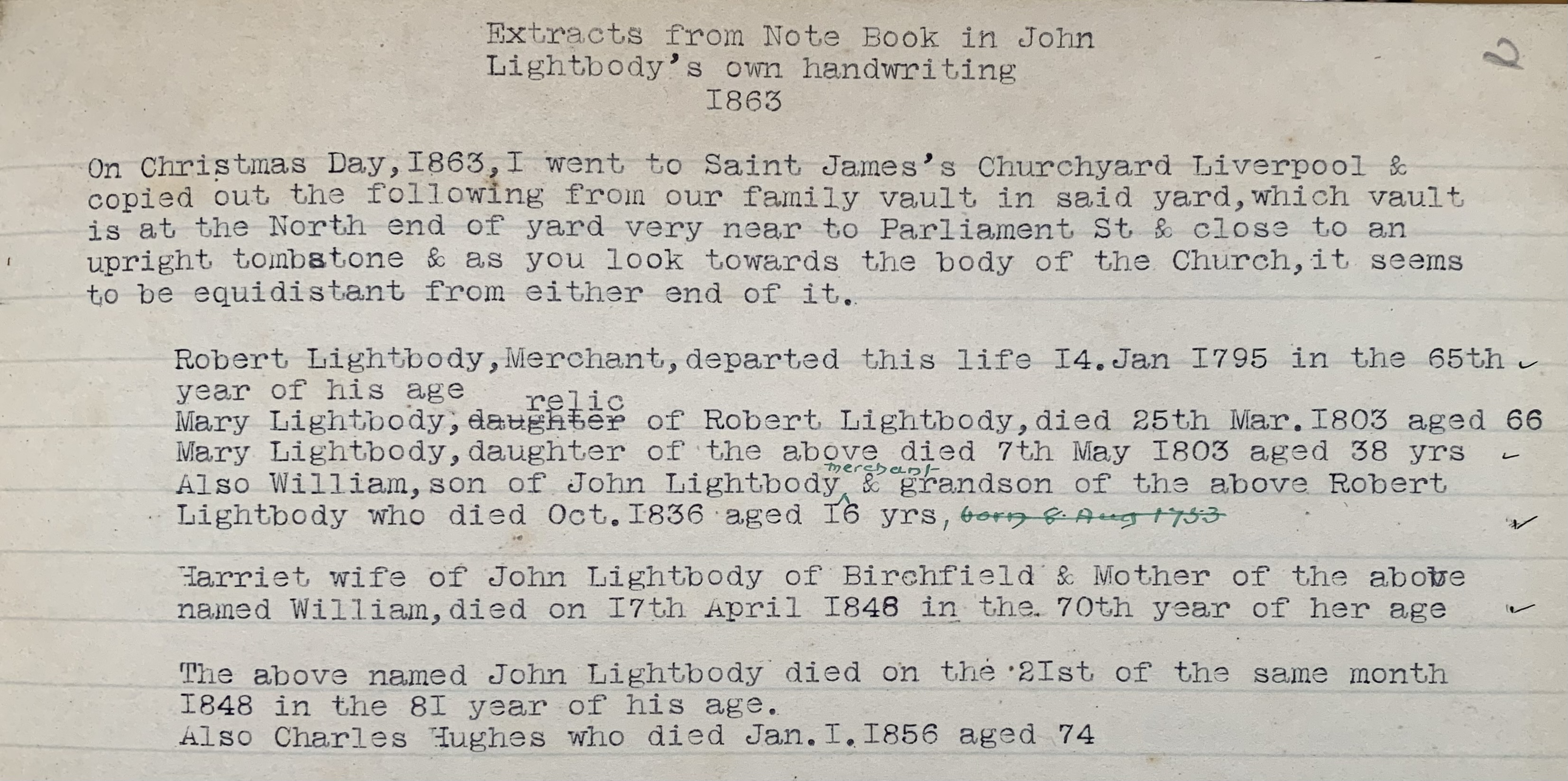

=== Interior ===
The architectural style of the interior is "conventionally Georgian". There are galleries on three sides, carried on slim quatrefoil cast iron columns. The columns are the earliest existing examples in Liverpool of cast iron columns, and are one of the earliest examples of them in England. The timber roof is open, with Norman-style arches. The east window is stained glass designed by Henry Holiday, dated 1881. There are monuments dating from the late-18th and the early-19th centuries. Many of the monuments relate to the slave trade.

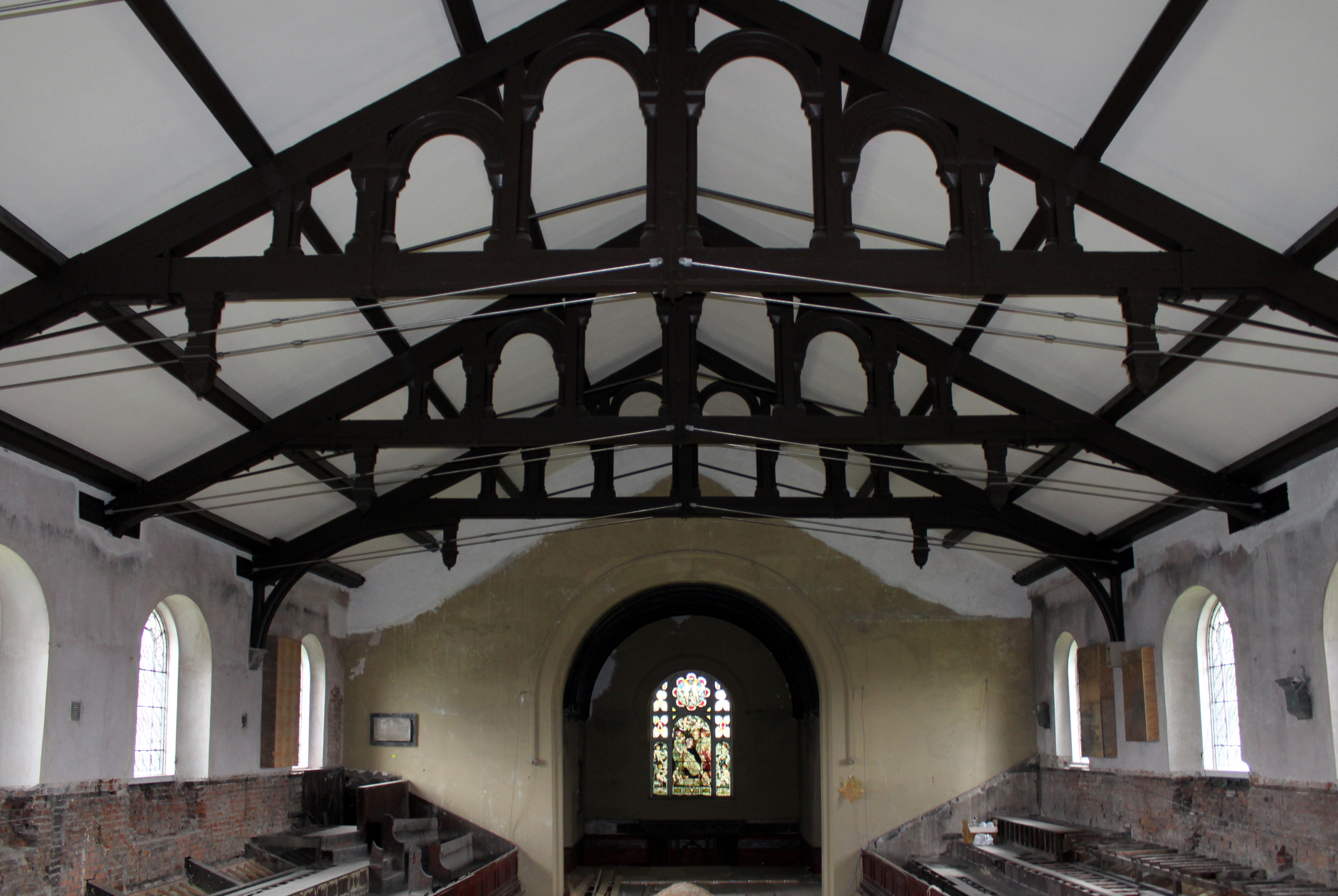
Restored roof, 2017

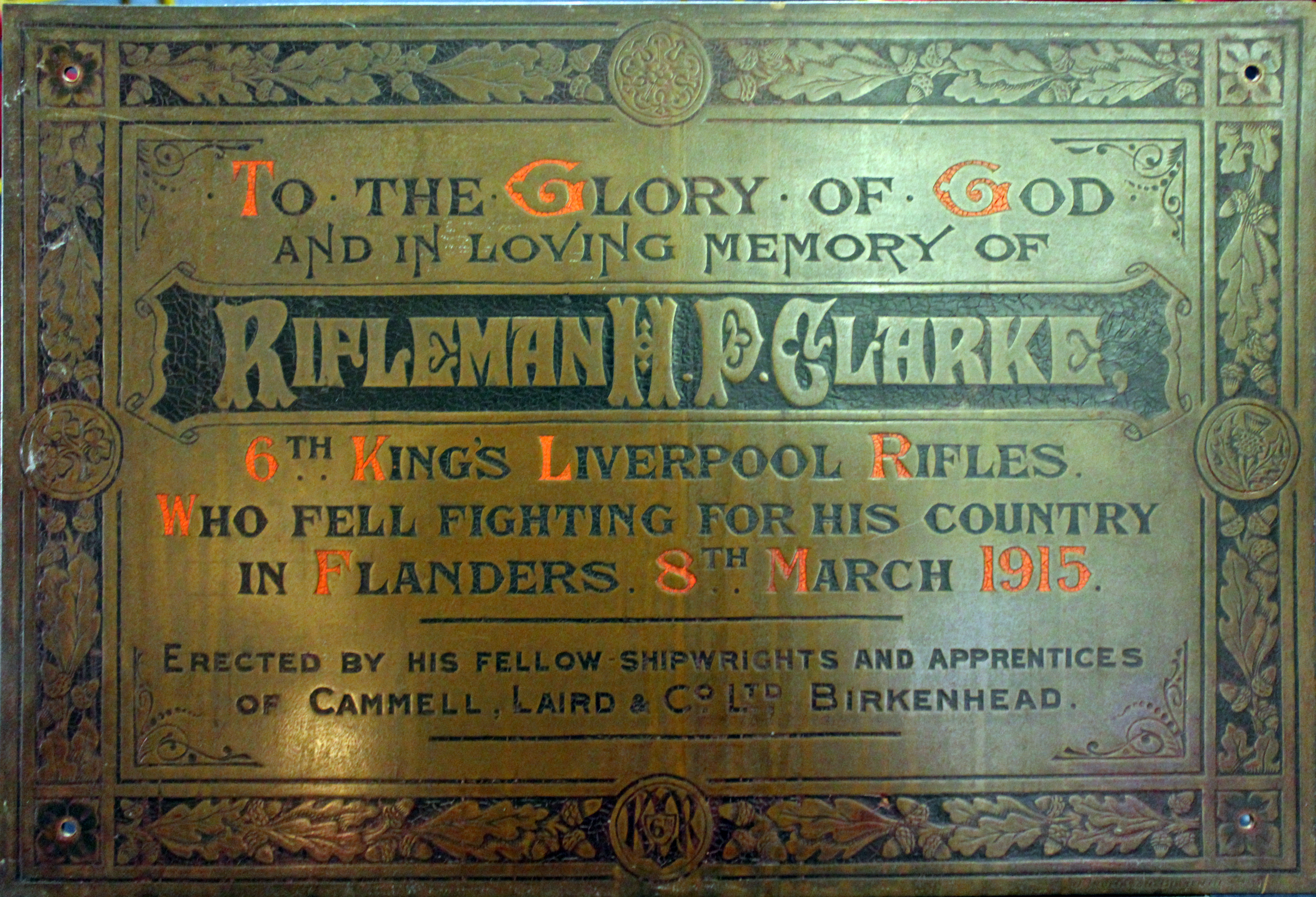
Memorial plaque to Henry Percy Clarke of the King's Liverpool Regiment, killed in World War I

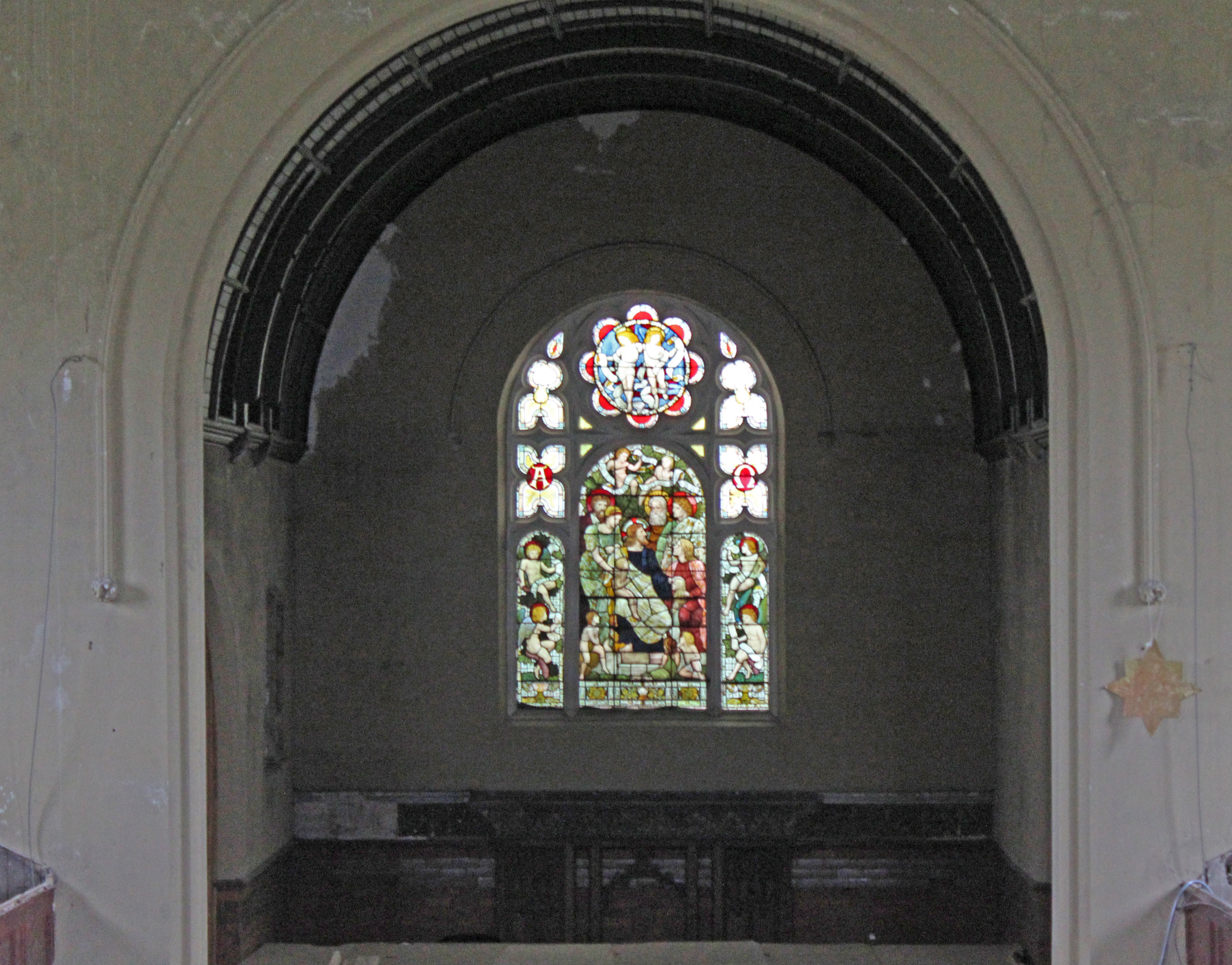
Towards the east window

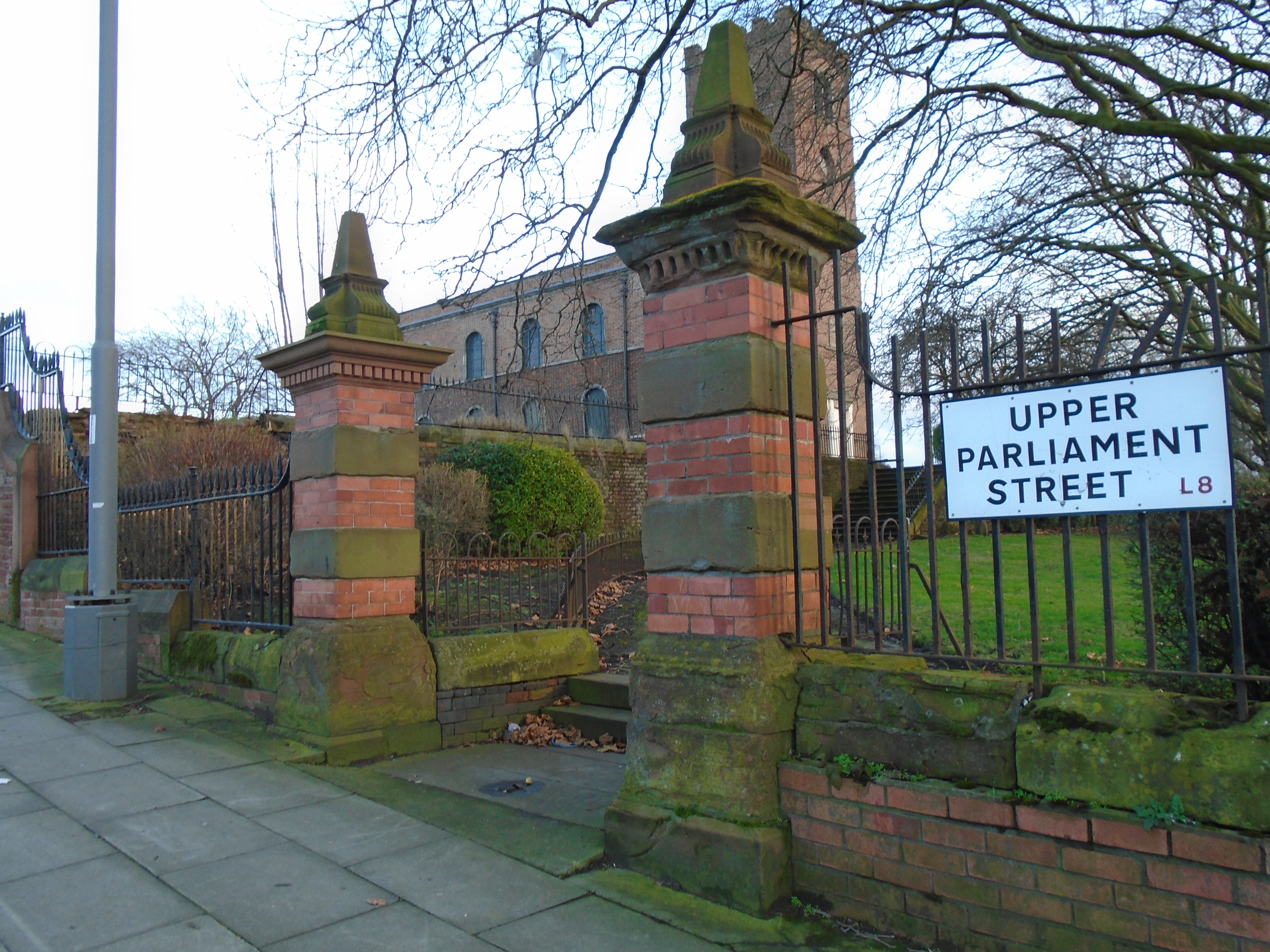
Grade II listed walls, gates and railings

== See also ==
- Grade II* listed buildings in Merseyside
- List of extant works by Culshaw and Sumners
