= Range High School =

Coordinates: 53.544°N 3.081°W

Location
- Stapleton Road; Formby; Liverpool, Merseyside, L37 2YN; England

Information
- Type: Academy
- Established: 1976
- Local authority: Sefton
- Department for Education URN: 137612 Tables
- Ofsted: Reports
- Head teacher: Michael McGarry
- Gender: Coeducational
- Age: 11 to 18
- Enrolment: 1072
- Houses: Sefton, Blundell, Derby and Weld
- Website: http://www.range.sefton.sch.uk/

Range High School is a coeducational secondary school and sixth form located in Formby, Merseyside, England. It was built during the early 1970s after a contracted period of delays and was necessary due to the increasing overcrowding at nearby Formby High School.

The local primary schools St. Luke's and Woodlands act as feeder schools to Range High.

The school is one of the few schools in the country to have received five consecutive 'outstanding' ratings from OFSTED; however, it dropped to a "requires improvement" rating in 2018.

In 2016, the school was one of only three schools in the area to achieve a positive Progress 8 score on the new national school performance measures, while the 2019 was the highest of any 11-18 secondary school in Sefton.

== History ==
=== Planning ===
Overcrowding at Formby High School reached unprecedented levels by the early 1970s, with ten-form entries at the school by 1971, each with over 30 pupils per class. Plans were already underway for construction of a new secondary school, then referred to as Formby South High School. Delays were experienced before construction of the school could commence, due to disagreements with landowners over the value of the land needed to build the school on, then privately owned by the estate of Mr Richard Formby. There were also concerns over dangerous emissions from the proposed heating system.

=== Construction ===
Despite budget cutbacks announced by the Chancellor of the Exchequer in January 1974 just prior to the February 1974 United Kingdom general election, the school project was unaffected as it was considered a "basic new project" as opposed to a "replacement project" and therefore received priority due to its urgent need. Further delays were reported the following month in February 1974, due to a delay in the tendering process by Lancashire County Council. Building work started on the school in April 1974 at a cost of around £950,000, following several set backs and at that time was estimated for completion by May 1976. Although some of the early delays were as a result of difficulty in obtaining the land, construction delays were attributed to building material shortages. The construction cost was a considerable increase on the 1973 estimate of £670,000, although assurances were offered that the cost burden would not fall exclusively to Formby residents.

Local councilors and parents had been pressing for an additional school for many years, often ending up at the centre of controversy. Upon completion, it was expected that the new school would accommodate 750 pupils, with the potential to increase it up to 1,050 pupils. The school was built on a 20 acres (8.1 ha) site and was split across two separate single storey buildings, one for teaching classrooms and the other for sports and arts.

=== 21st century ===
Range High School received specialist school status in mathematics and computing in 2005 following large fundraising activities involving parents, local businesses and The Ogden Trust. Upon its gaining specialist status, a government grant was provided to the school, allowing investment in new technology and building work, making what was formerly a geography department into an IT suite, and adding interactive whiteboards in many classrooms.

Previously a community school administered by Sefton Metropolitan Borough Council, in November 2011 Range High School converted to academy status.

In December 2018, the school received "requires improvement" during their November 2018 Ofsted inspection, having previously achieved five consecutive "outstanding" judgements. As well as criticism of school leaders, the report also repeatedly highlighted the poor behaviour of a minority group of boys, while noting that girls made "very strong progress" overall by a magnitude of half a grade better than boys. Headteacher Graham Aldridge subsequently resigned from his post in early 2019. The school received an Ofsted rating of "good" in 2022.

During January 2022, the school took the decision to remove the boys' toilet doors to deter "anti-social behaviour" which was quoted to leave boys feeling uncomfortable. Deputy headteacher Tom Dolly said that they decided to remove the doors due to anti-social behaviour and denied boys' privacy was affected by their choice. Some boys also stated their fears of sexism as the girls' toilets still had doors.

==== Stabbing plot ====
On 22 July 2024, 17-year-old former pupil Axel Rudakubana used a pseudonym to book a taxi to take him to the school, minutes before the school broke-up for the summer holidays. However, he was stopped by his father as he entered the taxi and returned to their house. A week later, Rudakubana stabbed 13 people, 3 fatally, at a children's dance workshop in Southport. Prosecutors asserted Rudakubana plotted an attack at the school and was unsuccessful due to his father's intervention.

It was additionally found that Rudakubana, after being excluded from the school in October 2019, aged 13, returned to the school in December with a hockey stick on which he had written the names of pupils. He struck one pupil with the hockey stick, breaking their wrist before being restrained by teachers. When the police arrived, a knife was found in his backpack.

== Notable alumni ==
- Anne Hollinghurst, Bishop of Aston
- Stuart Kershaw, drummer, producer, Orchestral Manoeuvres in the Dark, Atomic Kitten
- Holly Aitchison, England Women's Rugby Union player
- Sarah Beckett, England Women's Rugby Union player
- Chris Chibnall, television writer

== Notable staff ==
- Gill Burns (PE teacher and head of Derby House) England rugby player who won the 1994 Women's Rugby World Cup
- Gerry Helme, long-distance runner
