= Formby Hall =

Listed building in Merseyside, England

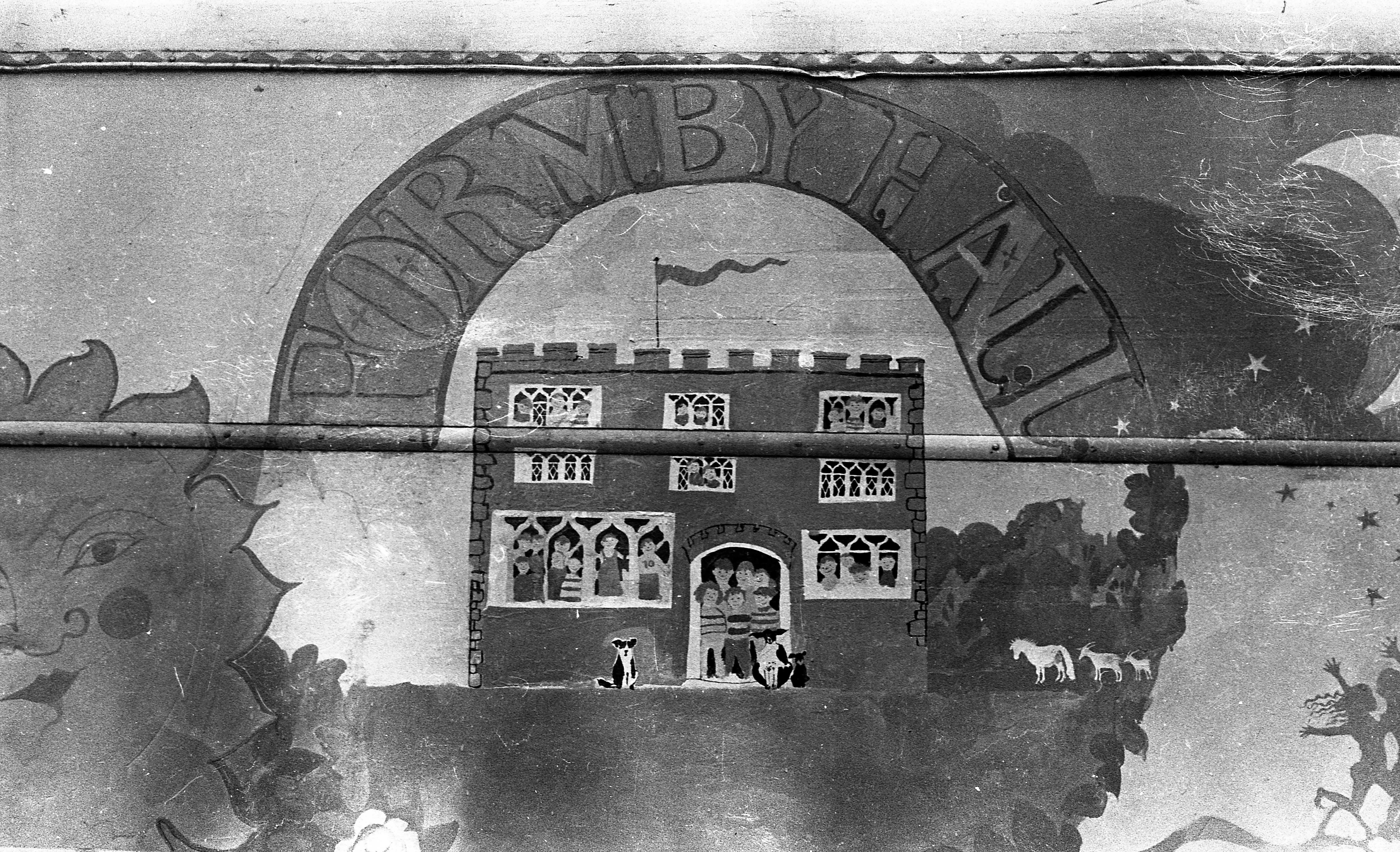
- Formby Hall logo, 1977

General information
- Location: Formby, Merseyside, England
- Coordinates: 53.580°N 3.042°W
- Year(s) built: 1523
- Renovated: Mid-18th century (extended); 1896 (modernised)
- Designations

Listed Building – Grade II*
- Official name: Formby Hall
- Designated: 19 July 1966
- Reference no.: 1343286

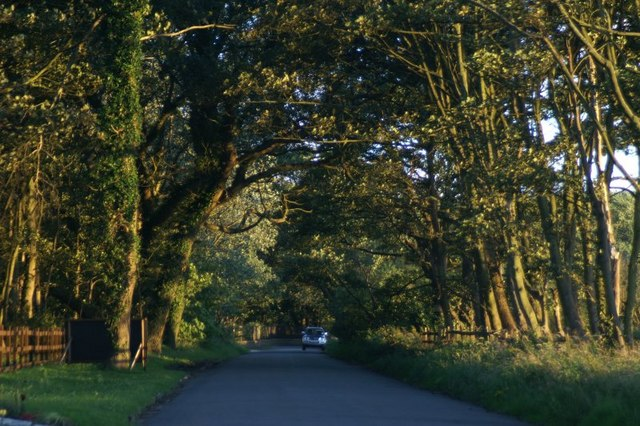
Woodland at Formby Hall

Formby Hall is located to the north-east of Formby in the English metropolitan county of Merseyside, in secluded woodland adjoining the Formby Hall Golf and Country Club. The present house, built for William Formby, dates back to 1523 (Note: The Historic England list entry references a date of c. 1620.) but it is believed that the Formby family has occupied the site since the 12th century.

== Early years ==
Over the years the hall has seen many owners and occupants. The Formby family lived at Formby Hall in a direct father-to-son line from the year 1110, with just a single break, when a cousin entered the line of succession. Many modifications and additions have been made to the original building. For example, the battlements were added in the mid-18th century by John Formby who took inspiration from the Gothic-style architecture of Horace Walpole's home at Twickenham. In 1896 the hall was modernised by Colonel John Formby who added the West Wing drawing room.

== 20th century ==
During World War II, the hall was continuously occupied by army personnel, with up to 150 soldiers accommodated in the spacious rooms. In the summer of 1949, the hall was broken into in the early hours through a ground floor window, with thieves taking keys from a bedroom and ransacking drawers in an office. The owner, John Frederic Lonsdale, quoted that "I wish I weren't such a sound sleeper", believing that the burglar must have been someone very familiar with the house and its layout. Among some of the valuables taken were silver ashtrays, cameras and cash.

The hall was inherited by successive generations of sons of the Lord of the Manor. This chain ended in 1958 upon the death of Colonel John Frederic Lonsdale Formby whose sons had both died during the Second World War. The estate was inherited by an Australian nephew but then fell into disrepair. The hall was Grade II* listed in 1966. In the 1970s, John Moores Junior leased the hall and the lands and used it as a home to house children from the crowded areas of inner city Liverpool.

== Dereliction and refurbishment ==
By the 1980s, the hall was once again disused and fell into dereliction. After this, Richard Irving acquired the whole Formby estate. At that time it was a run down collection of derelict buildings and overgrown land. After two years he sold the hall to another local businessman, who bought it as 'site as seen' without even conducting a survey and has since restored the hall to its former glory.

The remaining land was sold to other local businessmen who developed a golf course.

== See also ==
- Listed buildings in Formby
- Grade II* listed buildings in Merseyside
