= Formby High School =

Location
- Freshfield Road; Formby, Liverpool, Merseyside, L37 3HW; England; 53.560687°N 3.068644°W

Information
- Type: Academy
- Motto: "Determined To Achieve"
- Established: 1938
- Specialist: Arts college
- Department for Education URN: 137436 Tables
- Ofsted: Reports
- Headteacher: Alex Wood
- Gender: Coeducational
- Age: 11 to 18
- Enrolment: 1,016
- Colour
- Website: formbyhighschool.com

Formby High School is an English secondary school with academy status located in the town of Formby, Merseyside. The local primary schools Freshfield, Redgate and Trinity St. Peter's act as feeder schools to Formby High.

== History and administration ==
The school was officially opened in November 1938 and later reopened in 1972 by Margaret Thatcher during her tenure as Secretary of State for Education and Science. However, the school faced challenges with overcrowding in the 1970s, with ten-form entries by 1971, each with over 30 pupils per class, prompting considerations for conditional admissions in 1972. To address the issue, the Sefton Education Authority provided temporary classrooms in 1974, accommodating 200 students. By that time, enrollment had reached 1,560 pupils, which expected to rise to 1,750 by September 1974. Construction was scheduled to commence on a new sixth form block around this time to alleviate capacity constraints. Additionally, building work started on a new high school in April 1974, initially known as Formby South High School, with an anticipated capacity of 750 pupils and the potential to accommodate up to 1,050 pupils.

In 2002, the school achieved specialist school status as an Arts College, allowing it to access additional funding in this subject area. Two years later, in 2004, its newsixth form building was opened by local MP Claire Curtis-Thomas.

Under the leadership of Alex Wood, the school currently accommodates over 1,000 students.

== Notable former pupils ==
- Angela Eagle, Labour MP and former minister
- Maria Eagle, Labour MP and former minister
- Andrew Cooper (Labour politician), Labour MP
- Karl Neilson, television director
- Stacey Roca, actress
- Robbie Foy, footballer
