= National Conservation Centre =

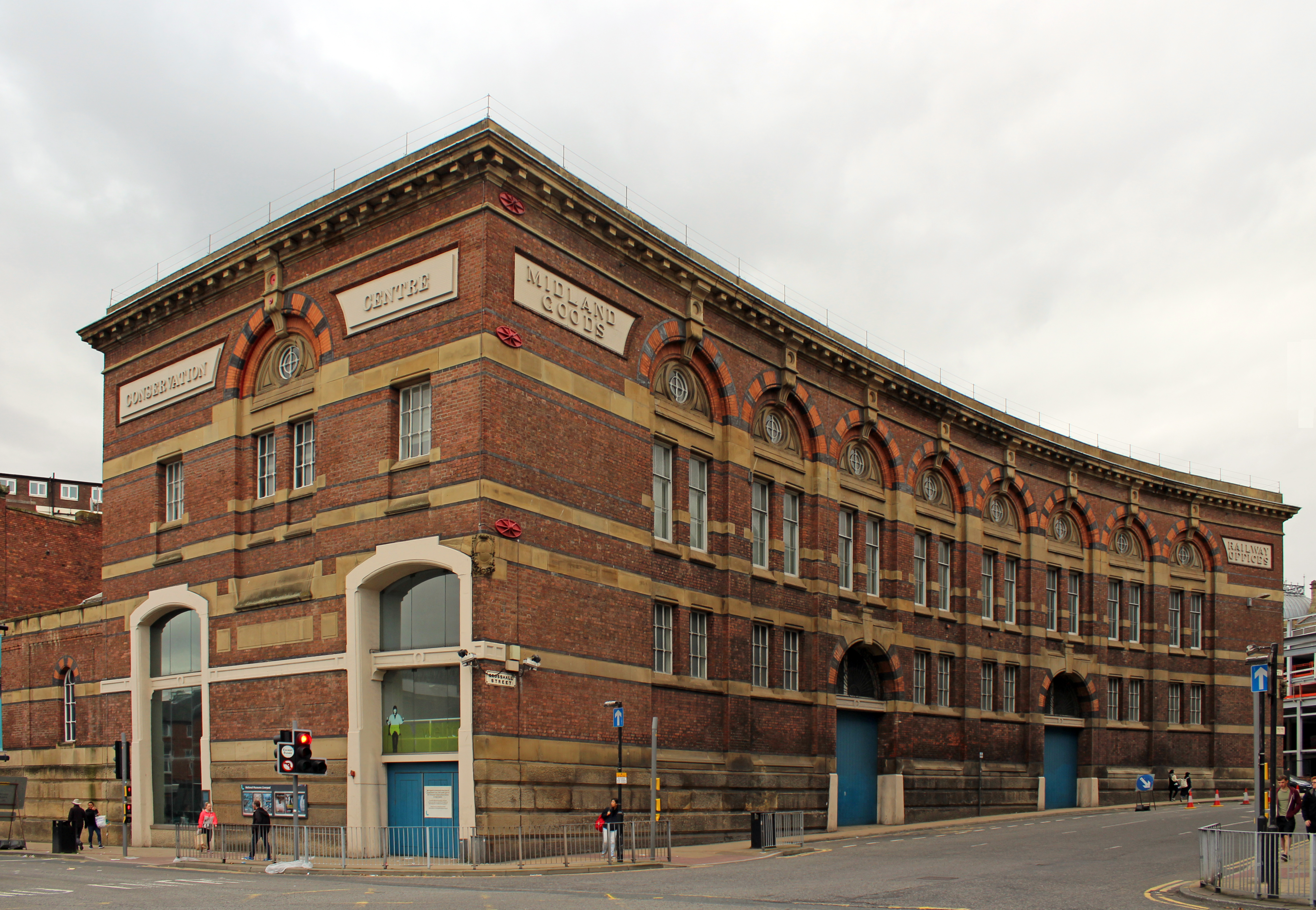
- National Conservation Centre, formerly the Midland Railway Goods Warehouse

- Location in Liverpool
- 53.4077°N 2.9848°W
- Location: Liverpool, Merseyside, England
- OS grid reference: SJ 346 905

History
- Built: 1872
- Built for: Midland Railway

Site notes
- Architect: Henry Sumners
- Restored: 1995–96
- Restored by: Ken Martin
- Governing body: National Museums Liverpool

Listed Building – Grade II
- Designated: 14 March 1975
- Reference no.: 1062567

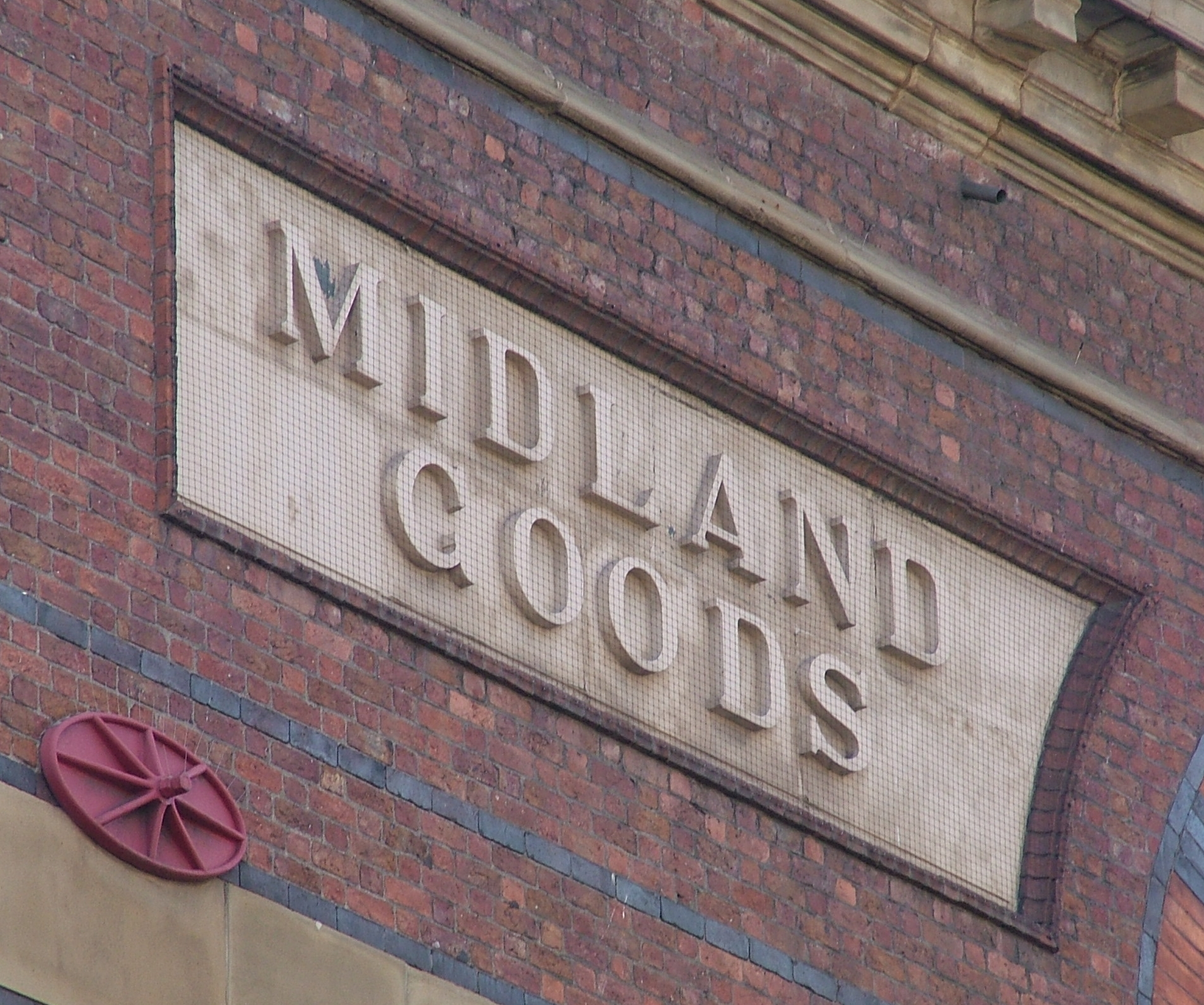

The National Conservation Centre, formerly the Midland Railway Goods Warehouse, is located in Liverpool, Merseyside, England. It stands in a block surrounded by Victoria Street, Crosshall Street, Whitechapel, and Peter Street. After it closed as a warehouse it was converted into a conservation centre for National Museums Liverpool in the 1990s. Initially its exhibition area was open to the public, but this closed in 2010. The centre is recorded in the National Heritage List for England as a designated Grade II listed building.

== History ==
The warehouse was built as a depot for the storage of railway freight in 1872 for the Midland Railway. It was designed by the local architect Henry Sumners of Culshaw and Sumners. The building was extended along Peter Street in 1878 in a similar architectural style. Between 1995 and 1996 it was converted by another local architect, Ken Martin, into the Conservation Centre for National Museums Liverpool. In addition to its conservation work, the centre had an exhibition area open to the public to demonstrate the techniques of conservation, which attracted 60,000 visitors a year. In September 2005 the centre closed for refurbishment, and re-opened in June 2006 as the National Conservation Centre. Because of government cuts in funding, the visitor centre closed in 2010, but conservation work continues in the building.

== Architecture ==
The centre is constructed in red brick on a rusticated stone plinth, with stone dressings and bands, and some decoration in blue brick. The exterior of the building is expressed as three or four storeys, and around the top of the building is a cornice with modillions. The hipped roof is in slate. On each of the four sides are arched openings large enough to admit freight. The front on Crosshall Street is concave; it is in eight bays, each bay consisting of a tall blind arch containing windows, two of which also have arched entrances. On the Victoria Street front are carved spandrels containing shields and the names of stations of the Midland Railway. In 1921 Charles Reilly, Professor of Architecture at the University of Liverpool, was of the opinion that at the time it was "one of the best buildings in the town". On 14 March 1975, it was designated as a Grade II listed building.

== See also ==
- Grade II listed buildings in Liverpool-L1
- List of extant works by Culshaw and Sumners
