= St Peter's Church, Formby =

Coordinates: 53.5664°N 3.0595°W

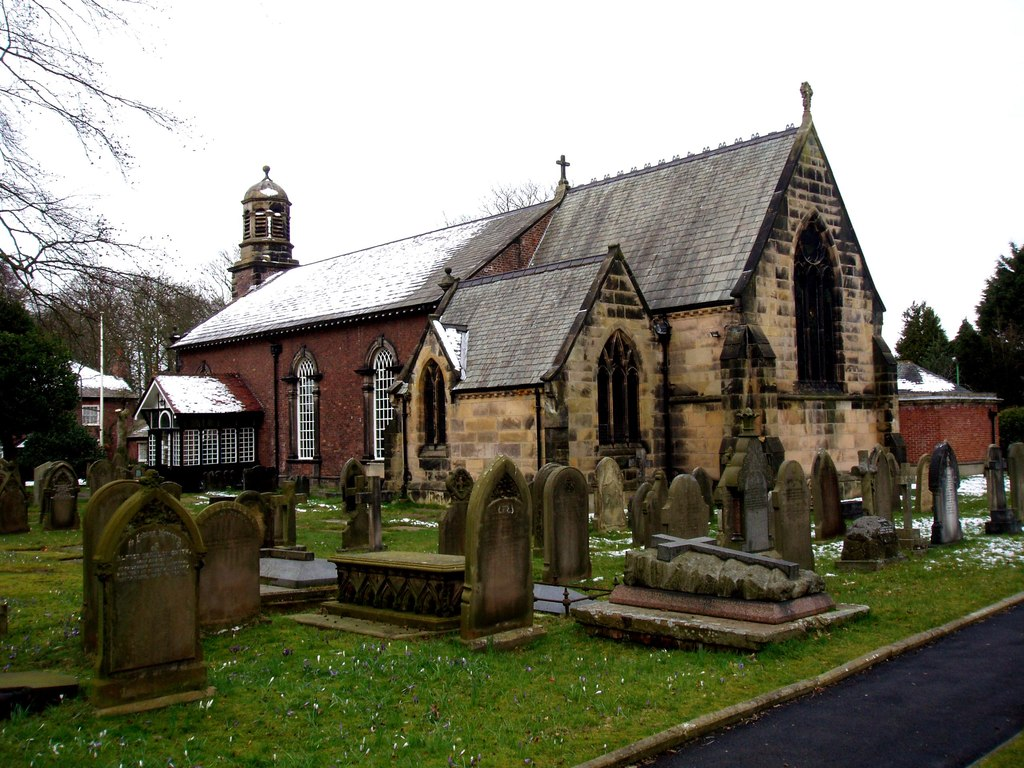
- St Peter's Church, Formby, from the southeast

- Location in Merseyside
- OS grid reference: SD 299 083
- Location: Green Lane, Formby, Sefton, Merseyside
- Country: England
- Denomination: Anglican
- Website: St Peter, Formby

History
- Status: Parish church
- Dedication: Saint Peter

Architecture
- Functional status: Active
- Heritage designation: Grade II
- Designated: 19 July 1966
- Architectural type: Church
- Style: Georgian and Gothic Revival
- Groundbreaking: 1746
- Completed: 1873

Specifications
- Materials: Partly brick with stone dressings and partly stone, slate roofs

Administration
- Province: York
- Diocese: Liverpool
- Archdeaconry: Liverpool
- Deanery: Sefton
- Parish: Formby

Clergy
- Vicar: Revd Anne Taylor

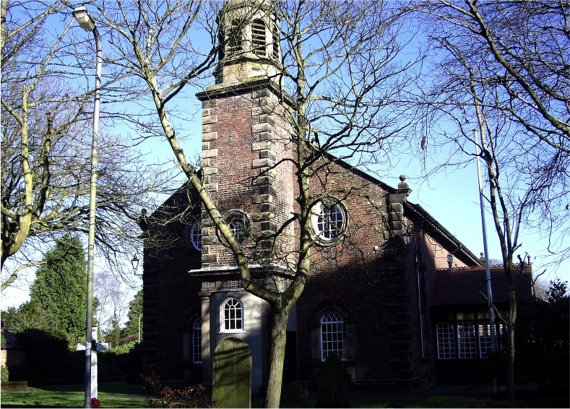
St Peter's from the west

St Peter's Church is in Green Lane, Formby, Sefton, Merseyside, England, and is an active Anglican parish church in the diocese of Liverpool. It was built in 1746 to replace a chapel on another site that had been destroyed in a storm. The church built at this time is in Georgian style. It was extended at the east end in 1873, and this part of the church is in Gothic Revival style. The church is recorded in the National Heritage List for England as a designated Grade II listed building.

== History ==
The church originated as 'The Ancient Chapelry of Formby, St Peter'. The chapel was part of the parish of St Mary, Walton. It stood near the sea at the western extremity of the town, but was destroyed by a storm in 1739. The chapel was replaced by the present church on a site nearer the centre of the town. This was opened in 1746; it contained box pews, and the pulpit was on the south side of the church, between the windows. In about 1830 the open porch on the west side of the tower was filled in with a staircase leading up to a new west gallery. The church was extended in 1873 when the apse at the east end was replaced by a chancel, a sanctuary, a vestry, and a chapel known as the Formby chapel. The porch was added in 1884 and the roof was replaced in 1900. In 1935 the north and south galleries were removed, and it is thought that the vestry was extended at the same time.

== Architecture ==
=== Exterior ===
St Peter's consists of a three-bay nave with a narrow west tower, which were built in 1746, and a chancel, north vestry, and south chapel, which were added in 1873. The parts built in 1746 are in brick with stone dressings on a stone base, and are in Georgian style; the parts built in 1873 are in stone, and are in Gothic Revival (Neo-Gothic) style. The roofs are slated. The base of the nave is decorated with roll moulding, at its top is a dentilled brick cornice, on the corners are rusticated quoins, and the gables are coped and topped by ball finials. The windows are round-headed and have apron panels, moulded sills, angle pilasters, and Doric entablatures with triglyph friezes, archivolts, and keystones. They contain intersecting tracery. The porch is timber-framed and glazed. At the base of the tower is a porch with angle pilasters, a Doric entablature, and an entrance on the south side. Its convex west wall contains a round-headed window. Above this is a round window, and there are quoins on the corners, At the top of the tower is an octagonal bell stage with round-headed louvred bell openings, surmounted by a cupola with a ball finial. At the west end of the nave are round-headed windows with round windows above. The chancel has angle buttresses, a three-light east window containing Geometrical tracery, and a cross on the gable. In the chapel are a three-light east window and a two-light south window. The extension to the vestry is in the style of the nave.

=== Interior ===
Inside the church, the roof has elaborate king post trusses. The west gallery is carried on slim Doric timber columns, and has an entablature with a dentilled cornice. In the church is a painted board referring to an enlargement in 1830, royal arms dated 1710, and a chest dated 1740. There is a two-bay arcade between the chancel and the chapel. The pulpit is in the style of the 17th century, and was moved from St Saviour's Church in Liverpool when it was demolished. The stained glass in the east window is by Shrigley and Hunt. The first pipe organ was built in 1885 by E. Franklin Lloyd of Liverpool. This was rebuilt and extended in 1949 by Rushworth and Dreaper as a war memorial, and altered in 1970 and again in 1982 by David Wells. This organ was replaced in 2002 by Principal Pipe Organs of York, using reconstituted pipes from the previous organ, together with new pipes. In the cupola is a set of eight tubular bells. Originally they were rung manually, but since 2010 they are driven electrically.

== Appraisal ==
The church was designated as a Grade II listed building on 19 July 1966. Grade II is the lowest of the three grades of listing and is applied to buildings that are "nationally important and of special interest". Pollard and Pevsner comment in the Buildings of England series that the original architecture of the church and the architecture of the 1873 additions (shown here in the photograph) create a "jarring contrast". The entry for St Peters Church Formby refers to a sundial located near the porch entrance The entry quotes this as probably eighteenth century This is incorrect the sundial originally had a date on it of 1661 so it is seventeenth century not eighteenth See "Formby Parish Church" by Cannon H P Barsley 1955

== Associated features ==
In the churchyard to the south of the church is a sundial dating probably from the 18th century. This is in stone and consists of a Tuscan column with a square abacus decorated with cyma moulding. On the top of the sundial is a metal plate but the gnomon is missing. The sundial is listed at Grade II.

A cross in the churchyard is a restored version of one initially erected by members of the 12th battalion, King's Liverpool Regiment in September 1916 near Ginchy in northern France. The cross was erected as a memorial to the officers killed during the Battle of the Somme. Attached to the cross is the original metal plaque on which the names of eight officers who had died in the fighting are inscribed. The names include that of the England Test cricketer Kenneth Hutchings.

== Present day ==
St Peter's is an active parish church in the deanery of Sefton, the archdeaconry of Liverpool, and the diocese of Liverpool. It arranges services on Sundays and weekdays. baptisms, weddings and funerals, and runs associated groups and organisations. Music plays an important place in the worship of the church, and a mixed choir sings at the main services.

== See also ==
- Listed buildings in Formby
