= St Luke's Church, Formby =

Coordinates: 53.5521°N 3.0873°W

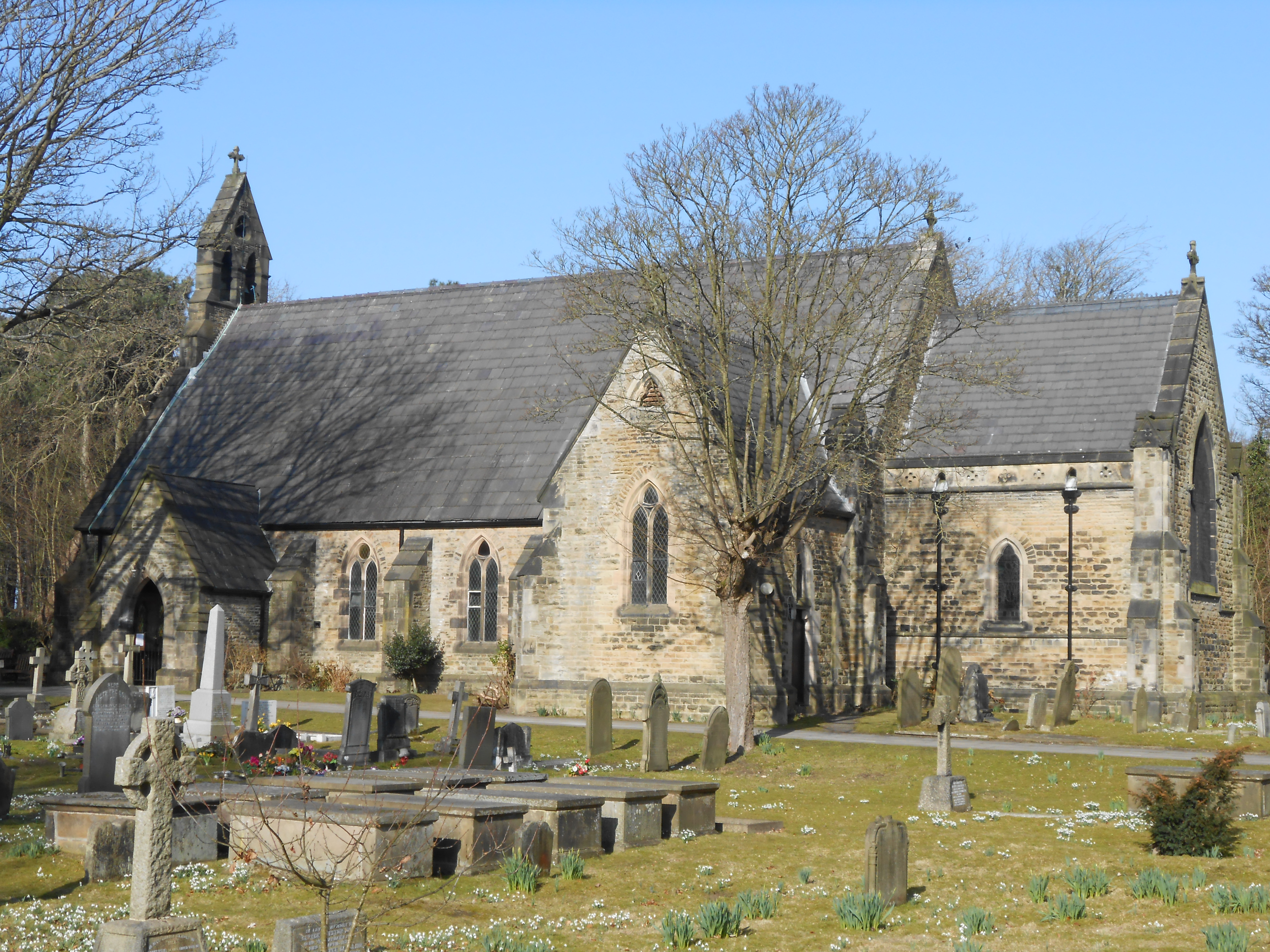
- St Luke's Church, Formby, from the south

- Location in Merseyside
- OS grid reference: SD 281 067
- Location: St Luke's Church Road, Formby, Sefton, Merseyside
- Country: England
- Denomination: Church of England
- Churchmanship: Low Church / Evangelical
- Website: stlukesformby.org.uk

History
- Status: Parish church
- Dedication: Saint Luke
- Consecrated: 14 December 1854

Architecture
- Functional status: Active
- Heritage designation: Grade II
- Designated: 19 July 1966
- Architect: William Culshaw
- Architectural type: Church
- Style: Gothic Revival
- Groundbreaking: 1854
- Completed: 1897

Specifications
- Materials: Stone, slate roof

Administration
- Province: York
- Diocese: Liverpool
- Archdeaconry: Knowsley & Sefton
- Deanery: Sefton North
- Parish: St Luke, Formby

Clergy
- Vicar: Rev Dr Matt Davis

St Luke's Church is in St Luke's Church Road, Formby, Sefton, Merseyside, England, and is an active Anglican parish church in the diocese of Liverpool. The original chapel on the site was destroyed by a sandstorm in 1739. It was replaced by the present church in 1854, and this was extended in 1897. The church is recorded in the National Heritage List for England as a designated Grade II listed building.

== History ==
Little is known of the early history of the church, but the presence of a 12th-century font in the church is evidence that it stands on an ancient site. This church was destroyed in a sandstorm in 1739. The idea for rebuilding a church on the site came in the 1840s from Rev Miles Formby, former vicar of St Thomas, Melling. He died in 1849, but the building of the church was continued by his older brother Dr Richard Formby, who owned and donated the land. The money for building the church was given by Miles' widow and his sister, Mary. The church was dedicated to Saint Luke, the patron saint of doctors. It was designed by the Liverpool architect William Culshaw. At this time only the nave and porch were built, and these were consecrated by the Rt Revd John Graham, bishop of Chester, on 14 December 1854. The chancel and transepts were added in 1897, and paid for by Caroline, daughter of Dr Richard Formby.

== Architecture ==
St Luke's is constructed in rock-faced stone with ashlar dressings and slate roofs. It consists of a five-bay nave, north and south transepts, a chancel, a south porch, and a bellcote on the west gable. Along the sides of the nave the bays are separated by buttresses and contain two-light windows containing Geometrical tracery. At the west end are diagonal buttresses, a three-light window with a hood mould above, and a rose window over that. The transepts contain two-light windows, and at the corners of the chancel are angle buttresses. The east window has three lights, and surmounting the chancel is a parapet pierced with quatrefoils.

Inside the church is a simple Norman font decorated with rope moulding. In the porch is the gravestone of Richard Formby (died 1407), an armour bearer to Henry IV. This was brought from York Minster to replace a facsimile gravestone given by Richard Formby. The stained glass in the west window includes medical inscriptions, and the rose window above contains depictions of local flowers. The original pipe organ was built in 1909 by the Orchestrelle Company. This was replaced in 1958 by a two-manual organ by Henry Willis & Sons. In about 1970 it was moved from the south to the north transept and altered by Francis Kitts Ainscough, but has since been removed from the church. The present organ is a three-manual electronic organ made by Phoenix.

== Appraisal ==
The church was designated as a Grade II listed building on 19 July 1966. Grade II is the lowest of the three grades of listing and is applied to buildings that are "nationally important and of special interest". The architectural historians Pollard and Pevsner in the Buildings of England series comment that the interior is "somewhat dreary".

== Associated features ==
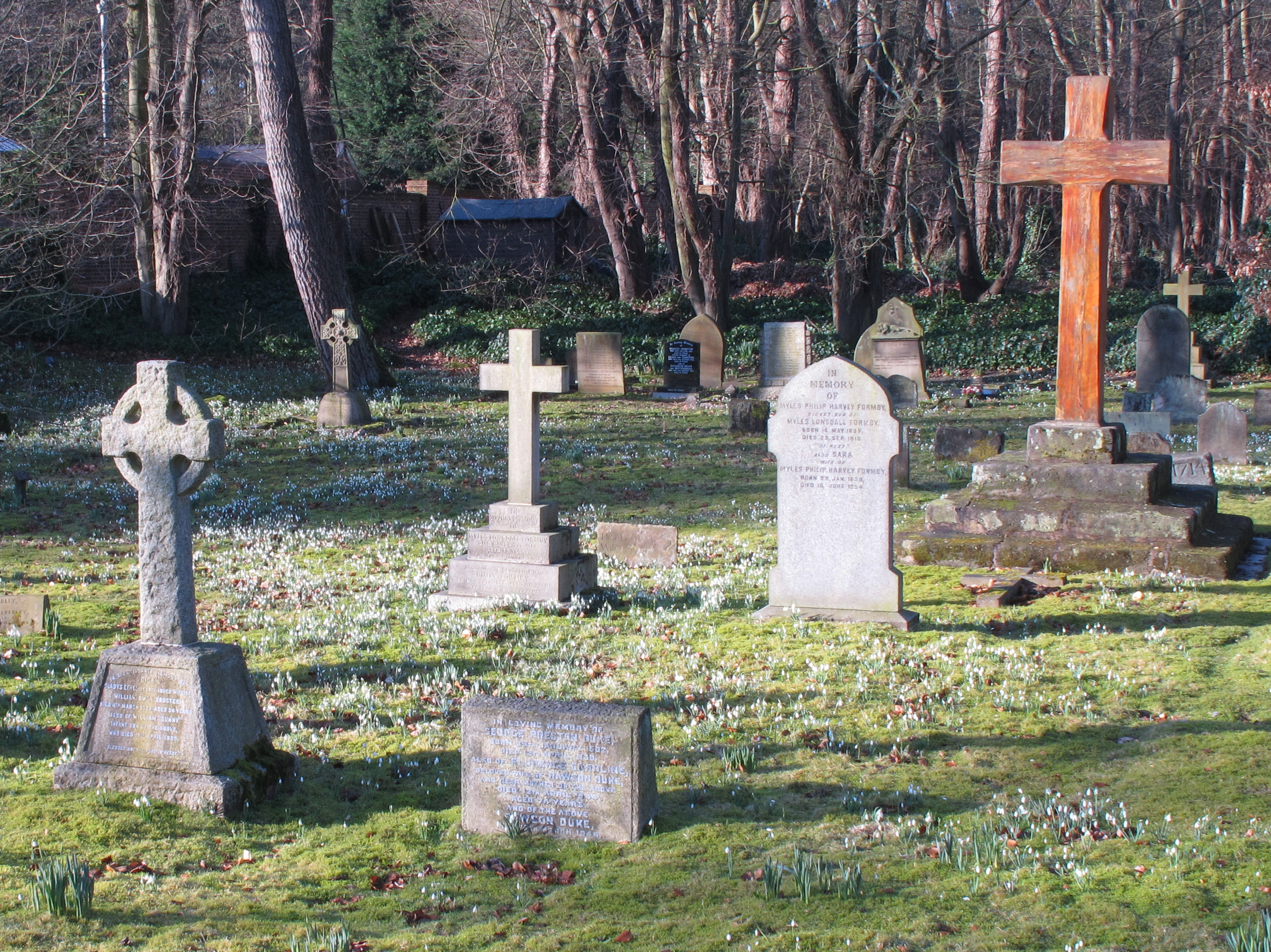
St Luke's churchyard, showing the cross and, at the back of the churchyard, the stocks

The oldest gravestone in the churchyard is dated 1666. To the south of the church is a cross base of unknown age that was moved here from Cross Green in 1879. It consists of three square steps with a socket for the stem of a cross, and is designated as a Grade II listed building. There had been a wooden cross in the socket, but by 1985 it had been removed. It was replaced by a new wooden cross as a Millennium project in 2000. Further to the south is an inscribed stone about 420 mm high of unknown age that has been traditionally associated with funeral rites. It has an irregular shape with one flat face inscribed with a cross on a stepped base surmounted by a circle. It is also listed at Grade II. The third object to be designated at Grade II are the old village stocks dating from the 18th century, which were moved from a site near Cross Green to the west side of the churchyard. The stocks consist of two stone piers with slots for wooden boards, and between the piers is an iron bar. Also in the churchyard is the grave of Percy French (1854–1920), Irish songwriter and entertainer.

== Present day ==
St Luke's is located to the west of the town of Formby, and is surrounded by pine trees. It is an active parish church in the deanery of Sefton North, the archdeaconry of Knowsley & Sefton, and the diocese of Liverpool. The church arranges services on Sundays and weekdays, baptisms, weddings and funerals, and organises a variety of groups.

== See also ==
- Listed buildings in Formby
