= Formby =

Town in Merseyside, England

Coordinates: 53.5586°N 3.0666°W

- Town
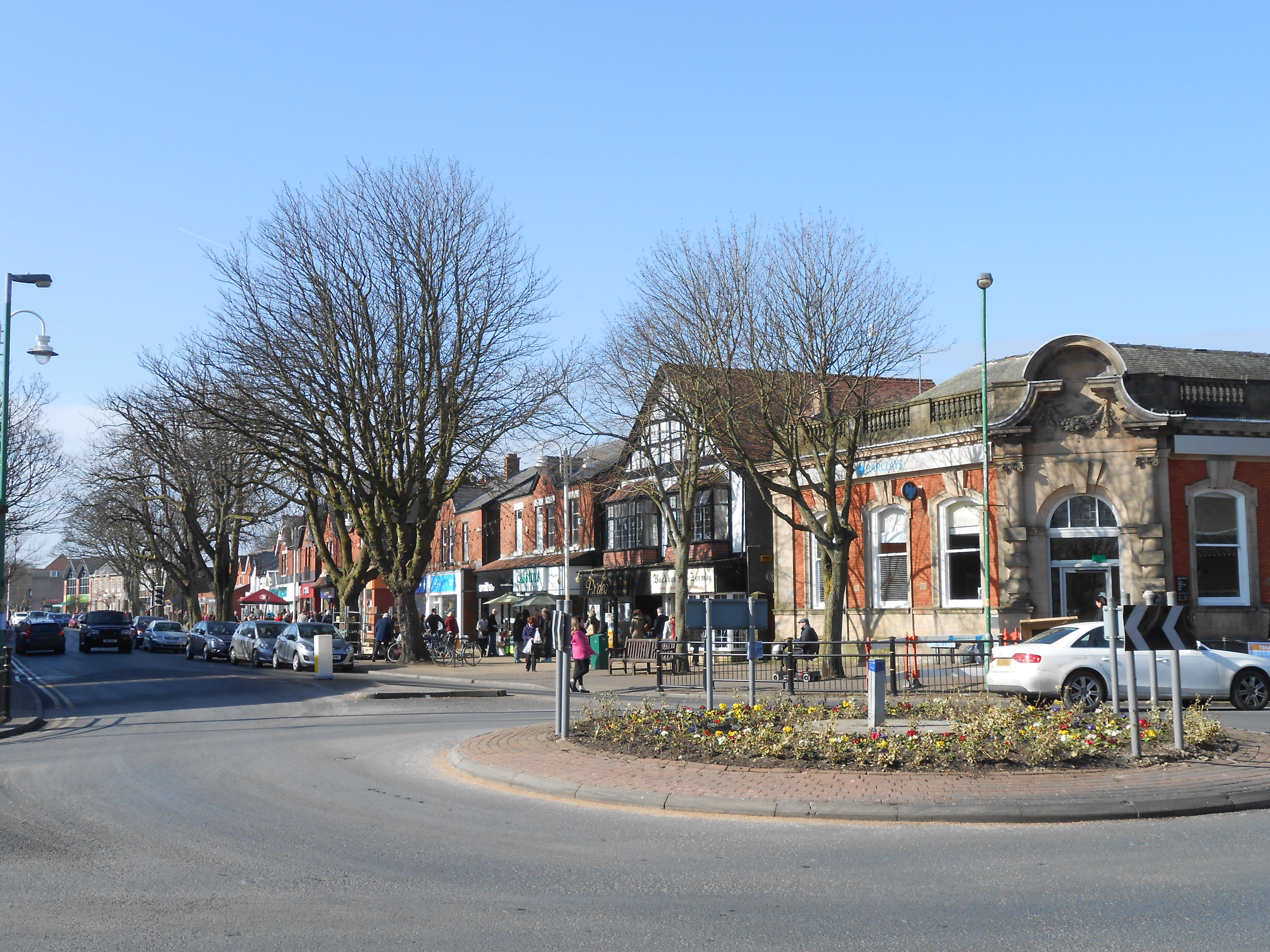
- Formby Town Centre

- Location within Merseyside
- Population: 22,886 (2021)
- OS grid reference: SD293074
- Civil parish: Formby
- Metropolitan borough: Sefton
- Metropolitan county: Merseyside
- Region: North West
- Country: England
- Sovereign state: United Kingdom
- Districts of the town: List: Freshfield; Great Altcar (Village); Little Altcar (Village)
- Post town: LIVERPOOL
- Postcode district: L37
- Dialling code: 01704
- Police: Merseyside
- Fire: Merseyside
- Ambulance: North West
- UK Parliament: Sefton Central

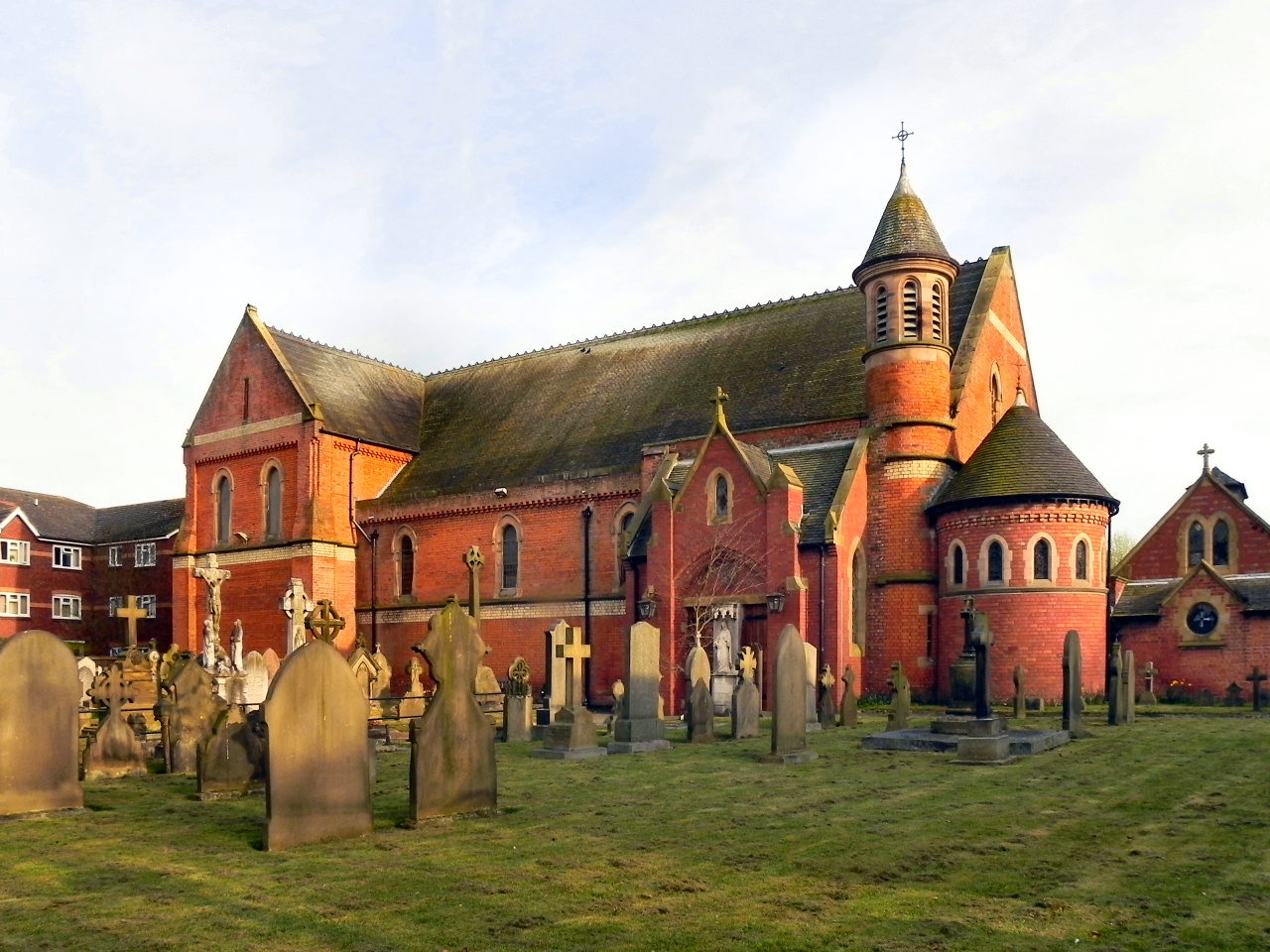
Our Lady of Compassion Church, Formby

Formby is a town and civil parish in the Metropolitan Borough of Sefton, Merseyside, England.

Historically in Merseyside, three manors are recorded in the Domesday Book of 1086 under "Fornebei", Halsall, Walton and Poynton. Cockle raking and shrimp fishing lasted into the 19th century. By 1872, the township and sub-district was made up of two chapelries (St Peter's and St Luke's), Birkdale township, the hamlets of Ainsdale and Raven-Meols and Altcar parish. Formby was built on the plain adjoining the Irish Sea coast a few miles north of the Crosby channel.

A commuter town for Liverpool, Formby is also a tourist destination with day trippers attracted to its beaches, sand dunes and wildlife, particularly the endangered red squirrel and natterjack toad. The area is conserved by the National Trust, and designated a Site of Special Scientific Interest.

== History ==
Erosion of sand on the beach at Formby is revealing layers of mud and sediment, laid down in the late Mesolithic to the late Neolithic, approximately 8,000 – 5,000 years ago, and covered in the early Bronze Age. These sediments often contain the footprints of humans and animals (red deer, roe deer, wild boar, wolf, aurochs) and birds (oystercatcher, crane and other waders) from that period. In June 2016, over 50 human footprints from 7,000 years ago were uncovered on the beach.

The common place-name suffix -by is from the Scandinavian byr meaning "homestead", "settlement" or "village". The village of Formby was originally spelt Fornebei and means "the old settlement" or "village belonging to Forni". At that time Fornibiyum was also a well-known Norse family name. He could have been the leader of the invading expedition which took possession of this coast. Until its closure in 1998, Oslo Airport in Norway was situated in a town called Fornebu.

It was from Ireland in about 960 AD that these Norsemen or Vikings first came to the west coast of Lancashire, initially trading or raiding and then settling. Tradition says that the Viking invaders failed to defeat the native Anglo-Saxons on the coast of Formby, so they sailed inland, up the River Alt, and attacked from the rear.

Formby Hall is a Grade II listed building dating back to 1223. It has traditionally been the home of the lords of the manor. Much of the land around it is now a golf course.

Formby Beach is the location of the first lifeboat station in the world. It is believed to have been established as early as 1776 by William Hutchinson, the Dock Master for the Liverpool Common Council. Although no exact record has been found, the boat used is believed to have been a 'Mersey Gig'. The last launch from the station took place in 1916. Remarkably, a film of this event survived. The foundations of the last of the lifeboat station buildings remain on the beach to this day. In 2016, the newly opened Wetherspoons pub in the town was named 'The Lifeboat' in honour of the original lifeboat station.

Formby is home to RAF Woodvale, a small RAF station to the north of the town. The airfield opened in 1941 and is a former Second World War fighter station with three active runways, the main runway being a mile in length. Today it is used by RAF for light aircraft and fighter training, as well as a few civilian aircraft. The station was also home to Merseyside Police's helicopter, known as 'Mike One'. The RAF station was also home to the last operational service of WWII fighter plane the Supermarine Spitfire. In 1957 the last Spitfire to fly operationally with British military markings took off from RAF Woodvale. Woodvale is also home to the Woodvale Rally, one of the biggest shows on an active MOD station in the North West.

== Governance ==
Until 1974, Formby was an urban district (Formby Urban District) within the administrative county of Lancashire. Since 1 April 1974, it has formed part of the Metropolitan Borough of Sefton, in Merseyside.

Prior to 1983 Formby was in the parliamentary constituency of Ormskirk and after Ormskirk's abolition was made part of the Crosby constituency. The Member of Parliament (MP) for Crosby from 1997 until 2010 was Claire Curtis-Thomas, a member of the Labour Party, prior to her election the seat was generally considered to be a safe Conservative Party stronghold with Tory MPs elected at every election barring the 1981 Crosby by-election when Shirley Williams of the Social Democratic Party was elected to represent the constituency.

As a result of the Crosby constituency being abolished for the 2010 general election, Formby is part of the newly created Sefton Central constituency, represented by Bill Esterson, a member of the Labour Party. Sefton Central is now considered a safe Labour seat.

For elections to Sefton Council, Formby is divided between two electoral wards with three councillors each. As of May 2023, Harington ward, whose councillors are Peter Harvey (Labour), Carol Richards (Labour) and Joe Riley (Conservative); and Ravenmeols ward, whose councillors are Catie Page (Labour), Christopher Page (Labour) and Nina Killen (Labour). Locally Formby is governed by Formby Parish Council.

== Geography ==
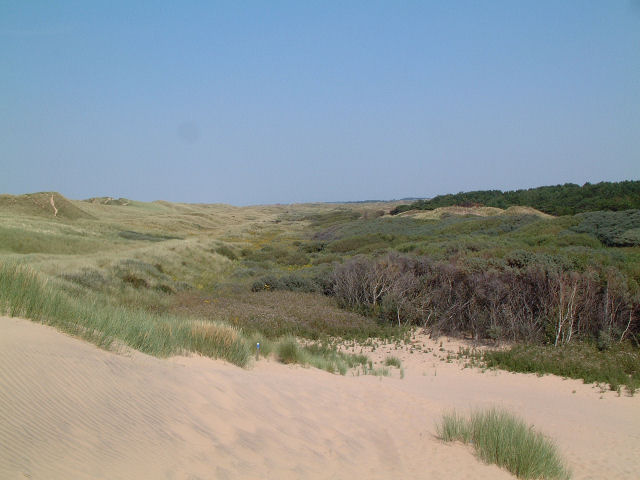
Formby Beach looking toward Liverpool

Formby is a coastal town, with an area of roughly 7 sq miles (17 km^{2}), located in the borough of Sefton. The town is built upon the west of a large flat area of land called the West Lancashire Coastal Plain. Formby's highest point is within the sand dunes that separate the Irish Sea from Formby. However, these sand dunes are ever-changing in shape and formation, so there is no fixed point.

The land between Formby and the areas of Southport, Ormskirk and Liverpool is green belt land and is mostly used for arable agricultural purposes. The areas around the urban fringe are drained by irrigation ditches and open areas get boggy in the winter months. Earth in urban areas is well drained, very loose and sandy.

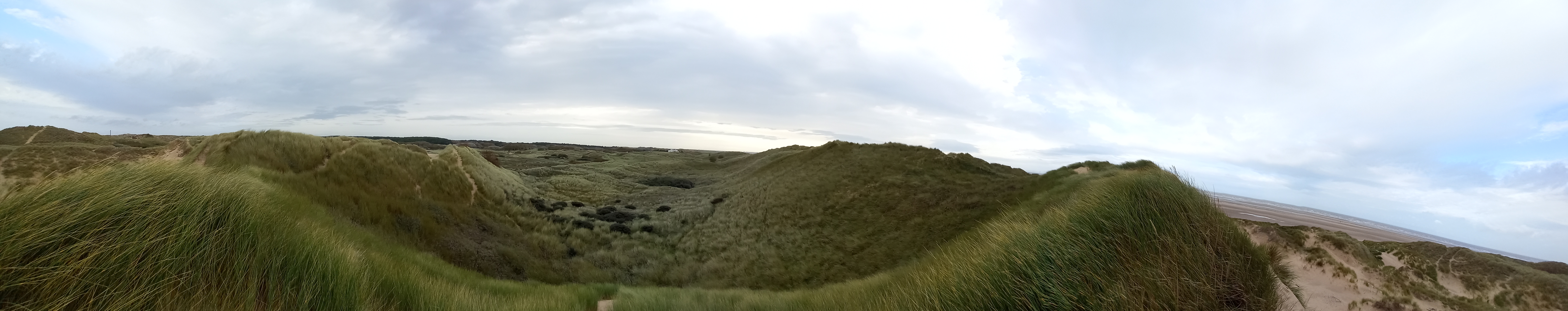
Formby Sand Dunes

The section of land between Formby and the coast is varied in vegetation, wildlife and terrain. This area includes pine forests (both natural and man-made), sand dunes, marram grass, deciduous woodland, seasonal ponds and lakes. Large areas of this land are protected by the National Trust. The southern boundary of the town partially follows the course of the River Alt which enters the Irish Sea just south of Formby at Hightown.

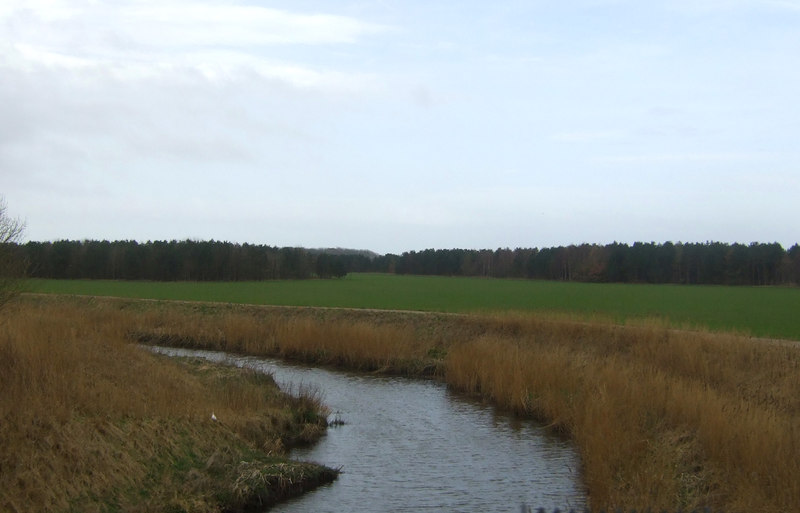

Formby is in a temperate climate zone, with mild winters and warm summers. Formby's coastline faces an ongoing threat from water-based erosion, with high tides washing away yards of sand dunes. In an attempt to stem this, in some years discarded Christmas trees are collected and planted by rangers and volunteers to help slow this effect.

== Economy ==
The main shopping area is known locally as 'The Village', in which the town upholds an array of shops including some independent outlets. The majority of these shops are located along the streets of Chapel Lane and Brows Lane, which also contains a number of coffee houses, banks, travel agents, estate agents and charity shops. This tree-lined Avenue runs for about a third of a mile, with shops either side of it. 'The village' further branches out onto Elbow Lane, Three Tuns Lane, Halsall Lane and School Lane, where more shops are located.

There are several other smaller shopping areas around Formby and Freshfield, mostly convenience stores and specialist outlets, such as an optician and a model shop. Formby also has a main post office and two smaller post offices.

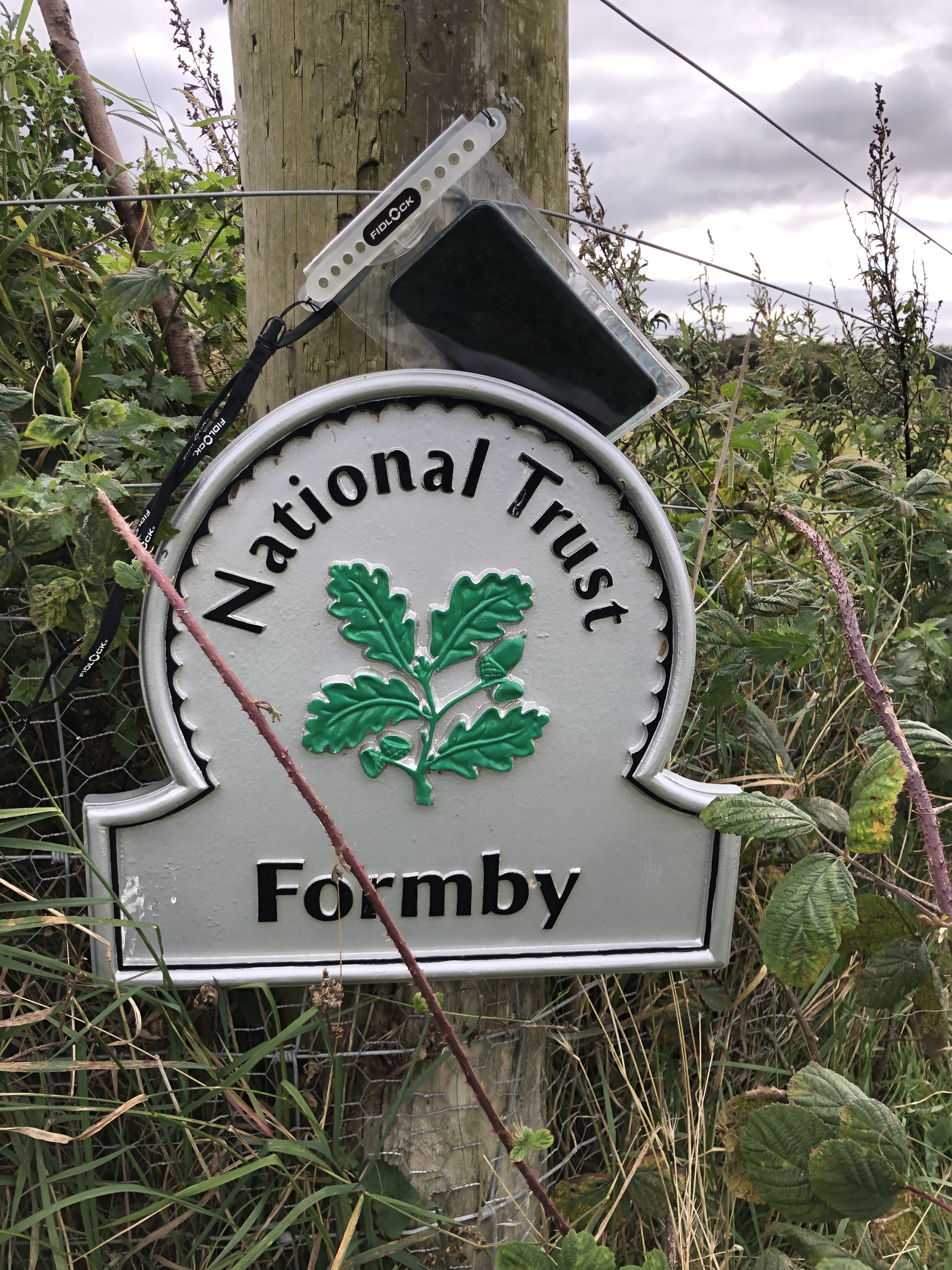
National Trust – Formby

The town has several supermarkets including a Tesco, Marks & Spencer's SimplyFood, Waitrose and Iceland. Formby has no major industries; however, there is a small industrial estate on the outskirts of the town, on which a McDonald's is located. A recent study of the town showed that between 10%–30% of its residents commute to either Liverpool or Southport

=== Tourism ===
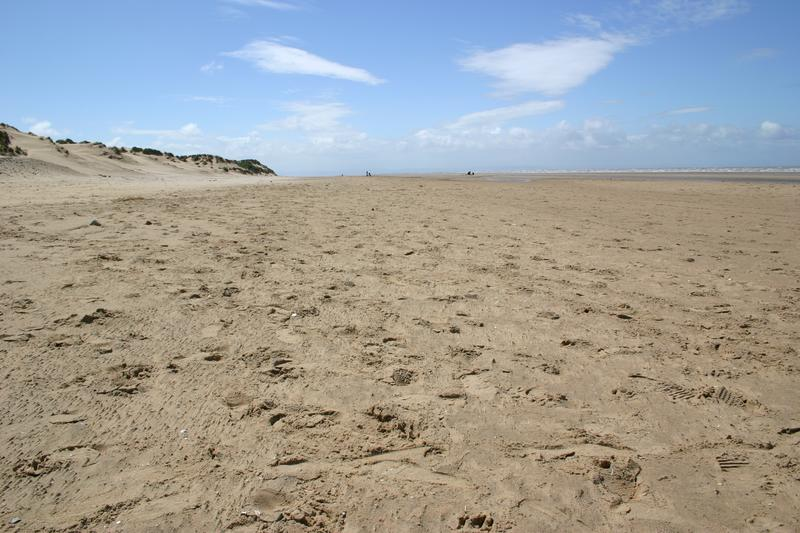
Formby Beach

Formby has a significant tourist industry, most notably between the warmer months of May and September. In particular, it is popular with day trippers from across the North West. There are two main spots along the Formby Coast which are particularly popular with the public.

The Lifeboat Road site is about 1½ miles from the town centre; there are three linked unpaved car parks with several routes cascading out into the sand dunes and woods. The car parks are about 900 yards from the beach and there is a charge to park there.

Victoria Road is north of Lifeboat Road and is busier due to the red squirrel reserve being located here, as well as it being the starting point for the asparagus trail. The reserve begins at the junction of Larkhill Lane and Victoria Road. Like Lifeboat Road, there is a charge to park from this point onwards. Parking is available adjacent to the reserve and at the end of the road, there is a large unpaved car park for easier beach access. The beach is located approximately 100 yards from the car park.

There is a privately run caravan park called Formby Point Caravan Park on Lifeboat Road, open between March and October. There are around 300 caravans on the park and 20 plots for touring caravans. There is a phone box, public toilet and a play area on site and, until 1995, there was a small convenience store. Additionally, there is a smaller caravan site called Freshfield Caravan Park.

== Transport ==
Formby Bypass (A565) was built during 1936–37 to take the major Liverpool to Southport route out of Formby and cut alongside the fringe of the town. The bypass is a dual carriageway with two roundabouts and three sets of traffic lights. It has been the scene of many accidents, some fatal and there are calls from some for the scrapping of a proposed motorway link as a result. The B5195 links Formby with Ormskirk and Maghull. Motorways are easily accessible, the M58 and M57 are both 6 miles from Formby..

There are two railway stations: Formby railway station and, less than a mile north, Freshfield railway station. Both are on the Northern Line of the Merseyrail network, which has traditionally run from Hunts Cross to Southport. However, from August 25, 2024, this service now terminates at Liverpool Central, with the Hunt's Cross service now running to Ormskirk. Trains are frequent (typically every 15 minutes) and are a popular way of commuting, especially to the city centre of Liverpool.

Bus services in the town are provided by Arriva North West, Stagecoach Merseyside & South Lancashire from Preston Depot and Merseytravel. These include services to Southport, Ince Blundell, Liverpool, Southport and Formby District General Hospital and Merseytravel's Formby circular routes.

The nearest commercial airport is in Liverpool which is 17 miles away. Manchester Airport is 36 miles away. Liverpool Airport is reachable using Liverpool's suburban railway network, Merseyrail, via Liverpool South Parkway.

London is under two hours away via train from Liverpool Lime Street railway station which is 11 miles / 30 minutes drive from Formby, or from Runcorn railway station which is 25 miles / 45 minutes drive.

In addition to motorised transport, Formby is served by excellent cycle routes, mainly centring on the pinewoods along the coast leading to both Southport and Liverpool. There are also many cycle lanes on the roads leading to the larger conurbations to the north and south.

== Education ==
There are seven primary schools in Formby, namely Woodlands, Redgate CP, Our Lady of Compassion RC, St Jerome's RC, Trinity St Peters C. of E., Freshfield CP and St Luke's C. of E. Trinity St Peter's C. of E. in Formby is the amalgamation of two former primary schools – St Peter's and Holy Trinity – the latter of which closed in July 2006. The school was formed as part of a major reorganisation of primary education in Sefton. Raven Meols Primary School also closed as a school and is now used as a Community Centre.

Formby has two large high schools, Formby High School and Range High School and also had an independent high school focussing on Educational and Behaviour difficulties teaching, Clarence House. The independent school was permanently closed as of 2018 and residential units demolished. Clarence House was owned by Nugent Care, a registered charity, who also governs Clumber Lodge, a children's home in Formby.

== Media ==
Local news and television programmes are provided by BBC North West and ITV Granada. Television signals are received from the Winter Hill TV transmitter.

Local radio stations are BBC Radio Merseyside, Heart North West, Hits Radio Liverpool, Smooth North West, Greatest Hits Radio Liverpool & The North West, and Dune Radio, a community based station.

The town is served by these local newspapers:

- Southport Visiter (formerly Formby Times)
- Southport Reporter
- Liverpool Echo

== Scouting ==
Formby has a long tradition of scouting dating back to 1909, just over a year after Baden Powell's legendary experimental camp on Brownsea Island in Dorset in 1907. The first Scout group in the town, named the 1st Formby, was set up at Holy Trinity Church Hall by Mr Murray Spense. There are currently a handful of active groups out of the nine that were initially set up over the last century, especially since the 1960s housing estates expanded the town.

Scouts can be seen marching through the village every year on St George's Day.

== Wildlife ==
To the west of the town lie pinewoods and sand dunes. The whole of the coastline here is managed as a Special Area of Conservation (SAC) for its important wildlife reserves by Sefton Coast Partnership. The pine woods at Victoria Road have been established as a National Trust reserve for the red squirrel, listed on the endangered species list. Formby is one of several sites in Britain where the red squirrel can still be found although it is now being threatened by the grey squirrel.

Formby is also notable for the presence of natterjack toads. Formby is one of only a few sites in England where they will breed. Later in the evening the male's distinctive song can be heard and is known locally as the 'Bootle Organ'. In spring the males gather at the edge of shallow pools in the dune slacks and sing to attract a mate.

== Sport ==
This stretch of coast is famous for links golf courses such as Southport & Ainsdale, Hillside, West Lancashire, Hesketh and Royal Birkdale. Formby is home to another championship quality golf course – Formby Golf Club. However, the club, unlike its neighbour Royal Birkdale, does not have the capacity to host large events such as The Open Championship. Formby has a cricket club based down Cricket Path in Freshfield that plays in the Liverpool and District Cricket Competition; this also has squash courts and a large AstroTurf hockey pitch.

The town also had a football team called Formby F.C. who played in the North West Counties Football League First Division. They played at Altcar Road, behind Tesco just off the A565 Formby Bypass, having moved in the summer of 2002 from their town centre home at Brows Lane. That site is now occupied by Formby Pool which opened on 27 January 2007. The biggest game in the club's history was in November 1973 when they faced Oldham Athletic in the First Round of the F.A Cup.

In addition, a variety of youth sporting groups are based in Formby. These include Formby Junior Sports Club (FJSC) known locally as "Rourke's League" after Jim Rourke MBE (1912–2006) who founded the club on 2 January 1959. Rourke continued to attend the club into his 90s. Over 600 children ranging in age from 5 to 16 years meet at Deansgate Lane Playing Fields to play football at various times throughout Saturday mornings during the football season. The club welcomes children of all abilities, there are no trials or criteria to meet; every member plays every week. The club also fields numerous representative teams in local junior leagues (e.g. the Craven Minor League). Formby is also home to Formby Dons Football Club, who operate 3 teams, playing their home games at Duke Street Park. In 2007, Formby Vikings Rugby Union Team was established to include a wide range of ages including a colts first 15 team.

== People ==
=== Footballers ===
Many current and former professional footballers and football managers, the majority of whom are linked to Liverpool FC or Everton FC, currently live or have lived in the town, including:

- Joe Allen
- Leighton Baines
- Alan Ball
- Mario Balotelli
- Ross Barkley
- Stig Inge Bjørnebye
- Fabio Borini
- Andy Carroll
- Ray Clemence
- Joe Cole
- Stewart Downing
- Fabinho
- David Fairclough
- Duncan Ferguson
- Steven Gerrard
- Joe Gomez
- Jordan Henderson
- Tony Hibbert
- Emlyn Hughes
- Sami Hyypiä
- Andoni Iraola, since becoming Liverpool FC manager in 2026
- Howard Kendall
- Jürgen Klopp, during his time as Liverpool FC manager
- Adam Lallana
- Rickie Lambert
- Yerry Mina
- Iliman Ndiaye
- Phil Neal
- Mike Newell
- Divock Origi
- Andrew Robertson
- Brendan Rodgers, during his time as Liverpool FC manager
- Wayne Rooney
- Neil Ruddock
- Alan Shearer, during his time at Blackburn Rovers
- Gylfi Sigurðsson
- Arne Slot, during his time as Liverpool FC manager
- Raheem Sterling
- Alan Stubbs (who also owned Woodwards Winebar in the village)
- John Toshack

=== Other notable people include ===
- Beryl Bainbridge, English novelist
- Alex Blanchard, brother of Annabel Blanchard, professional women's footballer
- John Birt, former director of the BBC
- Edward Craig, philosopher and former cricketer
- Tymon Dogg, musician
- Angela Eagle, Labour MP and former minister
- Maria Eagle, Labour MP and former minister
- Kevin McNamara, former Labour MP and shadow minister
- Chris Chibnall, television writer and producer
- Percy French, Irish songwriter and entertainer (died and buried in Formby)
- Thomas Fresh, public health pioneer
- John Garstang, archaeologist (worked at Liverpool University and resided at Thornbury on Freshfield Road, Formby)
- Christopher Hope, journalist
- Frank McLardy, member of the British Union of Fascists and Waffen-SS British Free Corps
- Robert Molyneux, Jesuit missionary to the United States
- Sir John Moores, founder of Littlewoods
- John Parrott, snooker player
- Sir David Radcliffe, Mayor of Liverpool
- Andrew Sumner, movie journalist and TCM presenter
- Rhian Teasdale, lead singer of Wet Leg
- Matt Williams, AKA - "Dr Mosh". BBC sports broadcaster and personality

The notable music hall entertainer George Formby Sr. adopted his stage name after seeing it as a destination on a railway carriage. His son George Formby Jr. used the same stage name.

== See also ==
- Listed buildings in Formby

== Gallery ==
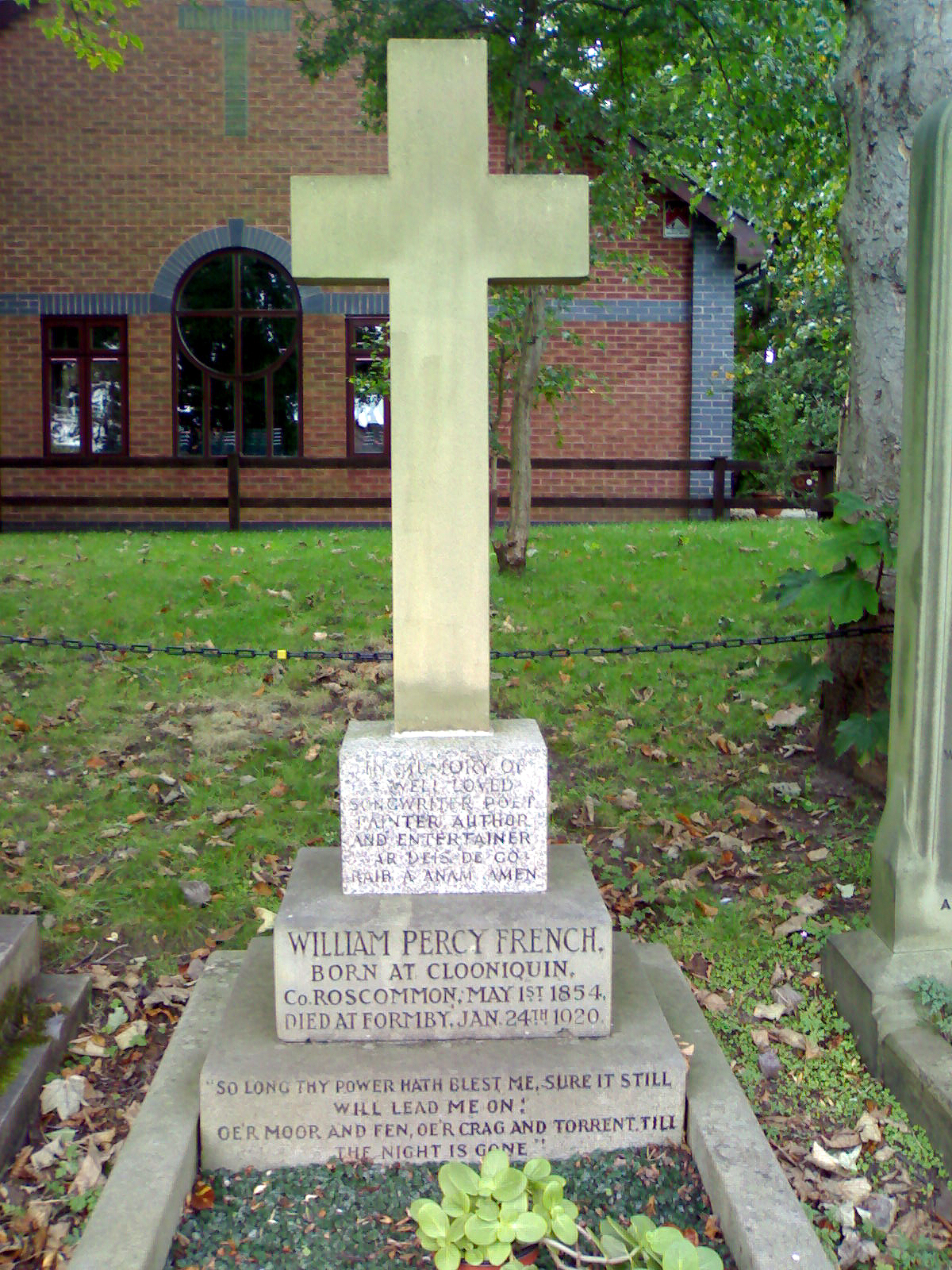
Grave of Percy French

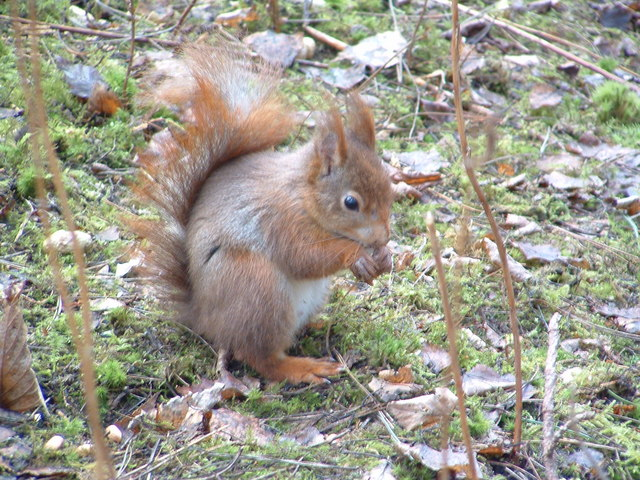
Red squirrel feeding

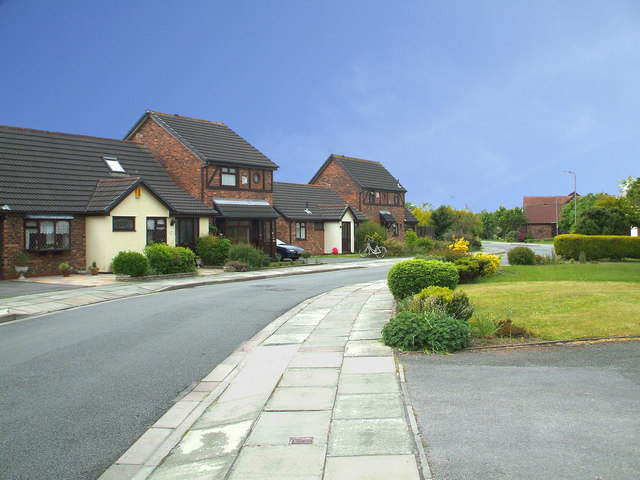
Housing in Formby

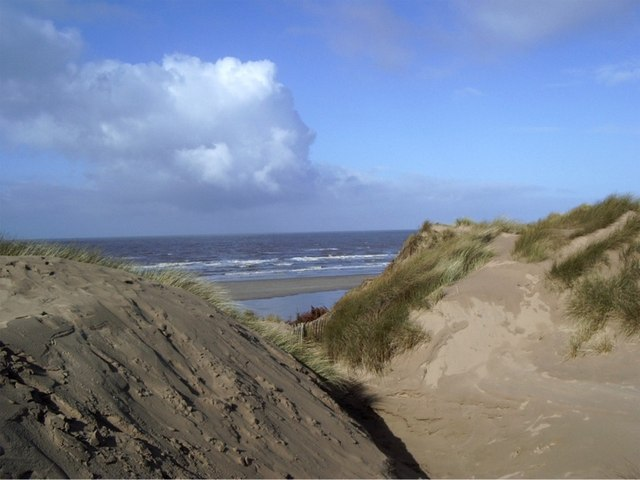
Formby Beach sand dunes
