= Culshaw and Sumners =

English architecture and surveying firm

William Culshaw
- Born: 1807; Ormskirk, Lancashire, England
- Died: 1874 (aged 66–67); Liverpool, England
- Occupations: Surveyor, architect

Henry Sumners
- Born: 1825; Liverpool, England
- Died: 1895 (aged 69–70)
- Occupation: Architect

Culshaw and Sumners was a firm of English architects and surveyors who practised in Liverpool in the 19th and early 20th centuries. The work of the practice reflected the growing economic prosperity of the city during this period. Much of its work was routine and mundane, but it did produce some notable buildings, including office blocks, warehouses, domestic properties, workhouses, churches, and a hospital. The firm was established by 1839 by William Culshaw, who was joined by Henry Sumners in 1861. Following Culshaw's death in 1874, the practice was continued until 1916 by his son, Alfred.

== History ==
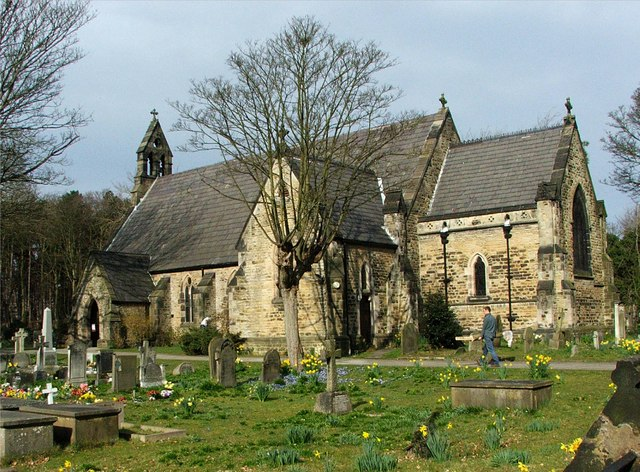
St Luke's Church, Formby (1852–55)

The firm was founded by 1839 by William Culshaw (1807–74) who had moved to Liverpool in about 1834 to join a firm of architects and surveyors. He practised on his own for over 20 years until in 1861 Henry Sumners (1825–95) joined him to manage the architectural side of the practice. In 1866 they formed a partnership and were known as Culshaw and Sumners. The partnership continued until March 1873, being dissolved when Culshaw took his eldest son, Alfred (1849/50–1926), into partnership. William Culshaw died during the following year, and his son continued to run the practice until 1916. For a short period in 1876–77 the practice was known as William Culshaw & Sons, probably because Alfred's brother William H. Culshaw joined the firm, but from 1878 it was known as William Culshaw & Son. The practice worked throughout from an office in Rumford Court, Rumford Street, in the business area of Liverpool.

== William Culshaw ==
William Culshaw was born in Ormskirk, Lancashire, in 1807. His father was a joiner and builder, but William received no formal architectural training. In about 1834 he moved to Liverpool and joined the firm of Leather and Riding, architects and surveyors. This was at a time when there was a building boom in the city, and by 1839 Culshaw had established in his own business as an architect and surveyor. At the time of his death in 1874, he lived in Rodney Street, one of the most prestigious streets in the city, and owned property worth nearly £140,000 (equivalent to £16,420,000 in 2023).

== Henry Sumners ==
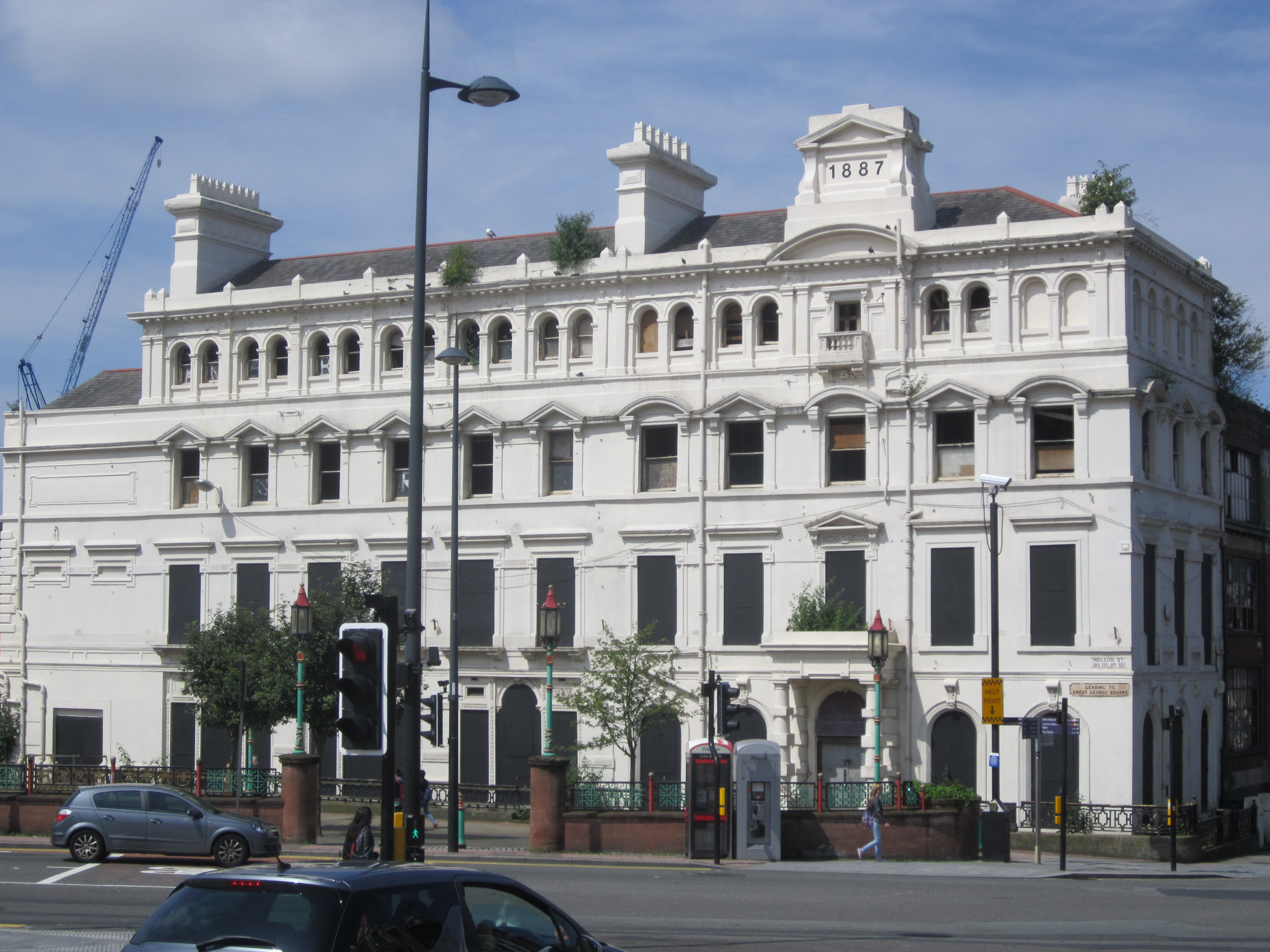
Furniture workshops and showrooms, Nelson Street, Liverpool (c. 1858)

Henry Sumners was born in Liverpool in 1825, the son of a boot-maker in Bold Street. He was apprenticed to the Birkenhead architect Charles Reed (later Verelst), and while there won a competition for the layout of Cressington Park, Liverpool. He then went to London where he worked with architects, including Charles Barry, before undertaking a tour of the Continent to study architecture. Before he joined Culshaw, he had created an imaginative but unexecuted scheme for the development of the area around St George's Hall in Liverpool, and designed two houses in High Victorian Gothic style for Dr Drysdale in Waterloo. Sharples is of the opinion that the arrival of Sumners "marked a watershed in the firm's development". Sumners introduced new features into the designs, and most of the more notable buildings produced by the firm are attributable to him. After leaving the practice in 1873, Sumners continued to design notable buildings, including St Cyprian's Church, in Edge Hill, St Luke's Art Workshops and the display space for the International Exhibition of Navigation, Commerce and Industry. In 1878 he was appointed as president of the Liverpool Architectural Society.

== Practice characteristics ==
The practice is particularly interesting because an archive of over 6.000 documents produced between the mid-1830s and 1873, including over 3,500 drawings, have survived, although there are no associated financial records or correspondence. Almost all the works executed by the firm were in or near Liverpool, with only occasional commissions further afield, for example in Shropshire, Staffordshire, and North Wales, all of which were gained through Liverpool connections. The practice created designs for a large variety of buildings, including houses, shops, office blocks, warehouses, churches, public houses, and shops.

=== 1830s to 1861 ===
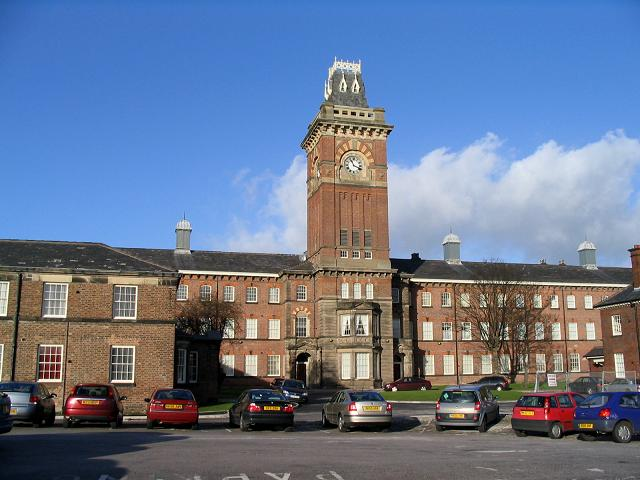
West Derby Union workhouse (1863) later part of Walton Hospital

Initially Culshaw's business "thrived on the office-building frenzy that gripped Liverpool from the 1849s to the 1860s". Culshaw designed about 20 office buildings before he was joined by Sumners, with a similar number afterwards. Many of Culshaw's designs were derived from existing buildings, although he did introduce some new features, including rows of large sash windows to improve the light available for the examination of cotton samples. His designs for these buildings were mainly in Neoclassical style, although he also introduced some Italianate features. Culshaw also designed houses, some of which were in terraces near the city centre, but most were for detached or semi-detached villas in the suburbs. He designed over 50 of the latter, and in addition made plans for extensions or alterations to them. These houses were mainly in Italianate style, either stuccoed, or in brick with stucco dressings. On occasions he introduced Neoclassical, Tudor, and Gothic features. His designs for public houses, shops, and hotels tended to be Neoclassical. He also designed 16 schemes for remodelling or building new warehouses, and created workhouses in Whiston, Ormskirk, Runcorn, and West Derby.

=== 1861 and after ===
Between 1861 and 1866, before Sumners became a partner, his drawings and plans were signed by Culshaw. Sumners introduced more original and eclectic features into his designs, including Renaissance features. The practice continued to design office blocks, houses, churches and institutional buildings. Notable houses included 19 Abercromby Square, Liverpool (1862). and Quarry Bank House, Allerton (1866), and among the churches were St Stephen, Byrom Street (1867–68, since demolished), and Christ Church, Linnet Lane (1867). The architectural historian Nikolaus Pevsner, writing in 1969, was particularly impressed by Sumners' design for a mortuary chapel in Everton (built in 1866, demolished after 1969). Sumners continued the practice's tradition of building workhouses with a complex of buildings at Walton, of which the main block of 23 bays with its clock tower, has survived. The practice also designed Liverpool's Royal Southern Hospital (1867, since demolished).

== Appraisal ==
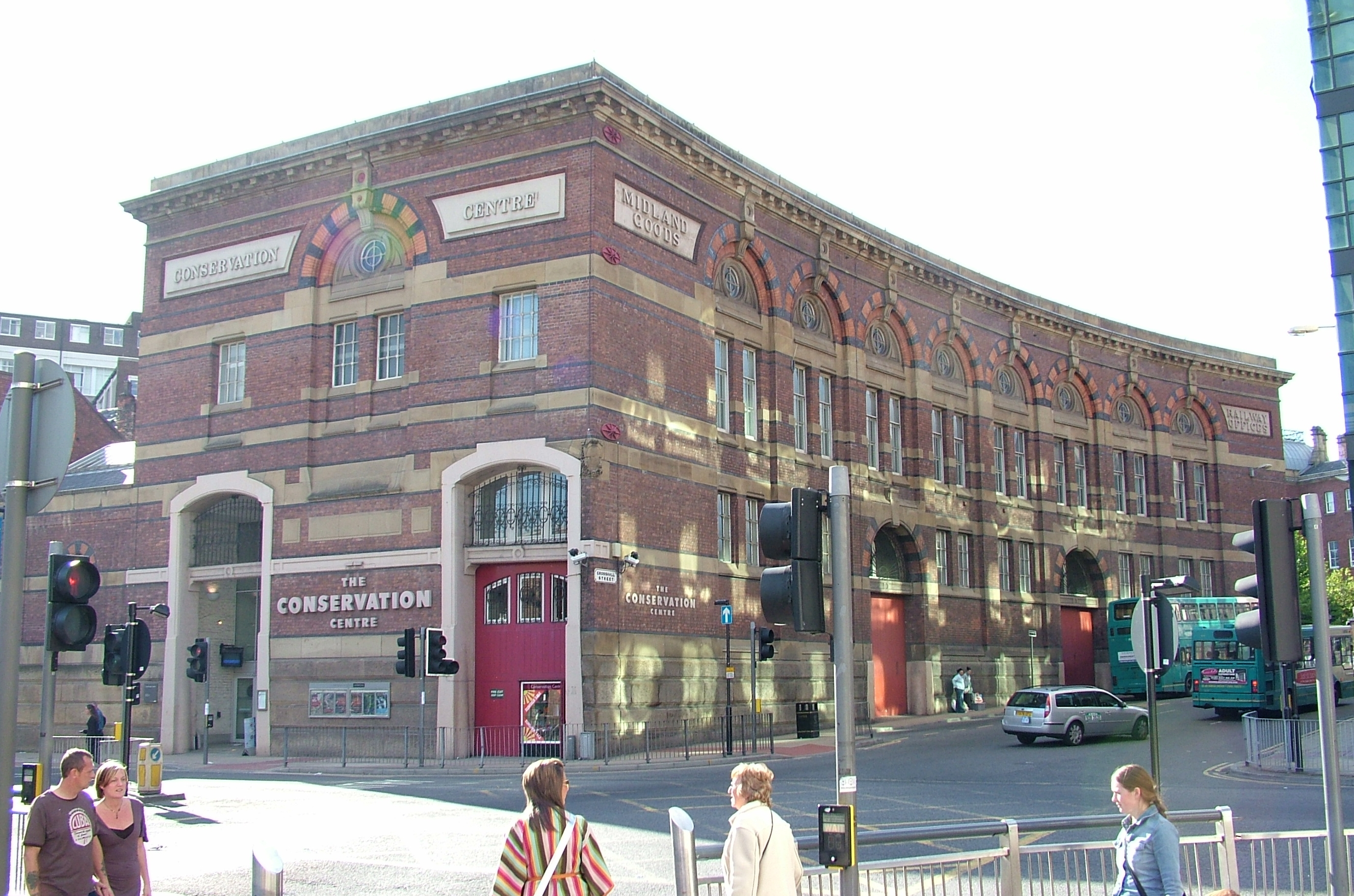
Midland Railway goods warehouse, later the Conservation Centre, Liverpool (1872–74)

Discussing the two main partners, Sharples expresses the opinion that, while Sumners "certainly had talent", Culshaw was "a designer of limited imagination". Two of Culshaw's obituaries suggested that his main skills were as a surveyor and valuer; one obituary stated that his architectural practice was "purely appurtenant to his employment as a surveyor". The archive of documents contains much information about the work of the practice and its clients. Many of the clients were businessmen working from nearby offices, who used the practice not only for works on these and similar premises, but also on their domestic properties. These domestic properties included villas and large houses in the affluent suburbs in and around Liverpool, and further afield. The few domestic commissions outside the immediate area came from the firm's bushiness clients or their relatives. The works further afield included work on outbuildings at Gyrn Castle in North Wales, which was the country house of Sir Edward Bates, a Liverpool merchant and ship-owner, and on Maer Hall in Staffordshire for William Davenport, a relative of Edward Bates.

Although the practice gained a large number of commissions, many of these were for mundane and routine work, such as planning the alteration, extension, or conversion of existing buildings. The firm did create a substantial number of new buildings, some of which have been demolished. Of those remaining, only a few can be considered to be particularly notable. Just 16 new buildings designed by the practice have been designated by English Heritage or Cadw as listed buildings, and all of these are at Grade II, with none at the higher grades. (Note: These are shown in the List of extant works by Culshaw and Sumners. Grade II listing is given to "buildings of national importance and special interest".) The output of the practice is considered by Sharples to be a reflection of "the immense quantity and variety of building generated by the economic powerhouse of Victorian Liverpool".

== See also ==
- List of extant works by Culshaw and Sumners

== References and notes ==
Notes

Citations

Sources

- Hubbard, Edward (1986), Clwyd, The Buildings of Wales, London: Penguin Books, ISBN 0-14-071052-3
- Pevsner, Nikolaus (1974), Staffordshire, The Buildings of England, Harmondsworth: Penguin Books, ISBN 0-14-071046-9
- Pevsner, Nikolaus (1969), South Lancashire, The Buildings of England, Harmondsworth: Penguin Books, ISBN 0-300-09615-1
- Pollard, Richard; Pevsner, Nikolaus (2006), Lancashire: Liverpool and the South-West, The Buildings of England, New Haven and London: Yale University Press, ISBN 0-300-10910-5
- Sharples, Joseph; Pollard, Richard (2004), Liverpool, Pevsner Architectural Guides, New Haven and London: Yale University Press, ISBN 0-300-10258-5
- Sharples, Joseph (2012), "William Culshaw (1807–74) and Henry Sumners (1825–95): rebuilding Victorian Liverpool", in Webster, Christopher (ed.), The Practice of Architecture: eight architects, 1830–1930, Spire Studies in Architectural History, vol. 2, Reading: Spire Books, ISBN 978-1-904965-35-0
