= History of housing in Liverpool =

The city of Liverpool in Merseyside, England includes a diverse variety of historical housing architectures, some dating back several hundred years, from small working class terrace houses to larger mansions, mostly from the Victorian era. While many remain in the present day, large numbers were demolished and redeveloped during the slum clearances of the 1960s and 1970s and of those that survived, many have since been refurbished.

== Georgian era ==
=== Early housing ===
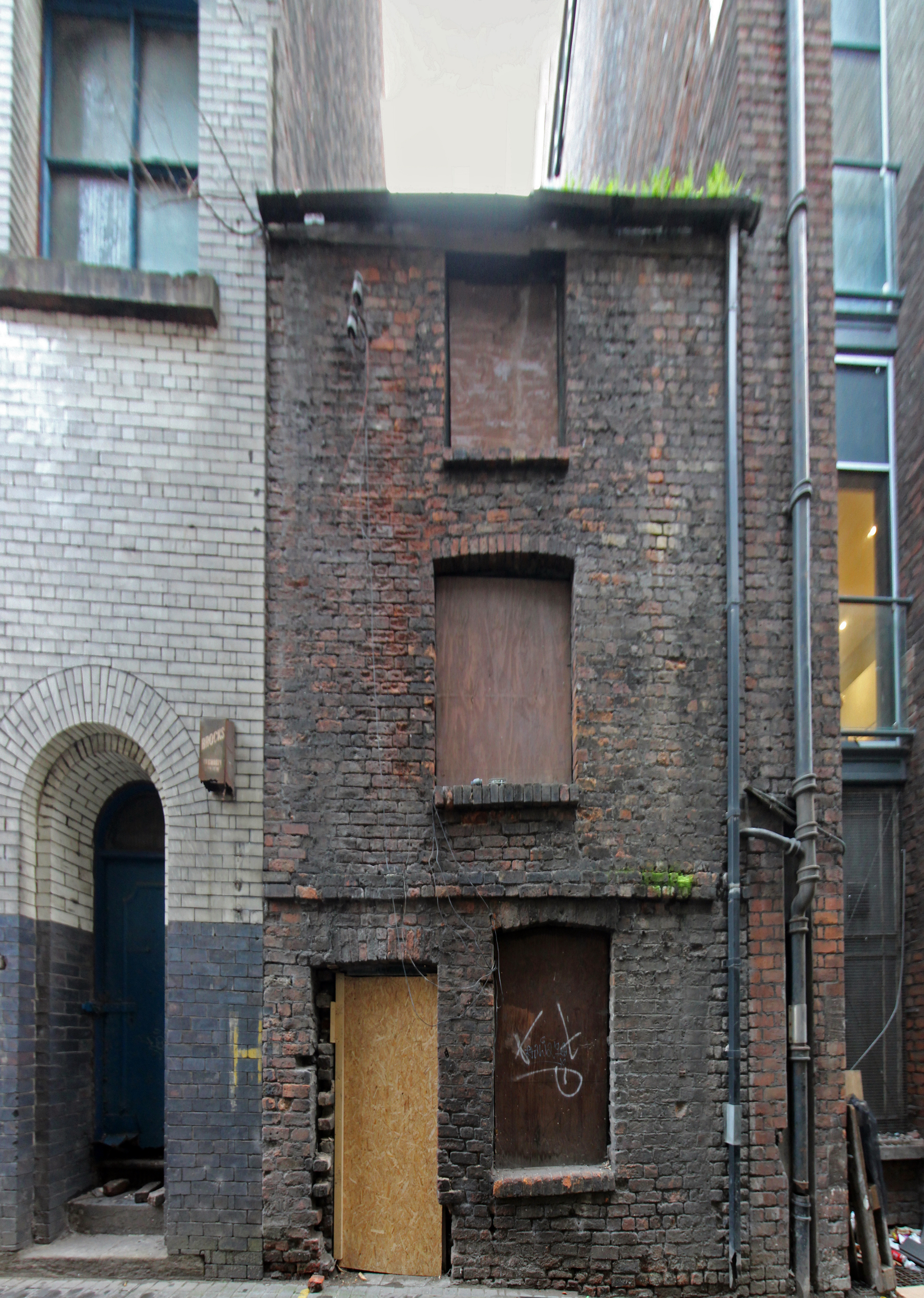
Facade of 10 Hockenhall Alley, in a derelict state, November 2018

One of the earliest surviving houses in Liverpool is believed to be 10 Hockenhall Alley, a three-storey house originally forming part of a short terraced row. Built some time around the late 18th century, the house was Grade II listed in December 2008 due to its rarity and retention of some original features, such as narrow timber winder stair and lath and plaster ceilings. The alley was laid out off Dale Street some time between 1765 and 1785, as one of Liverpool's seven medieval streets. The surrounding houses were demolished during the 1880s, following which the house saw use as a pharmacy and clock workshop. Plans were submitted in 2015 to convert a nearby warehouse into a hostel, using number 10 Hockenall Alley as its reception.

=== Back-to-back courts ===
The first back-to-back houses built in Liverpool are believed to be around the 1780s. Typically built with limited space requirements, a typical house measured 10–12 square feet (0.93–1.11 m^{2}) with a cellar, ground floor kitchen and bedrooms above. The size variations can be seen on old maps, such as from the early 20th century, showing back-to-back court houses on Hampton Street next to newer Victorian terraces on Upper Stanhope Street. Early in the Victorian era, the Select Committee on the Health of Towns reported in 1840 that Liverpool's court housing were unventilated, had minimal sanitary provisions and were filthy. Water was from a single communal pipe that could be cut-off if the tenant fell into debt. From 1861, Liverpool banned the construction of back-to-back houses.

The last surviving back-to-back court houses are in Pembroke Place, then known as Watkinson Terrace, with just two surviving houses in a former court of eight, now used as a rear shop extension. Historic maps show how the arrangement used to be, compared to the present day. The houses, coupled with the shops they are attached to, were given listed building status in September 2009. Originally with basements, they were later infilled with interiors described as sparse with little decorative detail and are among the last constructed. The only known surviving example of a back-to-back housing building is Dukes Terrace, constructed in 1843 and abandoned during the 1970s for around 30 years, before being restored in 2003.

== Victorian era ==
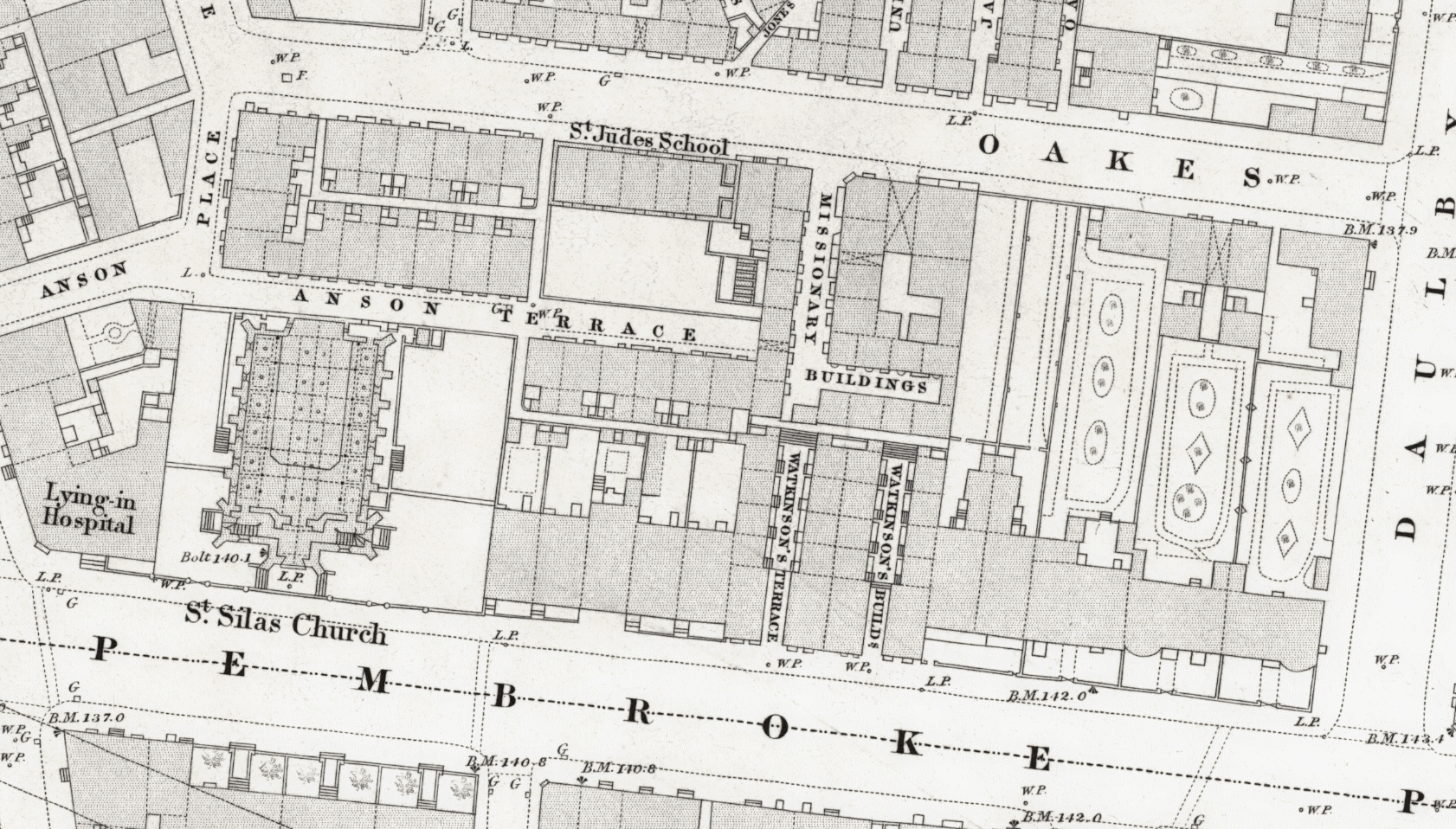
OS first edition map of Pembroke Place, Liverpool in 1850

In the early 1800s, around 40% of the population lived in cellar dwellings, known even at that time to be of poor living quality. Construction of court housing expanded between 1820–1840, responding to the rapid population growth of largely poor and unskilled workers. By 1840, around 86,000 people lived in court housing, believed to be the largest area in England of purpose-built housing for the working-class.

By 1850, there were over 20,000 Welsh builders working in Liverpool who required housing. Land in Toxteth was leased for housing development, with many streets, such as the current day Welsh Streets and Granby Streets, designed by Richard Owens and built by David Roberts, Son and Co. Owens came into contact with Roberts' company around 1867, who were land surveyors and subsequently they became dominant in Liverpool's housebuilding industry. Through his collaboration with David Roberts, Owens designed over 10,000 terraced houses around the city of Liverpool.

By the mid 1800s, many people working in the city were employed on a casual basis with no fixed or guaranteed income, meaning a higher likelihood of experiencing poverty. Liverpool was notorious during this time for squalor and was the first city in the country to build public housing, starting in 1869 with St Martin's Cottages, which were four-storey, self-contained tenements although considered bleak in appearance. The development, which technically breached housing bye-laws, renewed public interest in the problems Liverpool faced with housing, both quantity and quality as well as encouraging councils in other parts of the country to follow a similar example with their own house building schemes. The 1891 census reported that outside of London, Liverpool had the highest number of dwellings and among the highest levels of overcrowding in major cities.

== 20th century ==
=== Inter-war period ===
In 1919, Liverpool contained some of the worst slum housing in the country, with severe overcrowding that meant 11,000 families, representing 6.4% of the population, resided in single-room dwellings. Liverpool had consistently ranked the highest of major cities where families lived in a single room throughout the first 30 years of the 20th century. Housing stock owned by the council was less than 3000 dwellings. During the interwar period between 1919 and 1939, housing construction in Liverpool resulted in over 33,000 council houses being built, accommodating 140,000 local residents, roughly 15% of the total population. The city is recognised as being the first in the country to build council houses following World War I, typically sized between 80–100 square metres (860–1,080 sq ft), although had above national average figures for families living more than 2 people per room, at nearly 1-in-8 in 1921. Many people were not fortunate enough to reside in the new homes and by 1933, around 30,000 people still lived in condemned court and cellar dwellings.

=== Post war housing construction ===
Following World War II, the city saw many prefabricated houses built, intended to house people displaced after bombing destroyed many homes. Construction of prefabricated high-rise flats began during the mid 1950s, particularly as there was a shortage of land available for housing. The first tall high-rise was Logan Towers, built in 1966 in Kirkdale and was the tallest of its kind in the world. The tower block was named after local MP David Logan and was supported by the Logan family, as it meant residents were able to remain close to where their homes had been demolished through slum clearance, as opposed to being resettled further out in areas such as Kirkby.

=== Economic decline ===
Following the slum clearances of the 1950s and 1960s, the succeeding two decades became a period of economic decline, as industries collapsed and public funding was cut. Unemployment in Liverpool was high and people left the city to find work, while remaining residents saw conditions in their housing estates decline through poor management and funding. In 1986, Member of Parliament for Liverpool Riverside Robert Parry asserted that Liverpool's housing expenditure declined in the late 20th century, suggesting every £1 spent in 1979 prior to the Conservatives winning the 1979 general election had fallen to 26p in the pound by 1985. The expenses claim was disputed by Sir George Young, then Parliamentary Under-Secretary of State for the Environment, who declared that government expenditure in Liverpool had risen to just over £1 billion, from £718 million since 1979, although accepted that Liverpool's housing problems were "among the worst in the country". In 1985, Liverpool bid for £132 million (equivalent to £488,536,953 in 2023) to help address its urgent housing problems, yet received just £31 million (equivalent to £114,732,163 in 2023). Liverpool suffered with a large number of vacant properties during the 1980s, with 2,178 houses, representing 3.35% of the total, being vacant in 1984. In 1987, Gerard Gardens was demolished.

An opportunity arose through the Housing Act 1988 which supported the possibility of establishing a Housing action trust for Liverpool that would receive funds directly for housing stock, rather than via the council. A ballot was held in each of the 71 tower blocks, requiring a majority decision to leave control of the council; 67 tower blocks and 83% of the total amount balloted voted to leave council control and in October 1993, the Liverpool Housing Action Trust was founded. A 1996 study concluded that the cost to refurbish the tower blocks would be around £300 million, a decision which was rejected following tenant consultation resulting in 54 blocks being demolished, while 13 were retained and refurbished.

== 21st century ==
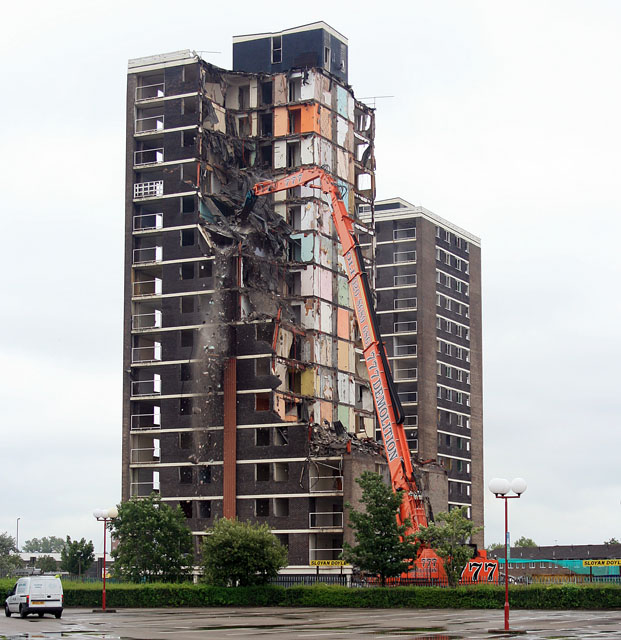
Demolition of high-rise flats in Croxteth, pictured in 2007

After funding was withdrawn from the Housing Market Renewal Initiative following the formation of the coalition government in 2010, demolition and renewal schemes were abandoned, leaving some only partly finished and neighbourhoods half demolished. Houses in some areas, such as the Granby Streets, were acquired by Liverpool City Council and left to fall further into disrepair.

Refurbishment work of numerous derelict structures has occurred since 2010. A derelict army barracks on Everton Road was proposed to be refurbished into office space and residential accommodation of 50 new homes, with the council considering a proposal from One Vision Housing to provide affordable homes for rental and purchase for key workers, army veterans and local people.

In June 2019, it was announced that the council would begin building council houses for the first time in over 30 years, with Mayor of Liverpool Joe Anderson pledging to build 10,000 in total, of which a proportion would include social housing for rent. The council stated they needed to develop 30,000 new houses by 2030.
