= Lake Ontario Waterkeeper =

Canadian environmental advocacy group

Swim Drink Fish Canada
- Formation: 2001; 25 years ago
- Type: Environmental justice advocacy
- Headquarters: Toronto, Ontario, Canada
- Official language: English
- Waterkeeper: Gregary Ford
- Key people: Krystyn Tully, Mark Mattson
- Website: swimdrinkfish.ca

Lake Ontario Waterkeeper (LOW), now known as Swim Drink Fish, is a Toronto-based environmental justice advocacy group founded in 2001, with Lake Ontario, the Great Lakes Basin, and allied waterways at heart. It is a licensed member of the New York–based Waterkeeper Alliance, and a registered Canadian charity. Lake Ontario Waterkeeper was founded by environmental lawyer Mark Mattson, and Krystyn Tully. In November 2017, Lake Ontario Waterkeeper, Fraser Riverkeeper, North Saskatchewan Riverkeeper and its digital platforms were all consolidated under the name “Swim Drink Fish”.

== Actions and initiatives ==
In Summer of 2001 LOW triggered a $250 Million Federal Government remediation plan at Port Granby near Port Hope, Ontario. The dump, was established by Eldorado Mining and Refining Limited (and now managed by Cameco Corp.). In 2005 LOW campaigned the City of Kingston, Ontario to disclose timely data about repeated sewage discharges into Lake Ontario. In 2006 LOW produced "Heart of A Lake" concert tour to several cities in Ontario, Canada blending activism with art. Starting in 2006 LOW started a campaign opposing the burning of tires by Lafarge operations in Bath, Ontario. In 2007 LOW compelled the City of Toronto to disclose specific reasons why beaches are closed, and used the legal system to force the City to take responsibility. Citing a "little-known provincial environmental guideline called F-5 that says municipalities must ensure that beaches are clean enough for swimming 95 per cent of the time." This builds on a 2006 LOW report "Investigating Municipal Beaches: Lessons from Bluffer's Park" which cited some beaches were closed to swimming 42 per cent of the time.

In 2017, Lake Ontario Waterkeeper, Fraser Riverkeeper, and North Saskatchewan Waterkeeper consolidated under a common name, Swim Drink Fish.

== Notable supporters ==
- The Tragically Hip and particularly their frontman Gord Downie
- Edward Burtynsky, photographer
- Sarah Harmer, folk musician
- David Suzuki, Canadian environmentalist and broadcaster.
- Bruce Cockburn, musician
- Chris Brown, musician
- Law Foundation of Ontario
- Jennifer Baichwal, Canadian Documentary Filmmaker

== See also ==
- Great Lakes Areas of Concern
