= Y Ffôr =

Coordinates: 52.925°N 4.385°W

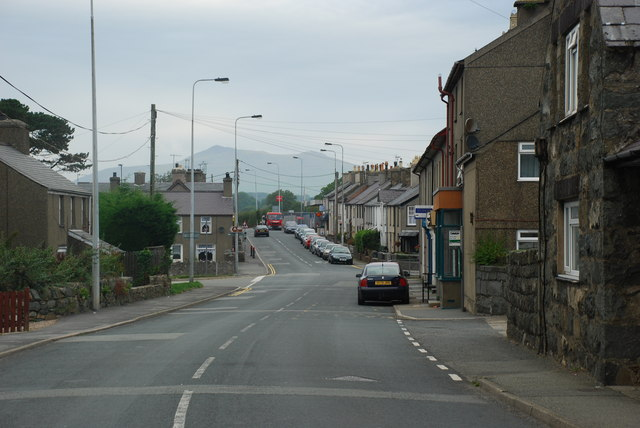
- Y Ffôr

- Location within Gwynedd
- OS grid reference: SH397390
- Community: Llannor
- Principal area: Gwynedd
- Preserved county: Gwynedd
- Shire county: Gwynedd
- Country: Wales
- Sovereign state: United Kingdom
- Post town: PWLLHELI
- Postcode district: LL53
- Dialling code: 01766
- Police: North Wales
- Fire: North Wales
- Ambulance: Welsh
- UK Parliament: Dwyfor Meirionnydd
- Senedd Cymru – Welsh Parliament: Dwyfor Meirionnydd

Y Ffôr is a Welsh village located on the Llŷn Peninsula in the county of Gwynedd.

== History ==
Settlement at Y Ffôr dates back to the Stone Age, but the village itself was established at the beginning of the 19th century. It was originally known as 'Fourcrosses', as it was founded at a crossroads created with the construction of the Porthdinllaen Turnpike trust road (now the B4354), which crossed the road from Pwllheli to Caernarfon (now the A499). The Fourcrosses Inn meant that the village was a stopping point for stage coaches. Fairs were also held in the village square.

== Education ==
The village has a Welsh-medium primary school called Ysgol Bro Plennydd. This was built in 1912, to replace the former school near the Plasgwyn farm. It is named after Henry Jones Williams, a poet from the village who was known as Plennydd.

As of 2023, there were 87 pupils on roll at the school; 84.8 per cent of statutory school age pupils spoke Welsh at home.

== Community ==
Y Ffôr has historically been the home of many poets, and there used to be a literary society in the village run by the poet Plennydd.

== Notable Persons ==
- Richard Owens (1831 – 1891), as an architect, he was responsible for building over 10,000 houses in Liverpool (noticeably the Welsh Streets) and 250 chapels in England and Wales.
