= Granby Four Streets =

Streets in England

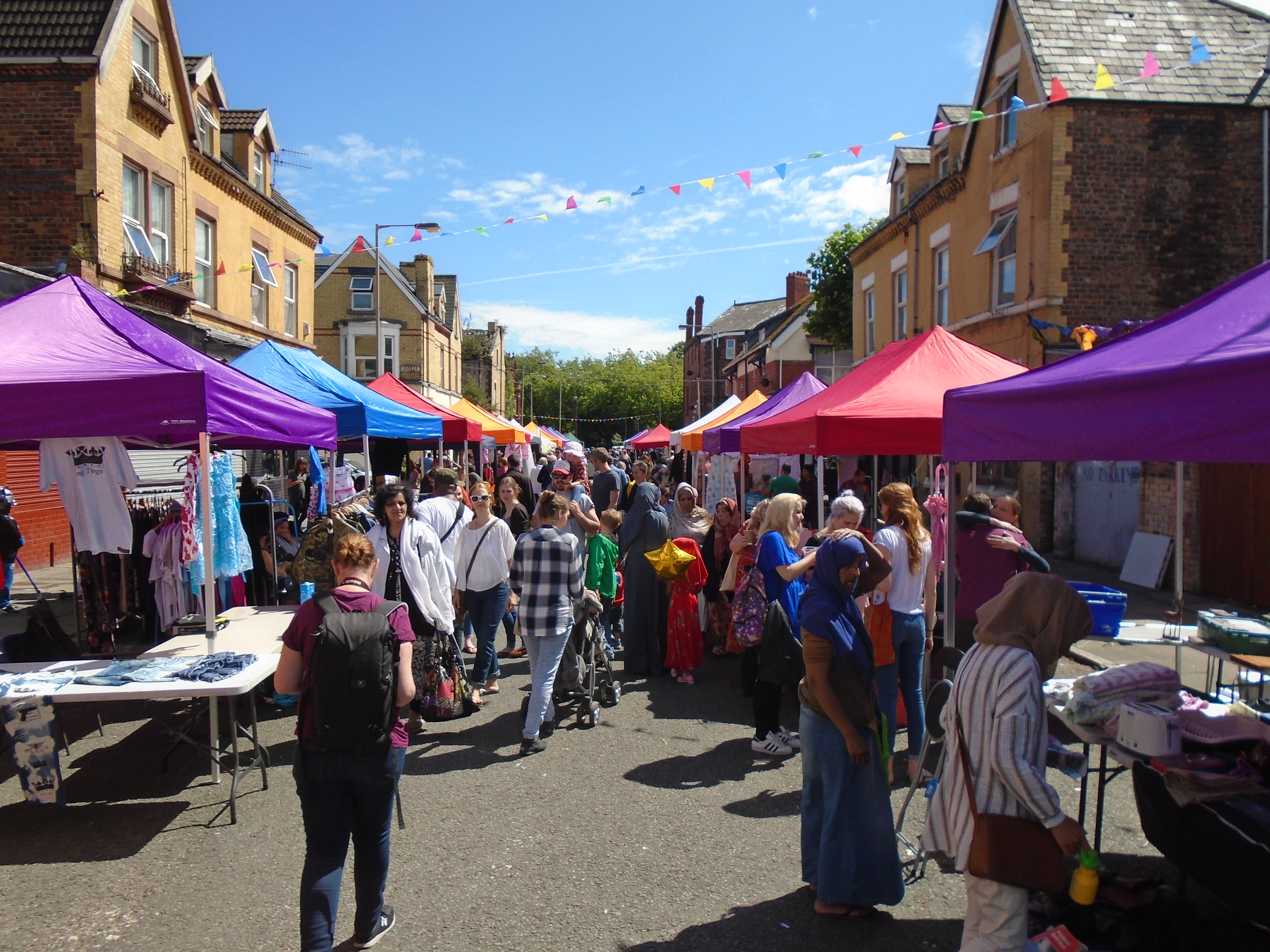
- Granby Market, looking towards Princes Road, July 2017

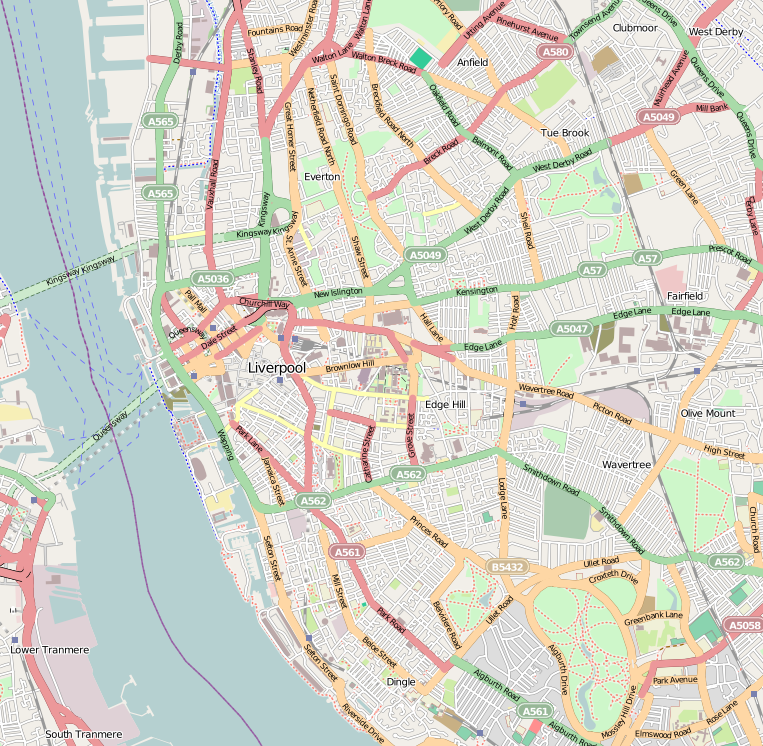
- Location within Liverpool
- Type: Victorian Terraced Streets
- Owner: Private ownership and social landlords
- Area: Toxteth, Liverpool, England
- Postal code: L8
- Coordinates: 53.392049°N 2.956313°W

Construction
- Completed: 1870s

Other
- Designer: Richard Owens
- Website: www.granby4streetsclt.co.uk

The Granby Four Streets is an area in Toxteth, Liverpool, England, comprising four streets at the tip of a triangle near the Grade II* listed Princes Park. The streets, designed by Welsh architect Richard Owens and built by Welsh workers during the late 19th century are Beaconsfield Street, Cairns Street, Jermyn Street and Ducie Street. A fifth street, Granby Street, connects the four streets together and mostly contains commercial units.

The Granby Streets area is among the oldest multicultural neighbourhoods in the country, due to immigration following Britain's post-war period. During the 1960s, the area was designated a "twilight area", resulting in many residents moving out and properties being taken over by landlords with little interest in maintaining the houses. Housing charity Shelter worked in the area during the 1970s, investing money into refurbishing houses in what was one of the earliest examples of community neighbourhood regeneration.

Following the 1981 Toxteth riots, the area entered further decline during the late 20th century which saw many streets abandoned and demolished, except for the southernmost four streets which escaped demolition and have since undergone various regeneration schemes of refurbishment starting from 2011. The streets formed part of an initiative by Liverpool City Council in 2013, who sold some of the derelict houses for £1 each on condition that inhabitants would spend their own money to renovate them to an acceptable habitable condition.

The Granby Four Streets market was established around 2007, featuring street stalls from local residents and people in the wider community, running on a monthly basis. In December 2015, London-based urban designers Assemble, who had worked in the area as designers and architects since 2012, won a £25,000 Turner Prize for their community project artwork in the Granby Four Streets, the first time the award had been won by a group or collective.

The majority of properties on the streets have now been renovated and are inhabited, except for Ducie Street which as of 2022, was subject to a redevelopment proposal including a new build of apartments on vacant land.

== Geography ==
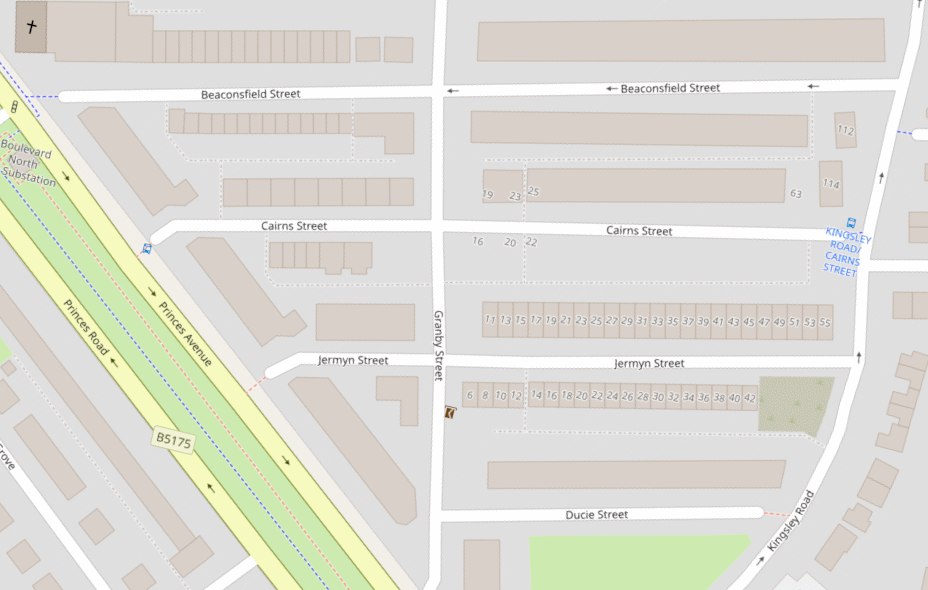
OpenStreetMap showing the Granby Four Streets region

The Granby Four Streets comprise Beaconsfield Street, Cairns Street, Jermyn Street and Ducie Street and are linked via Granby Street. They are situated close to Liverpool City Centre and to the immediate north of the Princes Park, which is less than 15 minutes walking distance to Liverpool Cathedral, clearly visible throughout the area.

Granby Street was constructed as the central commercial high street, with additional living accommodation provided in flats above shops, while retail premises line the street.

== Architecture and layout ==
Built in the 1870s, each street features its own unique architectural design, while sizes vary from two-up two-down houses, to double-fronted homes with between 6 and 8 bedrooms. Beaconsfield Street houses have bay windows with two separate first floor windows, on Cairns Street first floor windows are singular, Jermyn Street houses have pointed door arches and dormer windows and in Ducie Street, houses were built double-fronted with dormer windows on the now demolished south side. Houses within the streets also differ between each other since refurbishment, such as in Cairns Street, where some homes have additional rear rooms or an open plan on the ground floor. Houses in the westernmost part of Beaconsfield Street were built with a mansard roof and dormer window to the front, representing a significant change in the character of such houses since the mid-1860s.

The tree-lined streets are now some of only a few Victorian era survivals within the neighbourhood. When built, Granby Street stretched as far as Upper Parliament Street, with the streets constructed in a uniform arrangement. The majority of properties in Ducie Street, built with a double-fronted facade, had mostly been converted to flats before becoming derelict in the early 2000s.

== History ==
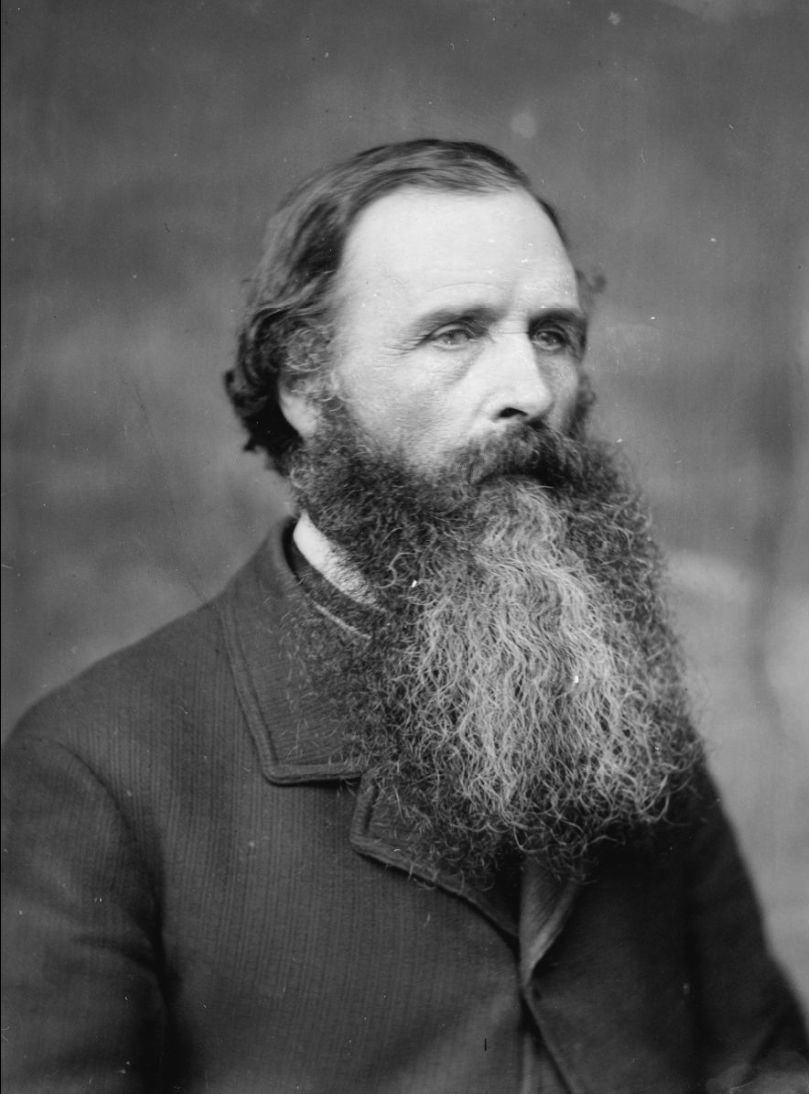
Richard Owens, architect of the housing estate

=== Early history ===
By the 1830s, Welsh migrants were well established within Welsh firms in Liverpool. A map from 1846–1848, prior to the housing estate construction, shows an area clear of any significant dwellings, with a collection of roperies located immediately to the east of what would become the Granby Streets. The houses were constructed in the late 19th century by Welsh builders and designed by Welsh architect Richard Owens, a prolific architect of Liverpool's housing during the era.

=== Post-war multiculturalism ===
After World War II, Toxteth became a popular destination for Commonwealth immigration and the Granby Streets region became one of the country's earliest multicultural neighbourhoods. The Liverpool 8 postcode region and in particular Granby Street became Liverpool's post-war cosmopolitan centre during the 1950s, described at the time as a "buzzing place". During this time, Granby Street was home to around 100 retail outlets which included a wide diversity of shops from a mixture of ethnic races, including a butchers and a cinema while others sold spices and curry ingredients long before they were available in supermarkets. Many of these shops were still run by ethnic minorities into the 21st century. A former resident recalled life as a child growing up around the streets, describing the area during the 1950s–1960s:

"Granby Street was a haven of joviality, music, liveliness, nice people. It was a cosmopolitan area of wonderfulness. There was a community there that was together. It was a meeting place. It seemed to be like the inner core of Liverpool 8: Granby Street."

One particular ethnic group in the area were the Malays, who in 1963 purchased number 7 Jermyn Street as the new home for their social club, following a failure to complete construction of a new nearby mosque due to lack of funds. During the 1970s, the house became the central Malay place in the city, as recalled by a Malay child growing up in a white city, who felt out of place but that the house offered a sense of community.

=== Substandard living conditions ===
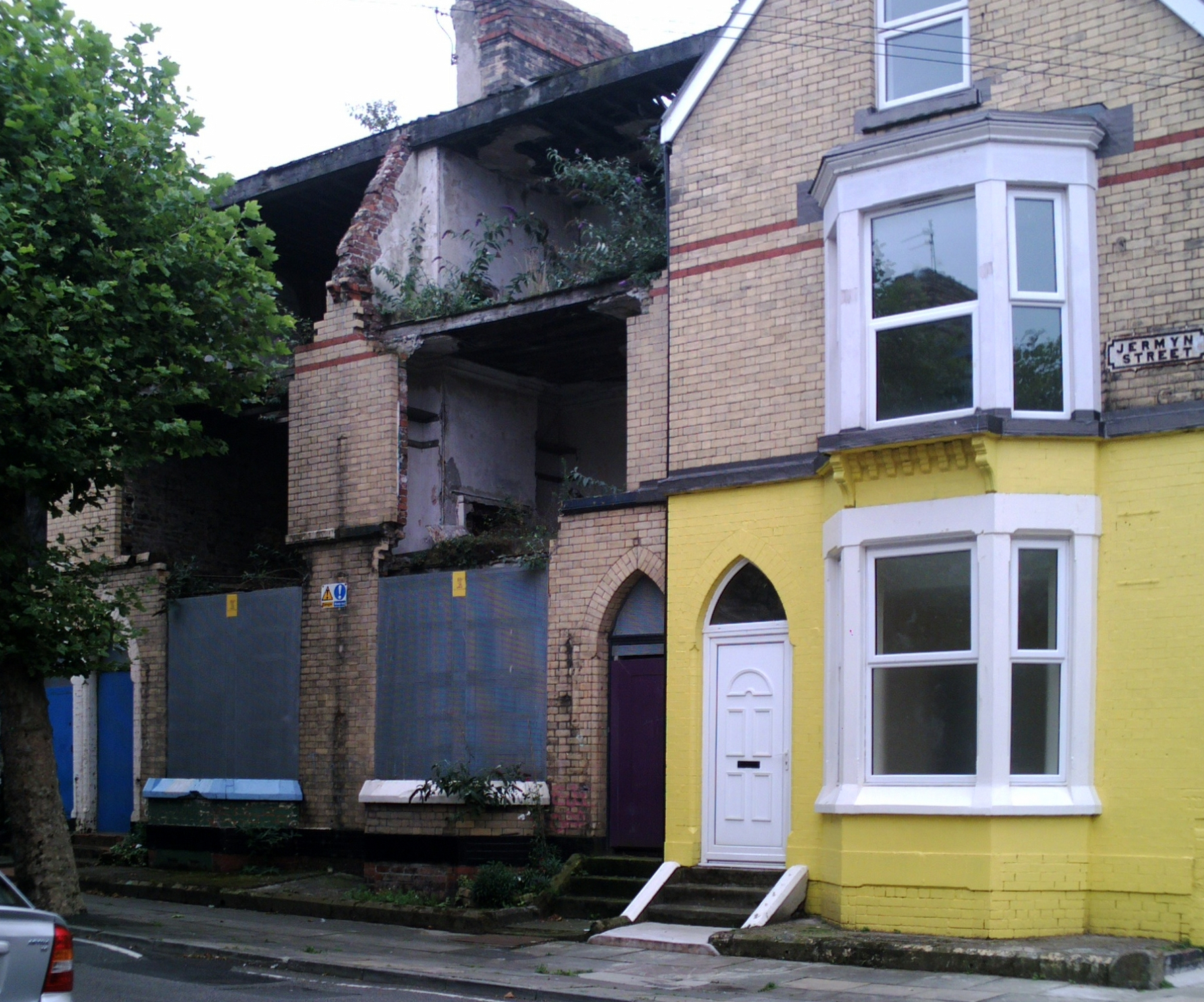
A house in Jermyn Street with frontage collapsed, pictured in August 2012

In the 1960s, Granby was designated as a "twilight area" and many residents who could afford to leave the area did so. Vacant properties were purchased by unscrupulous landlords keen to make quick rental profit. The living quality of many properties was sub–standard, which led to housing charity Shelter Neighbourhood Action Project (SNAP) becoming involved from 1969 until 1972, acquiring many of the poor quality properties and renovating them. In Ducie Street, Shelter reported on the living standards within the homes and found over half were houses in multiple occupation, also stating that residents were keen to see improvements take place in the street. The comedian Ken Dodd, born in Liverpool, opened flats in Ducie Street in April 1970.

A public inquiry in 1972, at the time the first in the country of its kind into an application of compulsory purchase, heard that just ten homes were used to house fifty families; the houses comprised 78 adults and 24 children and nine of them were in multiple occupation. The substandard living conditions and higher risk of infection and health problems resulted in an application by Shelter to compulsory purchase the properties, of which there were around 10 objections to the application. At the start of 1973, an estimated 17,000 people lived in the Granby Ward and called it home, despite many wanting to leave. A team of writers from the Liverpool Echo spent the weekend of 13–14 January in the Granby Ward to report on decaying houses, violence and vandalism in the area. The percentage of dwellings with shared occupation were 34 percent, compared with 3.3 percent nationally while over half the houses were without any hot water, compared with 12.5 percent nationally. Some residents, such as those living in Cawdor Street and Arundel Street, fought to make their homes worthwhile, with the streets described by the Liverpool Echo as "like an oasis in a decaying desert". Following publication of their findings, the Liverpool Echo received many complaints from readers, although noted it had also "received numerous communications" on their reporting of the area applauding their action in highlighting the problems.

=== Charity renewal efforts ===
Shelter received approval from local government to acquire 600 properties and secured a £100,000 grant (equivalent to £1,453,002 in 2025) to invest over three years in the Granby area. The project was one of the earliest examples of a community-based approach to neighbourhood regeneration; after two years, around half of the properties had been successfully rehabilitated, although challenges with securing improvement grants and convincing absentee landlords to improve their properties remained. Throughout much of the 1970s, the area was relatively stable, although an Ordnance Survey map from the late 1970s shows that much of the northern region of the Granby Streets had been demolished and redeveloped into new housing by the end of the 1980s.

=== Decline and dereliction ===
Following the 1981 Toxteth riots, the area entered a period of economic decline, as shops went out of business and houses abandoned as housing associations withdrew from the area. Towards the late 1980s, the area was home to around 40,000 black residents, who were described by Viscount Mersey of Toxteth, in a debate on the inner-cities in the House of Lords, as living in "the worst conditions that I have come across in this country", suggesting also that it was not possible to make a living as a retailer as all the shops were derelict or run–down. Liverpool City Council's regeneration policy became one of demolition of the streets and to start over with a clean slate, a process which took place over decades until just four streets remained. In the mid-2000s, one resident returned home to find both neighbours had left; at its worst, a street of 68 households had only 8 occupied. The area became notorious for fly-tipping, including on routes that local schoolchildren would use to travel to and from school, while the council ceased collecting bins and cleaning the streets. One resident who moved into the streets in 1976 said "people would avoid these streets, they wouldn't walk down them". Boarded up houses had black painted boards, encouraging residents to enhance this by painting curtains on boards, fitting benches and putting out plants.

== Government regeneration ==
By the early 1990s, around 150 of the 200 houses in the Granby Street site were unoccupied. The Granby Residents Association was established in 1993 in an effort to prevent the demolition of what were by then the last four remaining streets. The association lobbied the council throughout the 1990s despite further losses of streets in the surrounding area. In 1994, the Independent newspaper classed Toxteth as "one of the most deprived areas in Britain" as more residents left the area, however the residents' association was successful in preventing the final four streets from being demolished. The Housing Market Renewal Initiative was established in 2002 and identified the four streets as a potential site for new housing, although it was publicly criticised for measures that were perceived as social cleansing by pricing existing residents out of the area.

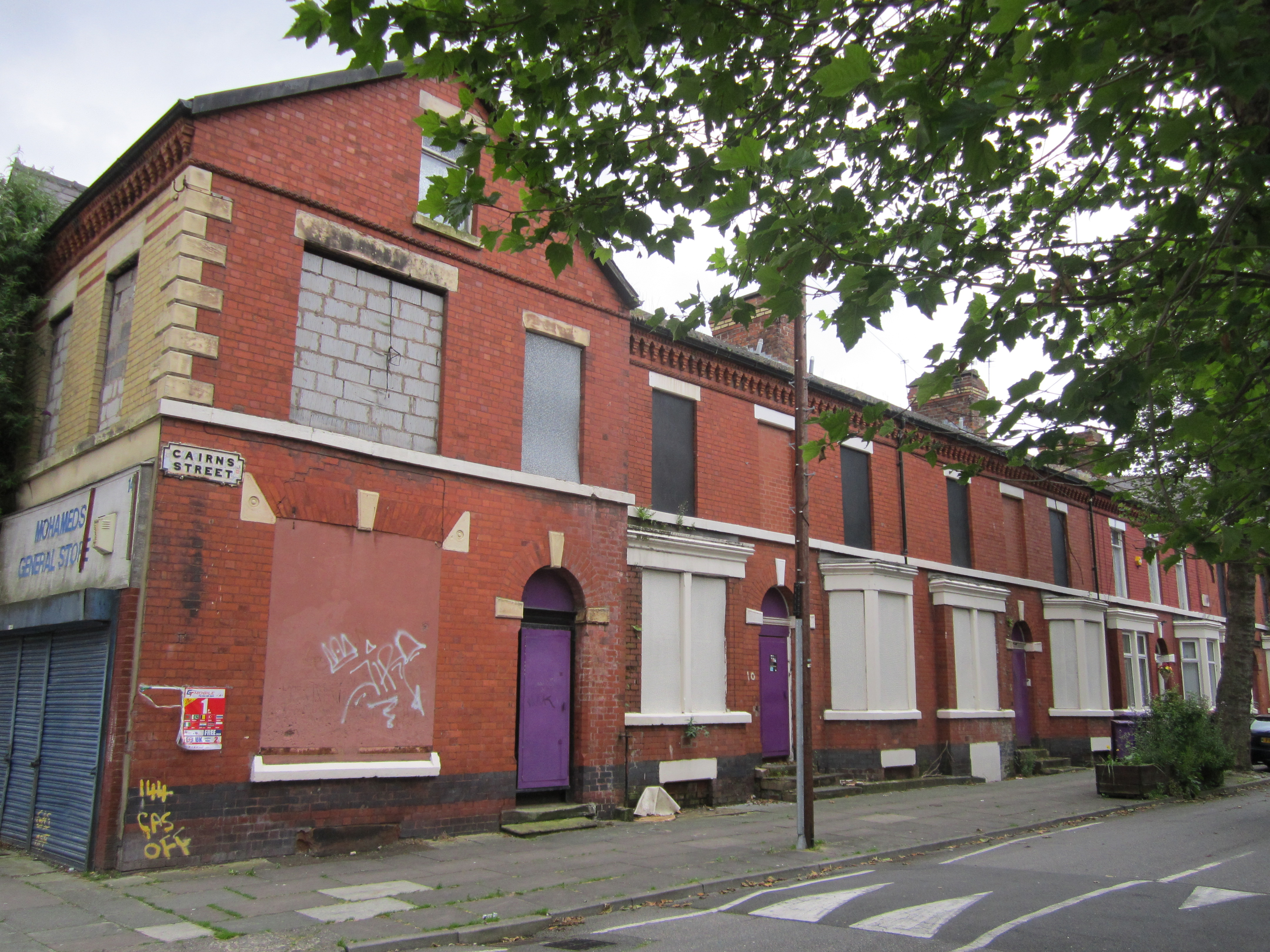
Cairns Street, pictured derelict in 2012

Throughout 2003–2004, the majority of the properties were bought by Liverpool City Council and boarded up, while a smaller number were purchased by the Housing Market Renewal Initiative. English Partnerships funded the council's acquisitions at a cost of £1,020,750 (£9,000 on average per property), although some were not acquired due to higher asking prices as a result of their superior condition. The council appointed Gleeson Group plc as the lead developer for the four streets.

As late as 2010, remaining residents were pressured into selling their homes to the council for just £8,000. Around this time, the residents association group was disbanded, leaving the streets vulnerable to demolition. Following the formation of the coalition government in 2010, schemes funded by the previous government were reviewed and ultimately funding for the Housing Market Renewal Initiative, also known as the pathfinder scheme, was withdrawn with effect from 30 March 2011. The sudden withdrawal of funding left many schemes half–finished and some neighbourhoods only partially demolished, while in others, such as the remaining four streets in the Granby Triangle area, demolition had not begun. Liverpool City Council subsequently acquired many of the houses and left them to fall into further disrepair, with the worst cases seeing frontages collapse.

Liverpool City Council secured a developer in late 2010 to refurbish properties in the remaining streets, at a cost of £2 million jointly funded by the council and the Homes and Communities Agency. Renovation started on Beaconsfield Street in 2012, with the reconstruction of 32 properties involving refurbishment to the facades, new kitchen extensions to the rear and the conversion of attics into additional bedroom space. Further streets formed part of later phases subject to available funds. In November 2011, residents formed a new campaign group titled the Granby Four Streets CLT (Community Land Trust) with its own board of trustees. The trust is not a legal entity in itself, deciding against becoming a charity or a business due to restrictive regulations. Funding was secured from various sources, including a social investor from Jersey keen on funding community groups, as well as from the CLT network and the charitable trust Power to Change. As well as overseeing local artwork and the monthly market, the board also operates as a landlord for various rented properties under their ownership.

== Renewal schemes ==
=== Community regeneration ===
The council launched the "Homes for a Pound" scheme in 2013 in the Granby Four Streets area, which saw over 2,500 applicants apply. The proposal, referred to as the homesteading plan, came after a £25 million agreement with redeveloper LeaderOne collapsed, an arrangement that had planned to redevelop housing in Granby and nearby areas. One of the earliest homes renovated under the £1 homes scheme was in Cairns Street in 2014, when a taxi driver spent over £30,000 refurbishing a four-bedroom, double-fronted property and promised to live in the property for at least the next five years. As of May 2015, just 70 residents lived in an area of 200 homes. By late 2015, 77 properties were under renovation with support from the council and housing associations, while owners of 34 homes were supported in undertaking improvements to the facades of their properties. Additionally, 38 properties were being redeveloped in Cairns Street and Jermyn Street respectively, while 24 homes were being improved by Plus Dane. Councillor Frank Holt, who was a member on the housing committee, said "the area is literally being reborn", thanking partners and the local community for formulating a plan following years of false dawns.

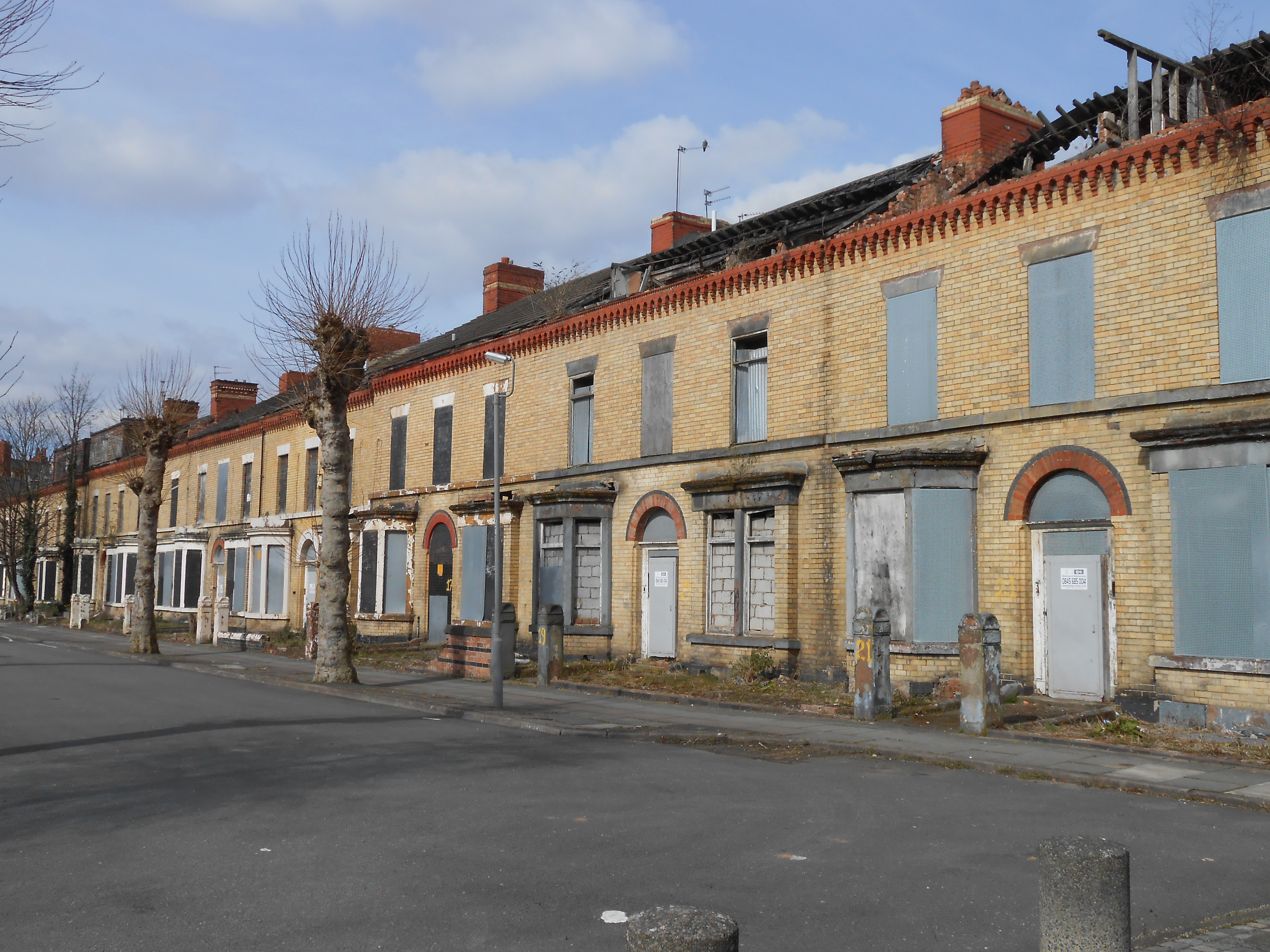
Ducie Street, pictured derelict in 2013

The residents' Community Land Trust purchased 13 properties on Cairns Street for £1 each as part of the council scheme and proceeded to invest hundreds of thousands of pounds to make them habitable. As well as houses, the Granby CLT also took ownership of four derelict shops on the corner of Granby and Cairns Street. Reconstruction and renovation of other properties by residents used low–cost materials and left over waste from demolitions. Various partners have worked on the project, including HMS Housing Solutions, Plus Dane and Liverpool Mutual Homes among others, plus private individuals.

In September 2018, then–Leader of the Opposition Jeremy Corbyn hailed the community as a "blueprint for what the rest of the UK could look like under a Labour Government", praising the success of campaigners and residents in regenerating the streets.

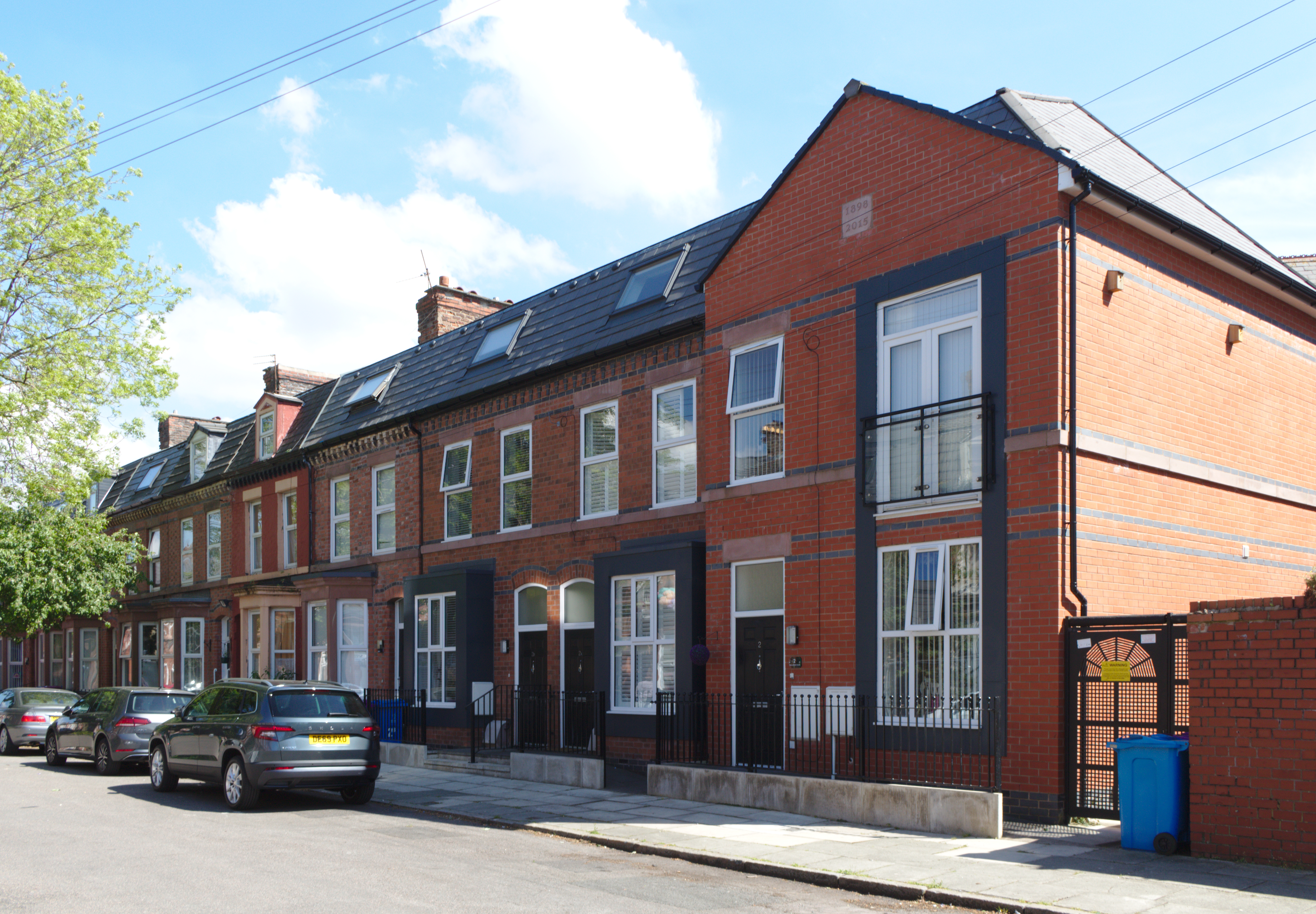
Newly built end-terrace properties on Beaconsfield Street, pictured April 2020

=== New construction ===
Houses in Beaconsfield Street were regenerated in 2013, which also included the construction of four new houses as part of the renewal scheme.

Developer West End Estates submitted an £8 million proposal in 2019 to renovate remaining houses on Ducie Street and construct 45 apartments on the street's vacant side, previously occupied by houses of similar style before demolition in 2009. The proposal, to include building new apartments behind the existing Victorian facades, was met with objections from 8 individuals and resident groups, who expressed concerns that the apartment would not support the aim of allowing families to establish themselves in the community. Residents also thought the proposed design was not in–keeping with existing architecture and were unhappy about the nature of a consultation which only happened following a request from residents.

== Recognition ==
The renewal project to renovate and bring back into use 25 empty properties in Beaconsfield Street won the "Your Move Property Regeneration 2013" award In October 2013, which included recognition for the "innovative design to preserve the character of the homes which were in a very fragile condition". The first new residents moved into the houses in late 2013.

London-based architects Assemble started working in the area around 2012, assuming various roles such as builders, designers and artists. Erika Rushton, Chair of Granby Four Streets Community Land Trust, noted that “Assemble are the only ones who have ever sat and listened to the residents, and then translated their vision into drawings and models, and now into reality." In December 2015, they were the £25,000 winners of the 2015 Turner Prize for their work in the Granby Four Streets region. The announcement was made live on television and the art works include various architectural features (such as fireplaces and stair balustrades). Upon being nominated for the prize, television crews visited the area to report on the work being undertaken. The win was significant as it was the first time a group or collective had ever won the art award, despite Assemble having previously not considered themselves as artists. The community land trust also reached the finals of the World Habitat Awards in 2017, out of 164 applicants.

French writer William Buzy has written about this neighborhood several times, in magazines and in his books.

== Present day ==
As of 2020, the area was busy with construction and refurbishment work taking place in contrast to previous neglect and demolition. Rental of properties is competitively priced, at around half the amount tenants are expected to pay in nearby renovated Welsh Streets.

=== Granby Market ===
The Granby Four Streets Market has been part of the community since around 2007, held on the main Granby Street every first Saturday of the month, featuring pre–owned clothes, art, crafts and paintings. The market was initiated by local residents who tired of living in empty streets and was originally a small table sale in Cairns Street, then inhabited by just 8 households. As of 2018, the market had grown to include up to 70 stalls, bringing together the local community and people from outside the area.

=== Winter Garden ===
In a collaboration between Assemble and the Community Land Trust with capital funding from the Arts Council, two neglected properties in Cairns Street were transformed into an indoor garden and community space, which opened as the Granby Winter Garden in March 2019. The community space houses a communal garden area, as well as space for meetings and events, with hopes of eventually encouraging creative practices among residents. The project also included transformation of the back alley from a rubbish dump, instead being filled with flowers and plants.

== See also ==
- Welsh Streets, Liverpool
