= Port Granby Creek =

Port Granby Creek ruisseau Port Granby
- Location of the mouth of Port Granby Creek in southern Ontario
- Etymology: Named for Port Granby

Location
- Country: Canada
- Province: Ontario
- Regional Municipality: Durham
- Municipality: Clarington

Physical characteristics
- Source: Confluence of two unnamed streams
  - coordinates: 43°56′22″N 78°27′27″W
  - elevation: 126
- Mouth: Lake Ontario
  - location: Port Granby
  - coordinates: 43°54′13″N 78°27′33″W
  - elevation: 74.1 m (243 ft)

Basin features
- Progression: Lake Ontario→ Saint Lawrence River→ Gulf of Saint Lawrence
- River system: Lake Ontario drainage basin

Port Granby Creek (French: ruisseau Port Granby) is a stream in the municipality of Clarington, Regional Municipality of Durham in Ontario, Canada. It feeds into Lake Ontario, which it reaches at the community of Port Granby, after which it is named.

== Course ==
Port Granby Creek begins at the confluence of two unnamed streams at an elevation of 126 metres (413 ft) southeast of the community of Newtonville. It heads southwest, passes under Ontario Highway 401, and turns south. The creek flows under the Canadian Pacific Railway and Canadian National Railway main lines and reaches its mouth at Lake Ontario at the community of Port Granby. Lake Ontario flows via the Saint Lawrence River to the Gulf of Saint Lawrence.
