= Port Granby, Ontario =

Port Granby
- Dispersed rural community
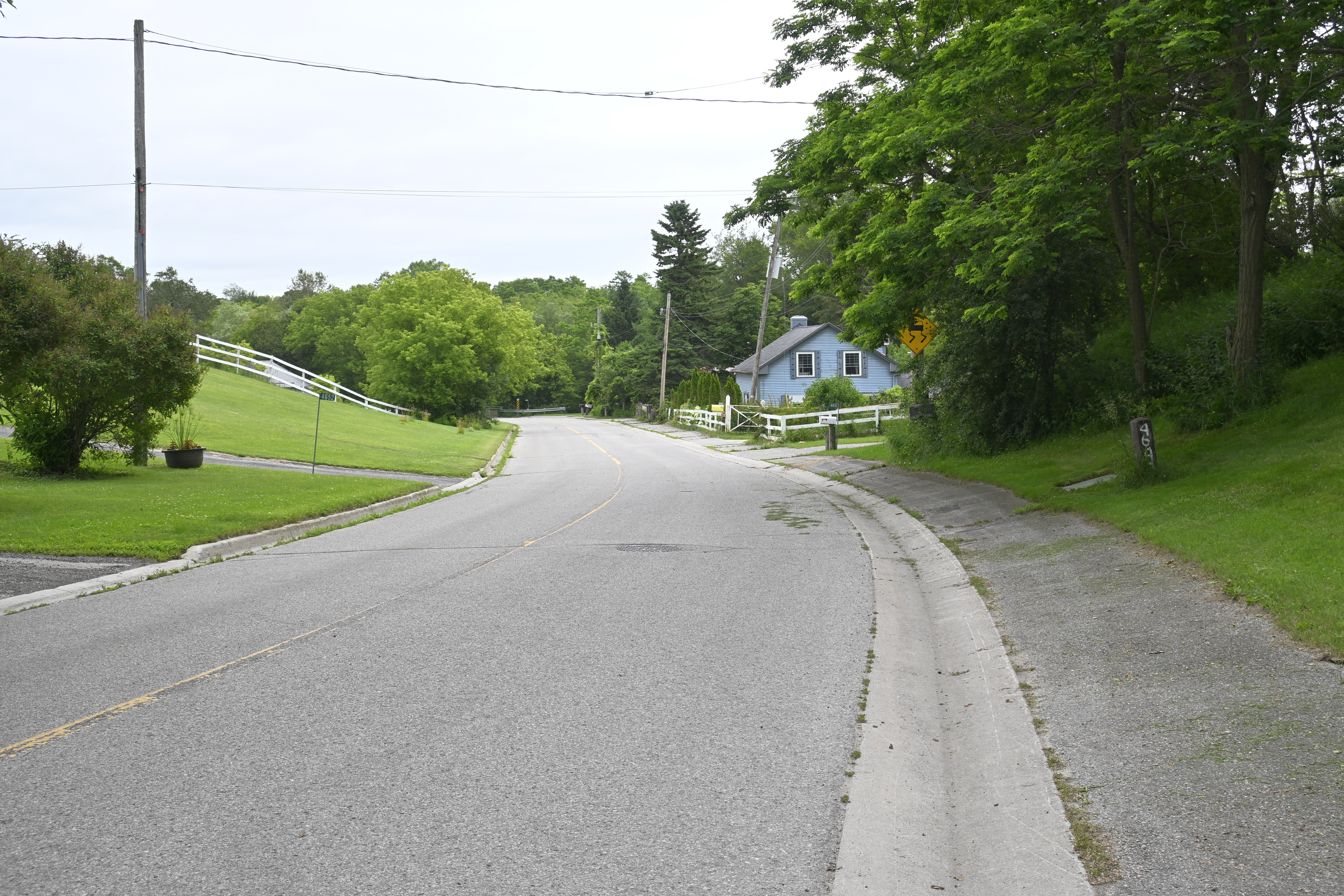
- Lakeshore Road in Port Granby

- Location in southern Ontario
- Coordinates: 43°54′17″N 78°28′00″W
- Country: Canada
- Province: Ontario
- Regional Municipality: Durham
- Municipality: Clarington
- Settled: Summer 1796
- First mentioned: 1841
- Present name: 1848
- Elevation: 106 m (348 ft)
- Time zone: UTC-5 (Eastern Time Zone)
  - Summer (DST): UTC-4 (Eastern Time Zone)
- Area codes: 905, 289, 365

Port Granby is a dispersed rural community in the municipality of Clarington, Regional Municipality of Durham in Ontario, Canada. The community is on Lake Ontario at the mouth of Port Granby Creek, and lies at an elevation of 106 metres (348 ft).

== History ==
The area was first settled in the summer of 1796, and Danforth's Road — from Toronto to the mouth of the Trent River, later extended via Prince Edward County to connect onward to Kingston — was completed through the area by Asa Danforth Jr. by 1799, but that route was superseded by Kingston Road further north, away from the Port Granby area, in 1817. The community is first mentioned as the Village of Granby in 1841. A request to incorporate the Granby Harbor Company was made in 1846, and the community was officially named Port Granby in 1848. Grain and timber were the principal goods shipped from the port through the 19th century, but the village had mostly disappeared by the 1920s, with only a few homes and a post office remaining in 1936.
