= Richard Owens (architect) =

Welsh architect (1831–1891)

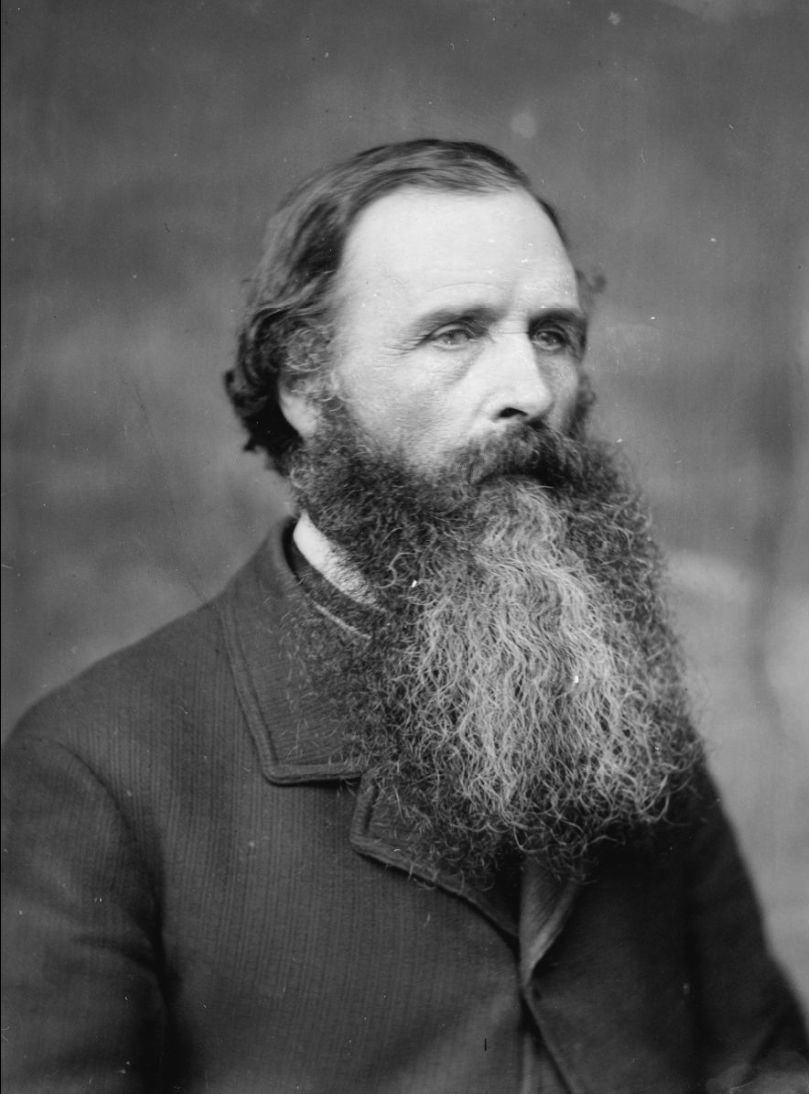
- Born: 1831; Y Ffôr, Wales
- Died: 24 December 1891 (aged 59–60)
- Known for: Architecture
- Notable work: Welsh Streets, Liverpool

Richard Owens (1831 – 24 December 1891) was a Welsh architect, working mostly on urban housing in Liverpool, England and on the construction of chapels in Wales.

== Background ==
Owens was born at Plas Bell, in Y Ffôr, the eldest son of Griffith Owens, a carpenter.

After a period of primary education, he learned the carpenter's craft with his father and at the age of twenty, he went to Liverpool to work as a clerk and then as foreman to John Jones, a builder, in Everton. John Jones emigrated to the United States of America and Owens moved to Williams & Jones, Castle Street, Liverpool to a company that bought rural land around the old town of Liverpool to sell for housing developers. His main duties for Williams and Jones were to measure land and design plans.

While working during the day, Owens also attended evening classes at the Institute of Engineering to learn more about architecture and design.

== Career ==
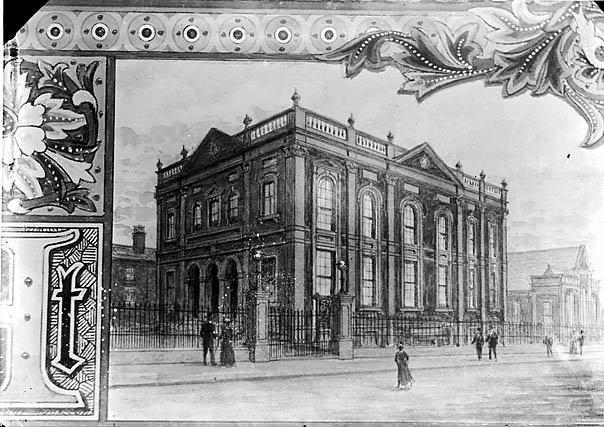
Fitzclarence Street chapel

Owens began working as a freelance architect in 1862, among his first contracts being the building of a new place of worship for the Welsh Calvinistic Methodist congregation of Rose Place, Fitzclarence Street in Liverpool, where he was a member and which was the most expensive Welsh chapel (of similar historical value) to be built in the history of Welsh Nonconformity. He subsequently designed over 250 other chapels for Welsh nonconformists, of all denominations, throughout England and Wales, including the Baker Street chapels for the Congregationalists and the Calvinistic Methodist Tabernacle in Aberystwyth. (Note: As an example of Owens' industry, he designed four chapels, for four different denominations, in Aberystwyth alone: the English Baptist Chapel, the English Presbyterian Church, the Seion Independent Chapel and the Tabernacle Calvinistic Methodist Chapel.)

While working on the design of Mynydd Seion chapel, Abergele in 1867, he came into contact with David Roberts & Co Company, Liverpool. The company were land surveyors and became dominant in Liverpool's housebuilding industry. Through his collaboration with David Roberts, Owens designed over 10,000 terraced houses in the city of Liverpool, particularly those in the Toxteth area now commonly known as the Welsh Streets, as many of the streets were named after Welsh towns and villages such as Voelas Street, Rhiwlas Street and Powis Street. Ringo Starr was born in one of the Welsh Streets, in 9 Madryn Street and attended school in Pengwern Street. Owens also designed Roberts' corporate headquarters, Westminster Buildings, on Dale Street in the city.

Owens was one of the most prolific architects of chapels in Wales (Note: As well as working for congregations of different faiths, Owens undertook work in a range of architectural styles; in Caernarfon, his Engedi Calvinistic Methodist Chapel on New Street is Italianate while his English Presbyterian Church in Castle Square is "uncompromisingly Gothic".) and terraced houses in Liverpool. According to Dan Cruickshank, the historian, "Owens was so successful he could be responsible for (planning) more terraced houses in Victorian Britain than anyone else".

== Personal ==
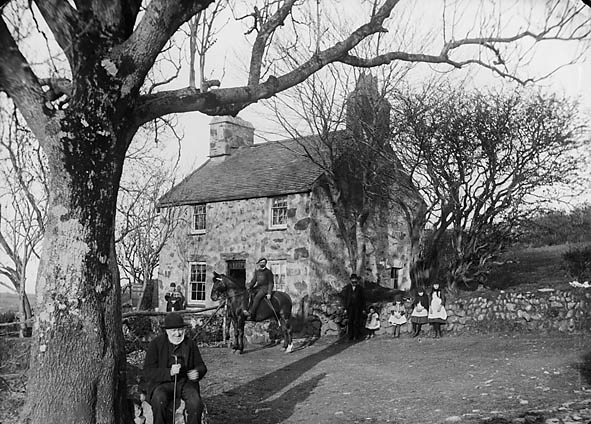
Plas Bell, Y Ffôr, Pwllheli – early home of Richard Owens

In 1858, Owens married Margaret Roberts, daughter of Hugh Roberts in Llanfairfechan and together they had 5 daughters and one son. Owens was known for a "somewhat abrasive" personality; visiting the site of his Presbyterian church in Caernarfon he was so annoyed at what he considered sub-standard workmanship on the entrance gates that he ordered them to be pulled down, describing them in a letter to the foundry master as "most slovenly done throughout" and described them as the worst specimen "of all the iron works that I ever had".

He died at his home, 'Rhianfa' in Anfield Road, Liverpool at the age of 60 from gallstones and he was buried in Anfield Cemetery.

== Sources ==
- Haslam, Richard; Orbach, Julian; Voelcker, Adam (2009). Gwynedd. The Buildings of Wales. New Haven, US and London: Yale University Press. ISBN 978-0-300-14169-6. OCLC 552084869.
- Lloyd, Thomas; Orbach, Julian; Scourfield, Robert (2006). Carmarthenshire and Ceredigion. The Buildings of Wales. New Haven, US and London: Yale University Press. ISBN 978-0-300-10179-9.
- Sharples, Joseph (2004). Liverpool. Pevsner Architectural Guides. New Haven, US and London: Yale University Press. ISBN 978-0-300-10258-1. OCLC 636583587.
