= Housing Market Renewal Initiative =

British housing redevelopment scheme

The Housing Market Renewal Initiative (HMRI) or Housing Market Renewal (HMR) Pathfinders programme was a controversial scheme of demolition, refurbishment and new-building which ran in the UK between 2002 and 2011 and aimed "to renew failing housing markets in nine designated areas of the North and Midlands of England."

== Housing Market Renewal Pathfinders ==
The programme was launched in 2002 by deputy prime minister John Prescott, with the coalition government led by David Cameron ending funding in March 2011.

Supporters of the scheme claimed that it would " renew failing housing markets and reconnect them to regional markets", "improve neighbourhoods and" "encourage people to live and work in these areas."

Opponents claimed that "Britain's heritage is being 'rapidly lost' by botched renovation and unnecessary demolition - in particular the bulldozing of Victorian terraced housing across the north west of England." and that it was "a programme of class cleansing".

The nine Pathfinder partnerships announced in April 2002 were Birmingham/Sandwell, East Lancashire, Hull and East Riding, Manchester/Salford, Merseyside, Newcastle/Gateshead, North Staffordshire, Oldham/Rochdale, and South Yorkshire.

In 2005, three further areas of low demand were also identified; West Yorkshire, West Cumbria, and Tees Valley.

== History ==
HMRI was started in 2002, from the Office of the Deputy Prime Minister (ODPM), at the time responsible for the Department for Communities and Local Government. The Labour Government had adopted as one of its policies the improvement of urban areas that had suffered numerous social problems, originating from decline of traditional industries in the North of England, like the closure of coal mines, ship yards, textile industry. Rapidly rising house prices throughout the United Kingdom between 1995 and 2007 creating a wealth effect had not been replicated in such areas. Instead, such areas experienced, according to an early independent study of Pathfinder, "high vacancy rates, increasing population turnover, low sales values and, in some cases, neighbourhood abandonment and market failure".

The basis was a report by the Centre for Urban and Regional Studies (CURS) at the University of Birmingham, which informed lobbying by the National Housing Federation of the Government's 2002 Comprehensive Spending Review.

From the beginning on there was criticism of HMRI, from residents of the affected areas, politicians as well as experts in the field of historic buildings. Save Britain's Heritage have published an analysis of the pathfinder scheme that is highly critical of the proposals. Some local resident organisations opposed the plans for their areas, such as:

- Welsh Streets Home Group
- Granby Residents Association

while other residents groups have supported the policy and participated in its delivery.

Property Scandal, a Channel 4 TV series and campaign, has been highly critical of Pathfinder schemes, broadcasting interviews with a central government housing minister - who appointed the presenter an independent advisor - and attempted interviews with Sefton Council and the Mayor of Liverpool, who both responded with written statements or brush-offs. Part of the film shows an 82-year-old being forcefully evicted from her freehold house after a compulsory purchase order.

The Joseph Rowntree Foundation, a poverty charity, reported at an early stage that (while remaining generally supportive of the scheme), it was necessary for its success that financial, legal and moral commitments made up to a decade in advance should be supported by UK Central Government long-term funding commitments to 2019. As of June 2008, however, Central Government funding had been committed only to March 2011, and Parliamentary concerns were expressed "that demolition sites, rather than newly built houses, will be the Programme’s legacy".

== Merseyside (Liverpool, Sefton, Wirral) ==
The Merseyside Pathfinder area is also known as NewHeartlands. The area was broken up into geographical parts: Dingle, Granby, Arundel, Picton, Abercromby, Smithdown, Kensington, Tuebrook, Everton, Breckfield, Anfield, Vauxhall, Melrose and County.

=== Granby ===
The area of Toxteth is located close to the historic Princes Park. The streets include Beaconsfield Street, Cairns Street, Ducie Street, Jermyn Street and Granby Street. These streets are bound to the west by Princes Avenue with large, representative Victorian Houses, to the east by Kingsley Road and to the north by Eversley Street. Other streets in the area have been demolished and rebuilt and are not included in the renewal area. The local authority also refers to their plans as the '4 streets project', reflecting the fact that 4 streets are covered: Beaconsfield Street, Cairns Street, Jermyn Street and Ducie Street. All these streets cross or lead off Granby Street.

== See also ==
- Neighbourhood Management Pathfinder Programme
