= Welsh Streets, Liverpool =

Streets in England

Welsh Streets
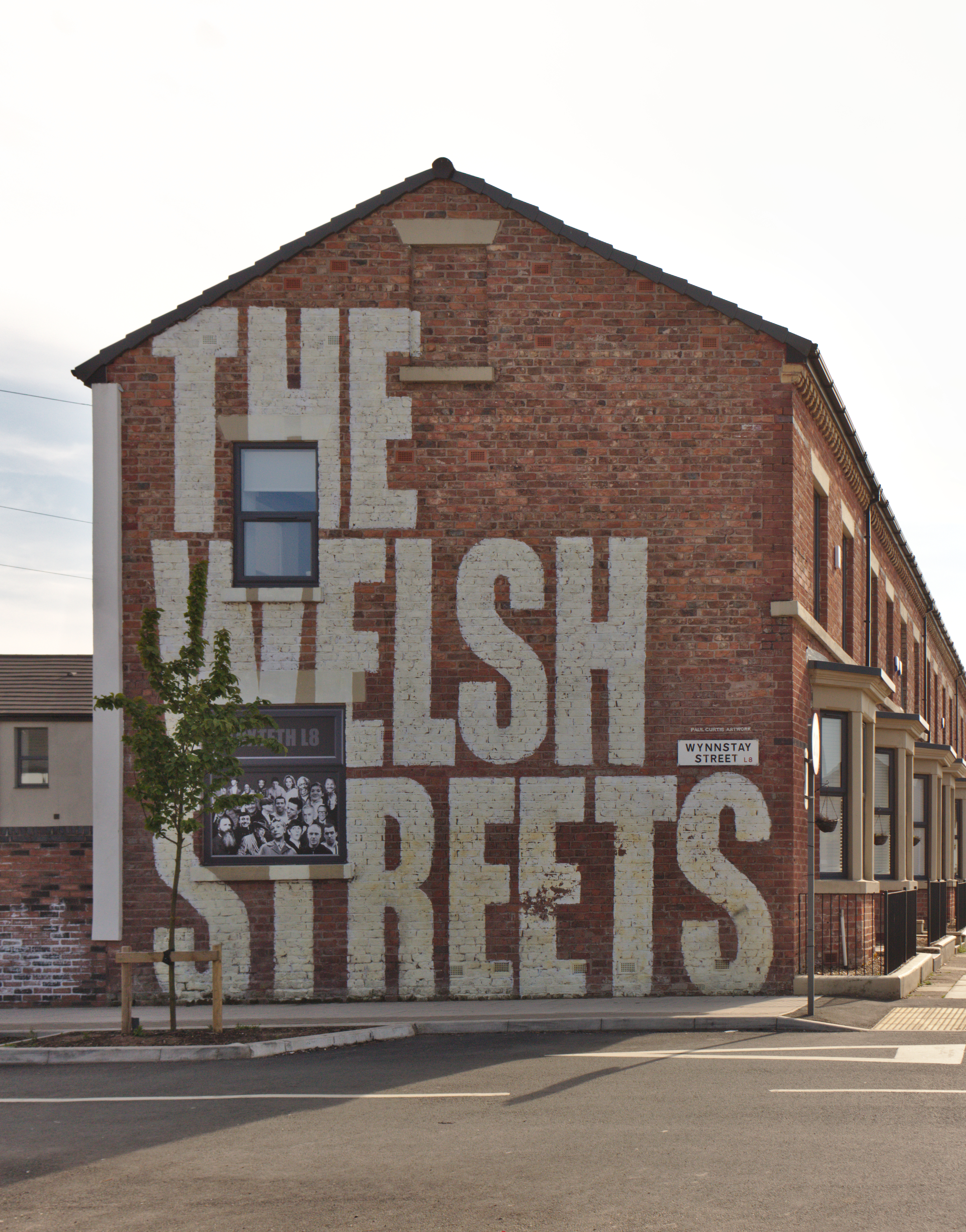

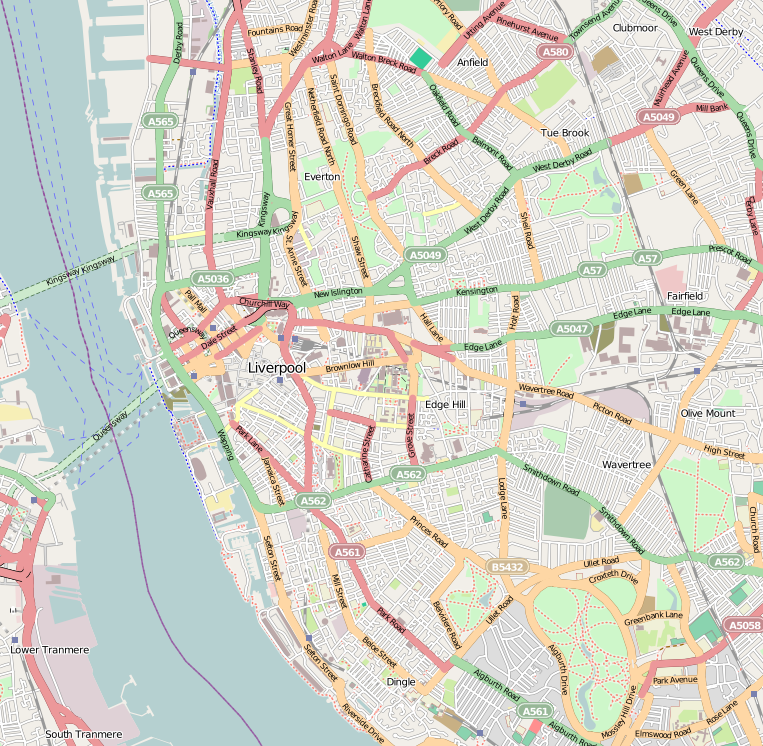
- Location within Liverpool
- Type: Victorian terraced houses
- Owner: Placefirst NorthWest
- Area: Toxteth, Liverpool, England
- Postal code: L8
- Coordinates: 53°23′19″N 02°57′35″W

Construction
- Completed: 1880s

Other
- Designer: Richard Owens
- Known for: Birthplace of Ringo Starr (9 Madryn Street)
- Status: Refurbished
- Website: welshstreets.co.uk

The Welsh Streets are a group of late 19th century Victorian terraced streets in Toxteth, Liverpool, England. The houses were designed by Welsh architect Richard Owens and built by Welsh workers to house workers mainly involved in the industries on the docks; the streets were named after Welsh villages and landmarks.

The Beatles drummer Ringo Starr was born in Madryn Street in 1940. Although several of the original houses were lost in World War II bombing, most of the terraced properties in the original street configuration remain standing some 150 years after being built.

Following a period of decline in the late 20th century, plans were announced in the early 2000s as part of the Housing Market Renewal Initiative programme to demolish the estate and build new, but fewer, houses in their place. Despite the area being cleared of residents and houses prepared for demolition at a cost to Liverpool City Council of nearly £22 million, funding for the planned redevelopment was withdrawn in 2011 following the change in government and spending cuts, and the demolition did not take place.

Subsequent revised demolition and renewal proposals by the council and housing group Plus Dane were rejected by the government due to concerns about the negative impact they would have on the city's cultural heritage. Instead, a housing renewal company took ownership of some of the properties, initially in a pilot scheme, to extensively renovate them and make them available for rent. The first new tenants moved into Voelas Street around September 2017. Placefirst, the company renovating the properties, won an award in November 2018 for the standard of the refurbishments.

== Geography ==
The streets include Wynnstay Street, Voelas Street, Rhiwlas Street, Powis Street, Madryn Street, Kinmel Street, Gwydir Street, Pengwern Street and Treborth Street. Other streets in the vicinity, such as Vronhill Street and Pimhill Street were built on the west side of High Park Street as shown on maps from the early 20th century, although have since been lost through regeneration of newer housing. The moniker Welsh Streets is given as they were constructed by Welsh builders for Welsh migrants seeking work and housing in Liverpool and named after Welsh towns, valleys and villages. When constructed, the street widths were generous, allowing for trees to be planted in the early 20th century which were well-spaced and did not intrude upon the housing.

The streets are close to Liverpool City Centre and within 15 minutes' walking distance to Liverpool Cathedral, which is clearly visible throughout the area. Situated right next to the streets is Princes Park, designed and laid out by Joseph Paxton in 1840, an architect and later Member of Parliament for Coventry. Median house prices in the area are below the average prices for the wider Liverpool area and nearly 90% of properties fall within Council Tax Band A, the lowest band. The area falls within the Princes Park ward for local councillors.

== History ==
=== Early history ===
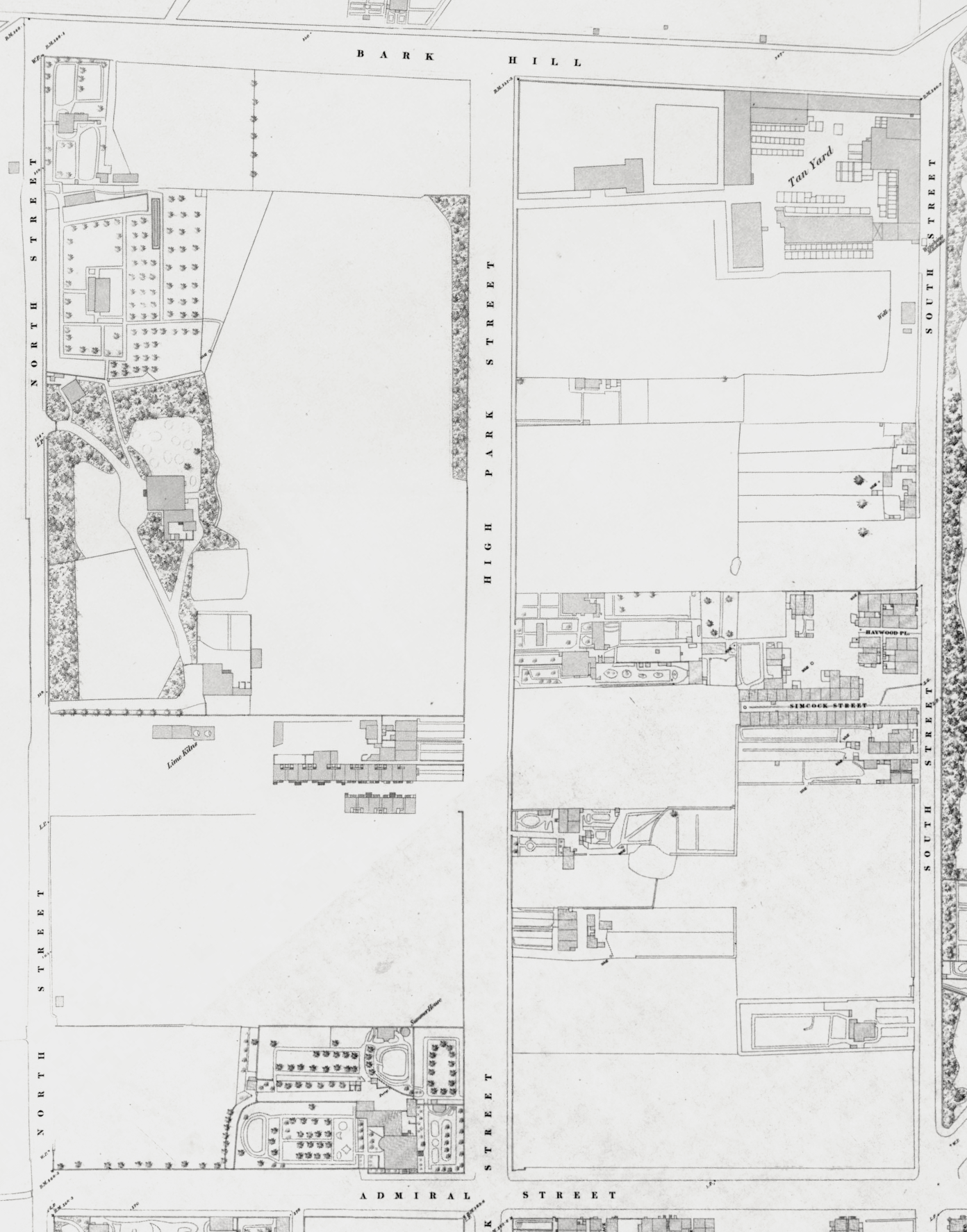
Map from 1847 of Liverpool's Welsh Streets region

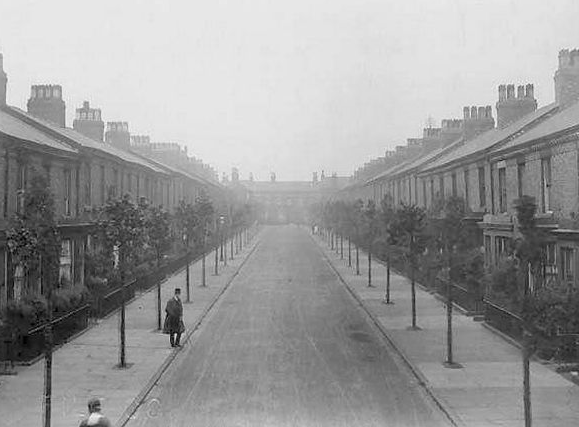
Voelas Street, Liverpool c1911

By the 1830s, Welsh migrants were well established within Welsh firms in Liverpool. Maps from 1846 show that South Street, the road which runs the length of the Welsh Streets, served as a rear access lane. A map from 1847, prior to the housing estate construction, shows an area clear of any significant dwellings, with a tanyard located in what would become Wynnstay Street. A street of dwellings named Simcock Street was located close to the present-day Kinmel Street.

By 1850, there were over 20,000 Welsh builders working in Liverpool who required housing. Land in Toxteth was leased for housing development, with the streets designed by Richard Owens and built by David Roberts, Son and Co. Owens, while working on the design of Mynydd Seion chapel in Abergele in 1867, forged a professional relationship with Roberts' company, who were land surveyors and eventually became dominant in Liverpool's housebuilding industry. This collaboration resulted in the design of over 10,000 terraced houses in Liverpool, particularly those in the surrounding Toxteth area where the Welsh Streets are located. The Welsh Streets estate was to be their third construction project, planned to comprise 1,776 houses in a hierarchical design, with the most desirable three-storey properties in Kelvin Grove being located closer to Princes Road to the north. Houses in the next three streets south from Kelvin Grove were built with bay windows, while the remainder had this omitted. Construction was concluded some time around 1882.

In the latter part of the 19th century, just under a third of the city's population of 450,000 were Irish-born men, slightly outnumbering the 80,000 Welsh migrants drawn by promises of employment. Welsh migrants made significant contributions to the urban development of Victorian Liverpool.

=== Later history ===
The terraced houses have outlasted many later housing developments, such as towers and tenements. Some properties were lost during World War II bombing, but by the 1950s, maps indicated that they had been replaced with typical post-war housing on streets including Kelvin Grove, Wynnstay Street and Madryn Street.

During the early 1970s, the Welsh Streets Residents' Association formed as part of a campaign seeking an "improvement area" designation to prevent potential dereliction due to blight and neglect. During a public meeting in September 1973, a motion for the designation garnered support from 60 tenants, leading to a survey of all 780 homes. By November of the following year, over 50 residents marched with a petition signed by 200 people to the Lord Mayor of Liverpool, opposing proposed demolitions. The residents advocated for modernisation, expressing concerns that landlords had ceased maintenance in anticipation of demolition.

In November 1978, Liverpool City Council decided that numerous areas would be declared "Housing Action Areas", including part of the Welsh Streets region. Compulsory purchase orders followed over the next few years of many houses in the area. Notices of compulsory purchase for parts of Wynnstay Street, Voelas Street and Rhiwlas Street started to appear from the end of the 1970s, which had been designated as clearance areas comprising houses noted as being "unfit for human habitation". A map from the 1970s showed partial demolition and redevelopment had already started on the opposite side of the Welsh Streets, specifically in Jolliffe Street and Foxhill Street, with those streets and others to the south disappearing from maps by the end of the 1980s. Compulsory purchases continued throughout the 1980s.

Around half of the houses originally constructed by Richard Owens around Liverpool had already been lost by the early 21st century. In 2006, the then Leader of the Opposition David Cameron visited the streets with Michael Heseltine and said he was baffled by the proposed clearance plans. The area experienced decline during the latter part of the 20th century with the gradual abandonment of properties, though many houses were still inhabited until early 2007.

== Decline and Pathfinder renewal ==
In the early 2000s, the Housing Market Renewal Initiative was initiated, with the goal of rejuvenating housing stock nationwide and bolster property values in perceived areas of deprivation. The Welsh Streets became part of this renewal programme. A 2003 survey determined a significant level of satisfaction among residents, with 72% expressing satisfaction with their homes and over half approving of the housing quality in the area. Only 1% of those surveyed believed that demolishing the existing structures would contribute to the neighborhood's improvement. The renewal programme's proposals were to demolish 500 Victorian terraced houses and replace with 370 new build houses, with a smaller scale refurbishment elsewhere. When the plans were submitted, over half of the properties were under social landlord control. The basis of the demolition plans was the perceived potential of the cleared land as an attractive development site.

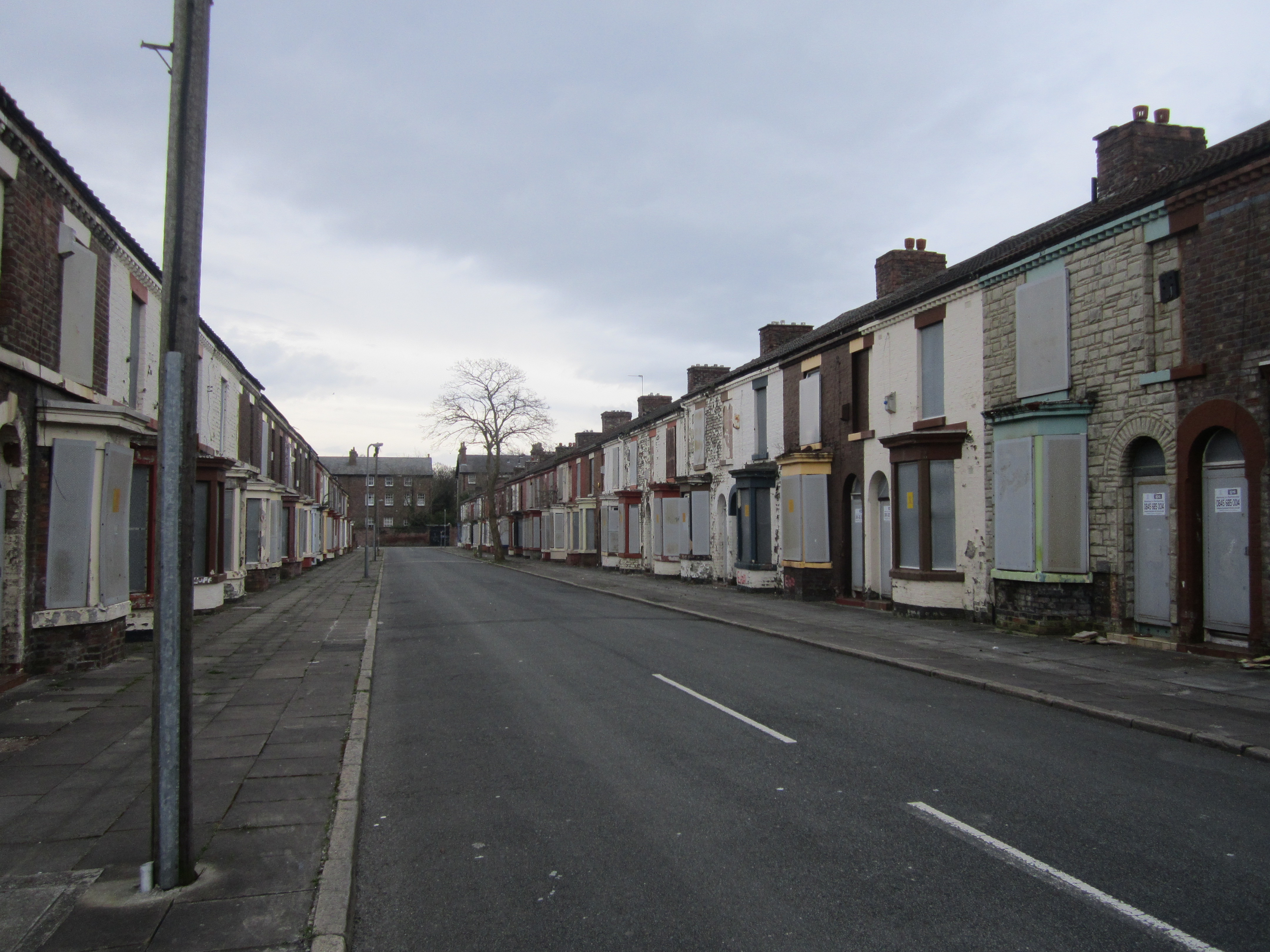
Rhiwlas Street in an empty and derelict condition, April 2013

Council survey data published in 2005 showed the Welsh Streets were broadly popular with residents and in better than average condition, but the council nevertheless recommended demolition because of a perceived over-supply of obsolete terraced houses in Liverpool. When residents were consulted over the clearance plans in 2005, a 58% majority favoured retaining the houses over demolition. In Madryn Street alone, residents voted 33-1 against demolition plans.

The land was offered to private developer Gleeson Group plc and social landlord Plus Dane, with proposals published for lower density houses. Some residents were happy to be offered new homes, while others were determined to stay, dividing the local community. Some residents who were keen on staying expressed concern that the planned new housing would cost around double (£120,000) what they were being offered for their home (£62,000), with mortgages unlikely to be offered to older residents. The Neighbourhood Renewal Assessment in 2005 stated that the environment around the Welsh Streets was bleak and that effective redevelopment following a clearance would significantly contribute towards regenerating the area. Much of a property's value came from investors who acquired the properties during Liverpool's European Capital of Culture period in the hope they could profit from reselling to the local authority. The majority of houses in the streets transferred ownership to the Housing Market Renewal Initiative, predominantly throughout 2005 to 2008.

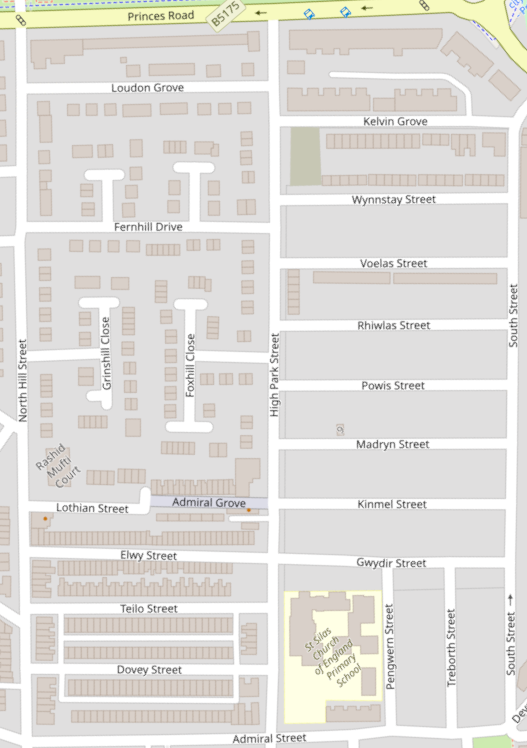
OpenStreetMap of the Welsh Streets region

By 2009, over 100 residents had been rehoused together into a neighbourhood nearby which they had helped to design, whilst others had left the area altogether. Homes acquired by the council were reduced in value by 20% each year to facilitate transfer to the council's preferred development partner for a nominal sum, whilst still being within the legal parameters for achieving fair market value. An illustrative case was a three-story house in Kelvin Grove, purchased for £110,000 in 2011 and saw its value plummet to £1,100 by 2015. Following the formation of the coalition government in 2010, schemes funded by the previous government were reviewed and ultimately funding for the pathfinder scheme was withdrawn with effect from 30 March 2011. The sudden withdrawal of funding left many schemes half-finished and some neighbourhoods only partially demolished, although others such as the Welsh Streets were spared demolition.

=== Opinions and renewal proposals ===
Clearance proved contentious, with some taking the view that the houses were beyond rescue, while others believed them to be fundamentally sound. Campaigning charities led by Merseyside Civic Society and Save Britain's Heritage asserted that renovation would be preferable and cheaper. Although predominantly of Victorian architecture, some of the properties had been constructed during the 1950s and 1960s as post-war replacement houses and these were described in an Affordable Housing Program assessment as having "no value in the context of the 19th century terraced houses".

In 2011, Secretary of State for Housing, Communities and Local Government Eric Pickles quashed planning permission for demolition and required an Environmental Impact Assessment. New proposals for demolition of 250 houses were endorsed by Liverpool Mayor Joe Anderson in 2012 and Housing Minister Grant Shapps, who visited the area to announce retention of 9 Madryn Street and 15 adjacent homes.

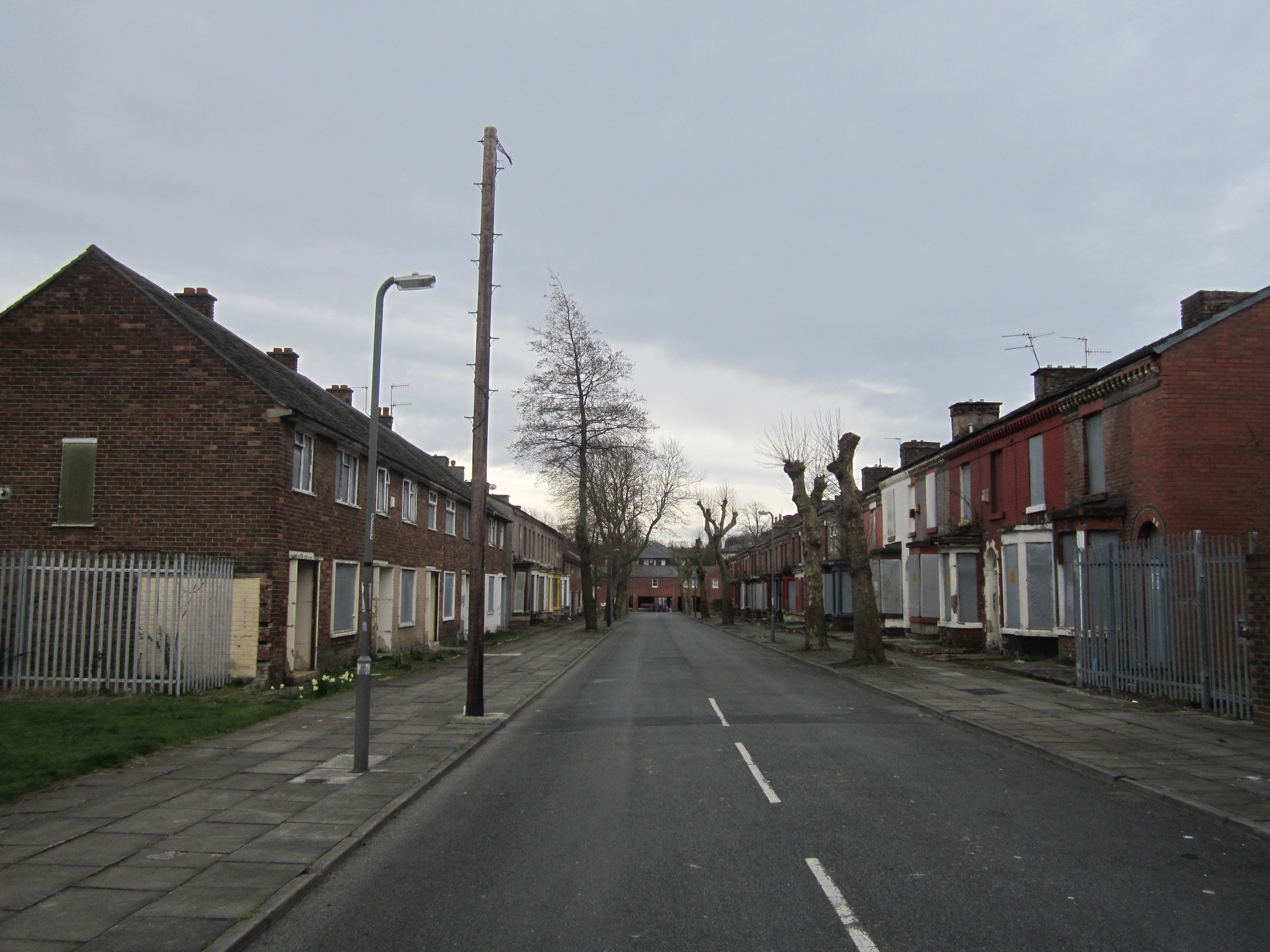
Wynnstay Street in 2013, showing the 1950s houses to the left

Plans submitted in 2013 suggested that 150 houses could be built and 40 refurbished, including those around the house where Ringo Starr was born. The cost was estimated to be in the region of £15 million which would have seen the demolition of houses from the other surrounding Welsh Streets to be replaced with semi-detached properties. The managing director of the proposed regeneration, Claire Griffiths, suggested that 70% of residents had favoured the plans, yet housing charity Empty Homes disputed the credibility of the public opinion report, given the criteria used would have made it difficult to conclude refurbishment as a favourable option. The development proposed retaining and refurbishing properties on Kelvin Grove, numbers 1 to 16 on Madryn Street and a handful on South Street and High Park Street. The total number of properties proposed for demolition in the first phase were 279, while the number of new builds would be 152. Anderson wrote to Pickles in July 2013, confirming his support on the proposed redevelopment, suggesting the decision should be a local matter and believed the scale of the proposal was "not of national importance" and with "no design or heritage issues arising".

The plans ultimately fell through when in January 2015 following a public inquiry, Eric Pickles halted the demolition plans. Pickles agreed with the argument put forward by Save Britain's Heritage and the National Trust, specifically in relation to Madryn Street, in that demolition of much of the street, together with the wider Welsh Streets region would "significantly harm the ability to understand and appreciate this part of Liverpool's Beatles heritage", citing the potential impact for future tourism if the proposals had been accepted. Although the streets had not been designated as a heritage asset, Pickles disputed that the streets were of low significance and believed the proposals would be significantly harmful to cultural heritage and have a detrimental impact on the character and appearance of the nearby Princes Park, directly contradicting the view of an inspector.

== Refurbishment ==
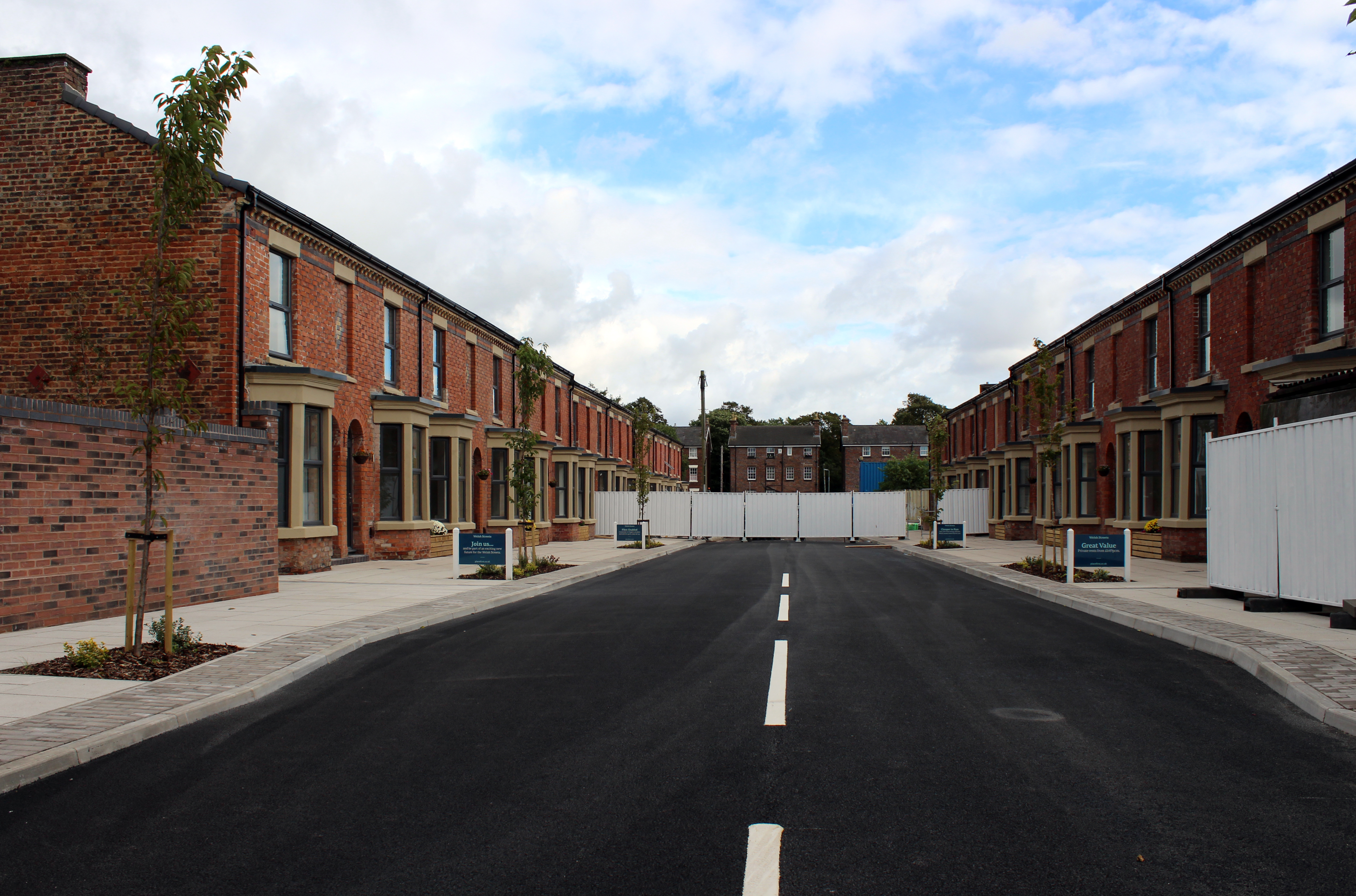
Voelas Street in September 2017, showing almost complete refurbishment

With few alternative options, refurbishment was deemed viable by the council. A partnership was agreed with Placefirst, who had experience in renewing derelict properties. A pilot scheme in 2017 involved the refurbishment of houses in Voelas Street to demonstrate how the houses could be remodelled and to determine public opinion and uptake. Upon launching the scheme to prospective tenants, all properties were taken within the first weekend, with residents expected to move in around September 2017. The renovations involved remodelling some floorplans and knocking through to adjacent homes to create larger houses, whilst retaining some of the original houses in order to cater for various residential requirements.

Following the success of the pilot scheme, refurbishment of other Welsh Streets was approved, meaning that 300 homes would be refurbished or constructed. The council hoped that around 75% of existing housing stock could be retained, with over two thirds available to rent and around 10 percent available to purchase. Long-standing vacant land on Voelas Street, Wynnstay Street and South Street became occupied by 52 new-build properties, described by the contractor as a continuation of the refurbishment of existing properties with the same landscaped communal spaces to replace the traditional yards and alleys.

== Aftermath ==
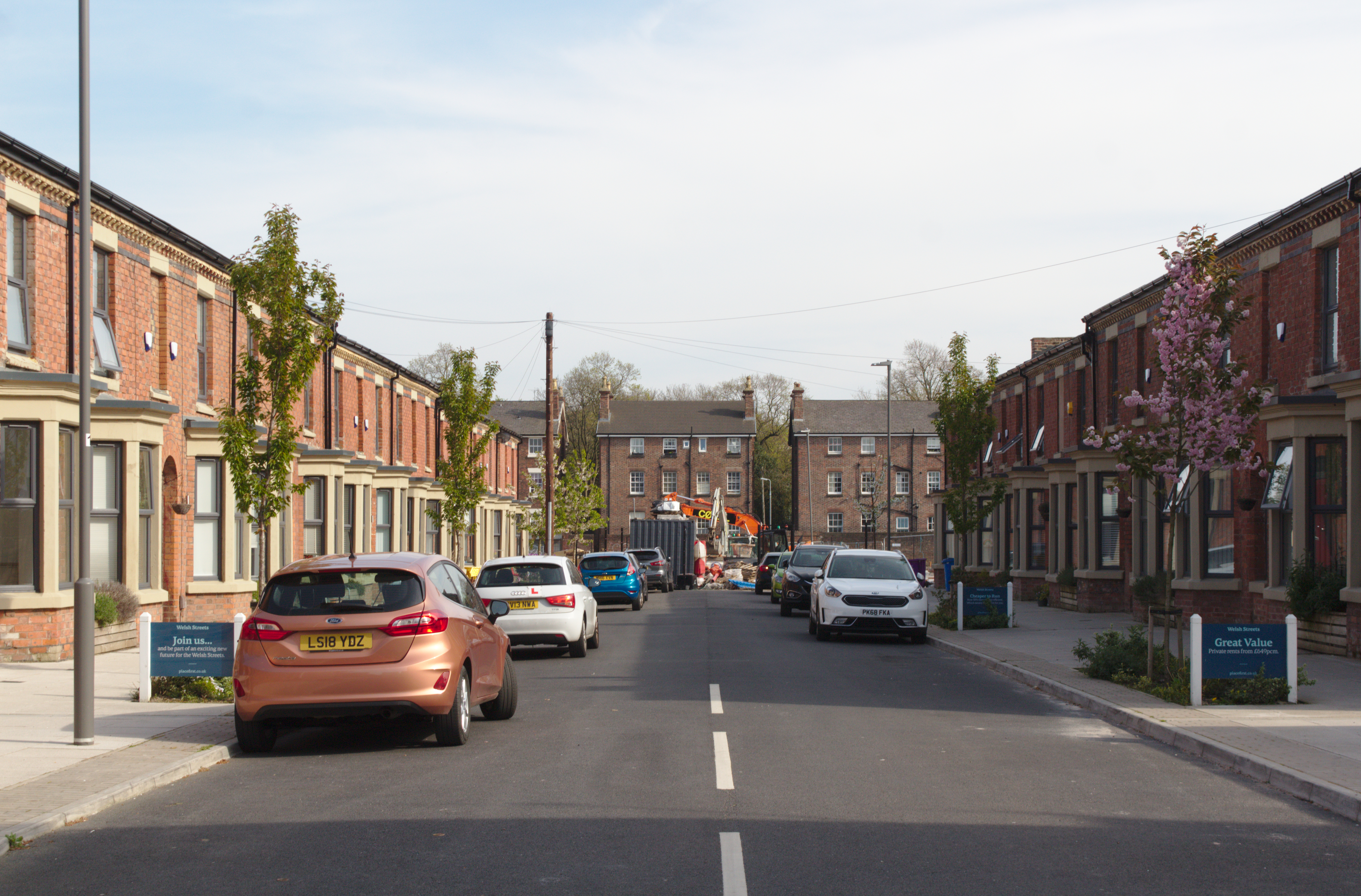
Voelas Street in April 2020, after refurbishment

The cost to the council to instigate and process the scheme was in the region of £21.7 million, of which the majority, nearly £20.9 million was required for the purchase of properties and the associated legal fees. The cost to make the properties secure was a little over £525,000 and just over £280,000 was spent to disconnect services.

In November 2018, contractor Placefirst won the Refurbishment Project of the Year Award 2018 and the 2018 Inside Housing Development Awards later that month, attended by more than 750 housing professionals. The following year in October 2019, the project was named as the top residential scheme at the Royal Institution of Chartered Surveyors Awards Grand Final. Tracey Hartley, chair of the judging panel, commented:

"The Welsh Streets is a fine example of how to breathe new life into tired, rundown terraced housing. Instead of bringing in the bulldozers, sacrificing the established street layout and embedded energy of the existing buildings, Placefirst has imaginatively refurbished the houses and surrounding areas to create desirable, modern homes in an attractive community setting."

Housing and Communities Secretary Robert Jenrick MP gave a speech in October 2019, committing to the redevelopment of Victorian-era properties over demolition, specifically referring to the Welsh Streets project as being part of "a new wave of regeneration and renewal". Jenrick suggested the programme of past governments to needlessly destroy pre-1919 terraced houses was ill-fated, suggesting focus should be on sustainability and protection of communities.

== Notability and culture ==
=== Ringo Starr birthplace ===
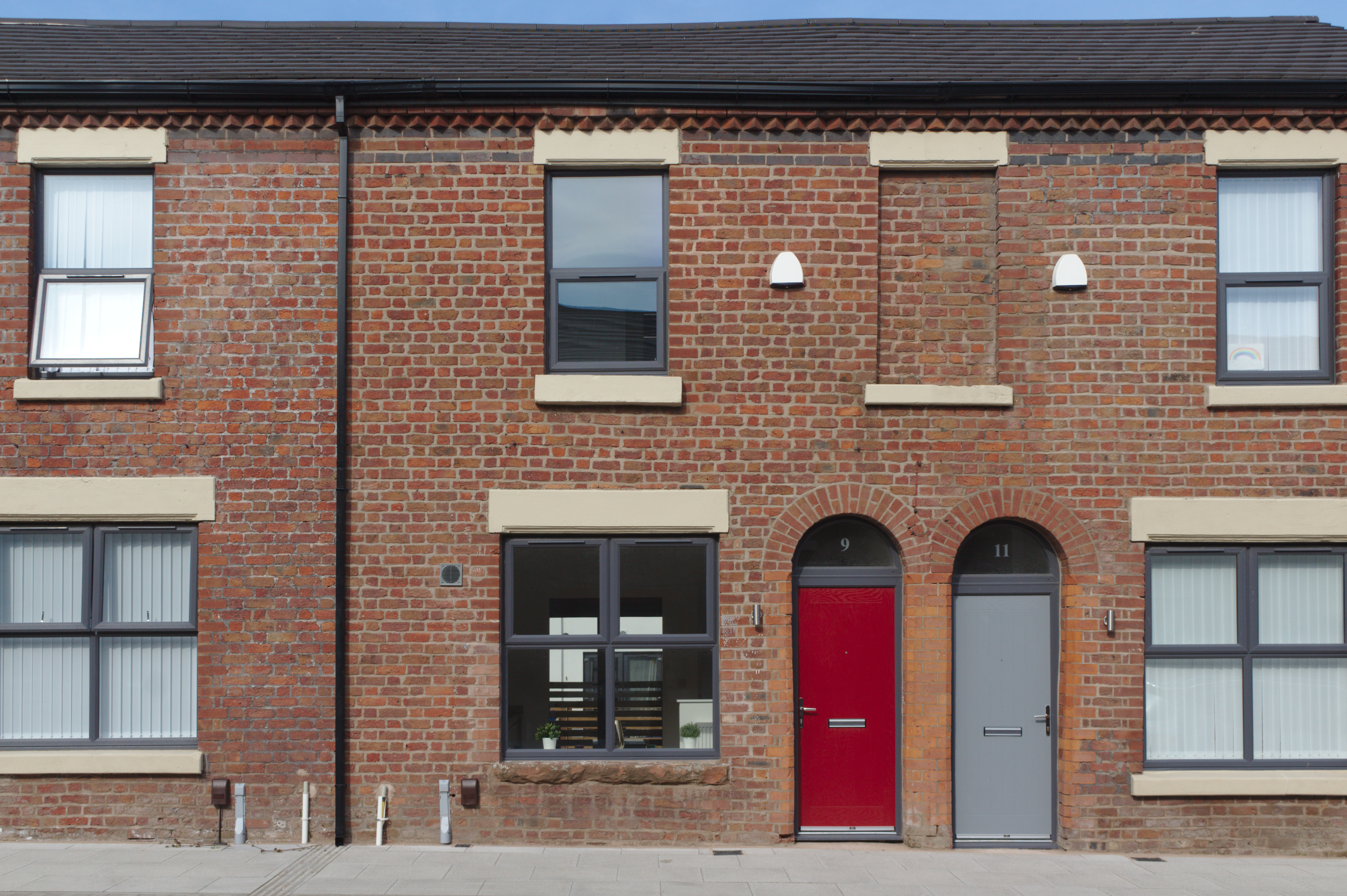
Birth home of Ringo Starr, pictured in April 2020 after refurbishment

Ringo Starr, drummer for The Beatles, was born in 9 Madryn Street, where he lived until the age of 4 before moving to nearby 10 Admiral Grove. The threat to Starr's birthplace was announced in 2003, whilst a proposal was made in September 2005 to take down the house brick by brick and rebuild it as a centrepiece for the Museum of Liverpool Life, contradicting Liverpool Council's earlier claim the house had no historic value. Starr said it was not worth taking the house down simply to rebuild it elsewhere, as it would not then be his birthplace. Many suggested demolition of the area surrounding Starr's home was unsatisfactory, claiming "People liked the city's character, not packaged replicas".

The house forms part of Liverpool's "Magical Mystery Tour" and tourists would still visit even during the period of neglect and dereliction. Among the various owners of the house were The Beatles Story, who were the registered owners in October 2010.

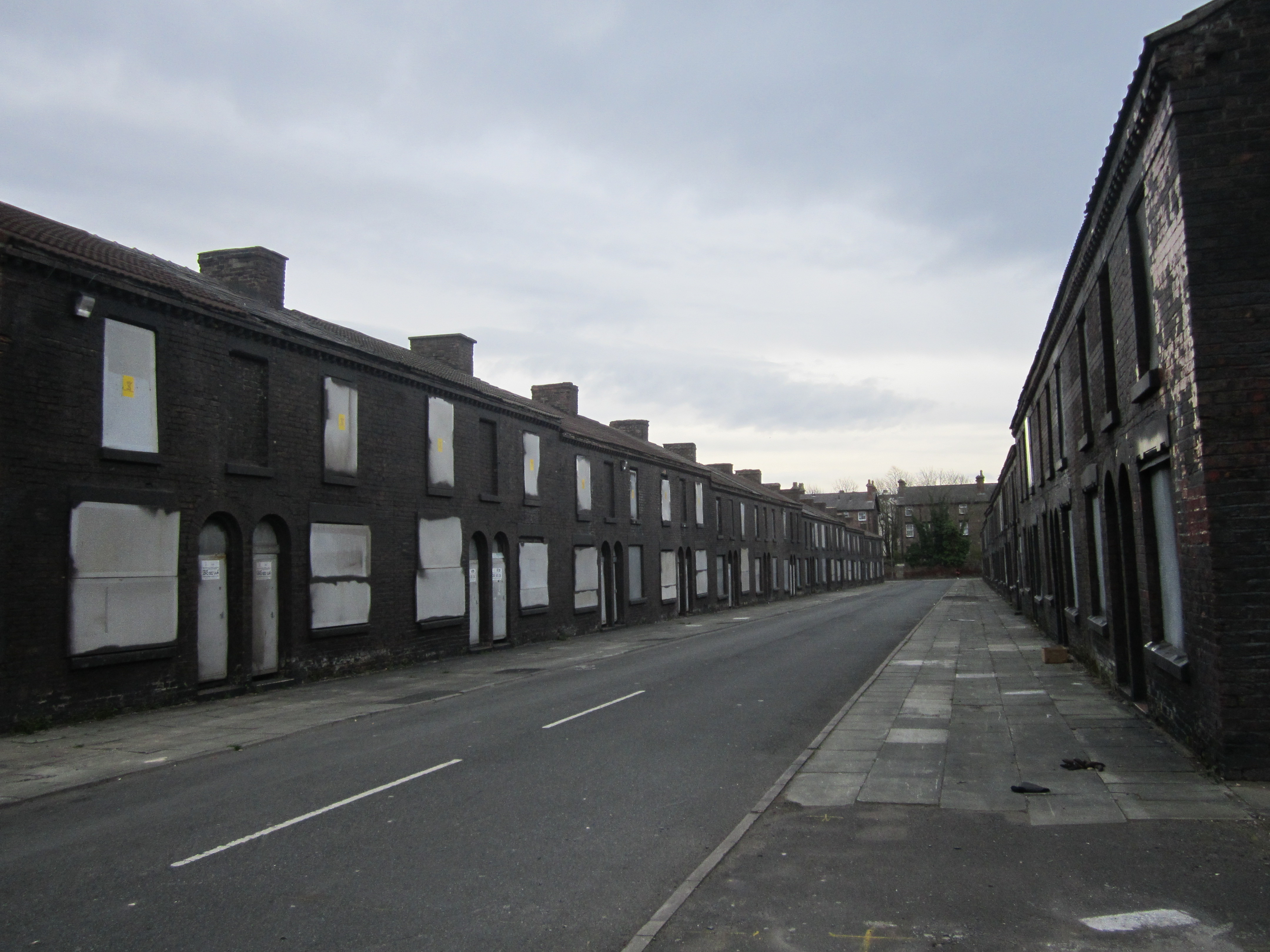
Powis Street before refurbishment, used for the series Peaky Blinders

By 2014, the value of the derelict house had fallen to just £525, having been valued around £60,000 just the year before. At one time, the house was owned by Merseytravel with frequent tourist groups visiting the property. Madryn Street remained derelict up to 2018 until refurbishment by Placefirst NorthWest as with the surrounding streets.

=== Peaky Blinders TV series ===
One of the Welsh Streets, Powis Street, doubled as Watery Lane in 1920s Birmingham for the TV series Peaky Blinders. All house exteriors were painted black to achieve the desired look and feel of the period. Filming on the street had to cease in 2017 due to refurbishment work commencing.
