= Audsley =

Audsley is a surname. Notable people with the surname include:

- Dylan Audsley (born 1994), American rugby union player
- George Ashdown Audsley (1838–1925), Scottish architect, artist, illustrator, writer, decorator and pipe organ designer
- Jack Audsley (1892–1942), Australian rules footballer
- Mary Audsley (1919–2008), British painter and sculptor
- Mick Audsley (born 1949), British film and television editor
- Nicholas Audsley (born 1982), British actor
- William Audsley (1833–1907), Scottish architect
