= Princes Road Synagogue =

Grade I listed Orthodox synagogue in Liverpool, United Kingdom

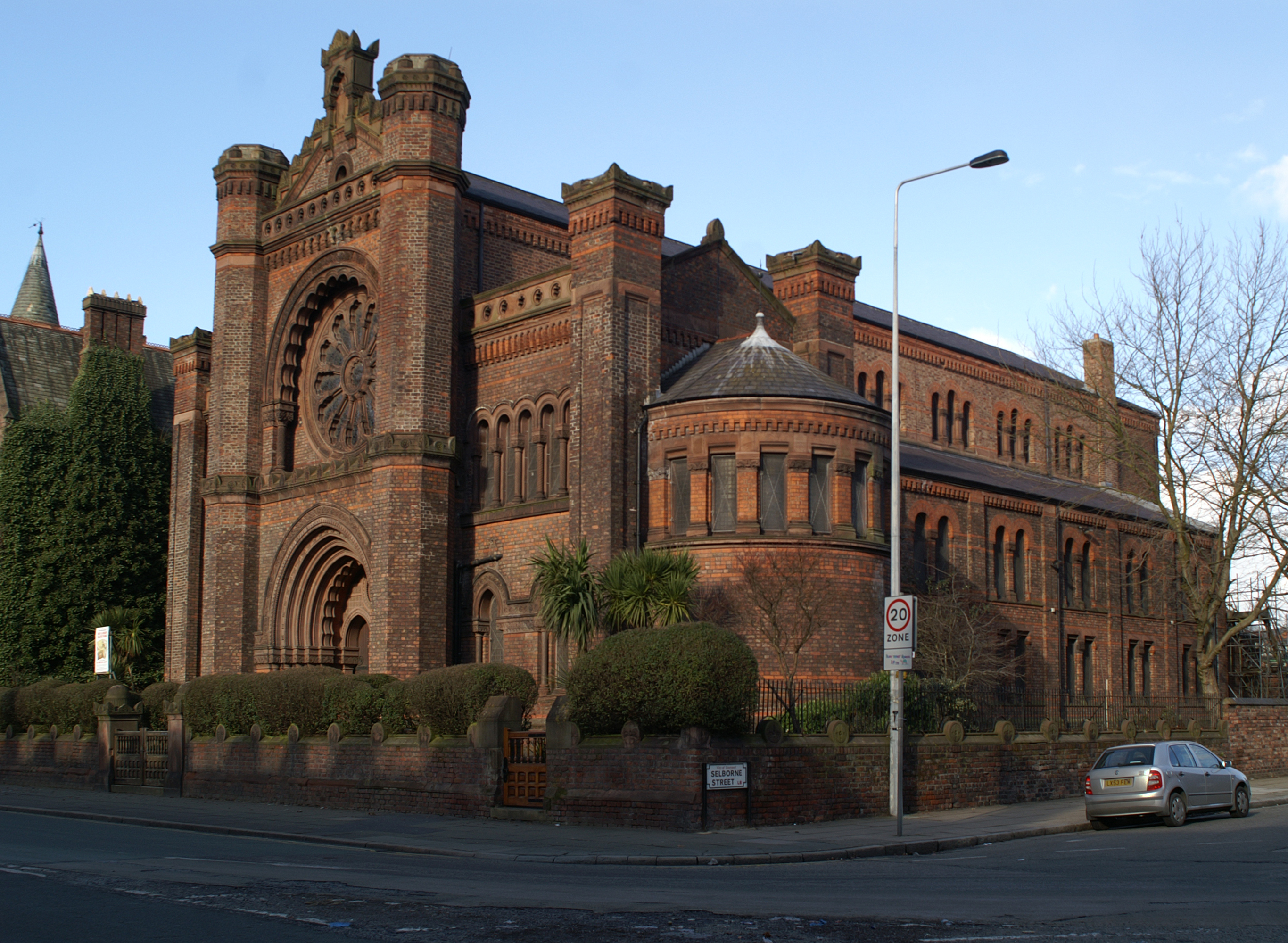
- The synagogue in February 2010

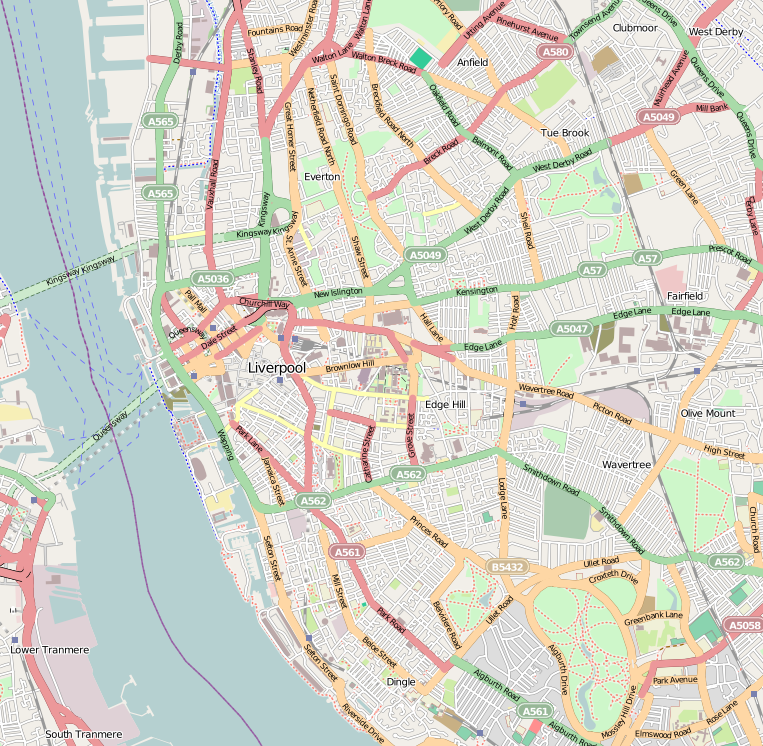
- Location of the synagogue in Liverpool

Religion
- Affiliation: Orthodox Judaism
- Rite: Nusach Ashkenaz
- Ecclesiastical or organisational status: Synagogue
- Status: Active

Location
- Location: Princes Road, Toxteth, Liverpool, England L8 1TG
- Country: United Kingdom
- Coordinates: 53°23′42″N 2°57′54″W

Architecture
- Architect: W. & G. Audsley
- Type: Synagogue architecture
- Style: Moorish Revival; Gothic Revival
- Established: c. 1780 (as a congregation)
- Groundbreaking: 1872
- Completed: 1874; 152 years ago
- Construction cost: ££14,975 (1874)
- Capacity: 824 worshipers

Listed Building – Grade I
- Official name: Princes Road Synagogue
- Type: Listed building
- Designated: 14 March 1975
- Reference no.: 1072969

Princes Road Synagogue, officially Liverpool Old Hebrew Congregation, is an Orthodox Jewish congregation and synagogue, located on Princes Road in the Toxteth district of Liverpool, England, in the United Kingdom. The congregation was formed in c. 1780 and worships in the Ashkenazi rite.

The synagogue building was designed by brothers, William James Audsley and George Ashdown Audsley, completed in 1874, and was listed as a Grade I building in 1975. The building is widely regarded as the finest example of the Moorish Revival style of synagogue architecture in the United Kingdom, and a synagogue emulating its design can be found in Sydney, Australia.

== History ==
Princes Road Synagogue came into existence when the Jewish community in Liverpool in the late 1860s decided to build a new synagogue, reflecting the status and wealth of the community. The Toxteth area was rapidly expanding as Liverpool's magnates built opulent mansions. The synagogue stands in a cluster of houses of worship designed to advertise the wealth and status of the local captains of industry, a group that was remarkably ethnically diverse by the standards of Victorian England; immediately adjacent to the synagogue on Princes Road are the Greek Orthodox Church of St Nicholas, the Church of England's parish of St Margaret of Antioch, and the Welsh Presbyterian Church.

Construction on the synagogue was completed in 1874. The idea for the synagogue mixed both eastern and western schools of art.

The synagogue was designed by William James Audsley and George Ashdown Audsley, Scottish architect brothers from Edinburgh, and built at a cost of approximately £14,975. It was consecrated on 2 September 1874. The building has been described as "eclectic" and it has been said that the synagogue exemplifies the characteristic eclectic architecture in harmoniously blending features drawn from different styles.

The ladies of the Liverpool Old Hebrew Congregation held a bazaar and luncheon in February 1874. They invited the important dignitaries and arranged for the band of the Coldstream Guards to play. The event raised approximately £3,000 (equivalent to £346,920 in 2020) which was donated to the synagogue for the decoration of the interior. The synagogue is a testament to the wealth and social position of Liverpool's 19th-century Jewish magnates, a group with the wealth and taste to also commission Max Bruch to compose the Kol Nidre variations for cello and orchestra.

The synagogue today is attended only on Shabbat mornings and holidays, though it remains popular for weddings and b'nai mitzvah.

It was re opened after 9 months in August 2021 after having previously been closed due to the Covid-19 pandemic.

The synagogue was featured prominently in a stamp released for the coronation of King Charles III, intended to celebrate religious diversity.

== Description ==
The synagogue is of brick construction, with bright terracotta bricks being used extensively for decoration. The façade reveals the plan of the building, a basilica with nave and aisles. The central section juts forward from the aisles. It has a large Moorish portal divided by a central column, above which is a large wheel window in the Romanesque style, both deeply recessed in arches.

The synagogue has a central nave with aisles on either side, separated by an arcade carried on slender octagonal columns, which also support galleries over the aisles. The nave has a barrel vault lit by clerestory windows. The interior is notable for its lavish decoration, including gilding and unstinting use of the finest woods and marbles. H. A. Meek was so impressed with the design that he wrote in his 1995 book The Synagogue, "He who has not seen the interior of Princes Road Synagogue in Liverpool has not beheld the glory of Israel."

The synagogue has been a listed building since 1975.

== Images ==
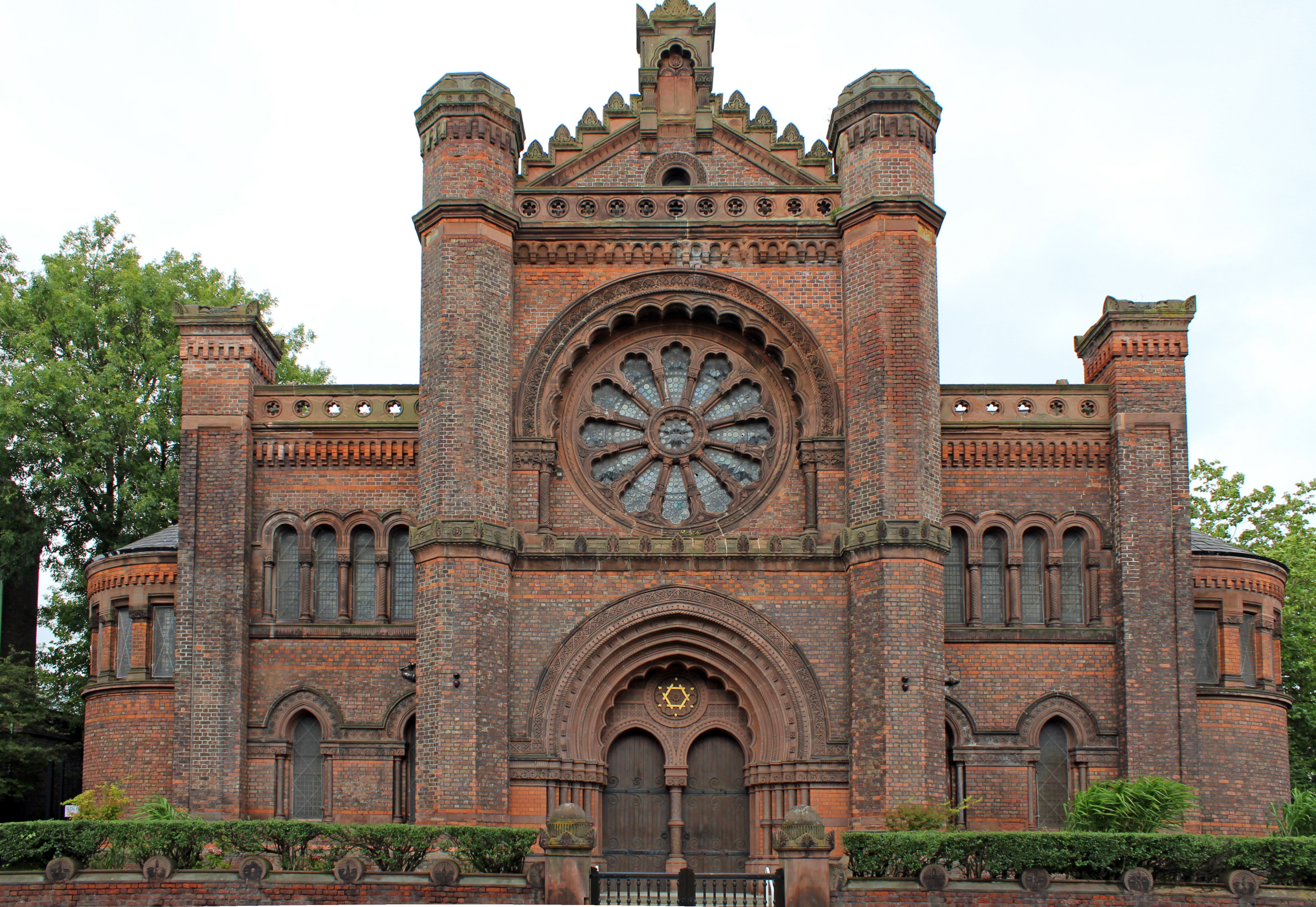
Façade

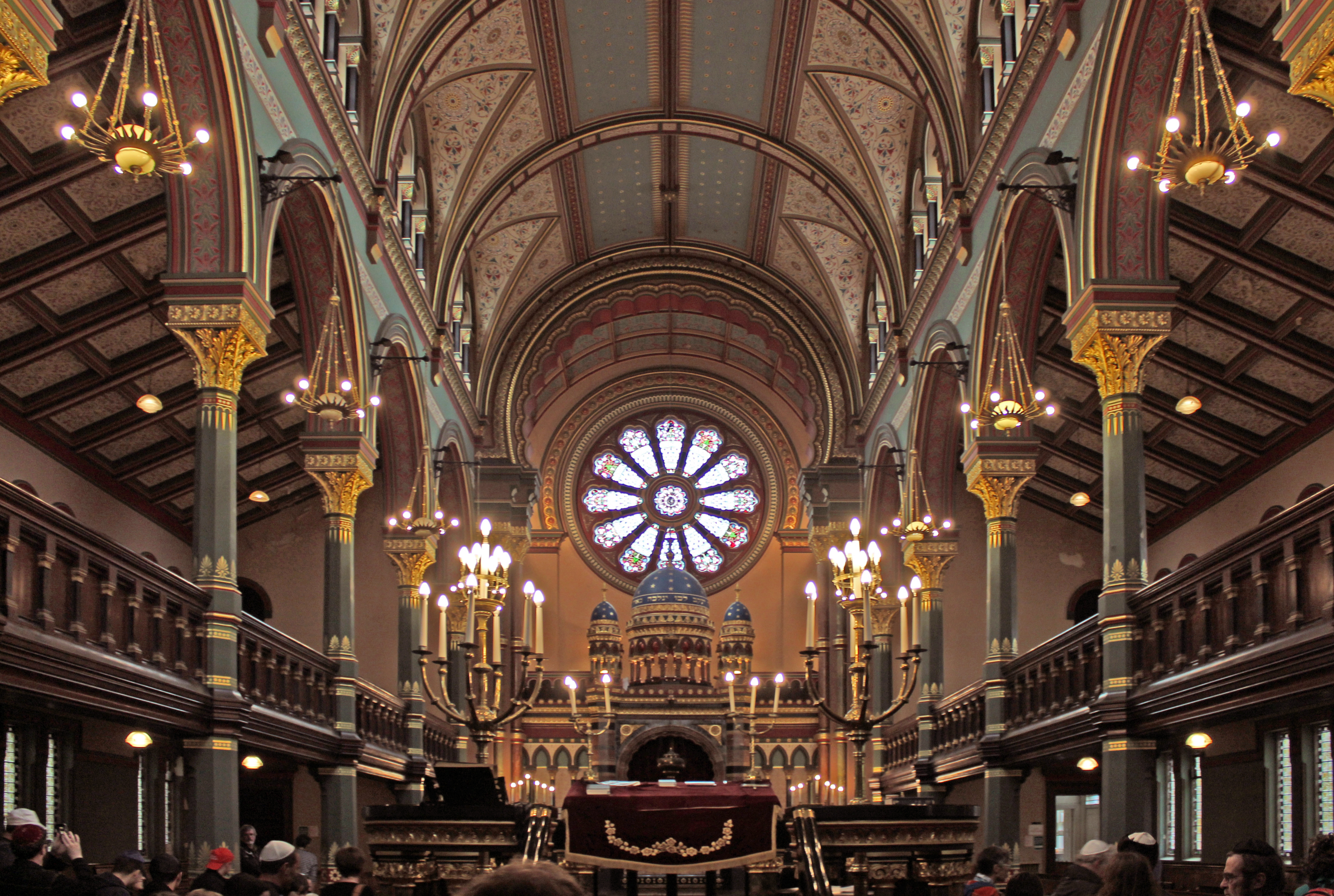
Nave looking east

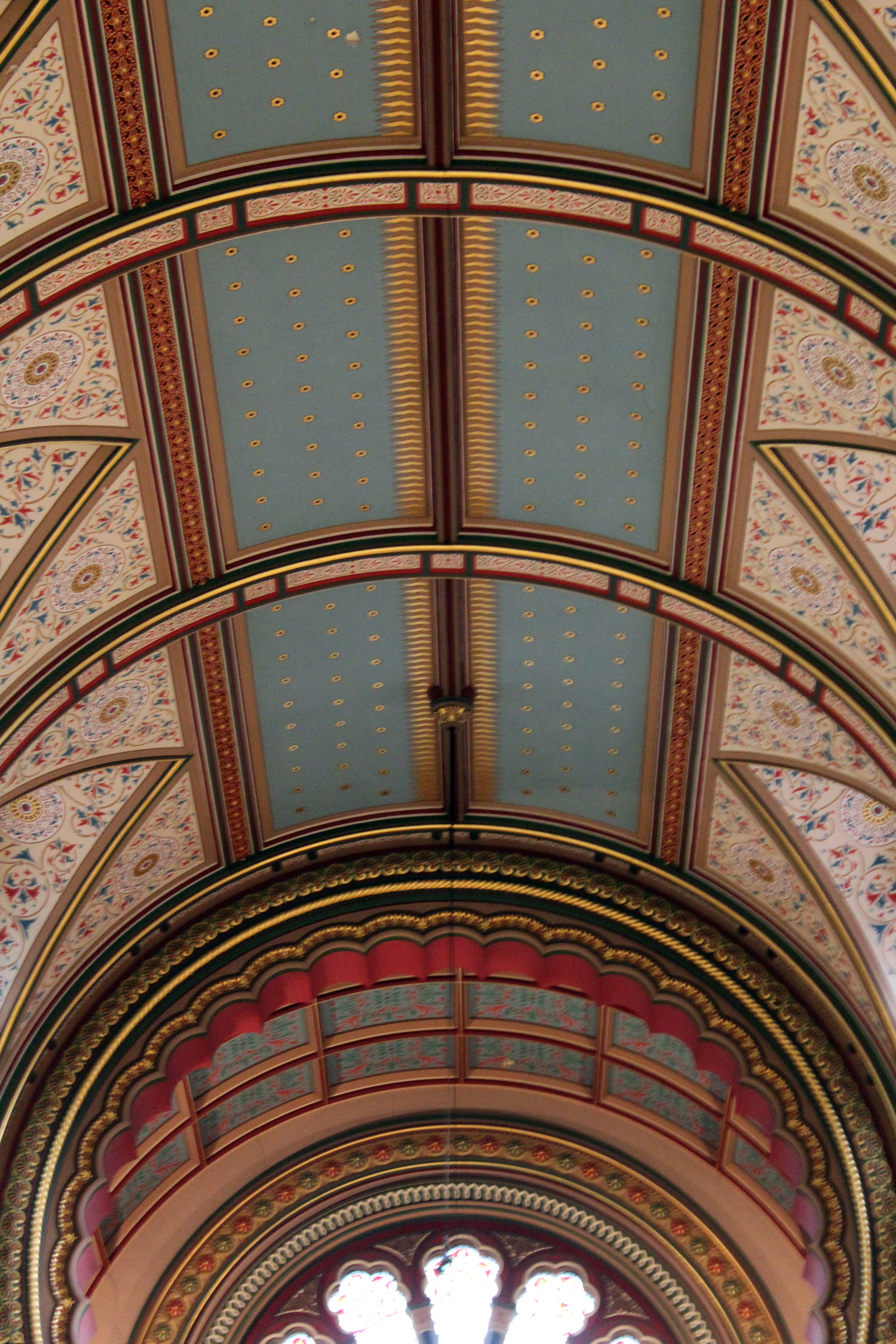
Ceiling

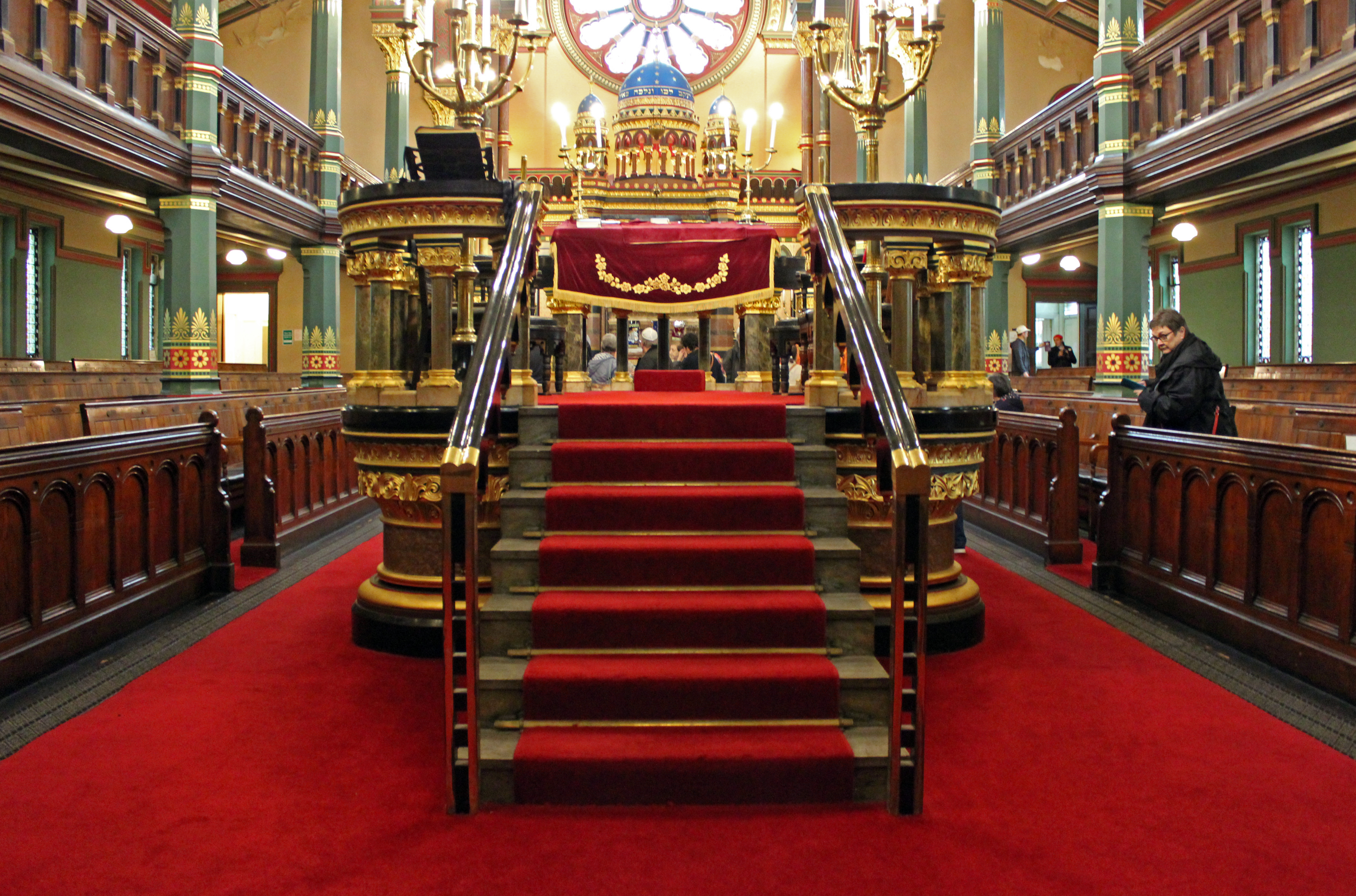
Bimah

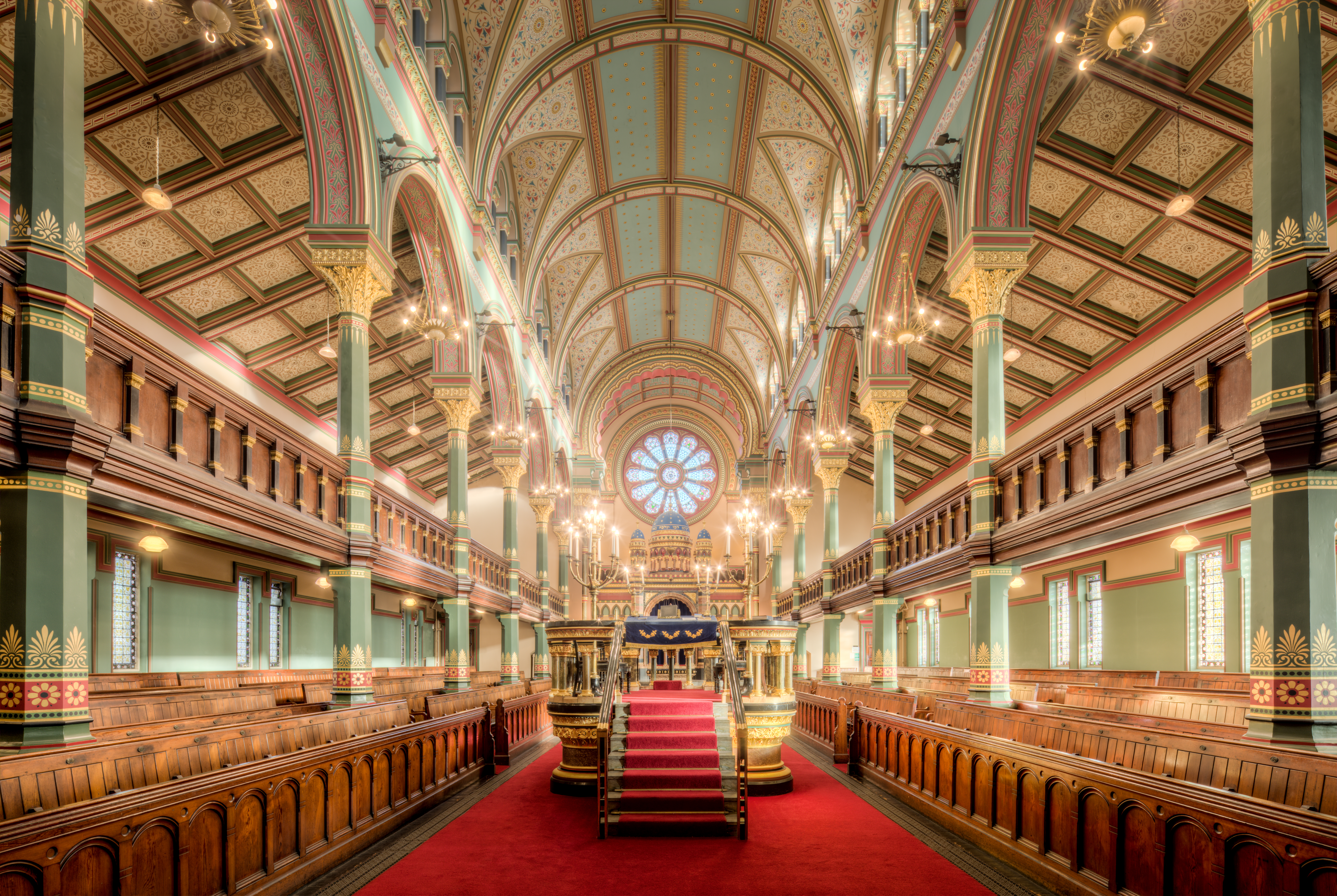
Inside

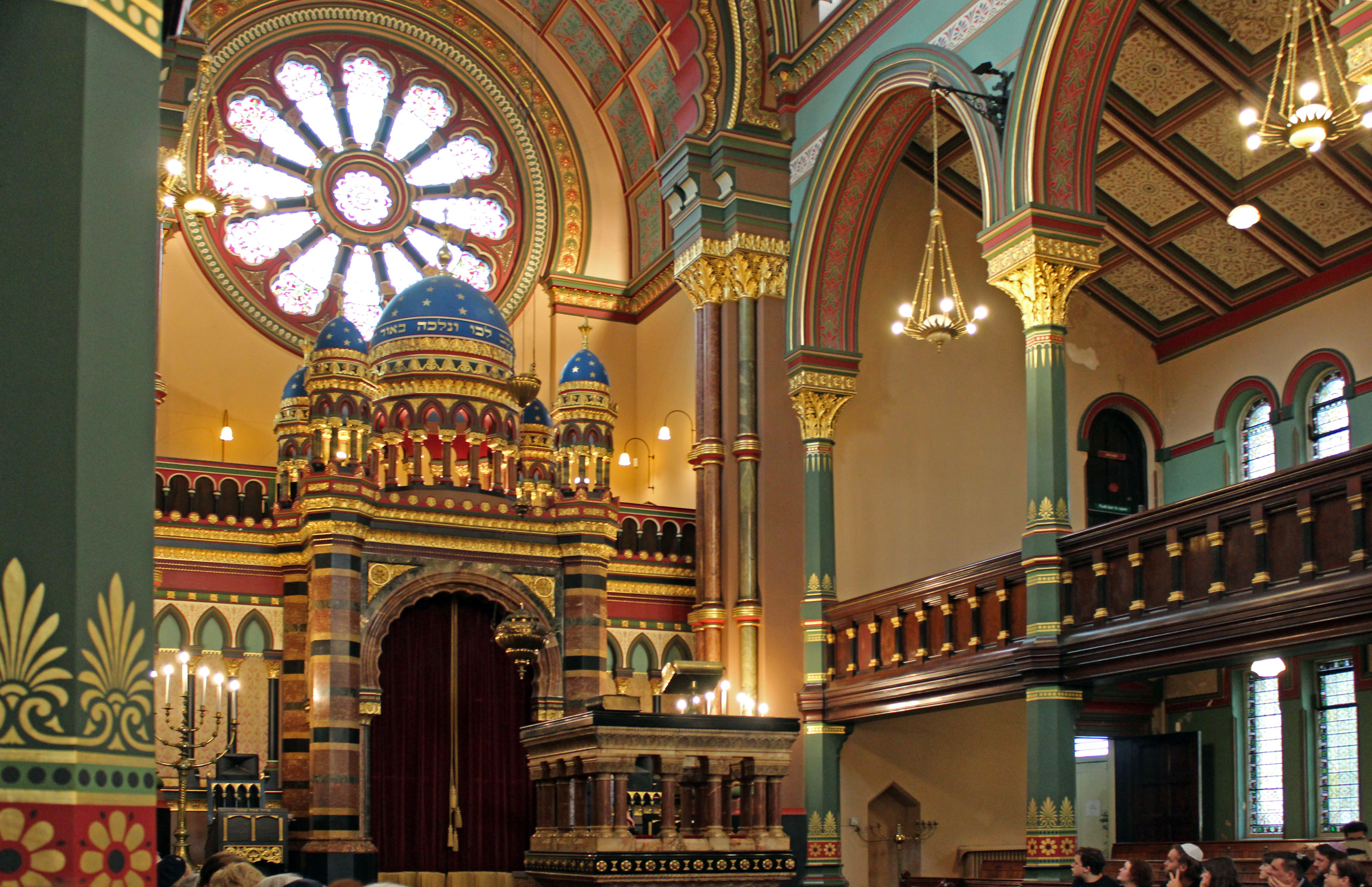
Torah ark

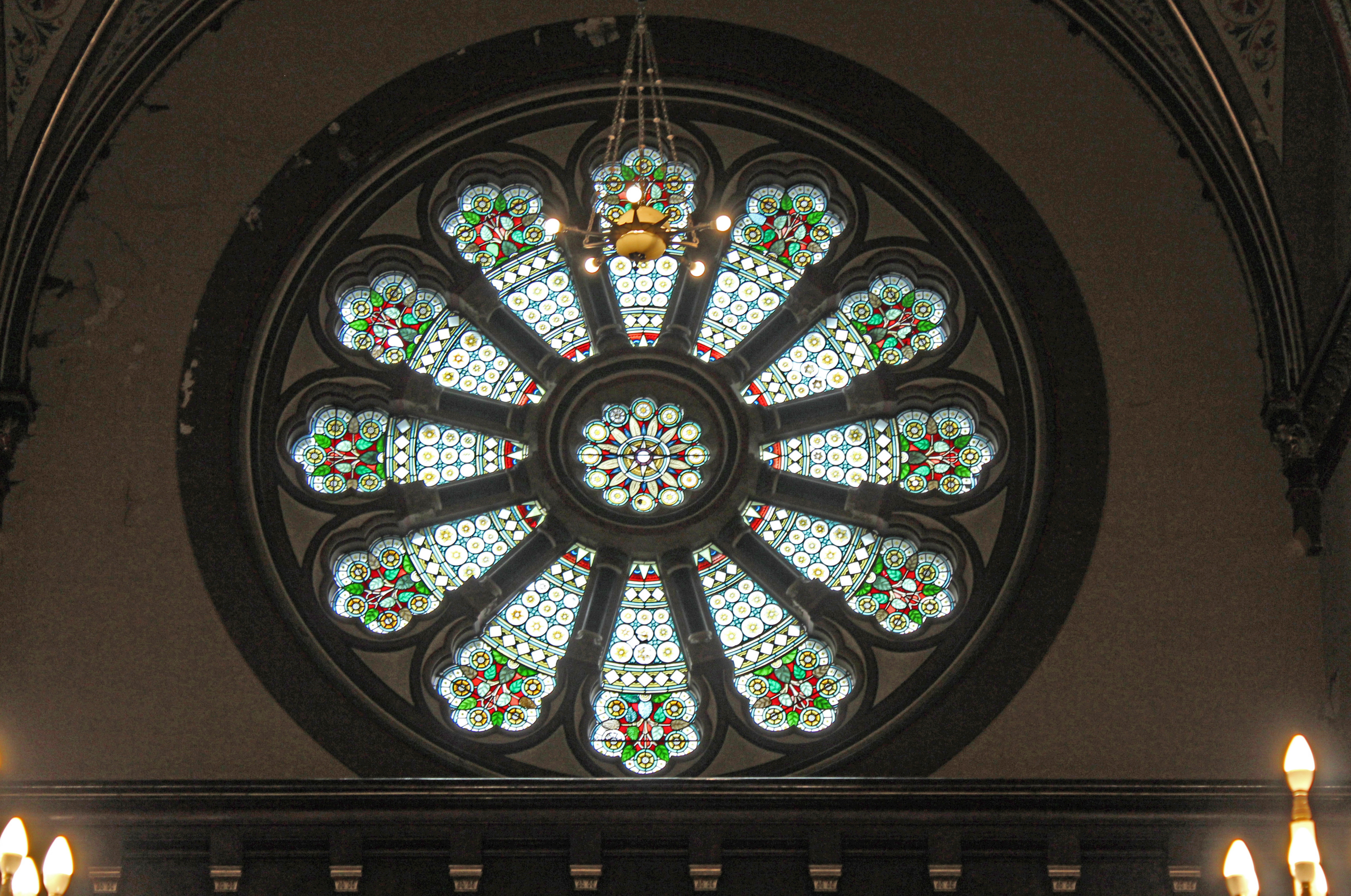
West window

== See also ==
- Architecture of Liverpool
- History of the Jews in England
- List of Jewish communities in the United Kingdom
- List of synagogues in the United Kingdom
