= Welsh Presbyterian Church =

Welsh Presbyterian Church may refer to:

in the United Kingdom

- The Presbyterian Church of Wales, a Christian denomination formerly known as the Calvinistic Methodists
- Welsh Presbyterian Church, Chester
- Welsh Presbyterian Church, Liverpool, also known as Toxteth Cathedral
- Welsh Presbyterian Chapel, Charing Cross Road, London
- Welsh Presbyterian Chapel, Southwark, London

in the United States

- Welsh Presbyterian Church (Los Angeles), listed as a Los Angeles Historic-Cultural Monument
- Welsh Presbyterian Church (Columbus, Ohio), listed on the National Register of Historic Places in (NRHP) Franklin County
- Welsh Presbyterian Church (Plana, South Dakota), NRHP-listed in Brown County

== See also ==
- Welsh Church (disambiguation)
