= Merseyside Centre for the Deaf =

Building in Liverpool, Merseyside, UK

Coordinates: 53.3950°N 2.9643°W

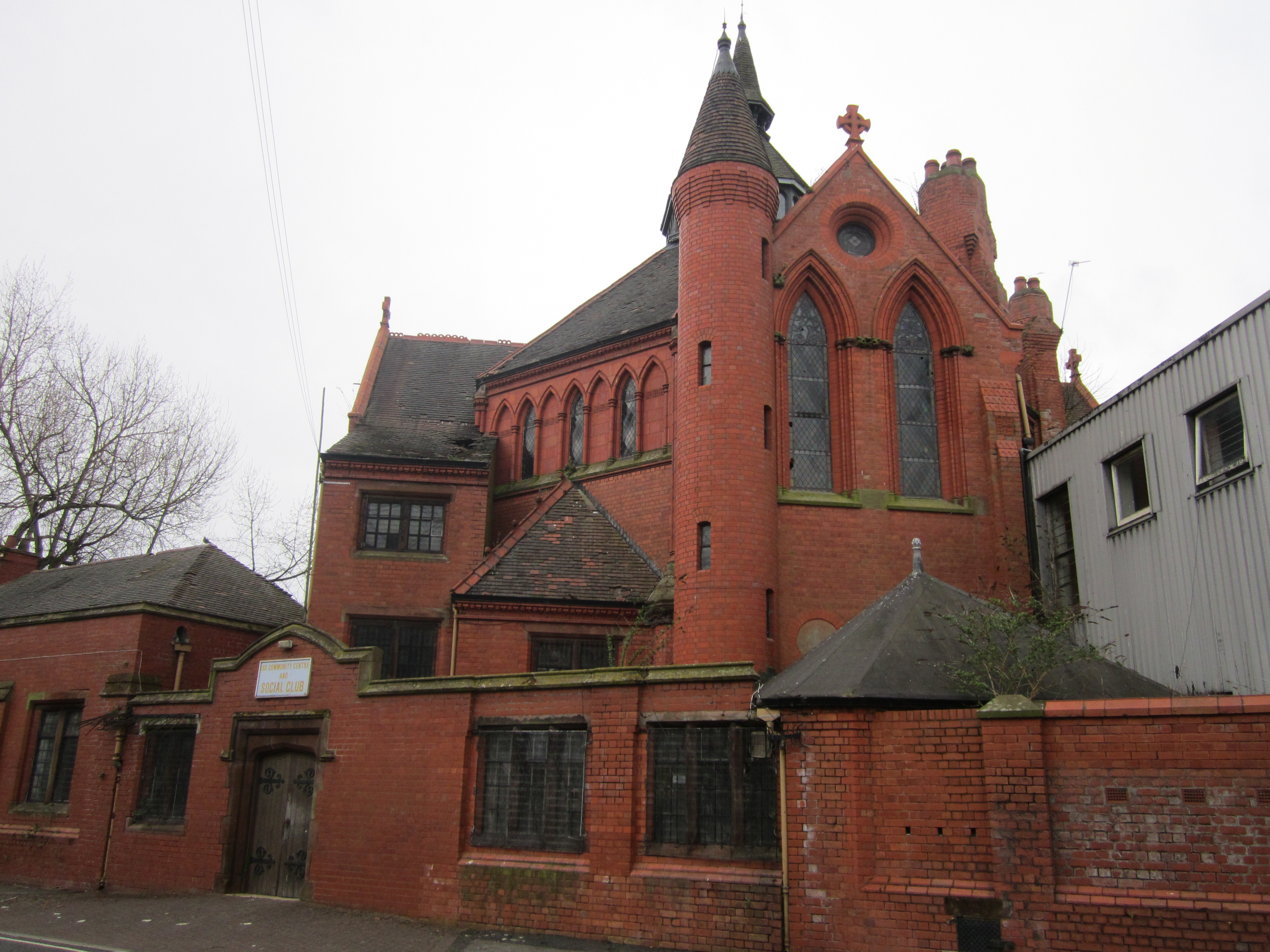
The Princes Avenue building

The Merseyside Centre for the Deaf, formerly the Adult Deaf and Dumb Institute, is an 1887 Grade II listed building on Princes Avenue in Liverpool, England.

In 2018 it was named by the Victorian Society as a heritage building at risk of disrepair. Initially built as a chapel for the Merseyside deaf community, the society said the "once grand" gothic structure was now in a "terrible state". For 20 years after it closed in 1986 it was run as a successful community centre for the local Igbo community but rising costs forced them out in 2007.

The Merseyside Society for Deaf People (MSDP) is now a charity situated on Queens Drive retail park, west Derby. It has over 30 staff providing services across Merseyside, and moved into a new building in 2017.
