= Princes Avenue =

Princes Avenue may refer to:

- Princes Avenue, Kingston upon Hull, a street in Hull, England
- Princes Avenue, a street in Liverpool
