= Welsh Church =

The Welsh church may refer to:

- Church in Wales
- Roman Catholic Church in England and Wales

== Individual churches outside Wales ==
- Melbourne Welsh Church, Australia
- United Welsh Church, Blackstone, Australia
- Welsh Church of Central London, United Kingdom
- Salem Welsh Church, United States

== See also ==
- Christianity in Wales
- Welsh Presbyterian Church (disambiguation)
