= W. & G. Audsley =

Architectural practice in Liverpool, UK

W. & G. Audsley was the architectural practice founded in Liverpool, UK, by Scottish Brothers William James Audsley and George Ashdown Audsley.

It completed churches in the Gothic Revival Style in the Liverpool area. An eclectic style was used for synagogues built in Liverpool and London. The firm's secular buildings, such as the Layton Art Gallery in Milwaukee, Wisconsin, US, closely followed the style of Alexander Thomson (1817–1875), featuring Greek, Egyptian and Hindu motifs.

== Buildings ==
- Welsh Presbyterian Church, Saint John Street, Chester, 1866; extant.
- Welsh Presbyterian Church, 40 Prince's Road corner of Upper Hill Street, Liverpool, 1868; derelict.
- Welsh Presbyterian Church; 42 Chapel Road near Russell Road, Garston, Liverpool, 1868; extant.
- Christ Church, Kensington Road, Kensington, Liverpool, 1870, In use but added to Historic England’s Heritage at Risk Register in 2022.
- James Lord Bowes Residence, Streatlam Tower, 5 Prince's Road, Liverpool, 1872, extant.
- Saint Margaret's Church, Belmont Road, Anfield, Liverpool, 1873; burnt 1961.
- Saint Mary's Church, Ellel Grange estate (3 miles southwest of Lancaster), Lancashire, 1873; derelict.
- Princes Road Synagogue, Old Hebrew Synagogue, Prince's Road, Liverpool, 1874; turrets removed in 1957; extant.
- Liverpool Art Club Picture Gallery, 98 Upper Parliament Street, Liverpool, date unknown; demolished.
- Parish Church, Huyton, Lancashire, pre-1890; a "restoration."
- Prescot Parish Church, Lancashire, pre-1890; a "restoration."
- Welsh Church, Seion Chapel (Capel-y-Groes Welsh Presbyterian Chapel), Wrexham, Wales, 1878; demolished 1981.
- New West End Synagogue, Saint Petersburg Place, Bayswater, London, 1879; extant.
- Racquet Club & Courts, 100 Upper Parliament Street, Liverpool, 1879; burnt 1981.
- St Andrew's Church, Bebington, 1872; a "restoration."
- G. A. Audsley Residence, Ivy Villa, Devon Nook, Duke's Avenue, Chiswick, Middlesex, c. 1880; demolished 1961–1962.
- The Towers, Sefton Park, Liverpool, 44 Ullet Road; 1870s.
- Attribution (doubtful): Commercial building, 92 Bold Street, Liverpool; extant
- English Church (Eglise Anglican Reformé); 65 Avenue Victoria, Grasse, France; extant.
- Layton Art Gallery, 758 North Jefferson Street, Milwaukee, Wisconsin, 1888; demolished 1958.
- Bowling Green Offices, 11 Broadway, New York City, New York, 1896; extant; alterations include addition of an extra story and extensive interior renovations.
- Saint Mary, Our Lady, Star of the Sea, Roman Catholic School, 13th Street, east of Avenue C, Bayonne, New Jersey, 1898; demolished; new school erected 1961.
- Eugene C. Clarke Residence, addition of music room with organ, northeast corner of Broadway and Odell Avenue, Yonkers, New York; date unknown; demolished.
- Our Lady of Grace Roman Catholic Church, Hoboken, New Jersey, painted decoration of the interior, 1899; obliterated.
- Christ Protestant Episcopal Church branch chapel, 110 Wolcott Street between Van Brunt and Conover Streets, Red Hook, Brooklyn, NY, 1899–1900; demolished.
- Christ Episcopal Church, 2 Emerson Street, East Norwalk, Connecticut, 1906; extant.
- Public Library, 1 Belden Avenue, Norwalk, Connecticut, 1903; extant with large additions.
- Saint Edward the Confessor Roman Catholic Church, 8th & York streets, Philadelphia, Pennsylvania, 1906; corner turrets of tower removed; building closed in 1993; extant as Highway Temple of Deliverance.
- Saint Joan of Arc Roman Catholic School, 3568 Frankford Avenue, Philadelphia, Pennsylvania, 1922; extant as Deep Roots Charter School.
- Bank Building(s), general area of Union County or Newark, New Jersey, c. 1897. Perhaps unexecuted.
- Protestant Episcopal Church (Interior), Eckington, Washington D.C. Perhaps unexecuted.
