= Greek Orthodox Church of St Nicholas, Toxteth =

Church in Liverpool, Merseyside, England

Coordinates: 53.3954°N 2.9671°W

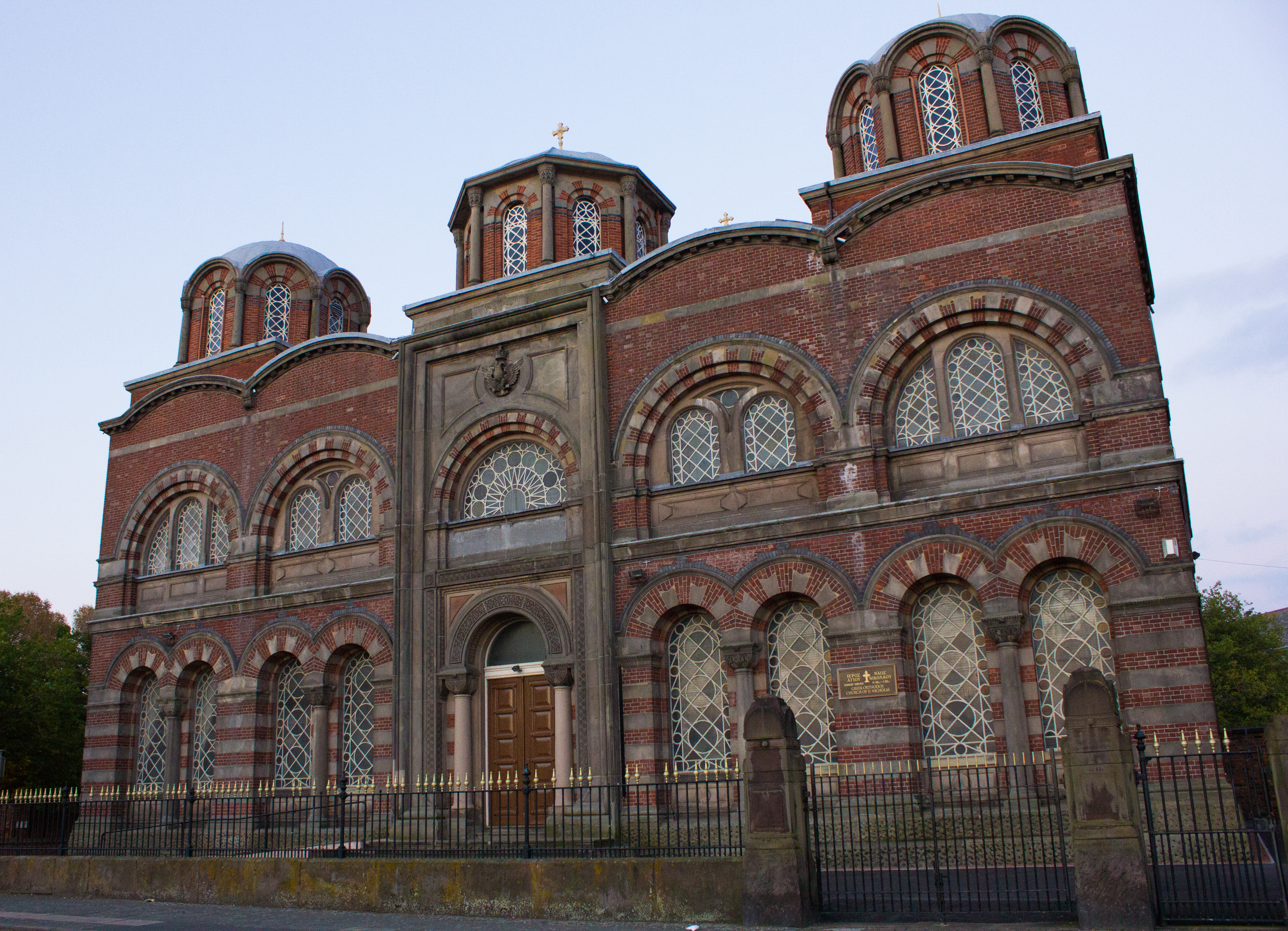
St Nicholas Greek Orthodox Church.

The Greek Orthodox Church of St Nicholas is a Grade II Listed building in Toxteth, Liverpool, situated at the junction of Berkley Street and Princes Road. Built in the Neo-Byzantine architecture style, it was completed in 1870. The architects were W. & J. Hay and the church was built by Henry Sumners. It is an enlarged version of St Theodore's church in Constantinople (now converted into the Vefa Kilise Mosque).

St. Nicholas' was built in the Liverpool neighbourhood of Toxteth in a period when Liverpool's magnates were filling Toxteth with opulent mansions. The church stands in a neighbourhood of substantial homes and in a cluster of houses of worship designed to advertise the wealth and status of a group of captains of industry that was remarkably ethnically diverse, by the standards of Victorian England. Immediately adjacent to St. Nicholas are the Princes Road Synagogue and an early French gothic, Welsh Presbyterian Church.

The exterior is extremely ornate, featuring arches within arches, done in alternating bands of white stone and red brick. There is a row of three domes on the portico, and a fourth dome over the nave, all raised on drums. The interior, with white marble columns and Byzantine capitals, is surprisingly plain compared with the exterior.

== Images of the interior ==
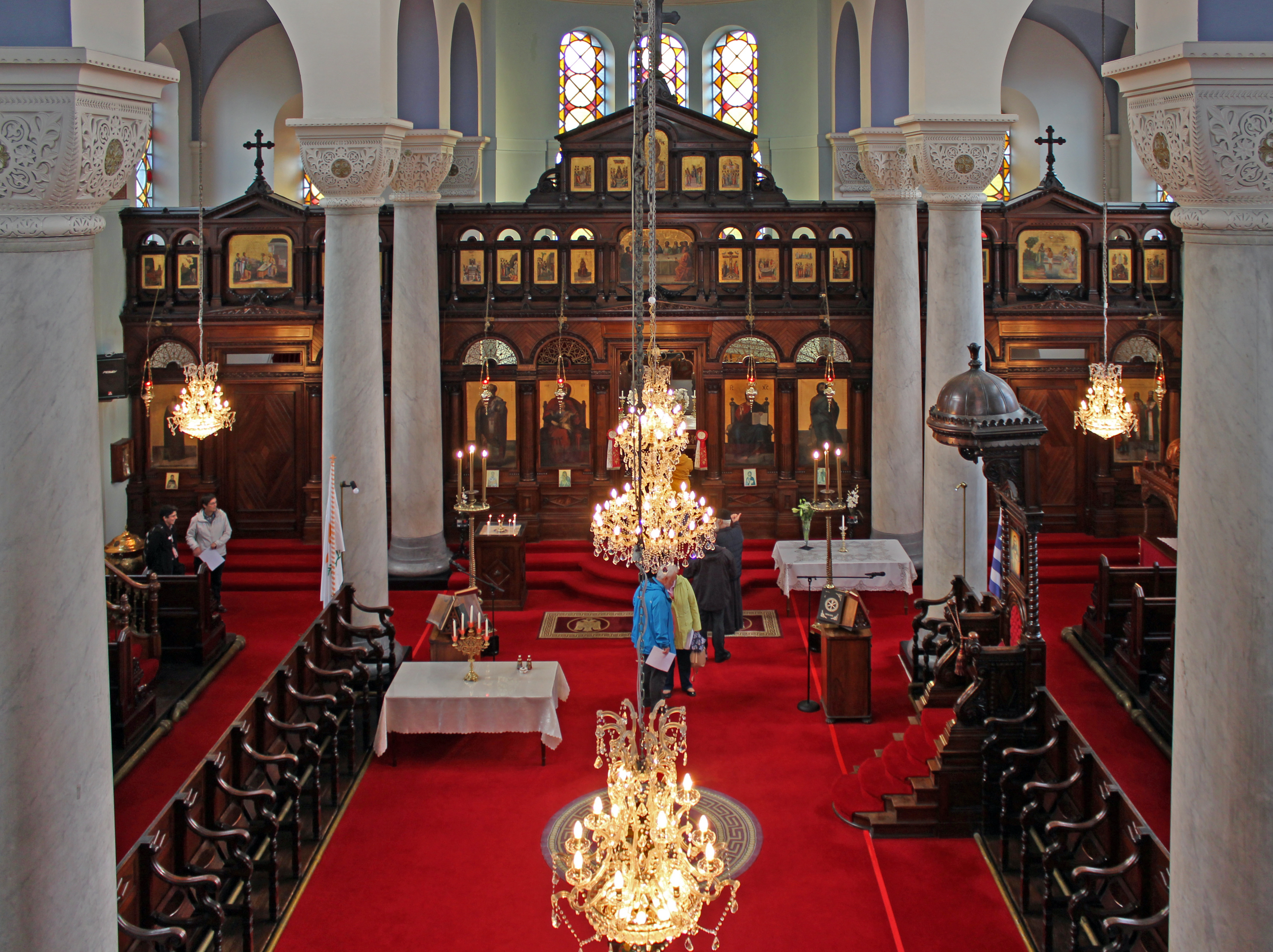
Nave as seen from the balcony

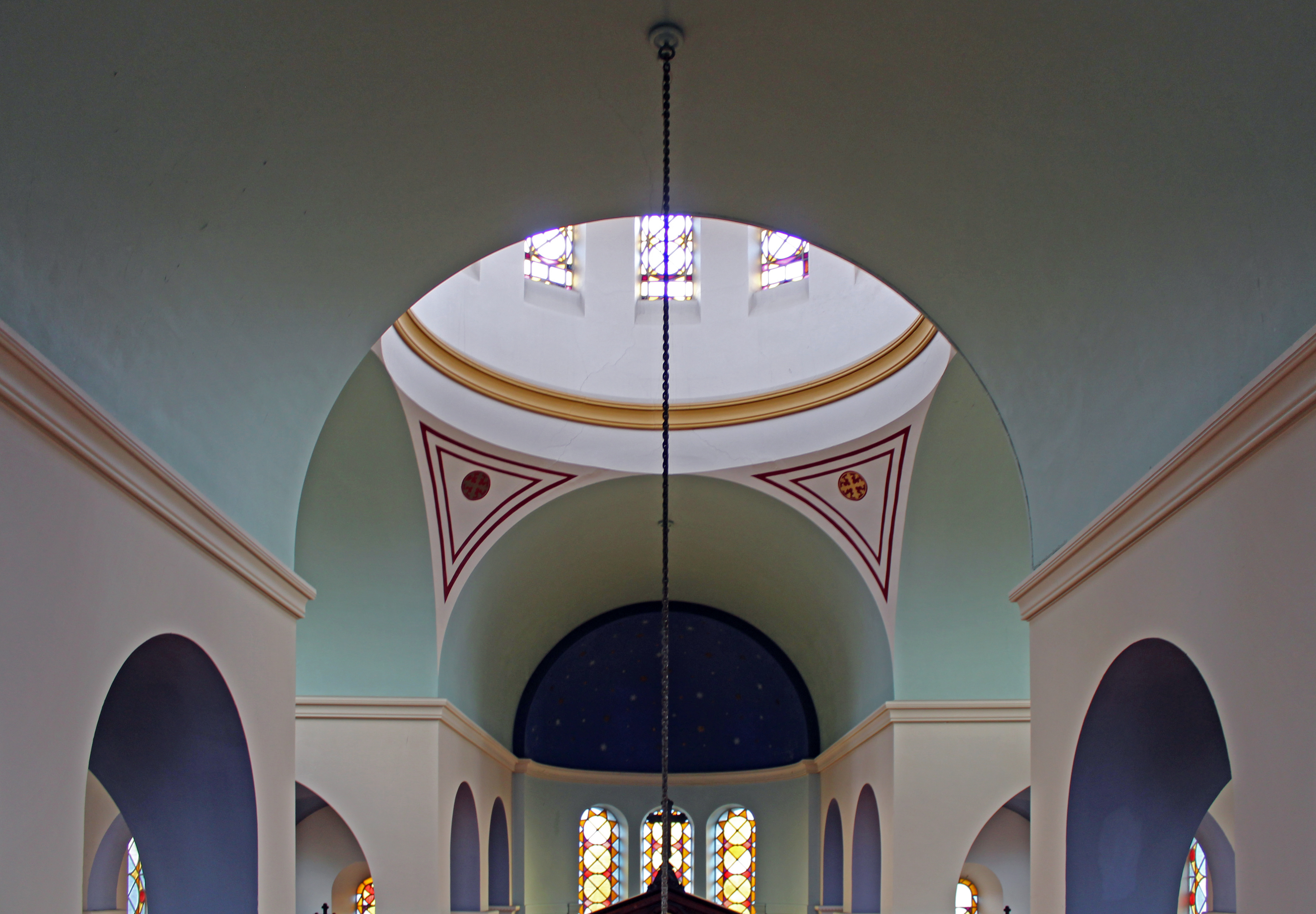
View of the roof and central dome

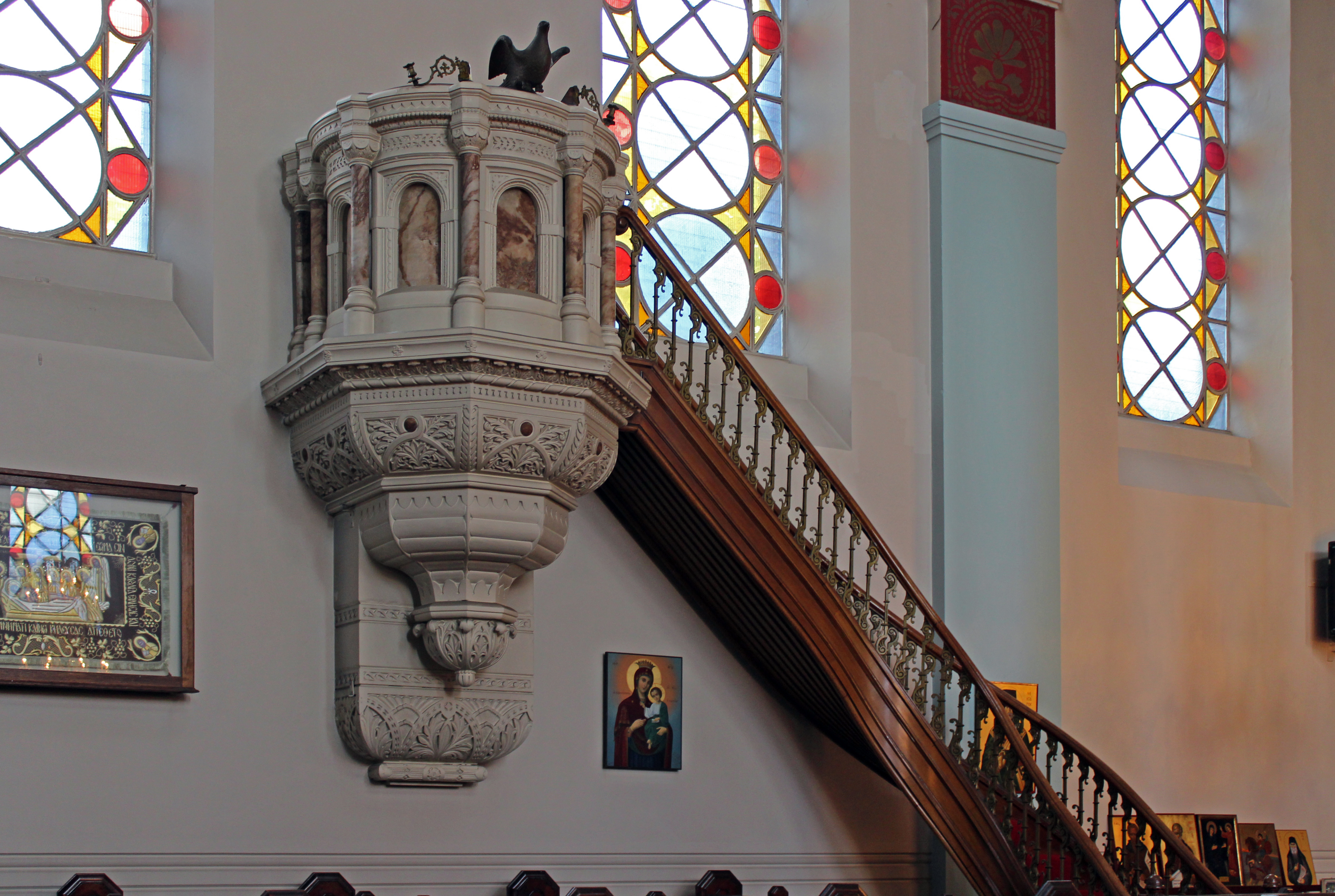
Pulpit, halfway up the wall of the north aisle

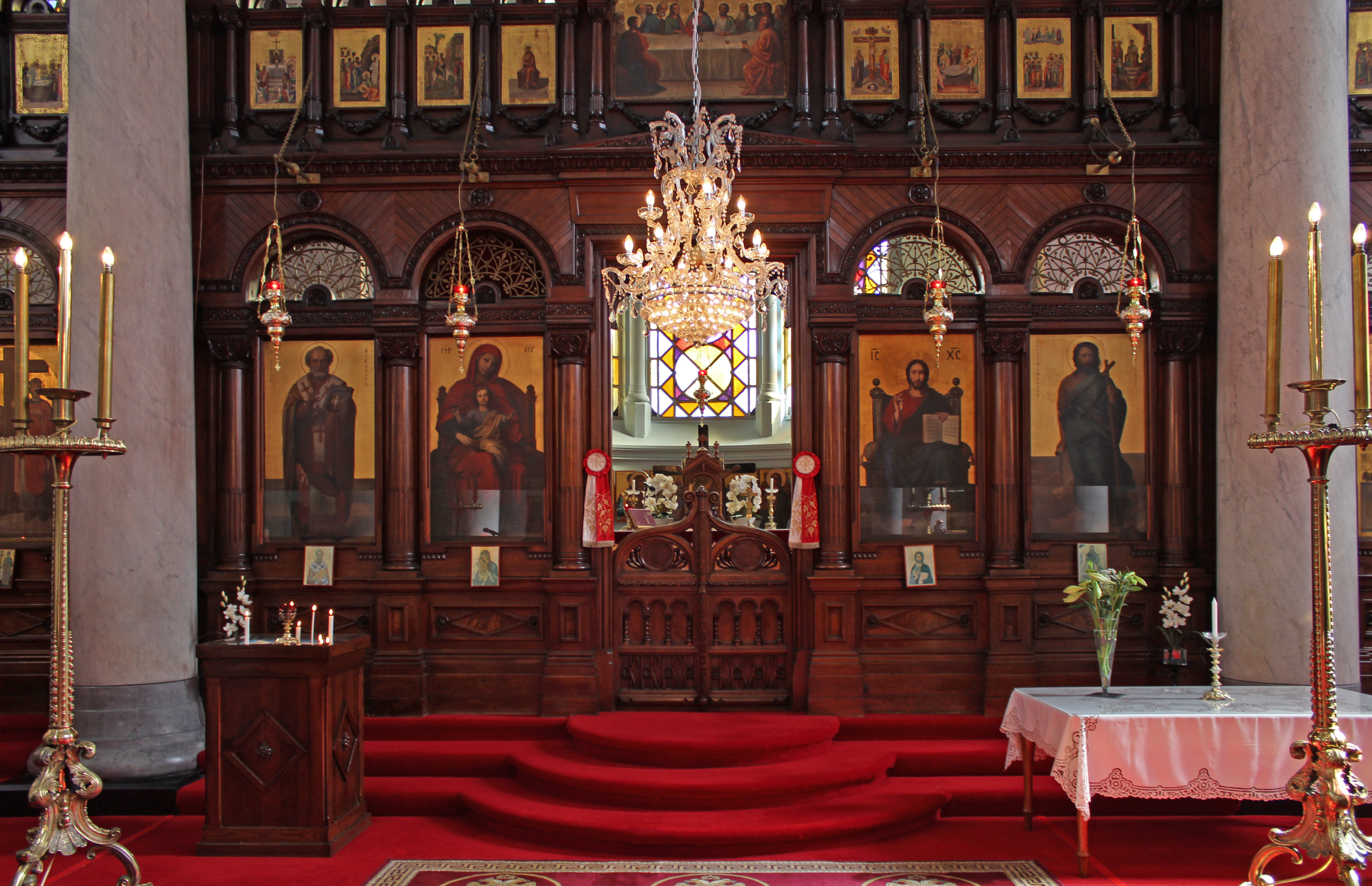
Central portion of the iconostasis or screen, showing the Beautiful Doors

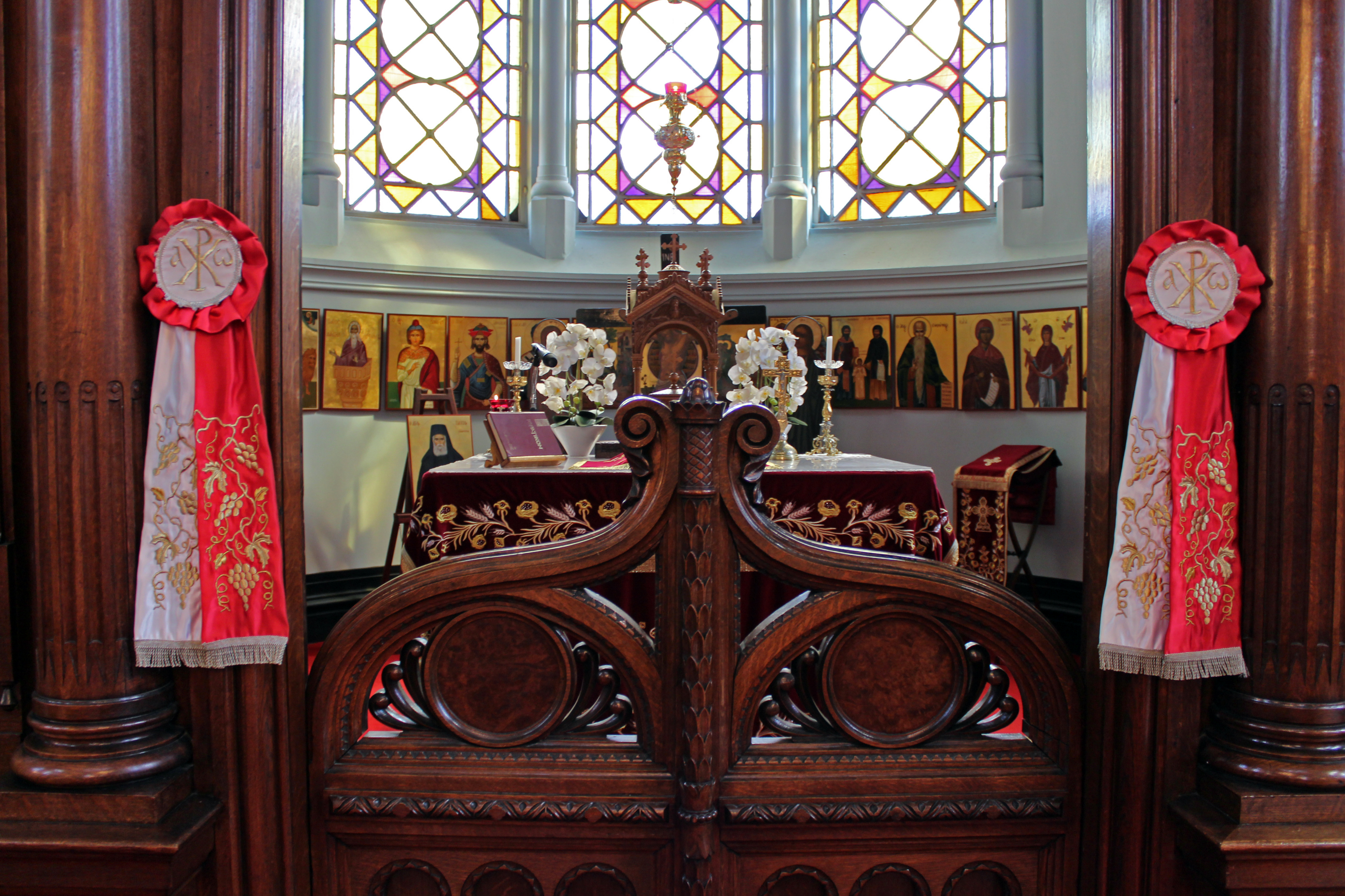
Sanctuary beyond the Beautiful Doors

== See also ==
- Religion in the United Kingdom
- Eastern Orthodoxy
- Architecture of Liverpool
- List of extant works by Culshaw and Sumners
