= Church of Our Lady and St Nicholas, Liverpool =

Liverpool Parish Church
- Church of Our Lady and Saint Nicholas
- St Nick's or The Sailors' Church
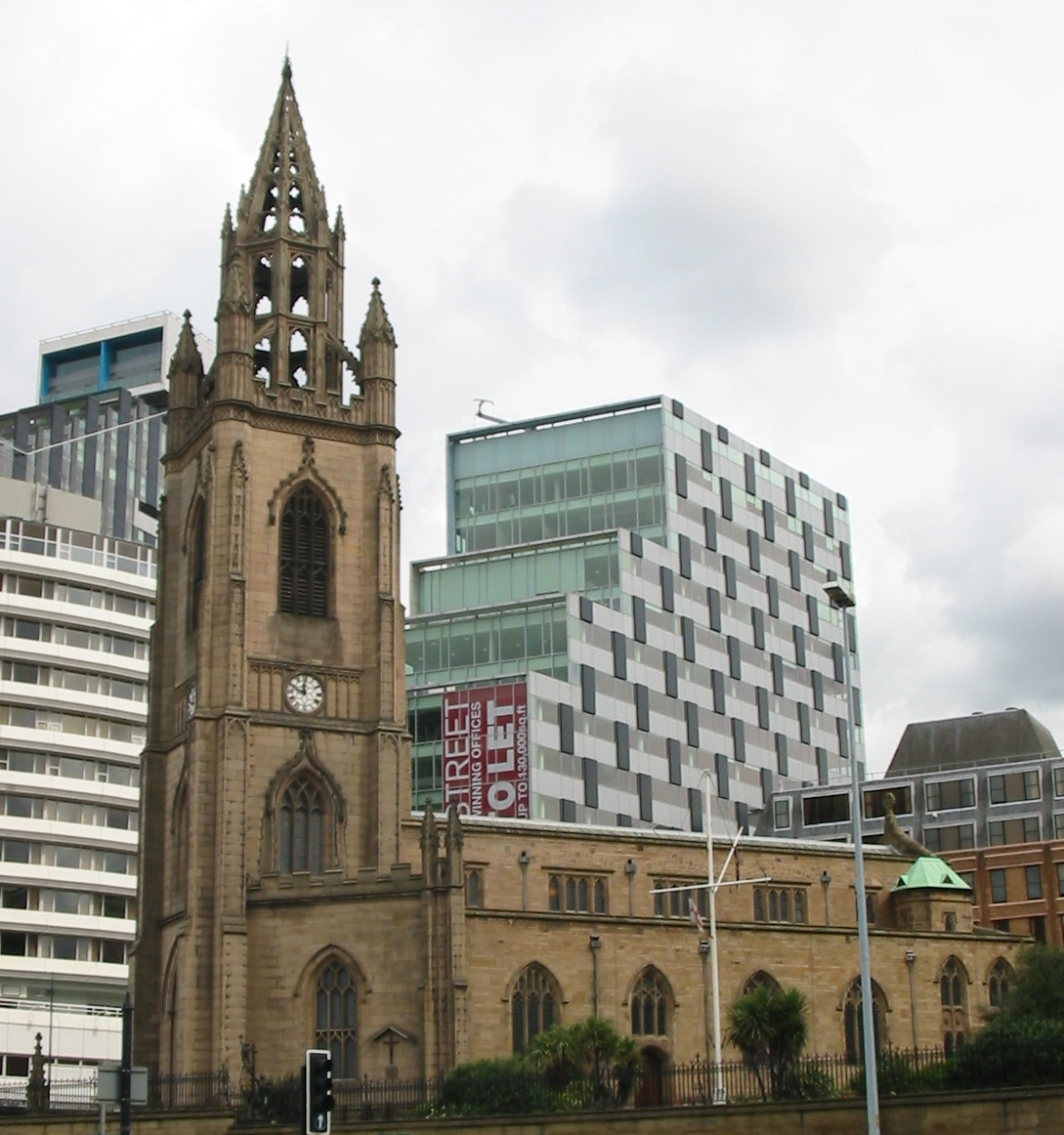
- The Church of Our Lady and Saint Nicholas

- Location within Merseyside
- 53.4070°N 2.9948°W
- OS grid reference: SJ 33959 90485
- Location: Chapel Street, Liverpool
- Country: England
- Denomination: Church of England
- Churchmanship: Modern Catholic
- Website: www.livpc.co.uk

History
- Consecrated: 1952 (current church)

Architecture
- Architect(s): Edward C. Butler (church); Thomas Harrison (tower)
- Years built: 1811 (tower); March 1949 (church)
- Completed: 1815 (tower); 1952 (church)

Administration
- Province: Province of York
- Diocese: Liverpool Diocese
- Archdeaconry: Liverpool
- Deanery: North Liverpool
- Parish: Liverpool

Clergy
- Rector: Revd. Dr. Philip Anderson

The Church of Our Lady and Saint Nicholas is the Anglican parish church of Liverpool. The site is said to have been a place of worship since at least the 1250s. The church is situated close to the River Mersey near the Pier Head. The Chapel of St Nicholas (Patron Saint of Sailors) was built on the site of St Mary del Quay, which in 1355 was determined to be too small for the growing borough of Liverpool. It is recorded in the National Heritage List for England as a designated Grade II listed building, and is an active parish church in the diocese of Liverpool, the archdeaconry of Liverpool and the deanery of Liverpool North. It is part of the Greater Churches Group. From 1813 to 1868 the church was the tallest building in Liverpool at 174 feet [53 m], but then surpassed by the Welsh Presbyterian Church in Toxteth.

== St Mary del Quay ==
In 1207 Liverpool received its charter from King John. By the 1250s a small stone chapel known as St Mary del Quay had been built (the first place of worship on the current site of the church). It probably stood near the site of the present tower, overlooking a quay on the River Mersey. The chapel was used as the main centre of worship until 1355. A new chapel dedicated to St Mary and St Nicholas was built on land granted to the burgesses by the Duke of Lancaster. It was under construction for more than a century.

In 1361 a plague hit the town and the Bishop of Lichfield and Coventry licensed the burial ground. The chapel was consecrated the following year. By the late 15th century, a north aisle, the same size as the original nave, had been added, and three chantry altars had been established. Each chantry had its own priest paid for by a wealthy patron. In 1515 a fourth chantry was built.

== Reformation and beyond ==
During the English Reformation, the chantries were abolished. The building was adapted in stages to suit the form of worship found in the Book of Common Prayer. Between 1673 and 1718, the building was extended piecemeal, and galleries were built to seat the increasing population of Liverpool. A spire was added in 1746.

In 1699 Liverpool, now with a population of about 5,000 people, was created an independent parish with (unusually) two parish churches and two rectors. Our Lady and St Nicholas (the "Old Church" or St Nicks) and the new parish church of St Peter's were established as the parish churches. An inventory of the church's goods was taken every Eastertide from 1681 to 1794 and again in 1893 for both churches. In 1775, the parish decided to rebuild the walls of the existing church. The galleries were kept, as the congregation paid pew rents. A new roof was set atop classical columns, which rested on medieval bases. The reconstructed church had walls four feet longer than the original structure.

By the year 1865, there were 27 churches in the parish, serving around 275,000 people. Since 1916 Our Lady and St Nicholas has been the Parish Church of Liverpool. St Peter's, which was situated in Church Street, was demolished in 1922, having served as pro-cathedral for the Anglican Diocese of Liverpool.

== Fatal accident ==
Over the years, as new churches were built, the "Old Church" continued to serve a congregation. Members repeatedly warned officials that the spire was unsafe. On Sunday 11 February 1810, as the bells rang and people were gathering for the morning service, the spire crashed into the nave below, killing 25 people. Twenty-one were under 15 years old, and most were girls from Moorfields Charity School. The original ring of six bells, dating from 1636 to 1724, was destroyed in the disaster. An eyewitness account is found in Stonehouse's Recollections of Old Liverpool.

Between 1811 and 1815, a new tower and lantern were built at the north side of the church. The tower was designed by Thomas Harrison of Chester. The last remains of the original chapel of St Mary del Quay, which had been used as a tavern, were demolished. Within the tower, a new ring of 12 bells was installed, cast by Dobson of Downham Market. The Tenor bell was recast by Warners in 1912.

Over the years, several small changes were made to the church for liturgical reasons. The most notable changes occurred between 1851 and 1852. The Parish Centre was built in the 1920s to accommodate community life and a church school. Apart from these changes, the church remained the same between 1815 and 1940.

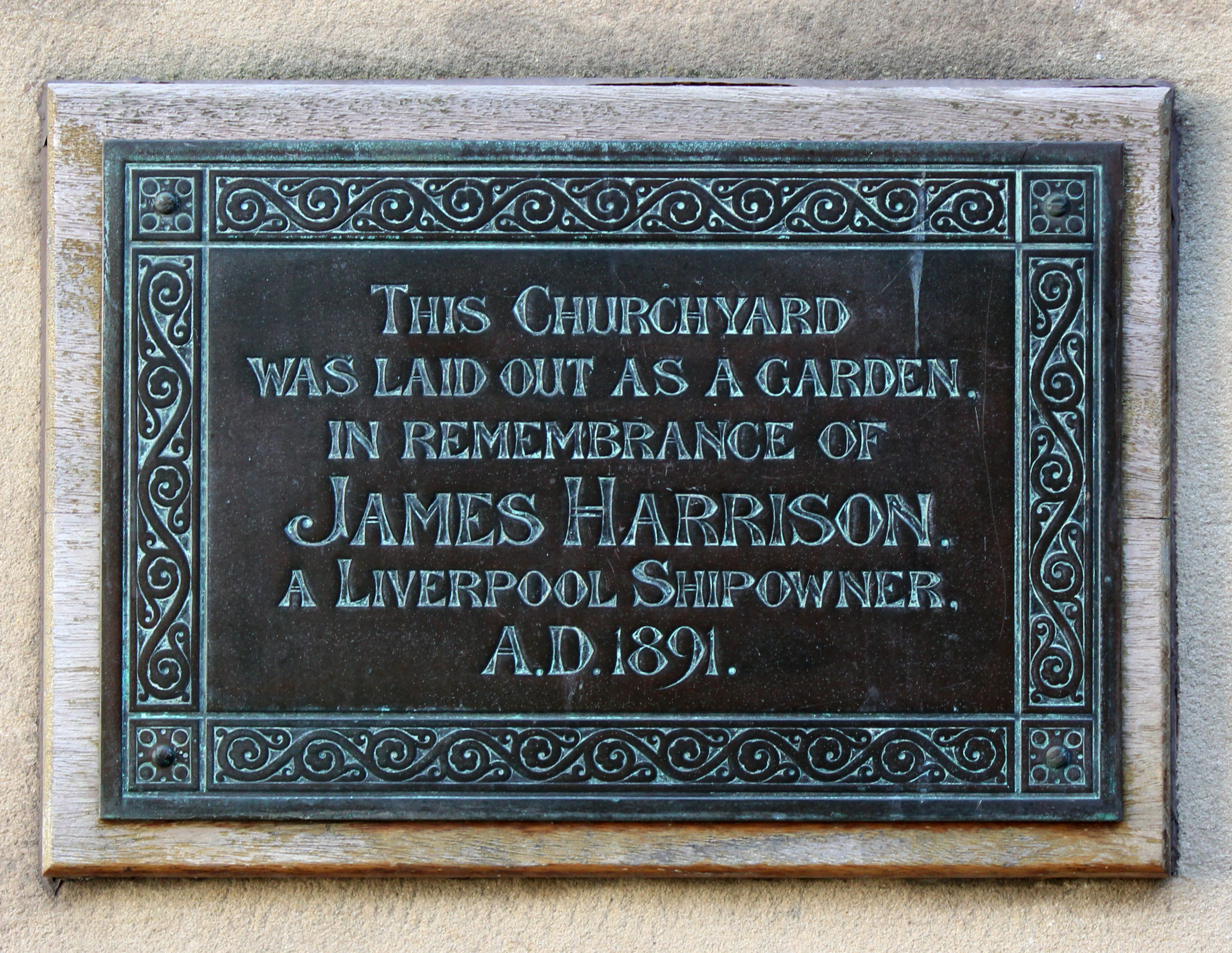
The plaque in memory of James Harrison

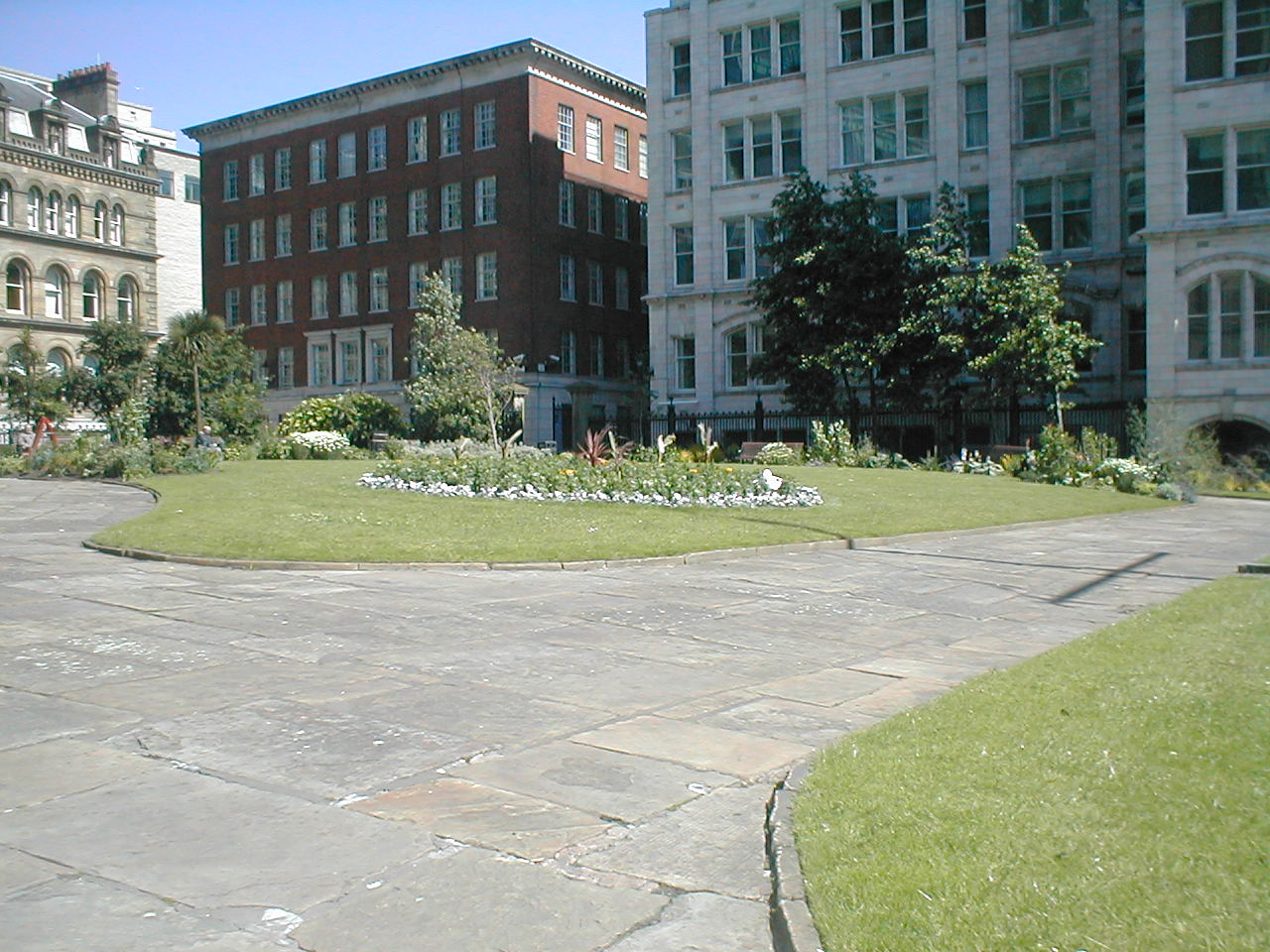
The gardens in the grounds of the church

== Closure and transformation of the churchyard ==
The churchyard used to be surrounded by walls. From 1758 to 1772, a battery of guns stood on an area of the burial ground (now covered by road) to defend the river. Until 1767, when Georges Dock was built where the Liver Building now stands, the River Mersey reached the church garden walls at high tide. In 1849 the churchyard was closed to burials. In 1891 it was transformed into a public garden in memory of James Harrison, whose shipping company had its offices facing the churchyard until the early 21st century.

== Destruction and rebuilding of the church ==
During World War II, the bells were removed for safety, but they were never rehung. Following a German air raid on 21 December 1940, the main body of the church was destroyed by fire, leaving only the parish rooms, vestries and the 19th-century tower. Rebuilding did not begin until March 1949, and the completed church, dedicated to 'Our Lady and St Nicholas', was consecrated on 18 October 1952 (the Feast of St Luke). A new ring of 12 bells was cast by John Taylor and Co. of Loughborough.

The new church was designed by architect Edward C. Butler, who introduced major changes to its design. Rather than the traditional practice of placing the altar at the east end (for the light of the rising sun and to signify the Resurrection), Butler placed it at the western end of the church.

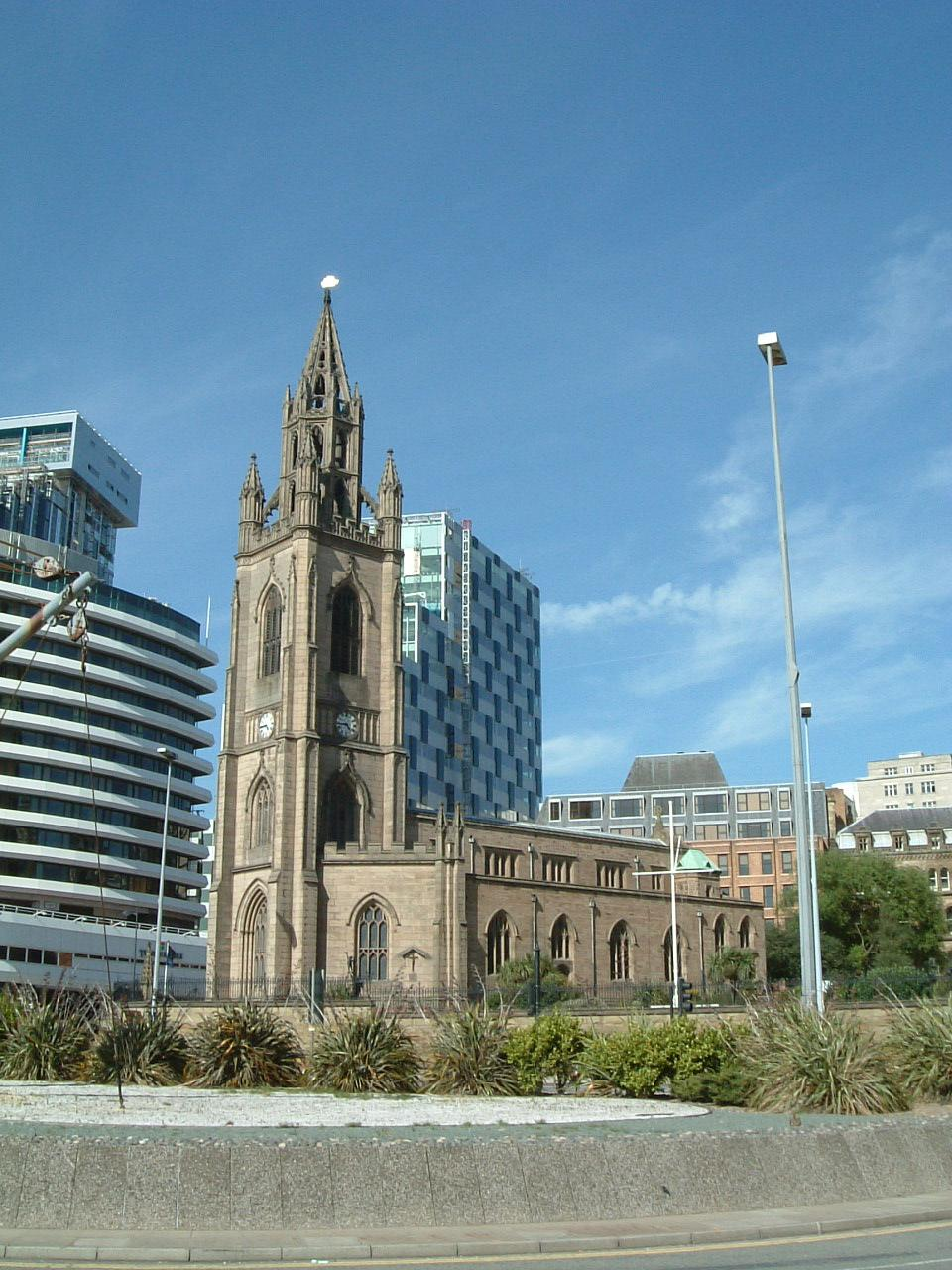
Pier Head church from the south-west.

Unlike churches in which the pulpit is traditionally the most prominent feature, Butler emphasised the sanctuary. He excluded the galleries, which had helped seat the historically large congregations. This decision reflected the smaller contemporary congregations. The nave was designed as 46 ft (14m) taller in the new church. The positions of the organ and Refectory were changed; situated above the Narthex (entrance vestibule), they reduced the seating space within the church.

== Exterior and interior detailing ==
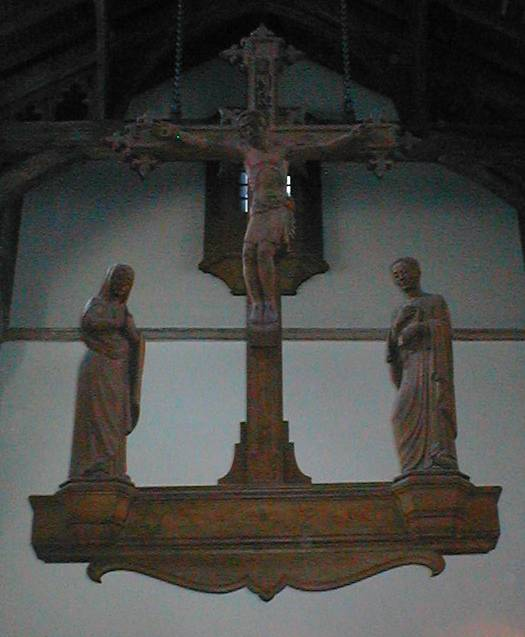
The Rood, hanging above the altar

The exterior of the church is notable for its distinctive lantern spire, which can be easily spotted from the river, despite being overshadowed by many taller buildings of the city's business district. The nave and the sanctuary house fixed woodwork carved with the vine as the dominant motif, referencing Christ: "I am the vine, you are the branches". In the southeast corner of the church is a stained glass window: Our Lady stands in glory as in Revelation and St Nicholas holds a ship. An inscription reads: "For the Healing of the Nations". A war memorial for the Cunard Steamship Company, placed in the church in 1989, is in the north east corner. The church organ is by Rushworth and Dreaper of Liverpool, and is dedicated to the memory of Charles W. Bridson, organist 1902–1949. Hanging between the nave and the sanctuary is the Rood, a figure of Christ with Our Lady and St John. The Rood is carved from the old oak bell frame from the tower.

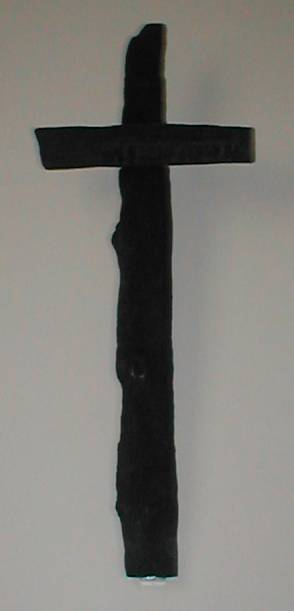
Charred timbers from the old church form the cross in the Chapel of St Peter

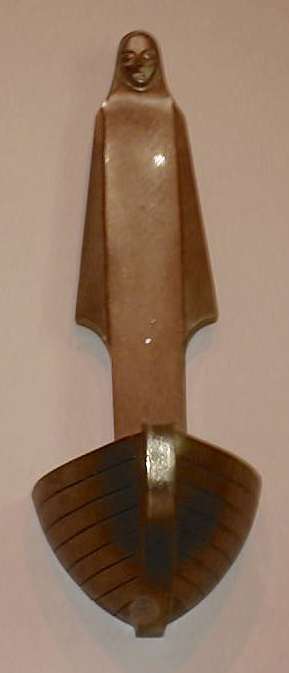
Bronze statue of Our Lady standing on the prow of a boat

The church was rebuilt with one chapel to the north of the sanctuary and another to the south. On the south is the chapel of St Peter, commemorating the old co-parish church of St Peter's, which stood on Church Street. The 18th-century wooden table was once the altar there. The Sacrament is reserved here, and the chapel is used for weekday Communion services. Charred timbers from the old church were used to form the cross on the wall.

The chapel to the north was that of St George, commemorating the former, nearby church of that dedication demolished to make way for the Queen Victoria monument at the head of Castle Street. This commemoration of two historic churches was disturbed by the introduction of a new dedication for this chapel in 1993. In that year the Maritime Chapel of St Mary del Quay was dedicated as part of the celebrations for the 50th anniversary of the Battle of the Atlantic. It memorialises the medieval shrine. A statue of Our Lady, cast in bronze, is shown standing in the prow of a boat. The statue was created by Liverpool artist Arthur Dooley. The furnishings in the chapel are by Robin McGhie. The chapel contains a Book of Remembrance, listing the names of mariners lost at sea.

Behind the church's high altar is an icon of the crucifixion painted by the Romanian artist Tatiana Nichita, donated in commemoration of Merseyside Police Constable Neil Doyle, who was murdered in Liverpool city centre while off-duty, and whose funeral took place at the church.

The church is linked to the famous phrase, "I'll be waiting till Dick docks", meaning "I'll be waiting a long time". This refers to the ship the Richard Donnelly, which is said to have sunk in Liverpool Bay. Another version of this phrase is used when an unlikely promise is made; "I'll repay that loan soon!" "Oh, yes – when Donnelly docks!" implying that the action is never going to happen. A gilded copper weather vane in the form of the ship is on top of the tower of St Nicholas'. The weather vane measures 4 ft 4 (1.3m).

The vane probably survived the fall of the tower in 1810. It was renovated before re-erection; the sails are dated 1815. Historic photos show ships as weather vanes on the Bluecoat Hospital and one of the Goree warehouses. The vane was added to the church in 1746 when the spire was built on the tower. The illustration in Enfield's History of Liverpool 1773 clearly shows the ship.

Despite the traditions, no record of a Liverpool ship named Donnely or Richard Donnelly has been found. This has been confirmed by Mr Tibble, Director of the Liverpool Maritime Museum. Unfortunately for local mythology, there is some serious misunderstanding about the weather vane.

== See also ==
- Architecture of Liverpool
- List of works by Thomas Harrison

Records
Preceded by	Tallest Building in Liverpool; 1813 – 1868	Succeeded by Welsh Presbyterian Church
