= Jack Audsley =

Australian rules footballer

Personal information
- Full name: John Donald Audsley
- Born: 24 October 1892; Geelong, Victoria
- Died: 24 December 1942 (aged 50); Geelong, Victoria
- Original team: East Geelong
- Height: 171 cm (5 ft 7 in)
- Weight: 65 kg (143 lb)

Playing career^{1}
Years	Club	Games (Goals)
1915	Geelong	2 (0)
- ^{1} Playing statistics correct to the end of 1915.

John Donald Audsley (24 October 1892 – 24 December 1942) was an Australian rules footballer who played with Geelong in the Victorian Football League (VFL).

After his brief football career Audsley served in Egypt, Belgium and France during World War I, being wounded twice and suffering trench fever and influenza.
