= Princes Road (Liverpool) =

Street in Toxteth, Liverpool, England

Coordinates: 53.3934°N 2.9620°W

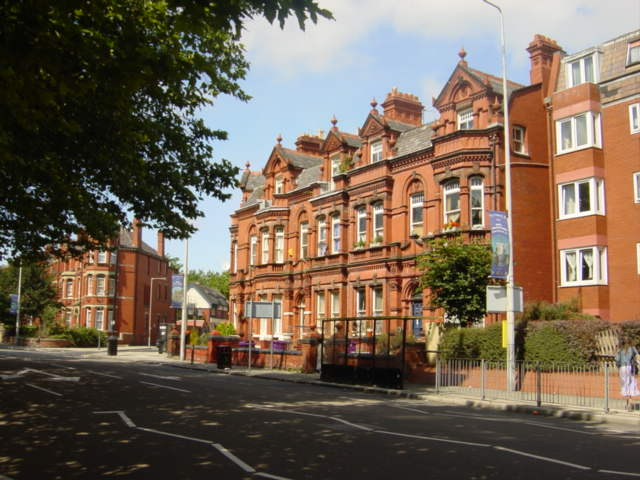
Terrace of houses, Princes Avenue, opposite Princes Rd

Princes Road is a street in Toxteth, Liverpool, England. It runs from a traffic circle at the northern extremity of Princes Park where Croxteth, Devonshire, and Kingsley Roads join, northwest about one kilometre to Upper Parliament Street. It is paralleled along most of its length by Princes Avenue, with a tree-lined strip between them, where there were formerly tram rails.

In Liverpool's nineteenth-century heyday, Princes Road was a grand avenue of merchants' houses, some of which have since fallen into disrepair or been demolished.

== Places on Princes Road ==
- Welsh Presbyterian Church. This imposing Gothic Revival structure was once the tallest building in Liverpool. Architect: Audsley Brothers. Opened: 1868. Status: Grade II listed building.
- Princes Road Synagogue, an eclectic combination of Gothic Revival and Moorish Revival architecture which the architectural historian H. A. Meek called "stunning". Architect: Audsley Brothers. Opened: 1874. Status: Grade I listed building.
- Greek Orthodox Church of St Nicholas, an ornate Neo-Byzantine church on Berkley St, backing onto Prince's Road. Architect: W. & J. Hay. Built: 1870. Status: Grade II listed building.
