= Welsh Presbyterian Church, Chester =

Grade II listed church in Chester, UK

Coordinates: 53.1902°N 2.8876°W

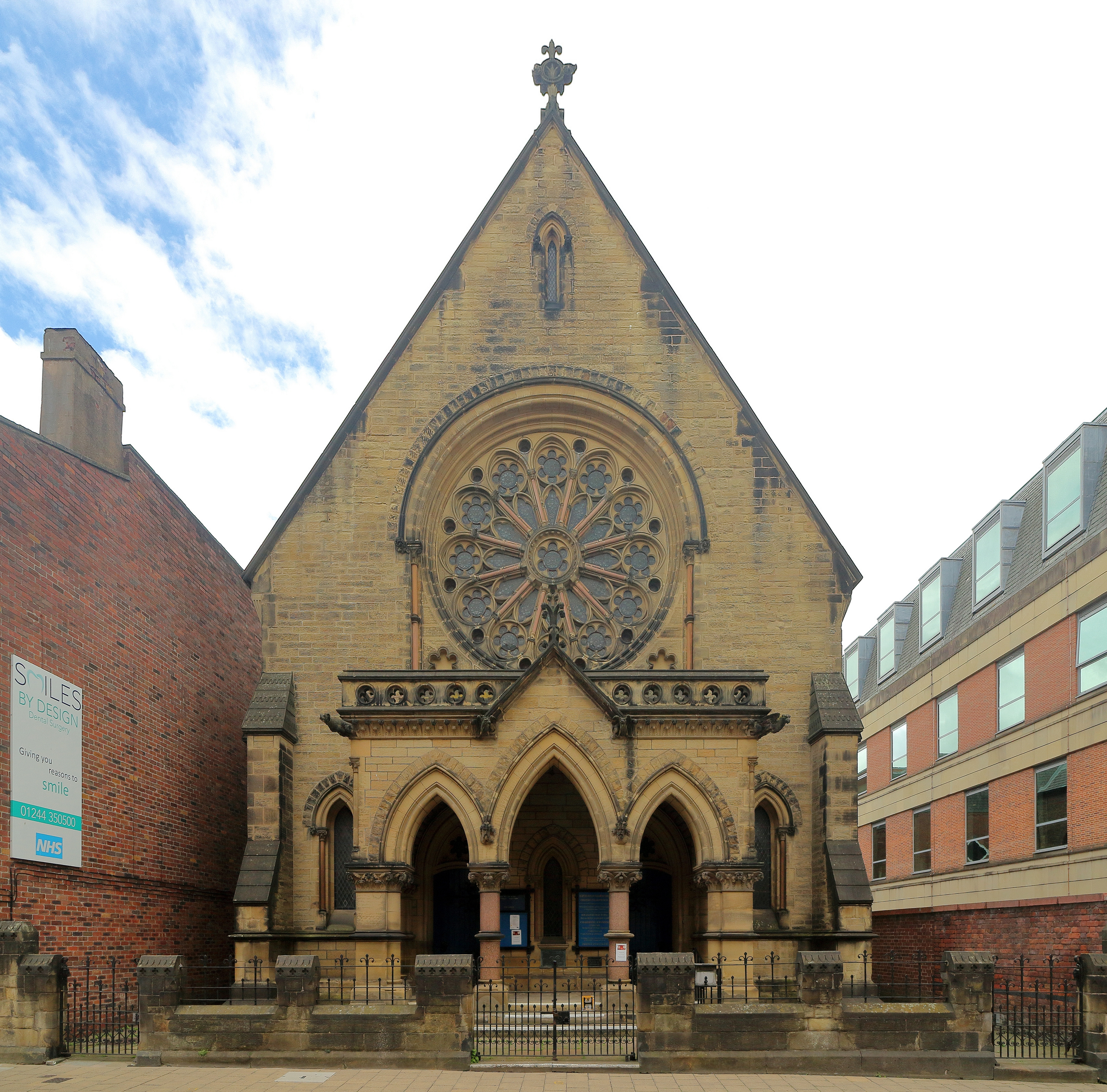
Welsh Presbyterian Church, Chester

The Welsh Presbyterian Church is in St John Street, Chester, Cheshire, England. The church was built in 1866, and designed by W. & G. Audsley of Liverpool. It is constructed with a yellow sandstone front, brick sides and rear, and a slate roof. The plan consists of a simple rectangle, with an apse at the east end, and a narrower single-storey narthex at the west (entrance) end. The narthex is supported by octagonal piers at the corners and two granite columns between them. On each side of the narthex is a lancet window. Above the narthex is a large rose window, with a lancet window above, and a cross finial on the gable. The church is recorded in the National Heritage List for England as a designated Grade II listed building. The wall and the iron railings and gates in front of the church are included in the listing.

== See also ==
- Grade II listed buildings in Chester (east)
