= William Audsley =

Scottish architect and doctor

William James Audsley (1833–1907) was an architect and a medical doctor of Scottish descent.

== Life ==
William James Audsley was born in 1833 in Dufftown, Scotland. William James Audsley and his business partner (and brother) George Ashdown Audsley, first lived in Liverpool, running W. & G. Audsley – an architectural firm based in Liverpool, UK. William started living in New York City from 1892.

== See also ==
- W. & G. Audsley
