= George Ashdown Audsley =

British-American architect, decorator, organ builder (1838–1925)

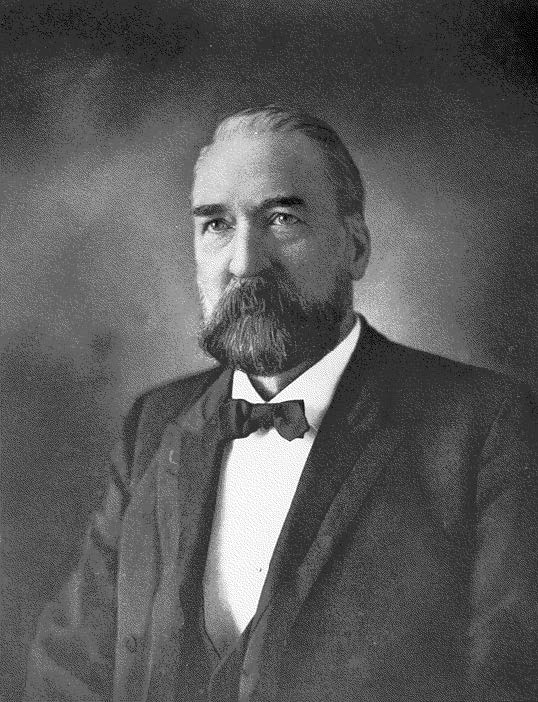
- George Ashdown Audsley in 1905
- Born: George Ashdown Audsley; 6 September 1838
- Died: 21 June 1925 (aged 86)

George Ashdown Audsley (September 6, 1838 – June 21, 1925) was an accomplished architect, artist, illustrator, writer, decorator and pipe organ designer who excelled in many artistic fields but is perhaps best known today for having designed the Wanamaker Organ in Philadelphia.

== Life ==
Born September 6, 1838, in Elgin, Scotland, Audsley apprenticed with A. & W. Reid, architects there. In 1856, he followed his older brother, William James Audsley to Liverpool, England, and was employed by architect John Weightman. By 1860, Audsley & Co., architects and makers of mounts and passe-partout, was established. The firm was eventually named W. & G. Audsley and completed ten churches in the Gothic Revival Style in the Liverpool area. An eclectic style was used for synagogues built in Liverpool and London. The firm's secular buildings, such as the Layton Art Gallery in Milwaukee, WI, USA, closely followed the style of Alexander Thomson (1817-1875), featuring Greek, Egyptian and Hindu motifs.

Audsley and his brother authored lavishly illustrated books on ornament and Japanese art, as well as personally illuminated versions of great literature.

In 1875 Audsley collaborated with his friend James Lord Bowes, a wealthy Liverpool Wool Merchant and collector of Japanese art, to produce The Keramic Art of Japan. This was one of the first and most important books on Japanese art to be produced in the English language and, like many of Audsley's works, it continues to be a popular classic publication still in print.

By 1884, the brothers apparently separated, with William emigrating to the United States and George relocating to a London suburb where he had built a house complete with a music room and a pipe organ he designed himself that was admired by Saint-Saëns and others. The move to London seems to have been occasioned by Audsley's success with the New West End Synagogue there (a masterpiece of Victorian architecture and furnishing), but further architectural commissions in the London area failed to materialize. While there, he appears to have been financially unsuccessful in establishing himself as a pipe-organ designer and author of artistic books. He emigrated to the United States, settling in the New York City area in around 1890.

The firm of W. & G. Audsley was revived and was commissioned to design the Bowling Green Offices (completed 1896), the largest office building erected in New York City to that time. Two Catholic schools, a chapel in Brooklyn, NY, a library in Norwalk, CT, and a church in Philadelphia, PA, were also designed by the firm.

== Pipe Organs ==
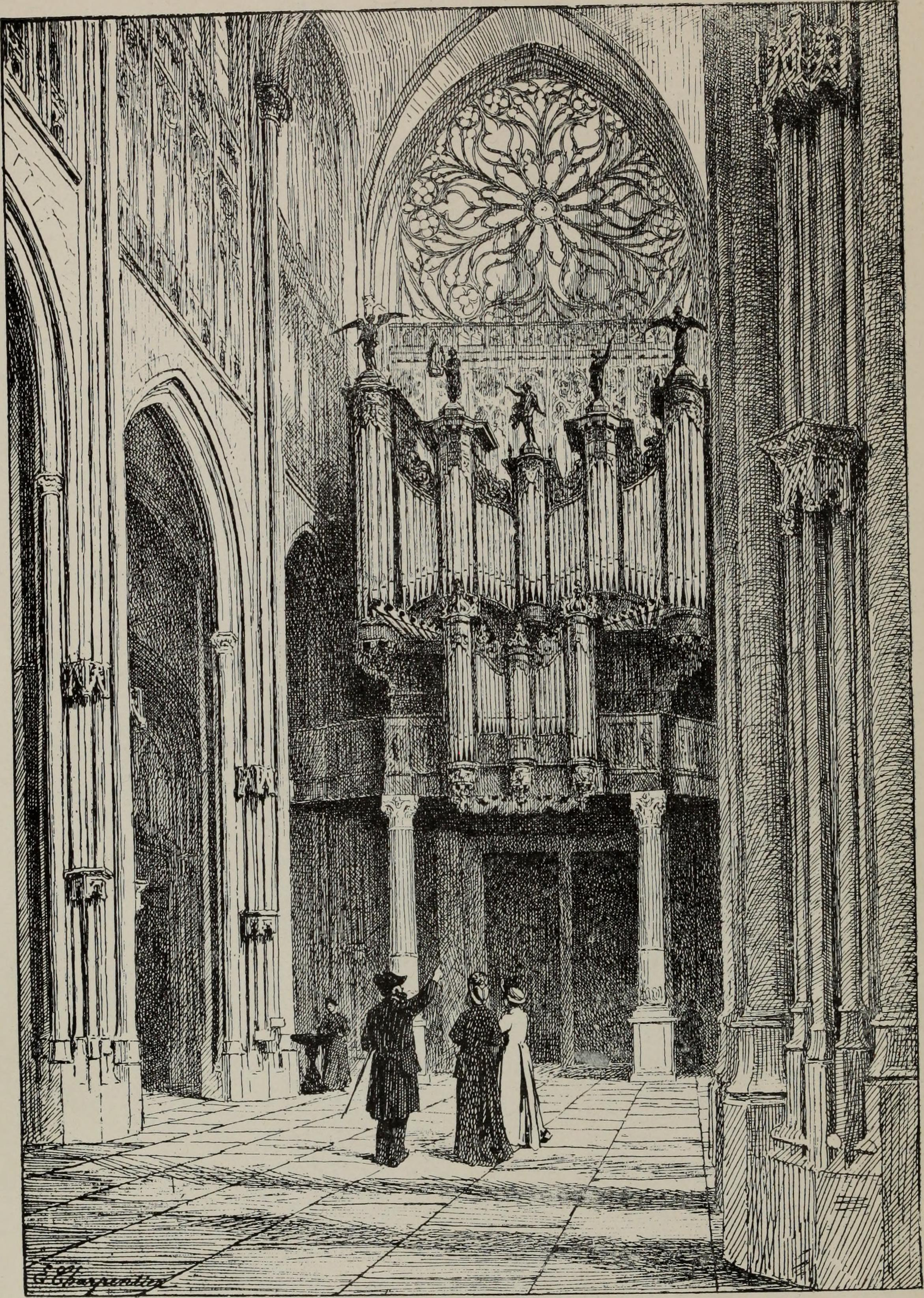
Illustration from Organ-stops and their artistic registration - names, forms, construction, tonalities, and offices in scientific combination (1921) by George Ashdown Audsley

Audsley's interest in the pipe organ was largely sparked by early experiences hearing W. T. Best at St. George's Hall, Liverpool. Audsley wrote numerous magazine articles on the organ, and as early as the 1880s was envisioning huge instruments with numerous divisions each under separate expression, in imitation of the symphony orchestra. The Los Angeles Art Organ Co. (successors to the Murray M. Harris Organ Company) had Audsley design the world's largest organ they were exhibiting at the St. Louis Exposition of 1904, and included him on the paid staff. This instrument was produced just as his book on The Art of Organ-Building was being published. This great pipe organ eventually was purchased for the John Wanamaker Store in Philadelphia, PA, where it is today known as the Wanamaker Organ. In 1905, Audsley published the monumental two-volume The Art of Organ Building as an attempt to position himself as the pre-eminent organ designer in the US. The lavish work includes numerous superb drawings done by Audsley and is still consulted today although organ fashions have evolved in many directions in the ever-fluid, passion-driven world of music. He was an early advocate of console standardization and radiating concave pedal keyboards to accommodate the natural movement of human legs. Unfortunately, his plan to develop the profession of "organ architect" as a consultant to work in consultation with major builders in achieving a high-art product was short-lived. Few commissions for pipe organs or buildings came his way, and few organs were built to high-art standards. In subsequent years, he wrote several works, one of which was published posthumously, that were essentially shortened forms of his 1905 organ building book, updated to comment on controversies of the day and the rapid advances in applying electro-pneumatic actions and playing aids to the craft. The National Association of Organists (now defunct) bestowed an Audsley medal in his honor.

== Personality and Artistic Temperament ==
Audsley was dogmatic by nature and generally unwilling to compromise his ideals. In architecture he followed the teachings of John Ruskin and rejected "sham architecture" such as "miserable inch-thick plaster" imitating stone vaulting and iron columns finished to look like marble. Audsley strongly insisted on quality materials both in buildings and pipe organs. He made an important distinction in pipe-organ tone from what is musical and what is mere "musical noise." He was in the vanguard of the symphonic-organ music but also believed in fully developed principal choruses with real mixtures. He was very much his own severest critic and attention to detail is evident in every aspect of his works. He was dedicated to mid-19th century forms of architecture and rejected the Beaux Arts and subsequent movements, at perhaps much personal cost. Audsley's overarching theory of organ design has been considered either eccentric or particular to its period, and was never adopted fully by any builder, most of whom wanted to position their own work and particular inventions as the industry standard. It would be wrong, however, to say that many aspects of his writing were not influential. His urging of multiple divisions under expression proved particularly prophetic, and there is much of value in his books on his discussions of organ stops, their natures, their materials, and the relative merits of the various forms of construction possible. As an example of his eccentricity, Audsley insisted that sound was not a wave in a medium, but some kind of particle phenomenon, rejecting all the science to the contrary. It has been said that Audsley was very right when he was right, but very wrong when he was wrong. In all his achievements, however, there is excellence in execution, deep thought, profound craftsmanship and high artistry. Art is never static, and all his achievements reward patient study.

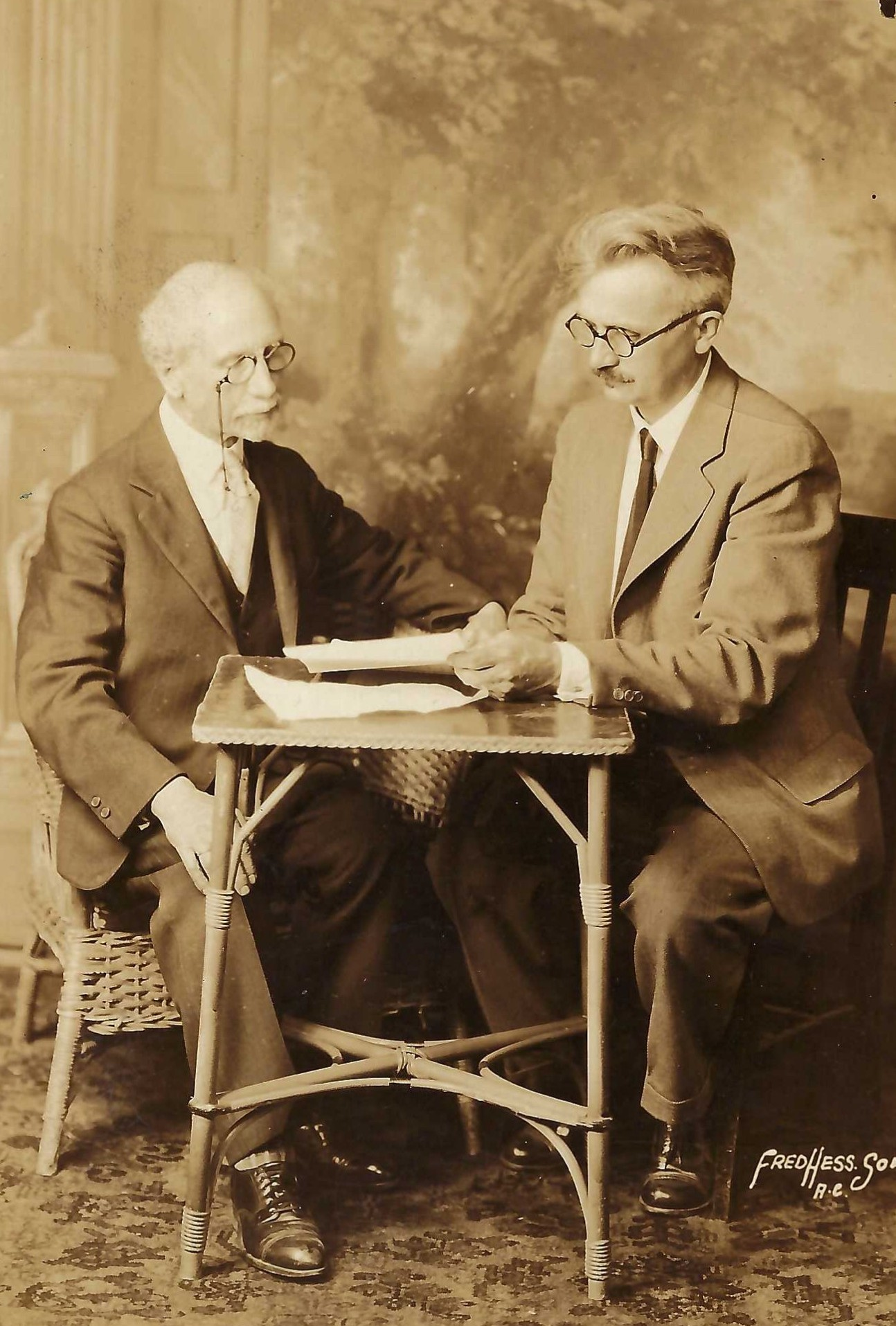
George Ashdown Audsley with fellow organ-maker Seibert Losh in the 1920s.

== Death ==
Audsley's last years were spent with little income living with his son in Bloomfield, New Jersey. He died there working on his unfinished book, The Temple of Tone, on June 21, 1925, and was buried at Mt. Hope Cemetery in Yonkers, New York.

== Audsley descendants ==
Many of Audsley's descendants pursued artistic careers. Son Berthold was a model maker whose works are preserved in a Newark Museum. Son Maurice was a skilled photographer.
