= Welsh Presbyterian Church, Liverpool =

Coordinates: 53.3938°N 2.9638°W

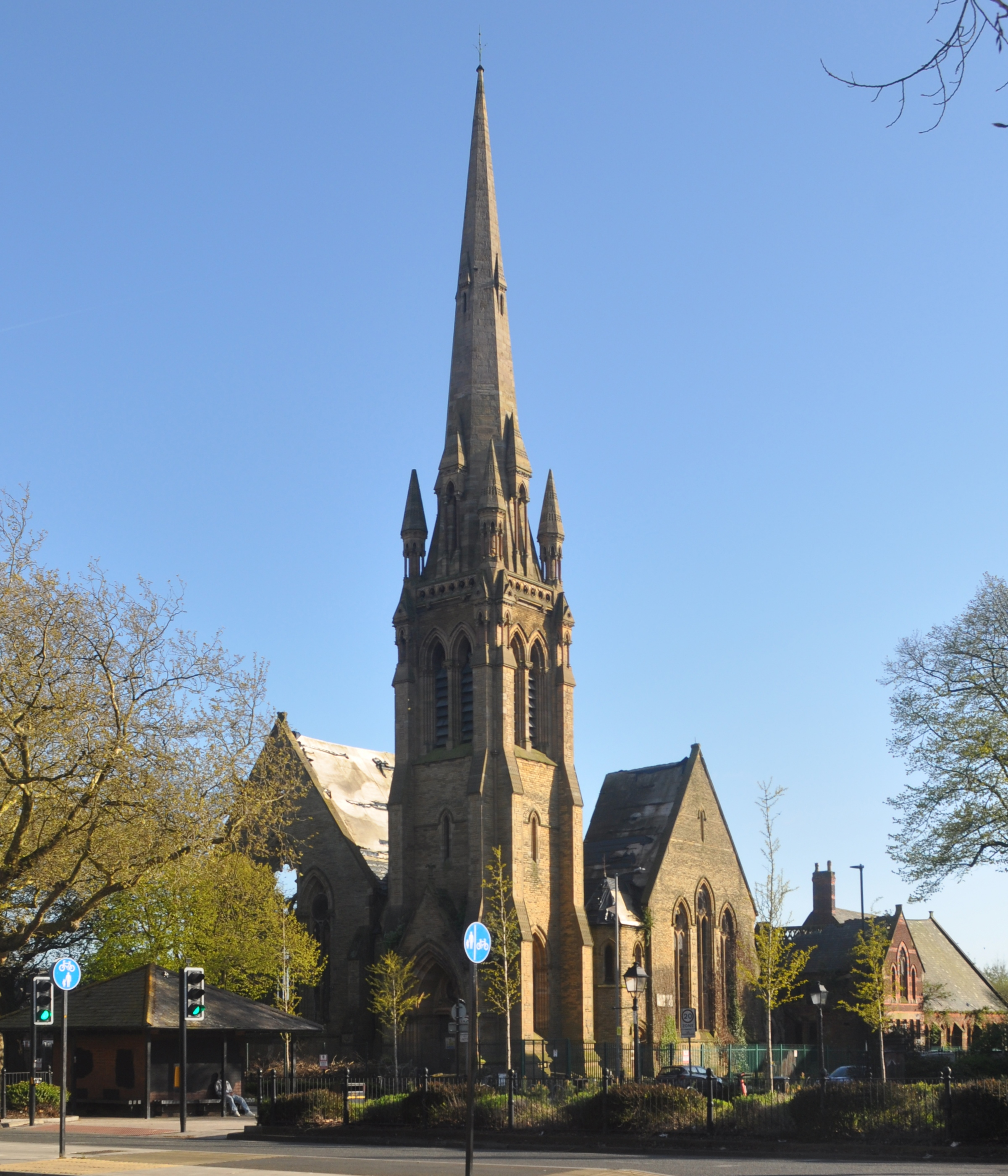
- The former church in April 2024

- Location in Liverpool
- OS grid reference: SJ 360 890
- Location: Princes Road, Liverpool, Merseyside
- Country: England
- Denomination: Presbyterian Church of Wales

Architecture
- Functional status: Redundant
- Heritage designation: Grade II
- Designated: 14 March 1975
- Architect: W. & G. Audsley
- Architectural type: Church
- Style: High Victorian Gothic
- Groundbreaking: 1865
- Completed: 1867

Specifications
- Materials: Stone, slate roof

The Welsh Presbyterian Church is a disused church on Princes Road in the Toxteth district of Liverpool, Merseyside, England. It is a redundant church of the Presbyterian Church of Wales, and is recorded in the National Heritage List for England as a designated Grade II listed building. Because of its tall steeple, the church has been nicknamed the "Welsh Cathedral", or "Toxteth Cathedral", although it was never an actual cathedral. In 2019, it received National Lottery Stage 1 funding to become a community hub after thirty years abandonment.

== History ==
The church was built between 1865 and 1867, and designed by the local architects W. & G. Audsley. At the time it was built, because of its steeple rising to a height of 200 feet (61 m), it was the highest building in Liverpool. In 1982, when it was no longer used as a Welsh Presbyterian Church, it was sold to the Brotherhood of the Cross and Star, a religious organisation with headquarters in Nigeria. They ceased to use the church in the 1990s, it became vacant, was vandalised, and became derelict. There were plans for the leasehold to be acquired by a partnership of the Merseyside Building Preservation Trust (MBPT) and the Heritage Trust for the North West. In 2013 the MBPT undertook a feasibility study with the intention to make a bid for a grant from the Heritage Lottery Fund. In 2019, almost £3 million was granted in Stage 1 funding towards transforming the building into a community hub, though the project was estimated to require upwards of £10 million. MBPT purchased the building from the council for £1. In 2021, it was estimated that, without intervention, the building would be unsalvageable within two or three years. As of March 2026, the building is still derelict.

== Naming ==
The denomination was created in 1811 and formalised in 1823 as the Welsh Calvinistic Methodists. See Welsh Methodist revival and Calvinistic Methodists. From 1928 on, the denomination was also known as the Presbyterian Church in Wales. So this church, and other buildings may be called Methodist, Calvinist or Presbyterian, but belong to the same establishment (or actually Disestablishment).

== Architecture ==
The church is constructed in rock-faced rubble, and has a patterned slate roof. It is in High Victorian Gothic style. The church consists of a nave and transepts, giving it a T-shaped plan. The tower has angle buttresses, which have niches at the top. The bell openings are paired and louvred. On top of the tower are pinnacles and a broach spire with arcading and lucarnes. Attached to the south transept is a canted stair tower. On top of the crossing is a slate flèche. Inside the church are galleries at the west end and in the transepts, which are carried on marble piers. The nave has a barrel roof supported by wall piers.

== See also ==
- Grade II listed buildings in Liverpool-L8

Records
Preceded by Church of Our Lady and Saint Nicholas Tower	Tallest Building in Liverpool; 1868 – 1907	Succeeded by Port of Liverpool Building
