= Grade I listed churches in Merseyside =

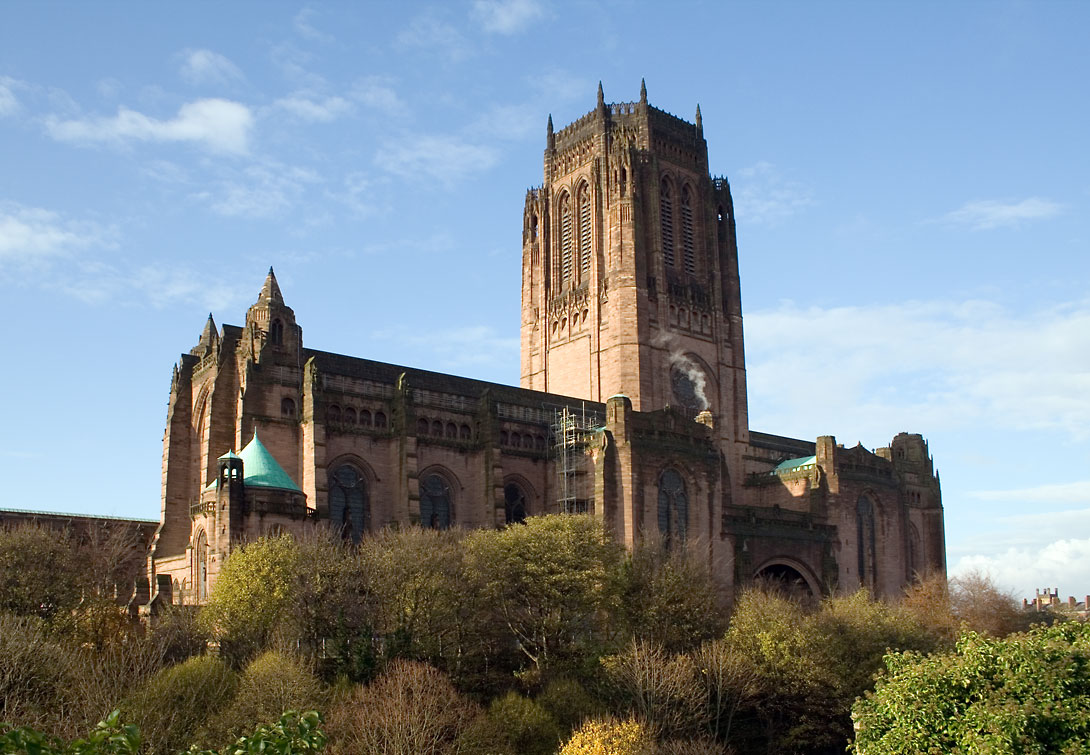
Liverpool's Anglican Cathedral

Merseyside is a metropolitan county in North West England. It was created by the Local Government Act 1972, and consists of the metropolitan boroughs of Knowsley, St Helens, Sefton, Wirral, and the city of Liverpool. Buildings are listed on the recommendation of English Heritage to the Secretary of State for Culture, Media and Sport, who makes the decision whether or not to list the structure. Grade I listed buildings are defined as being of "exceptional interest, sometimes considered to be internationally important"; only 2.5 per cent of listed buildings are included in this grade. This is a complete list of Grade I listed churches in the metropolitan county of Merseyside as recorded in the National Heritage List for England.

Christian churches have existed in Merseyside since the Anglo-Saxon era, but no significant Saxon features remain in its listed churches. The churches in this list fall principally into two groups: those originating mainly from the medieval period, which are in Gothic style, and those built during the 19th and 20th centuries, which are mainly in Gothic Revival style, with only a few churches created between those periods. Gothic churches from the medieval era include St Andrew, Bebington and All Saints, Childwall – both of which incorporate Norman material – St Mary, Prescot, and St Helen, Sefton. During the 19th century, some of the country's finest architects designed churches in Gothic Revival style. Examples include St Agnes and St Pancras, Toxteth Park, by J. Loughborough Pearson, St John the Baptist, Tuebrook, by G. F. Bodley, and All Hallows, Allerton, by G. E. Grayson. Liverpool Cathedral, designed by Giles Gilbert Scott and built during the 20th century, is also in Gothic Revival style. Chapels built between the two periods were the Ancient Chapel of Toxteth, and The Oratory by John Foster. The Oratory and the steeple of St Mary, Prescot, are the only buildings in the list in Neoclassical style. Two of the churches in the list were pioneers in the use of cast iron in their structure and decoration: St Michael, Aigburth, and St George, Everton. All the churches referred to above are Anglican. The churches in the list from other denominations are the Roman Catholic church of St Clare, Sefton Park, and Ullet Road Unitarian Church. In 2017 the Roman Catholic Church of St. Monica, Bootle, designed in Modernist style, was promoted to Grade I.

The region covered by this list was sparsely populated until the later part of the 19th century. Its largest conurbation is the city of Liverpool, a port and commercial centre. There is industry in and around Liverpool and in the town of St Helens, but the economy of much of the region is agricultural. The bedrock consists mainly of sandstone, which is the stone chiefly used for building the churches of the region. The superficial deposits are of boulder clay, which provides material for making bricks.

== Churches ==
Name	Location	Photograph	Notes
St Michael	Aigburth, Liverpool; 53.3766°N 2.9499°W	A brick tower with red decorations, including a pierced parapet and crocketed pinnacles	This church was designed by Thomas Rickman in association with the iron founder John Cragg, using cast iron parts made in Cragg's foundry. It was built in 1813–15. The skeleton is of cast iron, as are many of the decorative features, including the parapets, battlements, and pinnacles. The church is partly clad in brick and slate. Its plan consists of a six-bay nave with a clerestory, north and south aisles, a chancel, and a west tower.
All Hallows	Allerton, Liverpool; 53.3807°N 2.9035°W	A tower seen from a distance, with a clock face and pinnacles	The church was designed by G. E. Grayson for John Bibby, owner of the Bibby Line, and built in 1872–76. It is constructed in sandstone in Perpendicular style. Most of the stained glass was made by Morris & Co. to designs by Edward Burne-Jones. The church includes a mausoleum for the Bibby family.
St Andrew	Bebington, Wirral; 53.3480°N 3.0034°W	A stone church seen from the southeast, with a broach spire at the west end	A church existed on this site in the Anglo-Saxon era, but was replaced by a Norman church in the 12th century. Part of the Norman arcade is still present at the west end of the church. The tower, with its broach spire was added during the 14th century. The east end of the church was rebuilt in the 16th century in Perpendicular style. In 1846–47 the church was restored and the north aisle was added. There were further restorations in 1871–72 and in 1897.
St Monica	Bootle, Sefton; 53.4539°N 2.9797°W	A brick church with white fittings and statues of three angels on the front	A Roman Catholic church built in 1935–36 and designed by F. X. Velarde in Modernist style. It is built in brick with a green pantile roof, and consists of a nave with aisles, a chancel with a north chapel, and a broad west tower with a narthex. The buttresses on the sides rise above the roofs and are pierced by an arch. The windows are mullioned and transomed, each light being arched. On the tower, above the windows, are three angels carved by H. Tyson Smith.
All Saints	Childwall, Liverpool; 53.3953°N 2.8816°W	A sandstone church seen from the south with a west tower and a recessed spire	The chancel of All Saints dates from the 14th century, and the south aisle and porch possibly from the following century. Additions were made in the 18th century, the steeple was built in 1810–11, and the north aisle in 1833. Inside the porch is a fragment of a Saxon cross-shaft, and incorporated in the fabric of the east wall of the chancel is a Norman capital.
St George	Everton, Liverpool; 53.4253°N 2.9715°W	A church seen from the south with a west tower surmounted by a pierced parapet and pinnacles	This is the earliest of the three Liverpool churches designed by Thomas Rickman in association with the iron founder John Cragg, using cast iron parts made in Cragg's foundry. The exterior is in stone, and the church is in Perpendicular style. Almost all the stained glass was destroyed during the Second World War.
Liverpool Cathedral	Liverpool; 53.3974°N 2.9733°W	A large building on a hill with a broad central tower	The cathedral was designed by Giles Gilbert Scott, initially in collaboration with G. F. Bodley. Construction began in 1904, and the Lady chapel was completed in 1910. Building continued through much of the century; the tower was completed in 1942 and the entire building in 1978. It is constructed in red sandstone in Gothic style, and has a cruciform plan, with a large central tower at the crossing.
Liverpool Metropolitan Cathedral	Liverpool; 53.3974°N 2.9733°W	The front elevation of Liverpool Metropolitan Cathedral showing the steps rising from Hope Street and the bell tower in front of the church's spire.	The cathedral was designed by Sir Frederick Gibberd. Constructed between 1962 and 1967, it was built over an earlier crypt by Sir Edwin Luthyens. In recognition of the influence it has had over contemporary Catholic places of worship, the Cathedral was relisted from Grade II* to Grade I in June 2025.
Oratory	Liverpool; 53.3987°N 2.9732°W	A small classical temple-like style building in the shadow of the cathedral	Built in 1829 as the mortuary chapel (Note: In this context, a mortuary chapel is a small chapel in or near a cemetery where bodies in coffins are kept until the burial service is held.) to St James Cemetery, this was designed in Greek Revival style by John Foster. Inside the chapel are monuments designed by John Gibson, Francis Chantrey, and Pietro Tenerani, including a statue of William Huskisson by Gibson.
St Mary	Prescot, Knowsley; 53.4285°N 2.8063°W	A church seen from the east with a west tower surmounted by a recessed spire	The north vestry and south wall of the chancel date from the 14th century, the nave and chapel were built in 1610, the steeple was added in 1729, the aisles in 1817–19, and the south vestry in 1900. The church was restored in 1876 by W. & G. Audsley. The steeple was designed by Henry Sephton and is in Neoclassical style, but the rest of the church is Gothic. Many of the internal furnishings date from the 17th century. Also in the church are a Norman font, a reredos by C. E. Kempe, and monuments by Richard Westmacott and A. W. N. Pugin.
St Helen	Sefton; 53.5044°N 2.9712°W	A church with an embattles body, and a west tower with pierced pinnacles and a recessed spire	The oldest fabric in the present church dates from the 14th century, with fragments from the 12th-century church preserved inside. Most of the church dates from between 1489 and 1557 when members of the Molyneux family were incumbents, and is Perpendicular in style. The church was restored between 1907 and 1922 by W. D. Caröe, who also designed some of the internal furnishings. The church contains seven screens dating from the early and mid-16th century. The pulpit is dated 1635 and is decorated with close arabesque carving.
St Agnes and St Pancras	Sefton Park, Liverpool; 53.3896°N 2.9399°W	A bulky red brick church with two spirelets	Designed by J. Loughborough Pearson, the church was built in 1883–85. It is constructed in red brick with sandstone dressings in the style of the 13th century, with English and French elements. The architectural historian Nikolaus Pevsner described it as "by far the most beautiful Victorian church of Liverpool".
St Clare	Sefton Park, Liverpool; 53.3910°N 2.9367°W	A Gothic Revival church in red brick with a small tower and thin spire	This is a Roman Catholic church designed by Leonard Stokes, and built in 1889–90. The buttresses are in the interior of the church and are pierced, forming narrow passage aisles. The reredos consists of a large triptych containing painting and sculpture by Robert Anning Bell and George Frampton.
Ullet Road Unitarian Church	Sefton Park, Liverpool; 53.3899°N 2.9381°W	A red brick church with a rose window, a bellcote and a series of gabled buttresses	Built in 1896–99, the church was designed by Thomas and Percy Worthington, who also designed the attached library, vestry, and church hall. The buildings are constructed in red brick with sandstone dressings in Gothic style. The main entrance contains three beaten copper doors in Arts and Crafts style. The stained glass was designed by Edward Burne-Jones and made by Morris & Co. The choir stall canopies and the font were carved by C. J. Allen. In the vestry are ceiling paintings by Gerald Moira. The attached church hall is listed separately, also at Grade I.
Ancient Chapel of Toxteth	Toxteth, Liverpool; 53.3813°N 2.9580°W	A small chapel with round-headed windows	Initially built between 1604 and 1618, the chapel was largely rebuilt in 1774, and the porch was added in 1841. It consists of a simple rectangular box in stone with a slate roof and a small bellcote. All the pews in chapel are box pews, one of which is dated 1650, and there are galleries on three sides.
St John the Baptist	Tuebrook, Liverpool; 53.4248°N 2.9301°W	A church with bands of differently coloured stone, and a tower with a spire supported by flying buttresses	The church was built in 1867–70 to a design by G. F. Bodley, who also designed the furnishings and fittings and decorated the walls. The decorations were restored in 1968–71 by S. E. Dykes Bower. The exterior of the church is constructed in buff and red stone arranged in irregular bands, with stained glass windows designed by Edward Burne-Jones. Inside the church are painted panels by C. E. Kempe.
