= Toxteth Unitarian Chapel =

Coordinates: 53.3813°N 2.9580°W

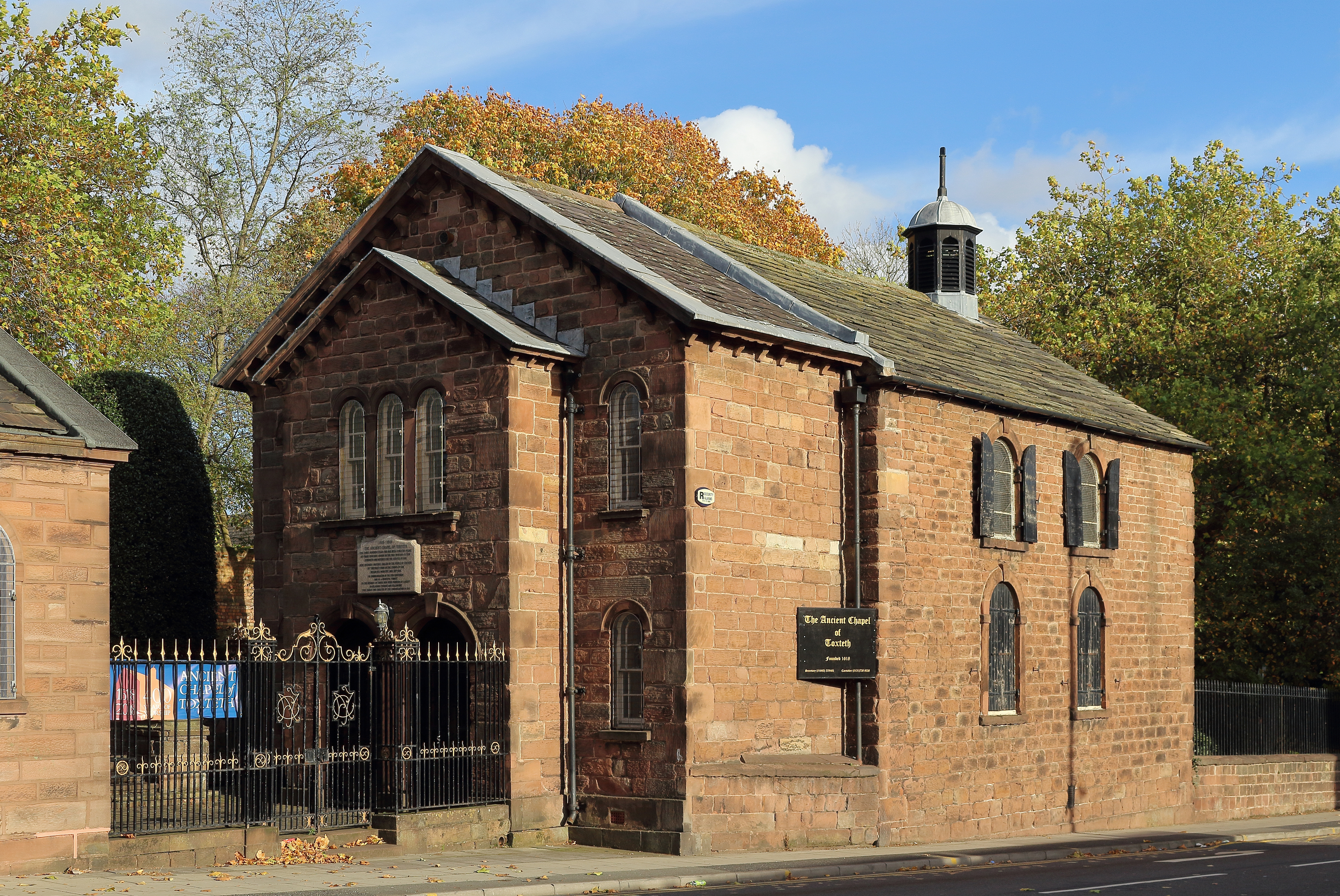
- View across Park Road

- Location in Merseyside
- OS grid reference: SJ 363 875
- Location: Dingle, Liverpool, Merseyside
- Country: England
- Denomination: Unitarian

Architecture
- Functional status: Active
- Heritage designation: Grade I
- Designated: 28 June 1952
- Architectural type: Chapel
- Groundbreaking: 1618
- Completed: 1774

Specifications
- Materials: Stone with slate roof

Toxteth Unitarian Chapel is in Park Road, Dingle, Liverpool, Merseyside, England. Since the 1830s it has been known as The Ancient Chapel of Toxteth. It is recorded in the National Heritage List for England as a designated Grade I listed building. and continues to be used as a Unitarian chapel. It is a member of the General Assembly of Unitarian and Free Christian Churches, the umbrella organisation for British Unitarians.

== History ==
In 1611 a group of Puritan farmers built a school in Toxteth and appointed Richard Mather, at the age of 15, as its master. He then went to Brasenose College, Oxford to continue his education but he was asked to return to Toxteth. By this time the chapel had been built and on 30 November 1618 he preached his first sermon. He subsequently became ordained in the Church of England. However he was suspended from the ministry in 1633 and again in 1634 because of his nonconformist preaching, and in 1635 he emigrated to America. By 1662 the minister of the chapel was a Presbyterian named Thomas Crompton and he was joined by another Dissenter, Michael Briscoe. In 1672 both ministers obtained licences under the Royal Declaration of Indulgence and the chapel was enlarged to accommodate Dissenters from central Liverpool. However as more chapels were built, Toxteth chapel was neglected and fell into disrepair. In 1774 it was partly rebuilt. Around this time the majority of the congregation were Unitarian and the others left to form a new congregation. A porch was added in 1841. Unitarian services continue to be held in the chapel every fortnight.

== Description ==
The chapel is built in stone with a slate roof. It has two storeys and a western extension with a projecting bay. The windows are round-headed with stone surrounds. At the west end are paired round-headed entrances with a commemorative plaque and three windows above them. At the south end is a small octagonal cupola with louvres and a button finial. The interior has the pulpit at the east end, galleries on three sides, and box pews throughout. The north and south galleries date from the 17th century and connecting gallery is from the 18th century. Two of the box pews are dated 1650 and 1700. The monuments include a brass dated 1656 and 18th and early 19th century wall tablets. Outside the chapel is a graveyard with a mid-19th-century classical arcade. The organ was built in 1906 by Brindley & Foster.

The chapel contains a memorial plaque dedicate to Jeremiah Horrocks, a 17th-century astronomer. Horrocks was the first person to accurately predict the transit of Venus and was a member of the chapel.

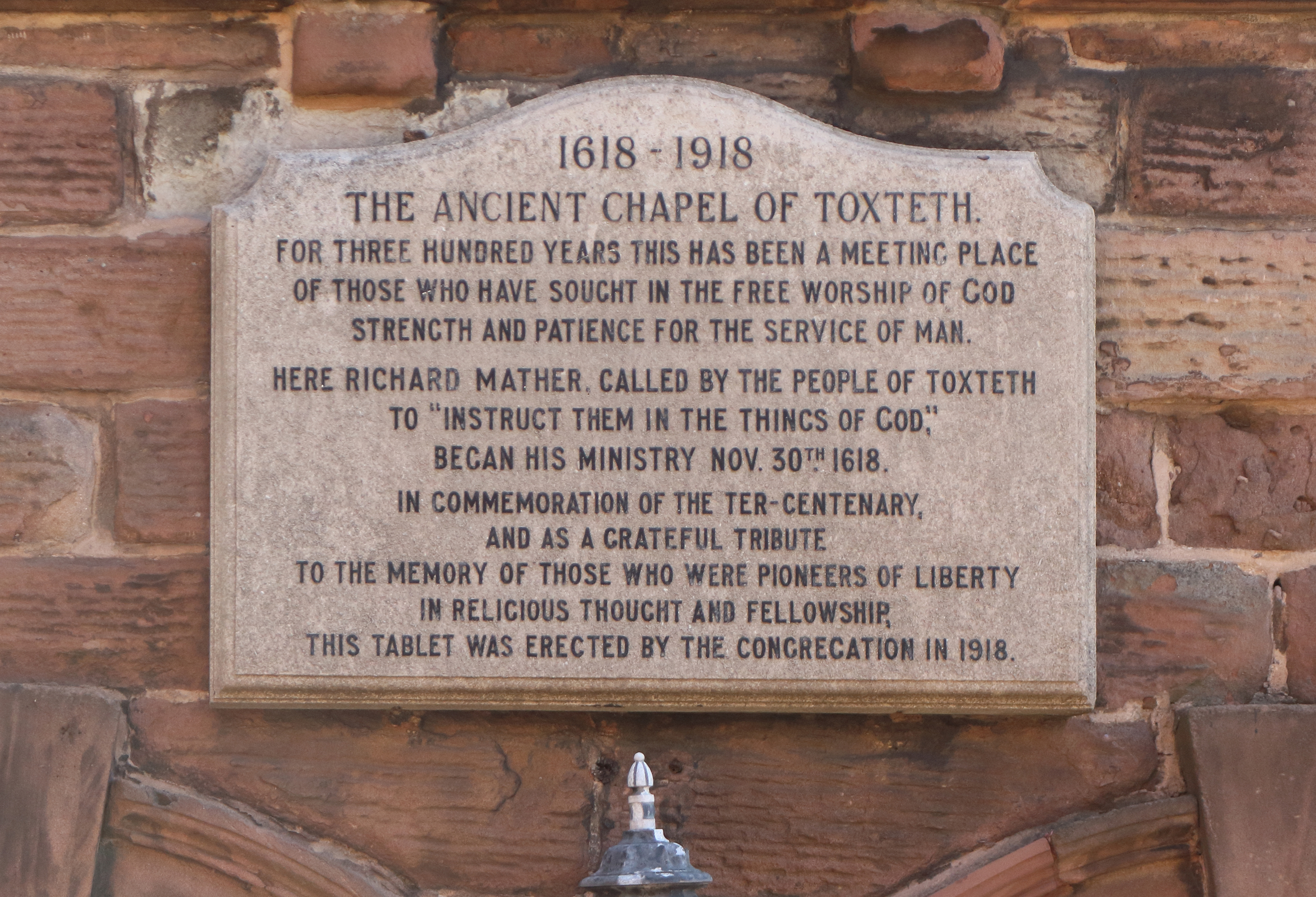
Plaque above the door of the Chapel

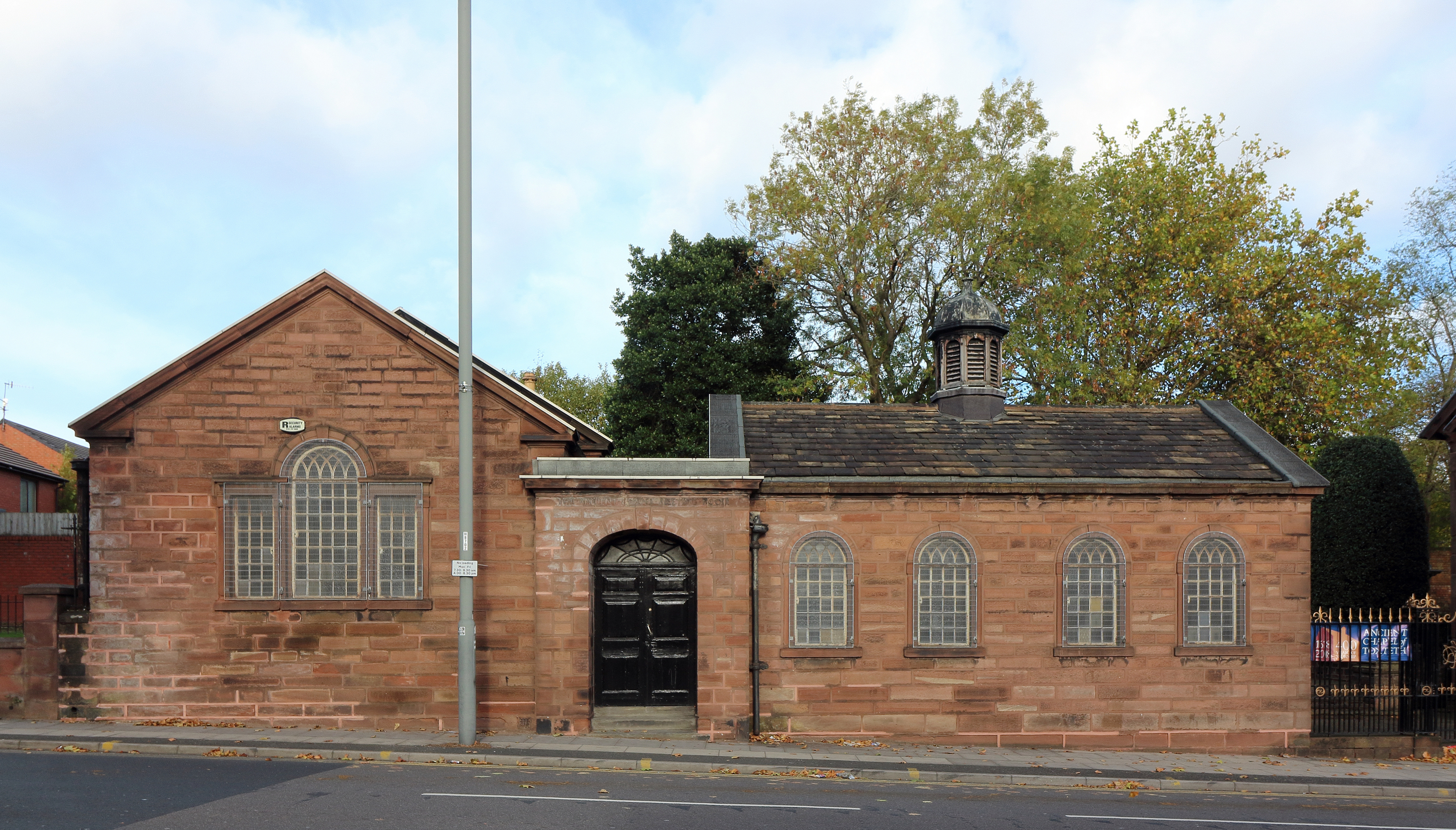
The schoolhouse next to the chapel

== See also ==
- Grade I listed buildings in Liverpool
- Grade I listed churches in Merseyside
- Ullet Road Unitarian Church
