= William Watson (poet) =

English poet; (1858 - 1935)

Sir William Watson
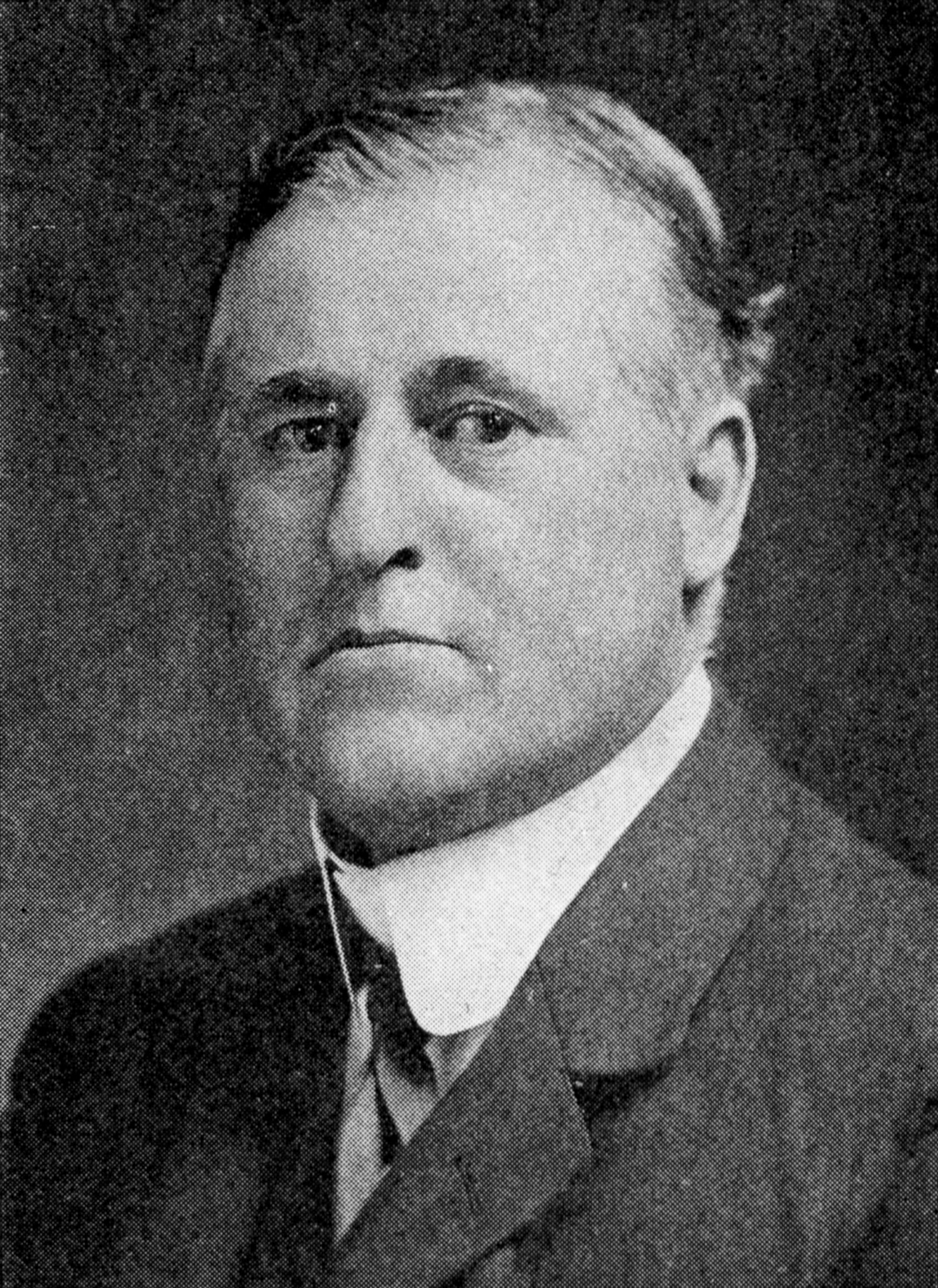
- Born: 2 August 1858; Burley-in-Wharfedale, Yorkshire
- Died: 11 August 1935 (aged 77); Rottingdean, Sussex

Signature
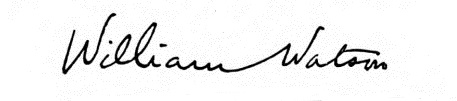

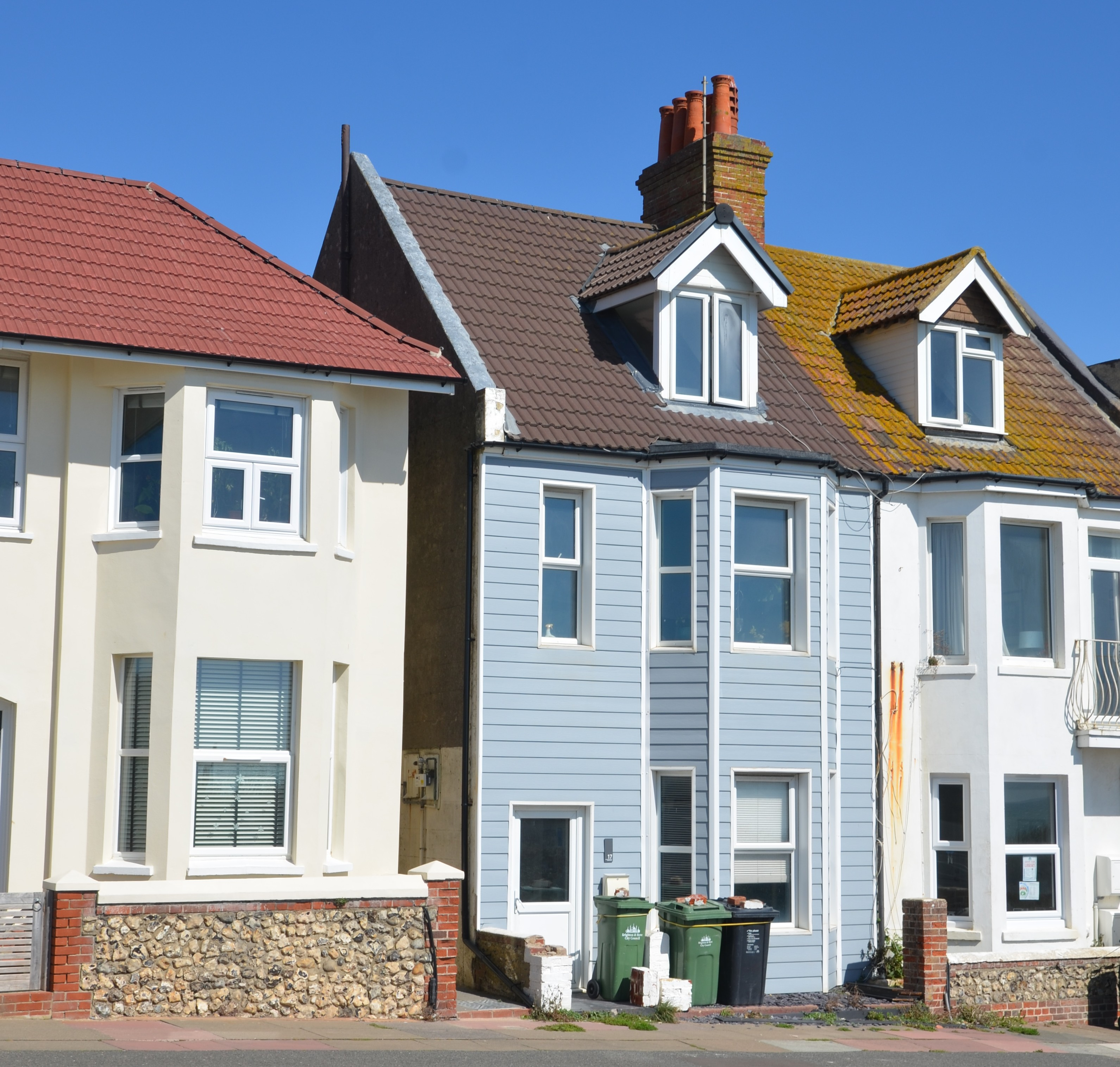
17 Marine Drive, Rottingdean, East Sussex, Watson's home for some years.

Sir William Watson (2 August 1858 – 11 August 1935) was an English poet, popular in his time for the celebratory content, and famous for the controversial political content, of his verse. Initially popularly recognised, he was then neglected because of changing tastes.

== Poet ==
Watson was born in Burley, in present-day West Yorkshire, and was brought up in Liverpool, where his father had moved for business. In 1880 he published his first book, The Prince's Quest, a poem showing the influence of Keats and Tennyson. It was republished in 1893. In 1884 appeared Epigrams of Art, Life and Nature, which already showed the mature Watson's characteristic restraint and concision.

He became a prolific poet of the 1890s, and a contributor to The Yellow Book, though without "decadent" associations, and on the traditionalist wing of English poetry. His reputation was established in 1891, with the publication of "Wordsworth's Grave", and the appearance in The Fortnightly Review, August 1891, of an article by Grant Allen entitled "A New Poet." On the occasion of Alfred Tennyson's death in 1892, he was a strong candidate to be his eulogist, the commission resulting in his "Lachrymae Musarum" (in a book by that name that also contained other poems). He suffered a breakdown later in 1892 and was passed over for the position of Poet Laureate in favour of Alfred Austin. Still, Prime Minister Gladstone bestowed on him the Civil List pension of £200 available on the death of Tennyson.

Watson regained his standing in 1894 with the publication of Odes and other poems, which included "Vita Nuova", expressing gratitude for his recovery. He courted controversy later in the decade with an attack on Turkey (The Purple East, 1896) and then later again with anti-Boer War poems. Although his politics were unpopular during these years, he was still regarded as a sincere and passionate poet, and in 1903 he produced a collection of poems contributed to various periodicals and called For England: Poems Written During Estrangement, a poetical defence of his impugned patriotism during the Boer War.

After Austin's death in 1913, Prime Minister Asquith considered him for the laureateship, despite the fact that he had written a cruel pasquil against his wife Margot Asquith ("She is not old, she is not young / The woman with the serpent's tongue"); but because of the contentious nature of his political poems, he was again passed over, this time for Robert Bridges. Perhaps in exchange for writing a panegyric of Lloyd George, or perhaps because of his support of the Great War effort, he was awarded a knighthood in 1917.

After World War I Watson was largely forgotten. A number of literary men in 1935 issued a public appeal for a fund to support him in his old age; he died the same year. He is buried in the graveyard of All Saints Church, Childwall, Liverpool

== Family ==
Watson married Adeline Maureen Pring in 1909; they had two daughters.

== Works ==
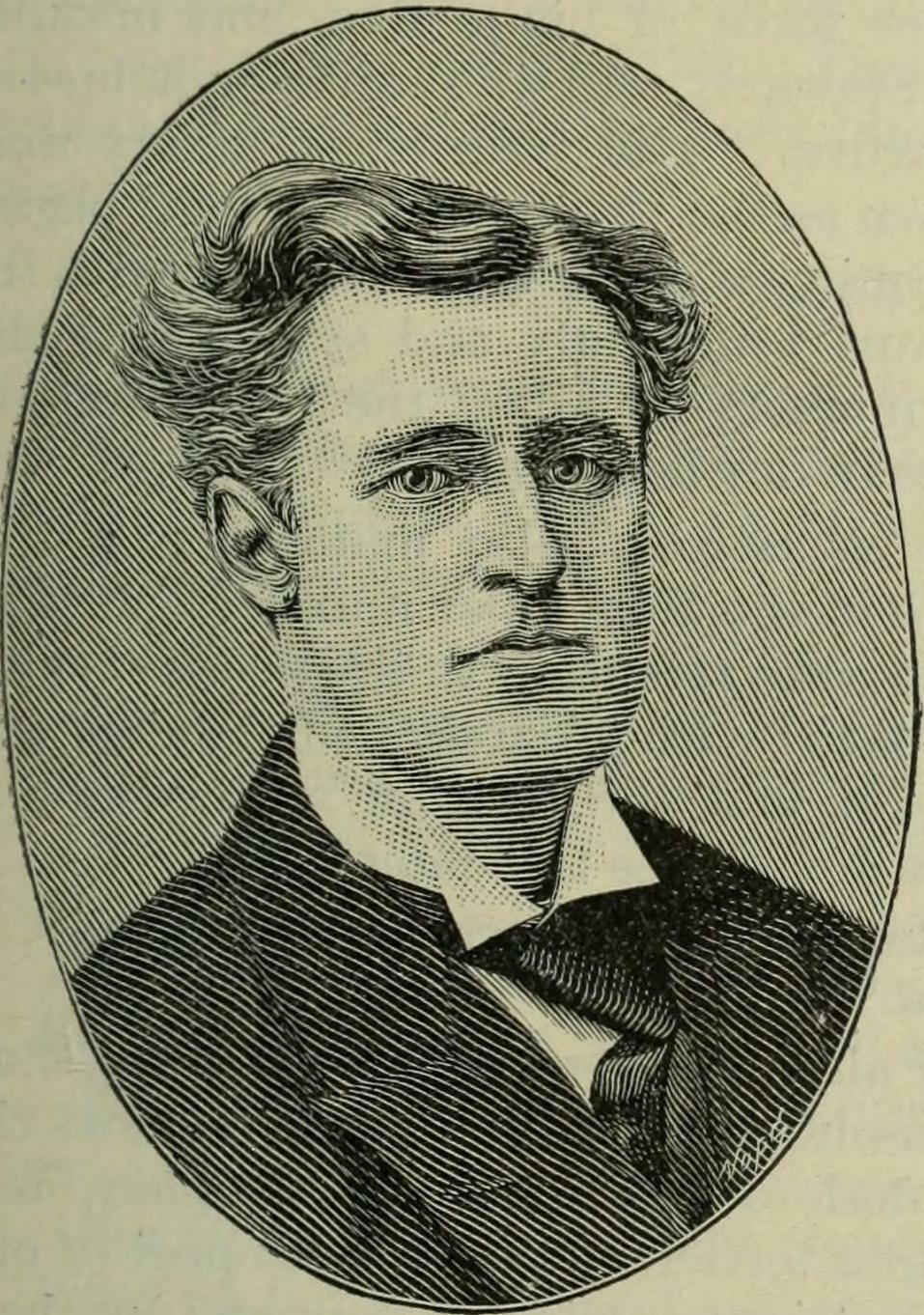
Young William Watson

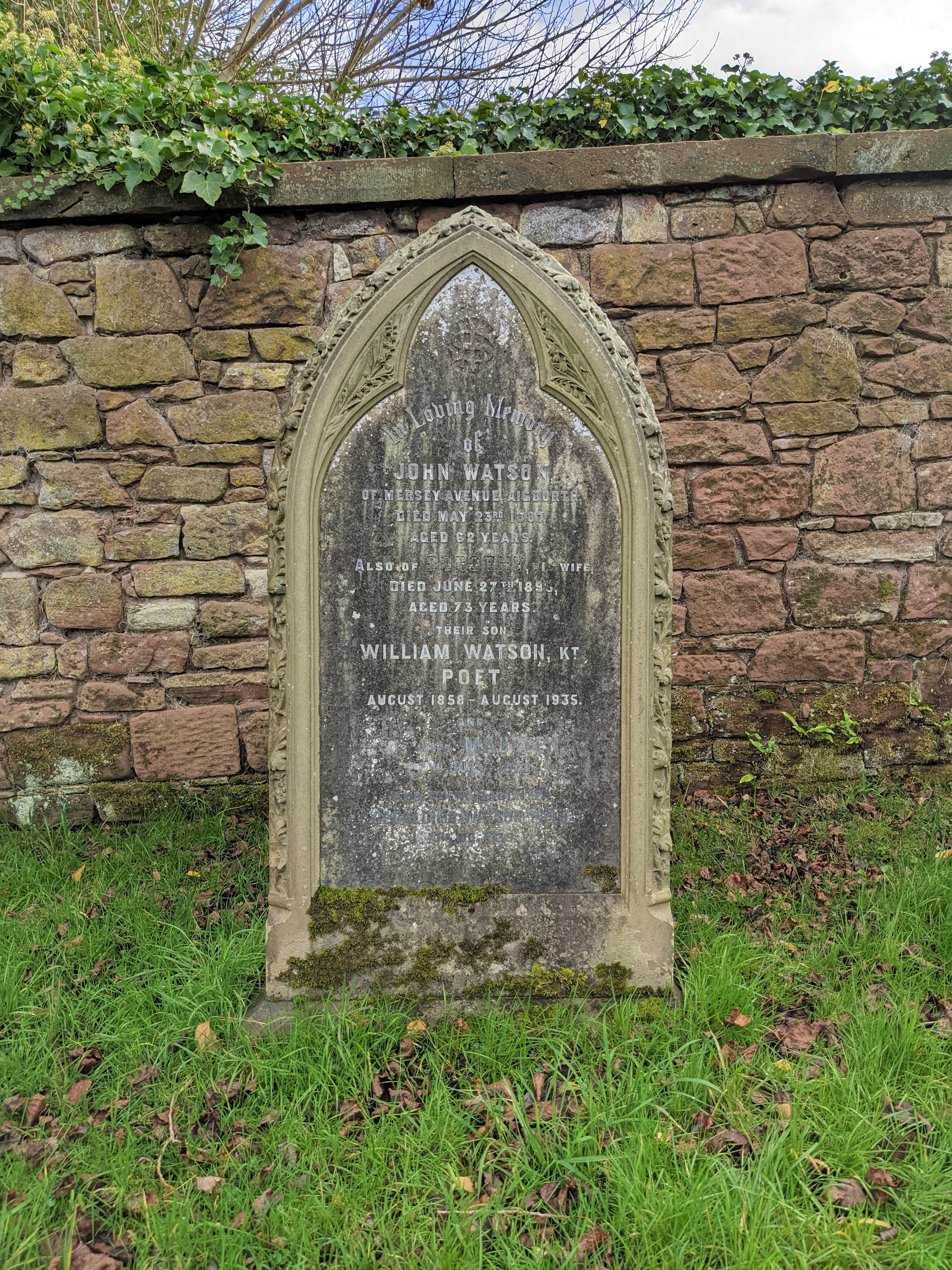
Grave of William Watson at All Saints Childwall

- The Prince's Quest and Other Poems (1880)
- Epigrams of Art, Life and Nature (1884)
- Wordsworth's Grave and Other Poems (1890)
- Poems (1892)
- Lachrymae Musarum (1892)
- Lyric Love: An Anthology (1892)
- Eloping Angels : A Caprice (1893)
- The Poems of William Watson (1893)
- Excursions in Criticism: Being Some Prose Recreations Of A Rhymer (1893)
- Odes and Other Poems (1894)
- The Father of the Forest & Other Poems (1895)
- The Purple East: A Series Of Sonnets On England's Desertion of Armenia (1896)
- The Year of Shame (1897)
- The Hope of the World and Other Poems (1898)
- The Collected Poems of William Watson (1898)
- Ode on the Coronation of King Edward VII (1908)
- Selected Poems (1903)
- For England. Poems Written During Estrangement (1904)
- New Poems (1909)
- Sable and Purple (1910)
- The Heralds of the Dawn: A Play in Eight Scenes (1912)
- The Muse in Exile (1913)
- Pencraft. A Plea For The Older Ways (1916)
- The Man Who Saw: and Other Poems Arising out of the War (1917)
- Retrogression and Other Poems (1917)
- The Superhuman Antagonists and Other Poems (1919)
- Ireland Unfreed. Poems and Verses written in the early months of 1921 (1921)
