= All Saints' Church, Childwall =

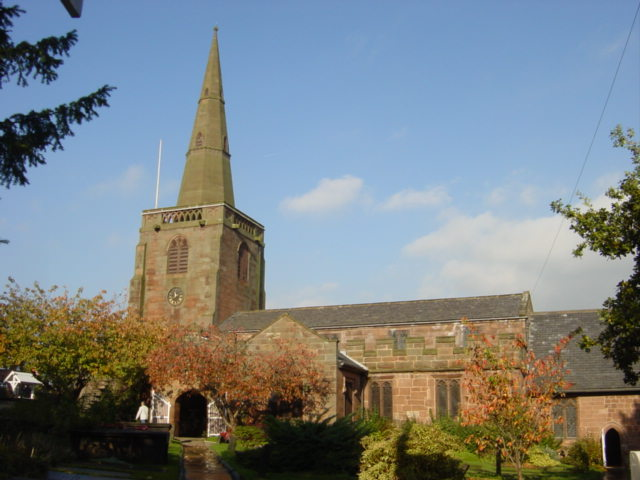
- All Saints' Church, Childwall, from the south
- All Saints' Church, Childwall
- 53.3953°N 2.8816°W
- OS grid reference: SJ 414 890
- Location: Childwall, Liverpool, Merseyside
- Country: England
- Denomination: Anglican
- Previous denomination: Roman Catholic
- Website: http://www.allsaints-childwall.org/

History
- Status: Parish church
- Founded: 14th century
- Dedication: All Saints

Architecture
- Functional status: Active
- Heritage designation: Grade I
- Designated: 28 June 1952
- Architect(s): W. Raffles Brown; James F. Doyle
- Architectural type: Church
- Style: Gothic

Specifications
- Materials: Red sandstone

Administration
- Province: York
- Diocese: Liverpool
- Archdeaconry: Liverpool
- Deanery: Liverpool South – Childwall

Clergy
- Vicar: Rev Andrew Colmer

All Saints' Church, is in Childwall, Liverpool, England. It is recorded in the National Heritage List for England as a designated Grade I listed building, and is the only medieval church remaining in the Metropolitan borough of Liverpool. It is an active Anglican parish church in the diocese of Liverpool, the archdeaconry of Liverpool and the deanery of Liverpool South – Childwall.

== History ==
The chancel dates from the 14th century, and the south aisle and porch are probably from the 15th century. Additions were made in the 18th century. The tower and spire were demolished and rebuilt in 1810–11, after the fatal collapse of the spire at Our Lady and Saint Nicholas led to concerns about the safety of other old spires. The new tower and spire were essentially identical to the old, but a few feet further to the west.

The north aisle dates from 1833 and it was partly rebuilt between 1900 and 1905. There are two chapels; the Plumbs' Chapel on the north side is dated 1716 and on the south side the Salisbury pew (formerly Isaac Green's Chapel) dates from 1739 to 1740. A restoration of the church was carried out by W. Raffles Brown in 1851–53. The rebuilding of the north aisle was by James F. Doyle and he added a vestry in 1905–06. Between 1987 and 1991 the external fabric of the church was restored and in 1994 the clock was also restored.

== Structure ==
The church is built in red sandstone. Its plan consists of a west tower, a nave with a clerestory, a chancel, a south aisle and a much wider north aisle which extends to the north of the chancel, and a south porch. A chapel projects from the north aisle and another from the south aisle. The west wall contains a leper's squint, which allowed those who were excluded from the church to view the service from outside. The squint is now below ground level, because when the old tower was demolished, the debris was never removed, only smoothed over. The present tower has a large two-light window, a clock on three faces and two-light bell-openings. The spire is recessed behind an openwork parapet with gargoyles.

Internally there are three arcades with octagonal columns and double-chamfered arches. A gallery extends across the west end of the nave and the south aisle. The chancel roof is wagon-vaulted. A fragment of a Saxon cross-shaft is attached to the west wall of the porch, and a Norman capital, positioned on its side, is set into the east wall of the chancel. The church's floor originally followed the slope of the hill on which it was built, with the result that the chancel was four or five feet lower than the base of the tower. The chancel was raised in 1851, but the floor of the nave still slopes visibly downward to the east.

== Fittings and furniture ==
Tower and hearse house

Inside the church are box pews which were installed in the restoration of 1851–53. The choir stalls date from the early 20th century; they were designed by Bodley and Scott and had been intended for the Lady Chapel of Liverpool Cathedral. In 2006 the choir stalls were returned to Liverpool Cathedral.In a display case is an elaborately carved bench end dating probably from the early 17th century. The brass chandelier in the nave is dated 1737 and there are two copies of it dated 1892 in the chancel.

The church contains a total of 12 hatchments and a number of benefactor and charity boards. In the south aisle are two funerary recesses which contain memorials to the Norris family of Speke Hall. The north chancel aisle contains an enamelled brass by Warrington to the memory of Major W. Pitcairn Campbell who died in 1855.

The stained glass includes windows by William Warrington, by Kempe, by Heaton, Butler and Bayne, by Percy Bacon and by Mary Lowndes. In the south wall of the chancel are the remains of a 14th-century piscina, now at floor level due to the 19th-century raising of the chancel. A 14th-century priests' door is preserved in a display case on the north wall. There is a ring of six bells which were cast in 1912 by John Warner & Sons.

== External features ==
The churchyard contains the graves of John Charles Ryle, the first Anglican Bishop of Liverpool, and his wife, and the grave of the poet William Watson, as well as Commonwealth War Graves Commission graves of six service personnel of World War I, and five of World War II. Against the south wall of the churchyard is an elaborate pedimented arch which is a memorial to Sir Andrew Barclay Walker and his wife. Also in the churchyard is a sandstone hearse house dated 1811 which is a Grade II listed building.

== In media ==
The church is regularly used as a filming location in the Hollyoaks soap opera. Actress Nikki Sanderson performed a stunt, involving her regular character of Maxine Minniver, at the top of the church tower on 10 April 2015.

== Leadership ==
On 28 September 2024, the Parish held the ordination of its Curate, the Rev. Adeyinka Olushonde, Rev. Olushonde now serves the Parish as Curate.

== See also ==
- Grade I listed churches in Merseyside
