= Ullet Road Unitarian Church =

Coordinates: 53.3898°N 2.9381°W

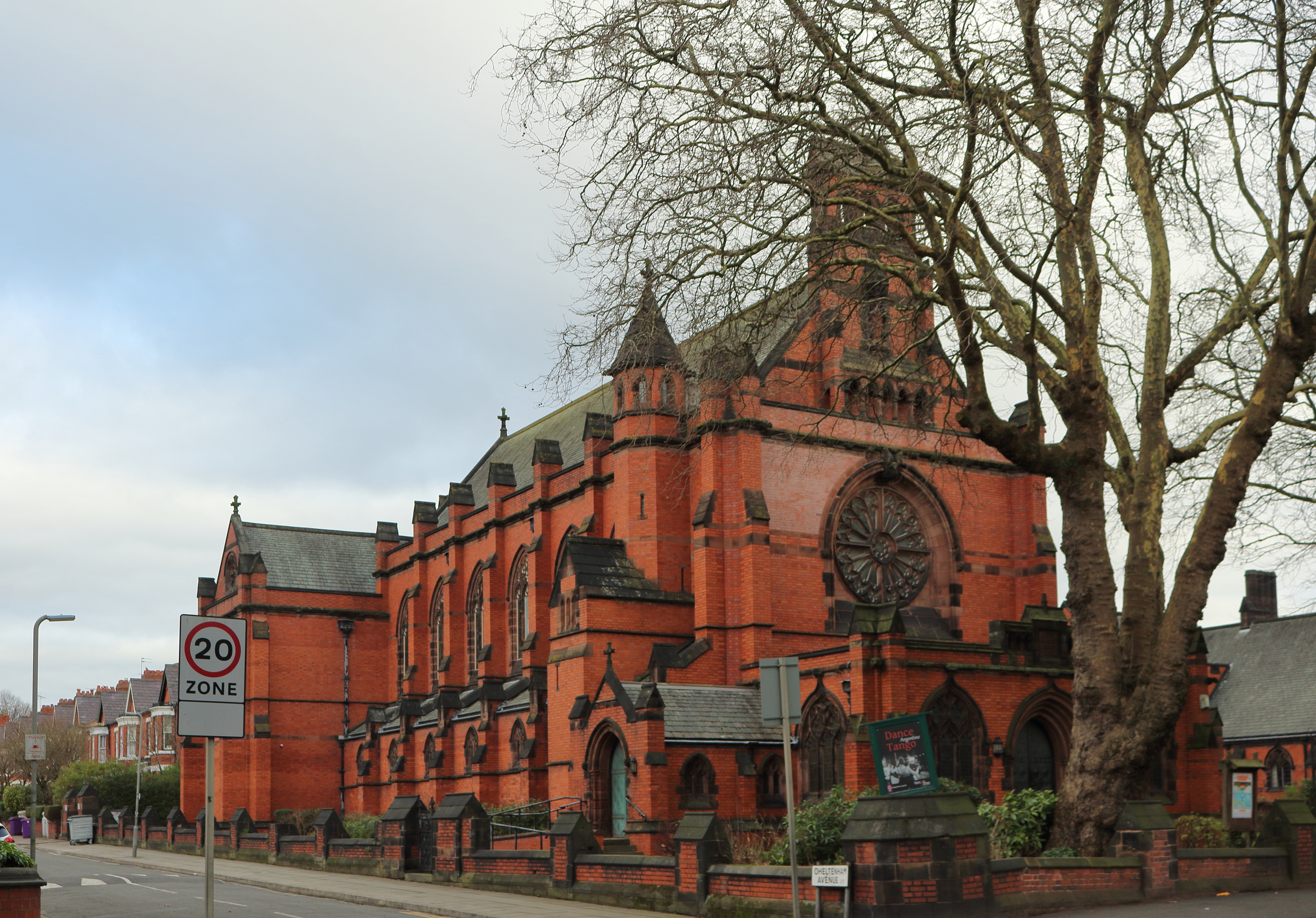
- Ullet Road Unitarian Church

- Location in Merseyside
- OS grid reference: SJ 377 885
- Location: 57 Ullet Road, Sefton Park, Liverpool, Merseyside
- Country: England
- Denomination: Unitarian
- Website: Ullet Road Unitarian Church

Architecture
- Functional status: Active
- Heritage designation: Grade I
- Designated: 14 March 1975
- Architect(s): Thomas and Percy Worthington
- Architectural type: Church
- Style: Gothic Revival
- Groundbreaking: 1896
- Completed: 1899

Specifications
- Materials: Red brick exterior Sandstone interior Slate roofs

Ullet Road Church is a Unitarian church at 57 Ullet Road, Sefton Park, Liverpool. Both the church and its attached hall are separately recorded in the National Heritage List for England as designated Grade I listed buildings. It was the first place of worship in the United Kingdom to register a civil partnership for a same-sex couple. It is a member of the General Assembly of Unitarian and Free Christian Churches, the umbrella organisation for British Unitarians.

== History ==
The predecessors of the congregation now worshipping in Ullet Road originated from a group of Presbyterians during the later part of the 17th century, that is, in the immediate aftermath of the English Civil War. They originally gathered in a meeting house in Castle Hey, and in 1727 moved to a new chapel in Benn's Gardens. In 1811 they moved to another new chapel in Renshaw Street, and by this time had become Unitarians, as many English Presbyterians did. Despite some opposition, in 1894 the congregation decided to move to what was then a suburb of Liverpool. The architects Thomas and Percy Worthington, Unitarians from Manchester, were commissioned to design the church and associated buildings. The church opened in June 1899, followed by the hall and other associated buildings in 1902.

== Architecture ==
=== Church exterior ===
The church is constructed in red Ruabon brick with red sandstone dressings, and has roofs of Westmorland slate. The interior is lined with sandstone from quarries at Runcorn. The architectural style is Gothic Revival with Art Nouveau features. The church is aligned north–south, with the main entrance on the south side. Its plan consists of a three-bay narthex (entrance hall), a seven-bay nave with a clerestory, narrow aisles, and a chancel with a polygonal apse. At the south end of the church is a three-arched structure resembling a bellcote, but without bells. Below the arches is a niche containing a statue of Christ, and under this is a rose window. The bays along the sides of the church are divided by gabled buttresses. Each aisle bay contains a two-light window, and in each bay of the clerestory is a taller three-light window. The windows contain Decorated-style tracery. The doors at the south end of the church and on the sides are in oak with beaten copper cladding in Art Nouveau style designed by Richard Llewellyn Rathbone.

=== Church interior ===
Inside the church, the nave is wide and the aisles are narrow, forming passages. The arcades are carried on round piers. The walls of the chancel curve forward to incorporate the pulpit on one side and the reading desk on the other. Above the pulpit is a sounding board, the underside of which is lined with beaten copper. On the front of the pulpit is a shield inscribed with Fiat Lux (Let there be light), and on the front of the reading desk is a carved eagle. Behind the altar is a wooden reredos carved by H. H. Martyn & Co. of Cheltenham, based on Leonardo da Vinci's Last Supper. On each side of the chancel are finely carved wooden choir stalls. Above those on the east side is an elaborate canopy in memory of Henry Tate carved by C. J. Allen. The font was also carved by Allen; it is movable and was designed by Ronald Potter Jones. When it was built, the church was wired for electricity. This supplied power for the series of copper electroliers in the nave, which are in Arts and Crafts style and made by the Artificers' Guild of London.

The stained glass in the windows of the chancel, and in eight of the clerestory windows, was made by Morris & Co., based on designs by Edward Burne-Jones, and dated between 1901 and 1928. Of the later windows, two were made by James Powell and Sons of Whitefriars, and a third by William Wilson of Edinburgh. The three-manual pipe organ was moved to the present church from Renshaw Street. It had been built in 1869 by William Hill & Son, and repaired between 1873 and 1883 by Gray and Davidson. It was rebuilt in 1910 by Rushworth and Dreaper, and overhauled by the same firm in 1937.

=== Vestry and library ===
To the east of the chancel are the vestry and the library. These were commissioned by Sir John Brunner and contain ceiling paintings by Gerald Moira. In the vestry the paintings are in four oval panels, and depict the virtues of Fortitude, Temperance, Justice, and Charity. The library ceiling reflects the allegory of the Triumph of Truth. It depicts the images of philosophers, writers and religious figures, and incorporates a portrait of Brunner. The main figure represents Truth held by Father Time. Originally depicted naked, the artist was persuaded to clothe her in "classical but revealing drapery".

=== Hall and cloister ===
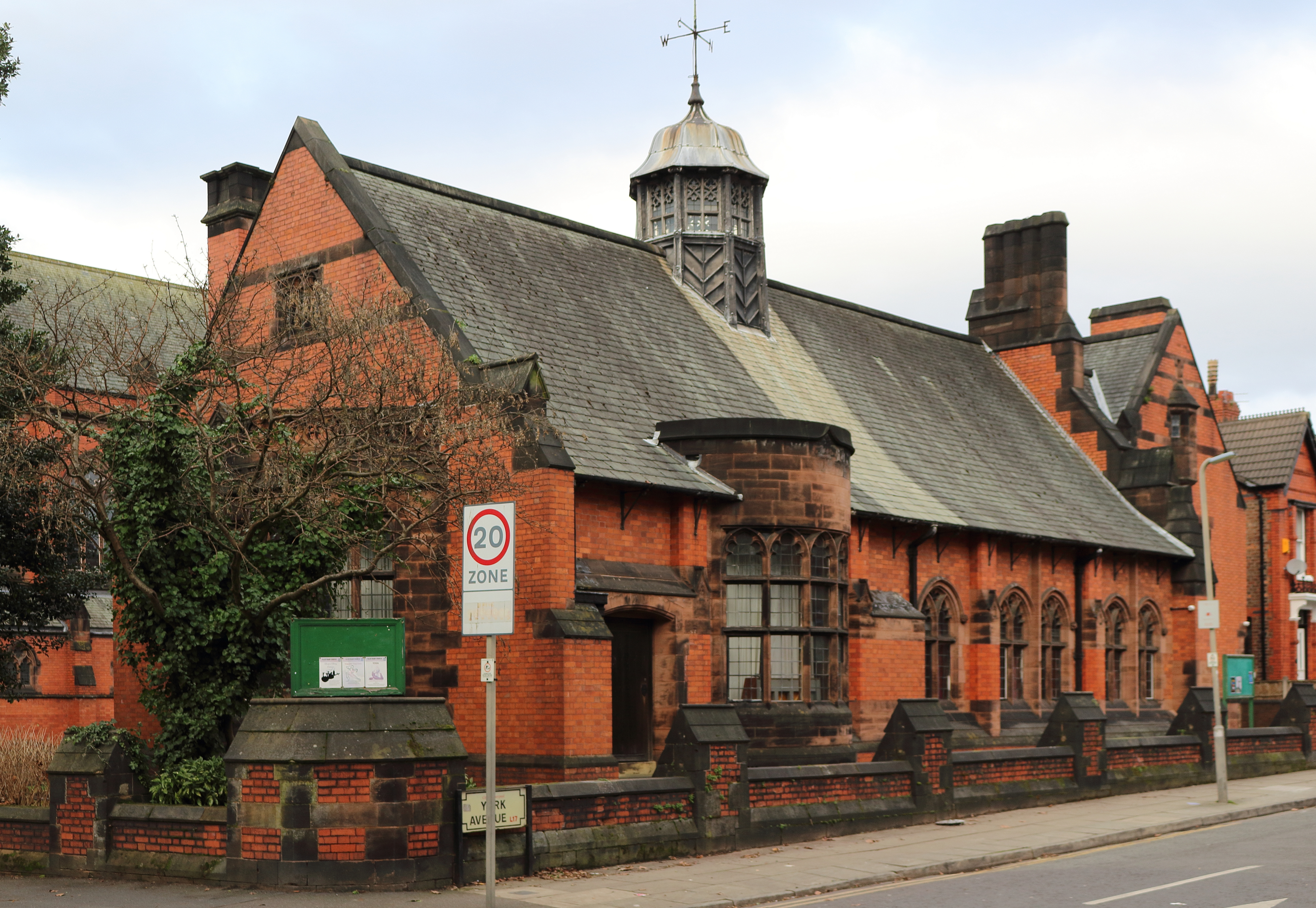
Church Hall

To the east of the library is a cloister leading to the church hall. These were designed by Percy Worthington and have been designated separately from the church at Grade I. They form an L-shaped plan, with the hall standing parallel to the church. Like the church, they are in red brick, with stone dressings and slate roofs. This part of the complex was paid for by Sir John Brunner and the son of Henry Tate. The cloister contains memorials moved from the previous chapels. They include a bust of William Roscoe by John Gibson; memorials to Edward Rathbone who died in 1834, also by Gibson; to William Rathbone, who died in 1868, by J. H. Foley; to Charles Beard, who died in 1888, by J. E. Boehm; and to William Rathbone, who died in 1902, by C. J. Allen. The hall "has the appearance of a medieval banqueting hall". It is in five irregular bays; its roof is arch-braced, and it contains an arcade on its west side incorporating a large fireplace. Over the fireplace are the carved arms of the Brunner and Tate families. Rising from the centre of the open-timber roof is a lantern surmounted by a cupola with an ogee-shaped roof. On the south side of the hall is a canted bay window, and on the east side is a smaller circular bay window.

=== External features ===
Together, the buildings are grouped around three sides of a central garden. The authors of the Buildings of England series comment that this gives a "collegiate feel", a reference to an architectural quadrangle. The grading citations state that they form "one of the most elaborate Non-conformist ensembles in the country". The gardens are enclosed by a wall and gates that are designated at Grade II. The walls are in brick, with a stone plinth, coping and dressings. The original church entrance gates and the railings were designed by the architects, and constructed by George Wragge. The railings were removed during the Second World War. The gates were renovated and rehung in 1988, but were stolen a few weeks later.

== Present day ==
Regular services are held in the church, and both the church and the hall are used for a variety of functions, including concerts and dances. Children are introduced to the church by a ceremony of Blessing (rather than by baptism). Weddings and funerals are arranged by the church. On 6 May 2012 it became the first place of worship in the United Kingdom to register a civil partnership for a same-sex couple.

== Gallery ==
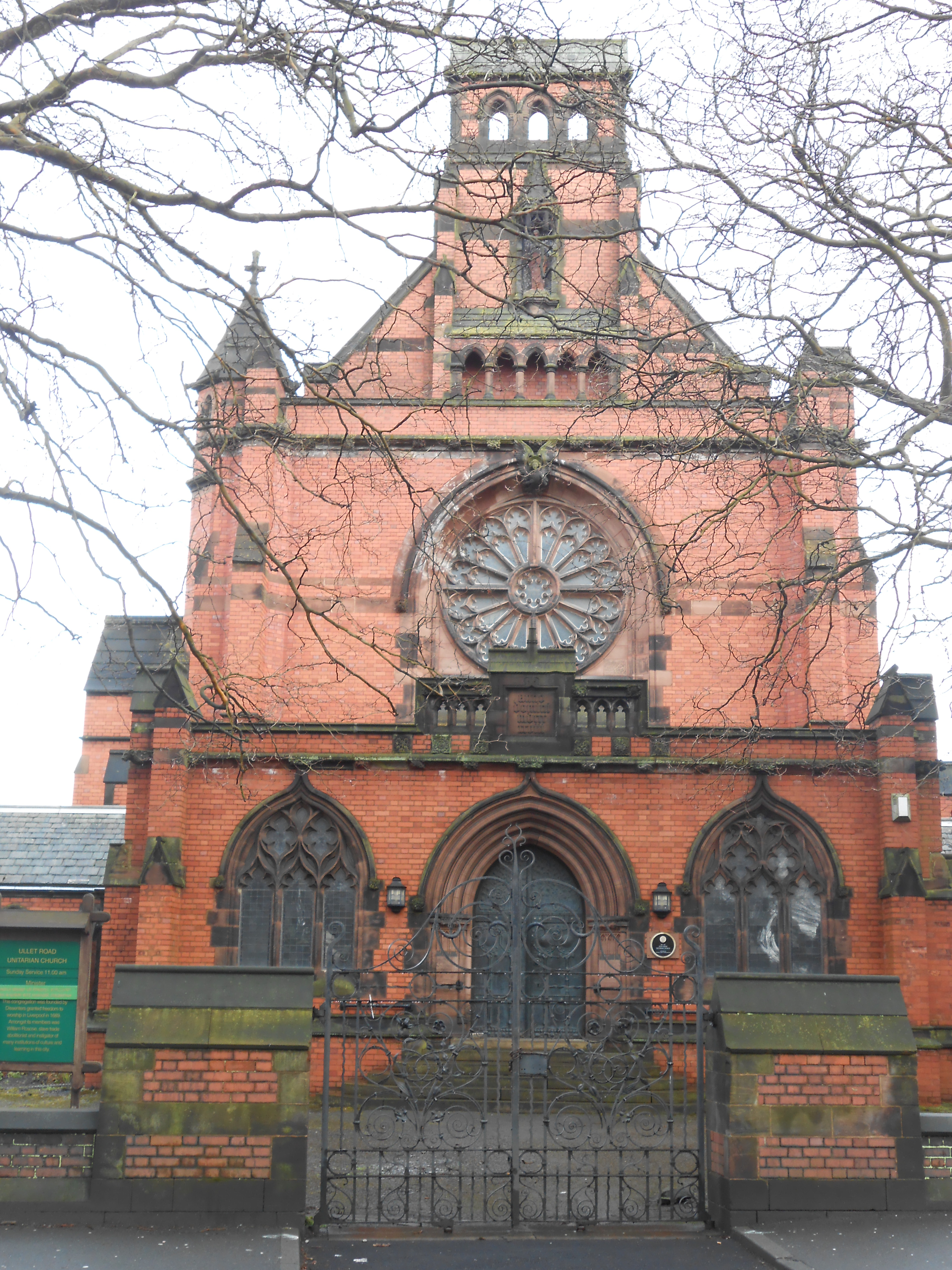
West front

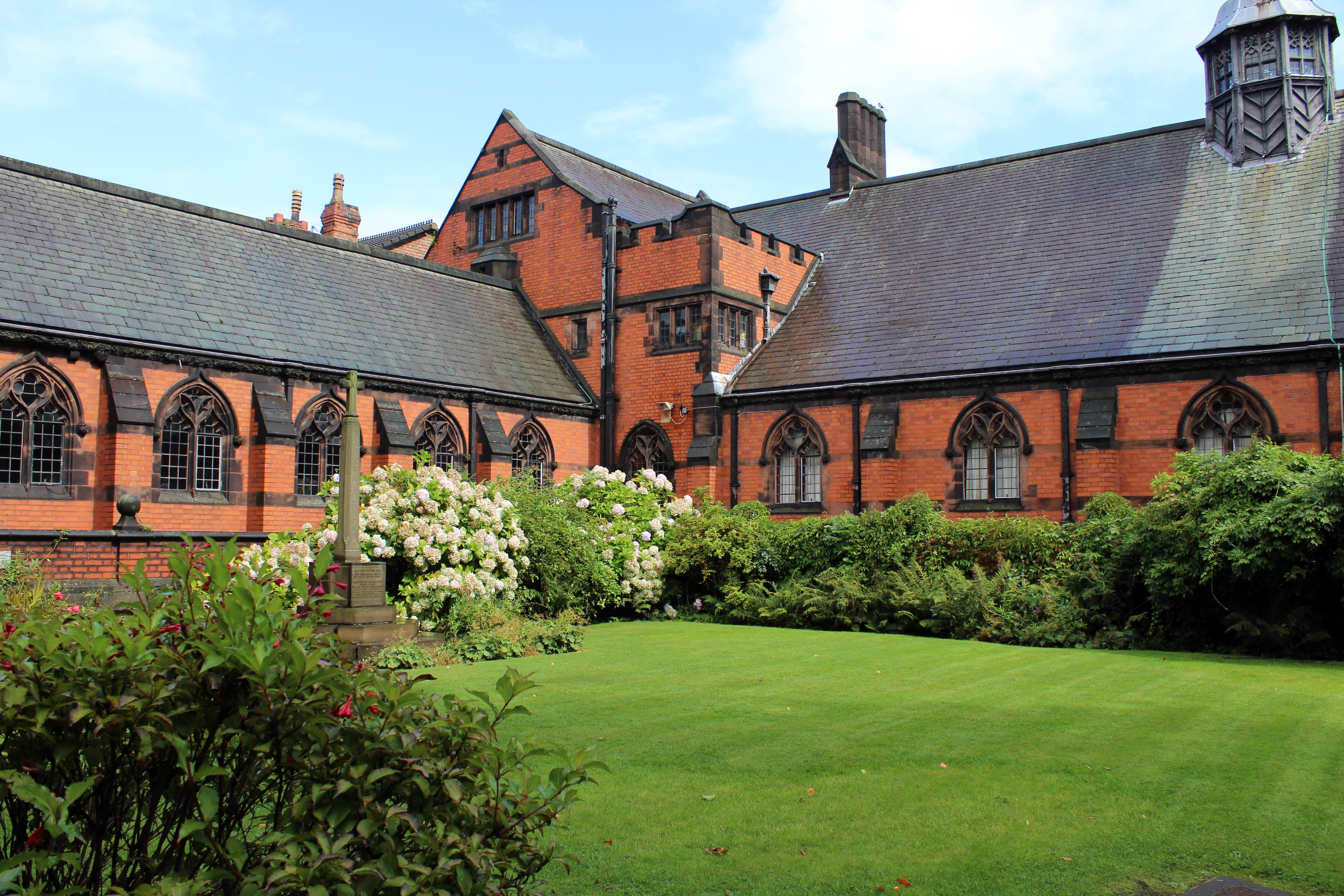
Exterior of cloister and church hall

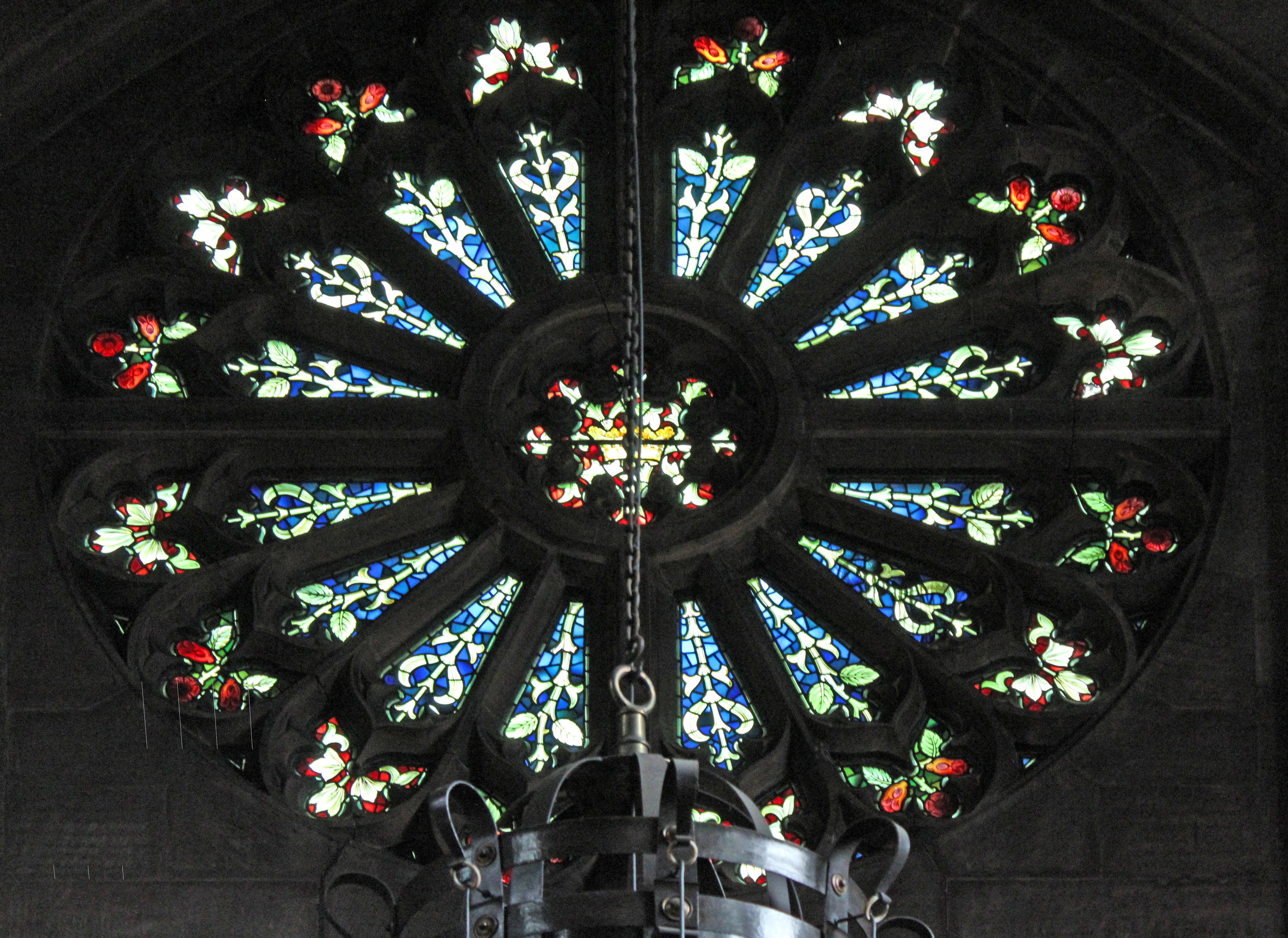
Stained glass in western Rose window

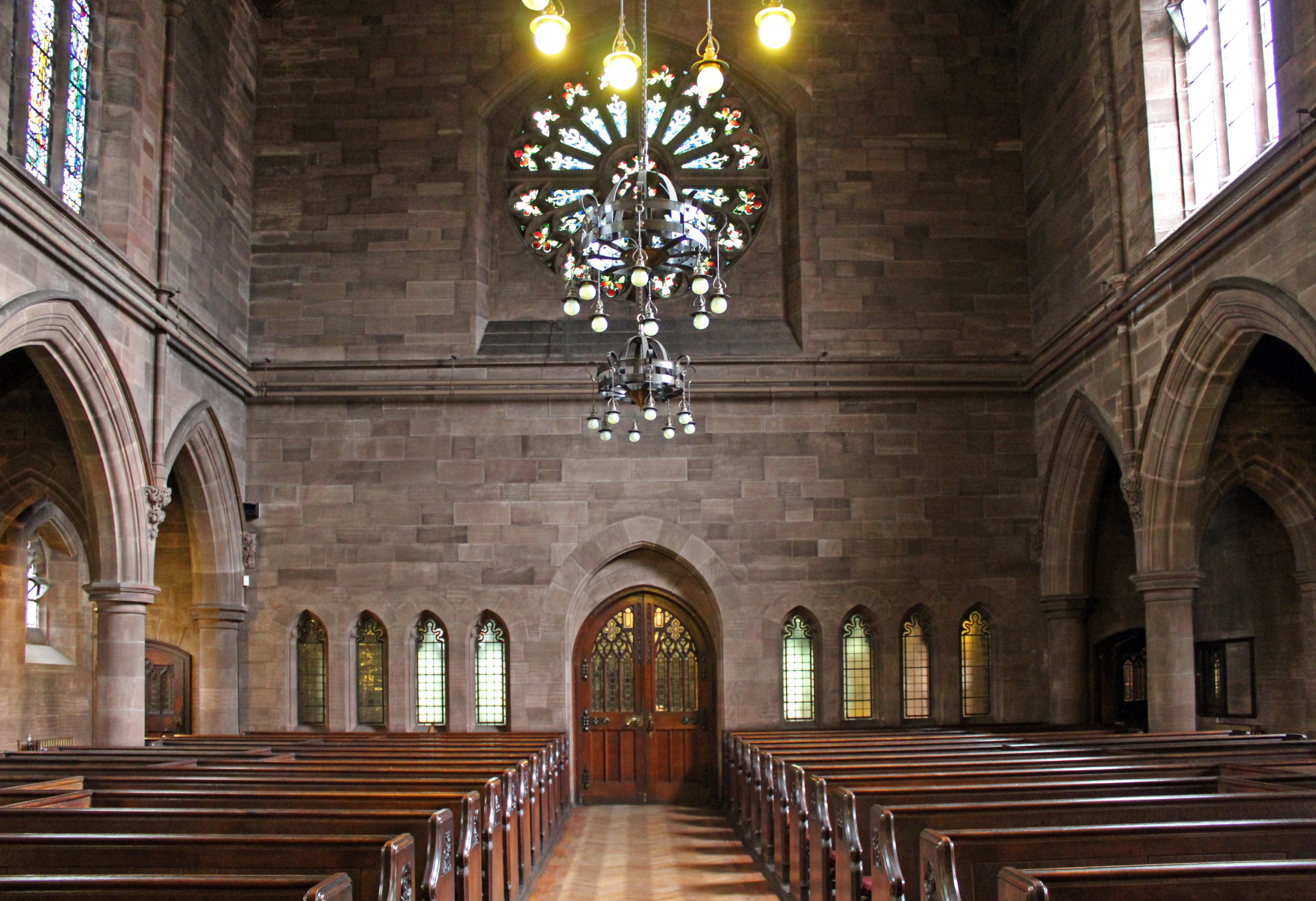
Nave looking west

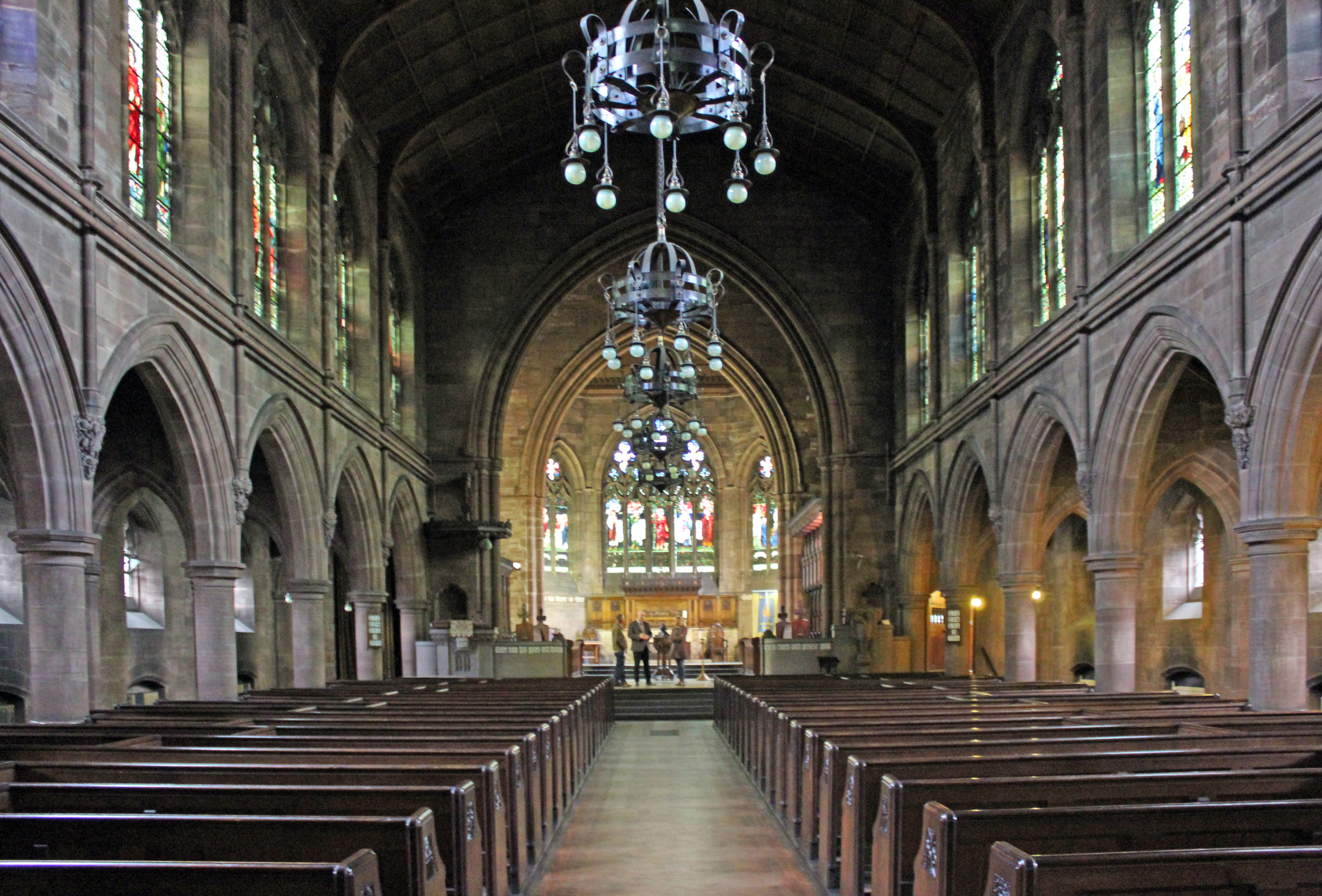
Nave looking east

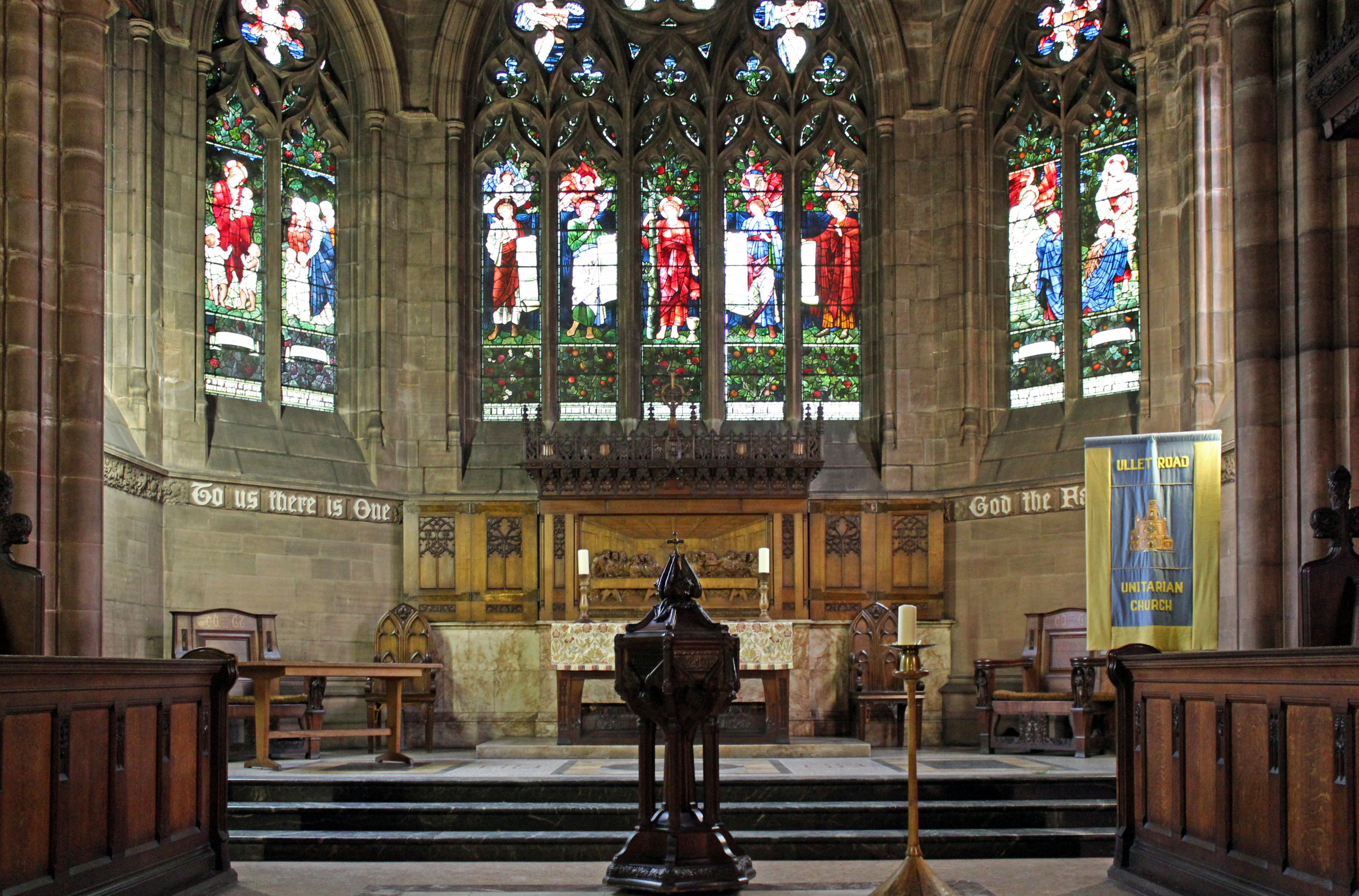
High altar, reredos Last Supper carved by H. H. Martyn, stained glass designed by Edward Burne-Jones and executed by William Morris

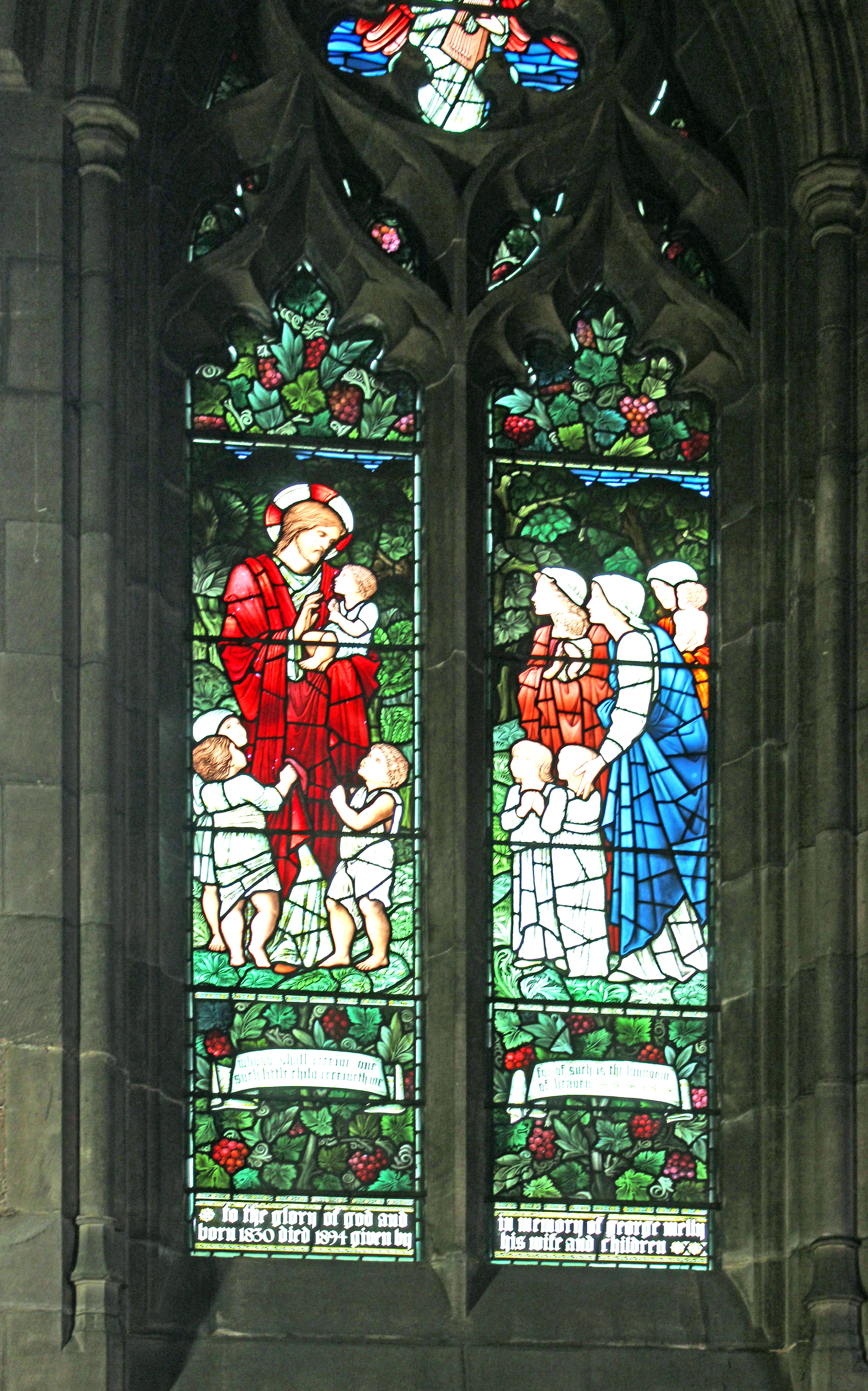
NorthWest window in apse, depicting "suffer the little children". Memorial to George Melly (d. 1894)

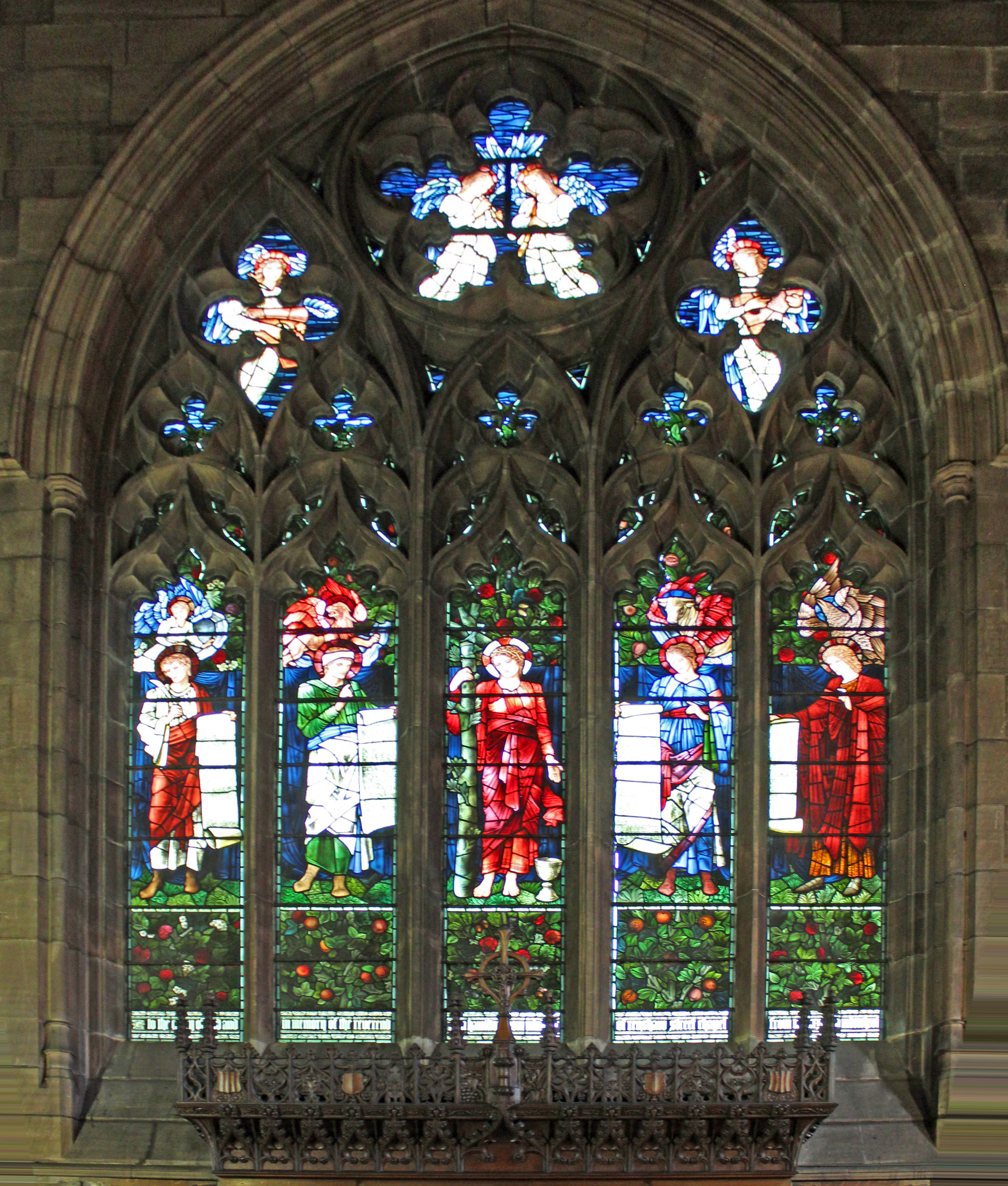
The east window in apse, by Burne-Jones/Morris Co. depicting Jesus as the Tree of Life, surrounded by the evangelists.

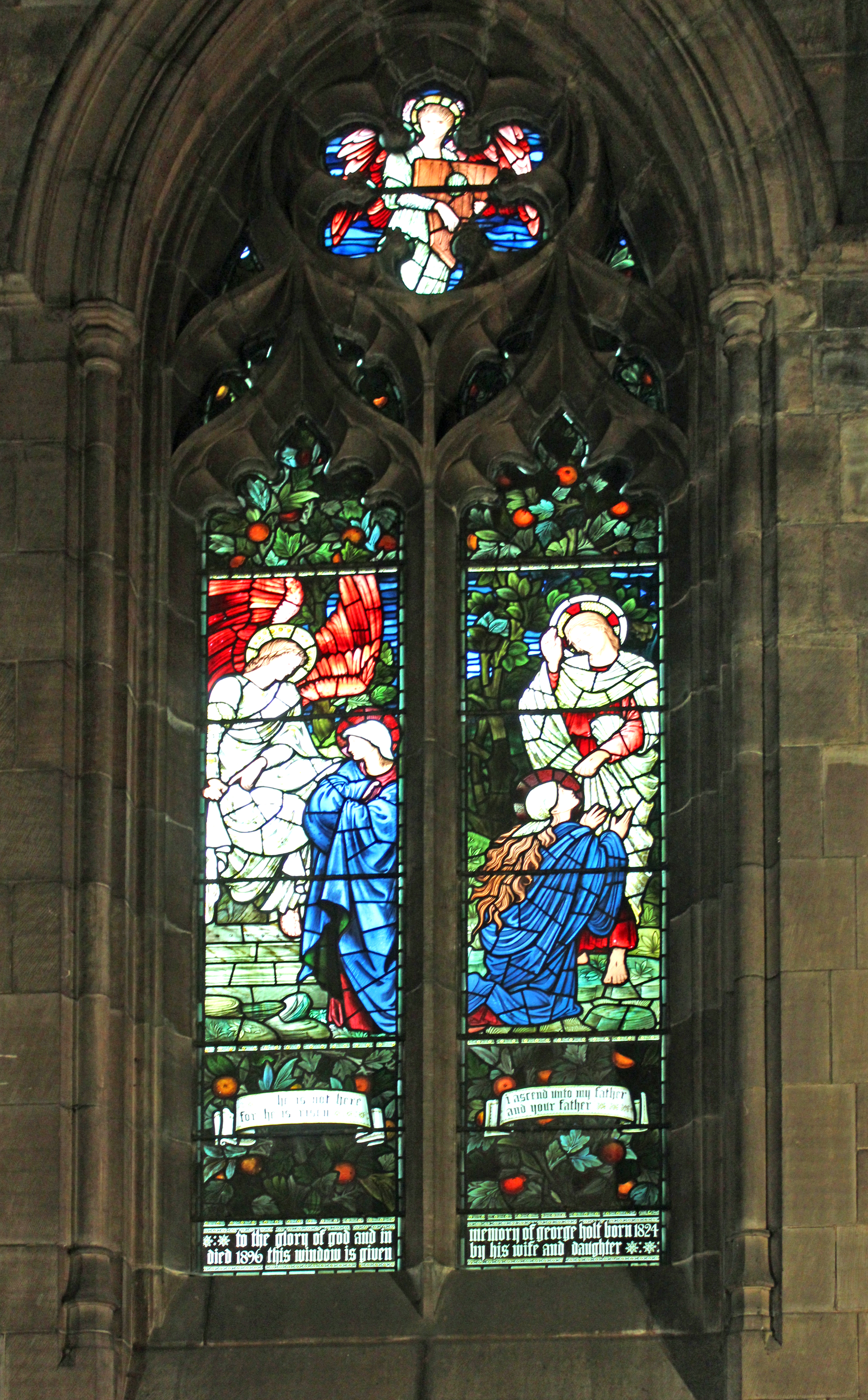
Northeast widow in apse, by Burne-Jones/Morris Co. depicting the ascension. Memorial to George Holt (d.1896)

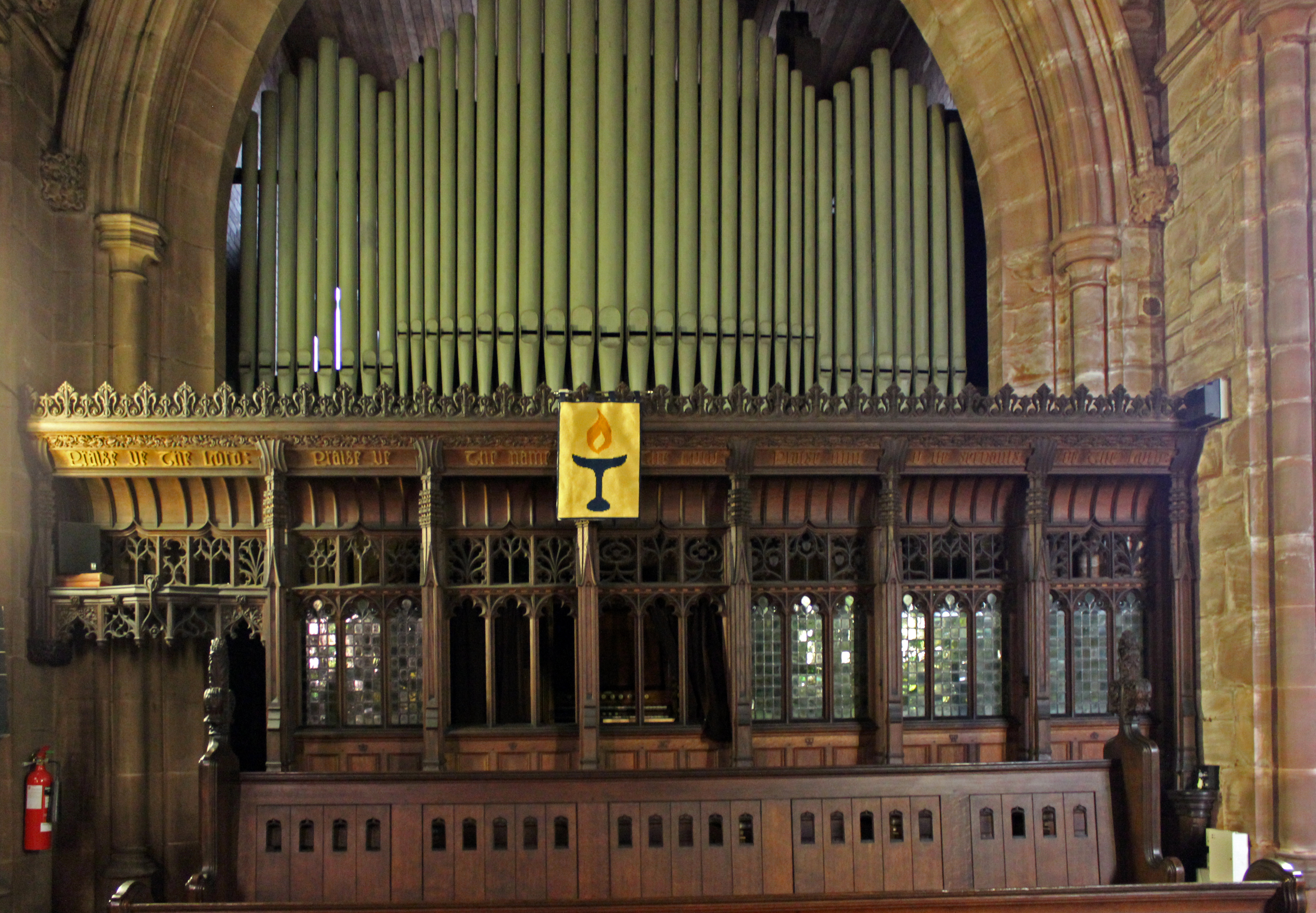
The choir stalls and organ

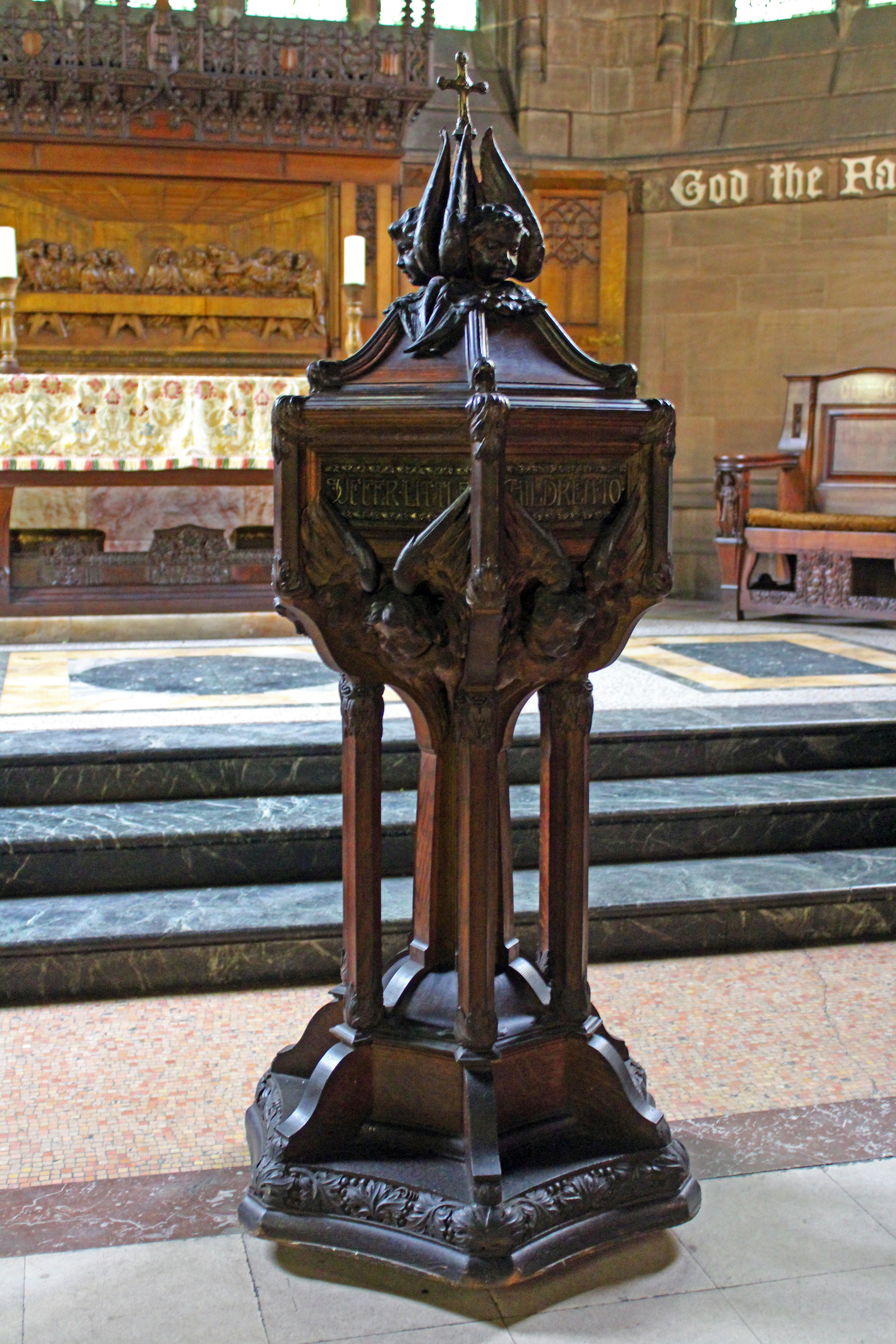
The font

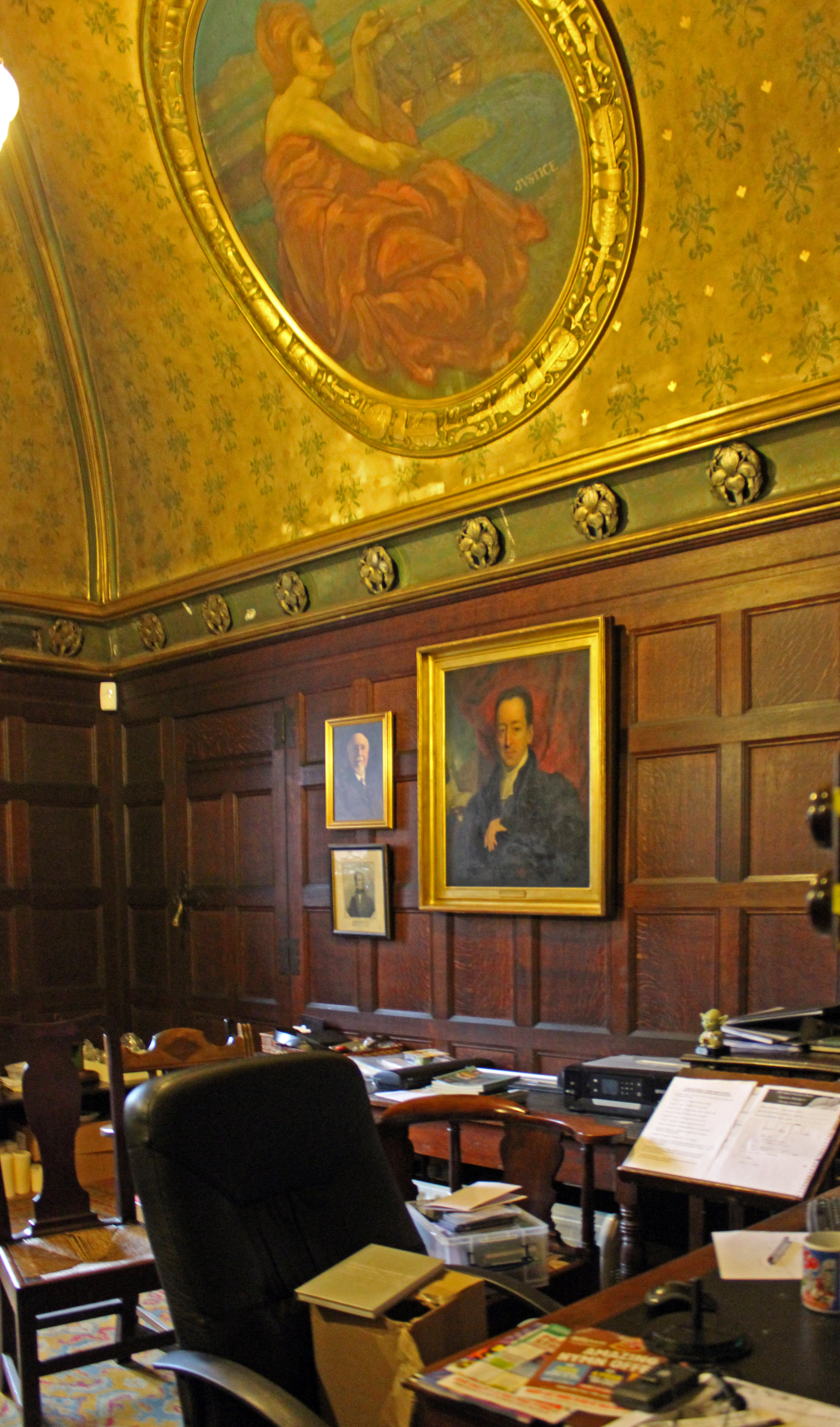
The Vestry

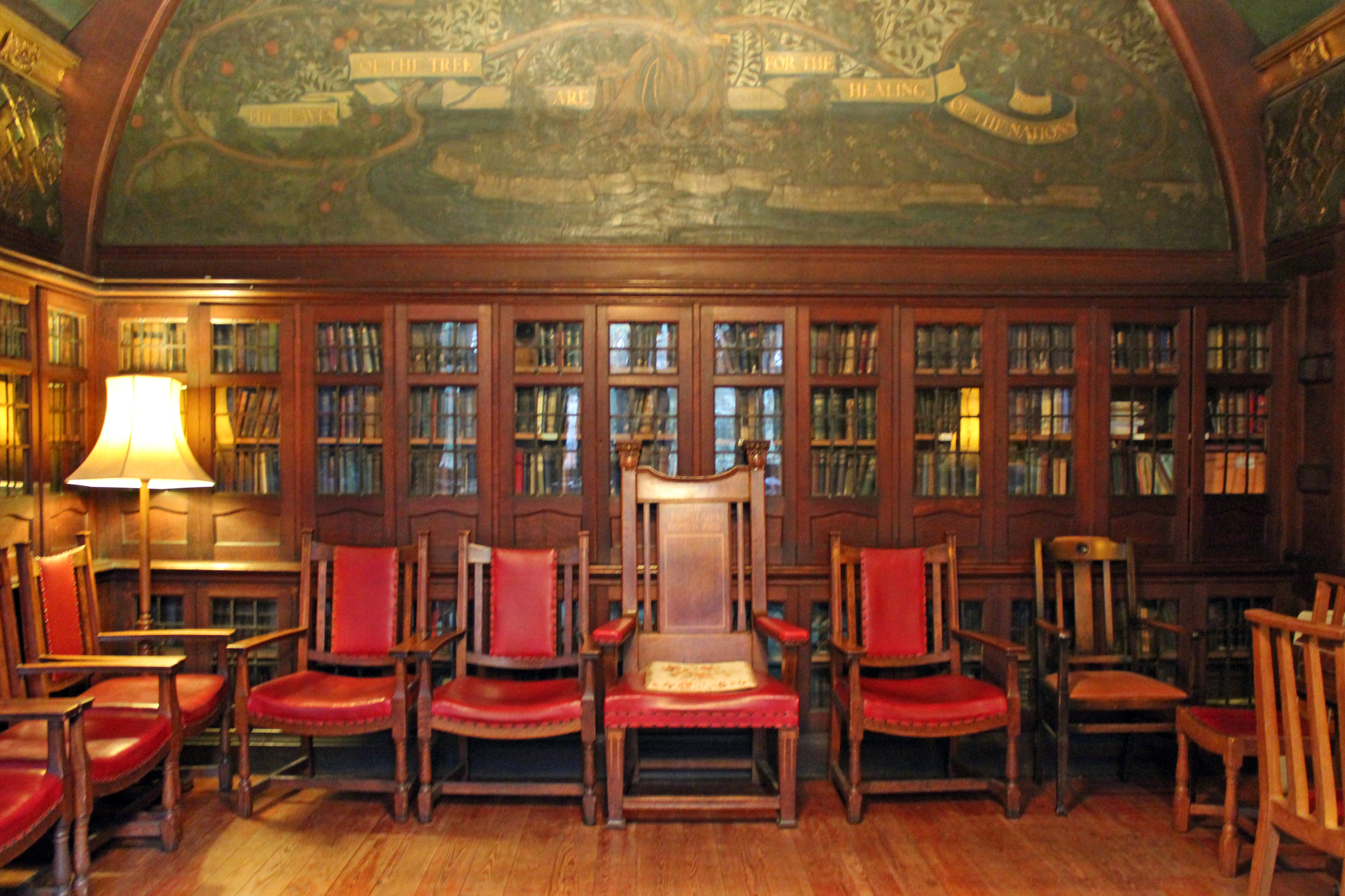
The Library

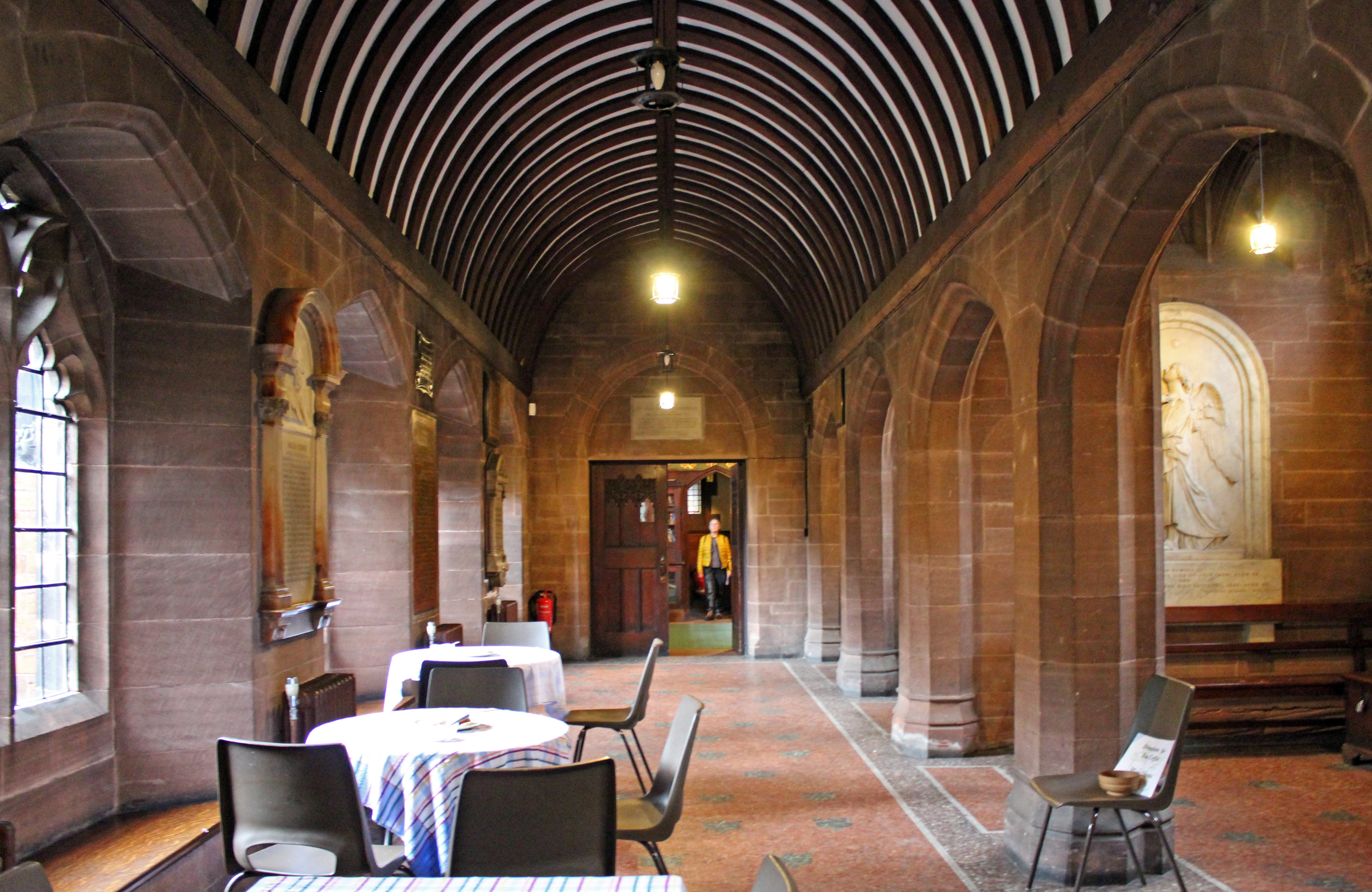
The Cloister

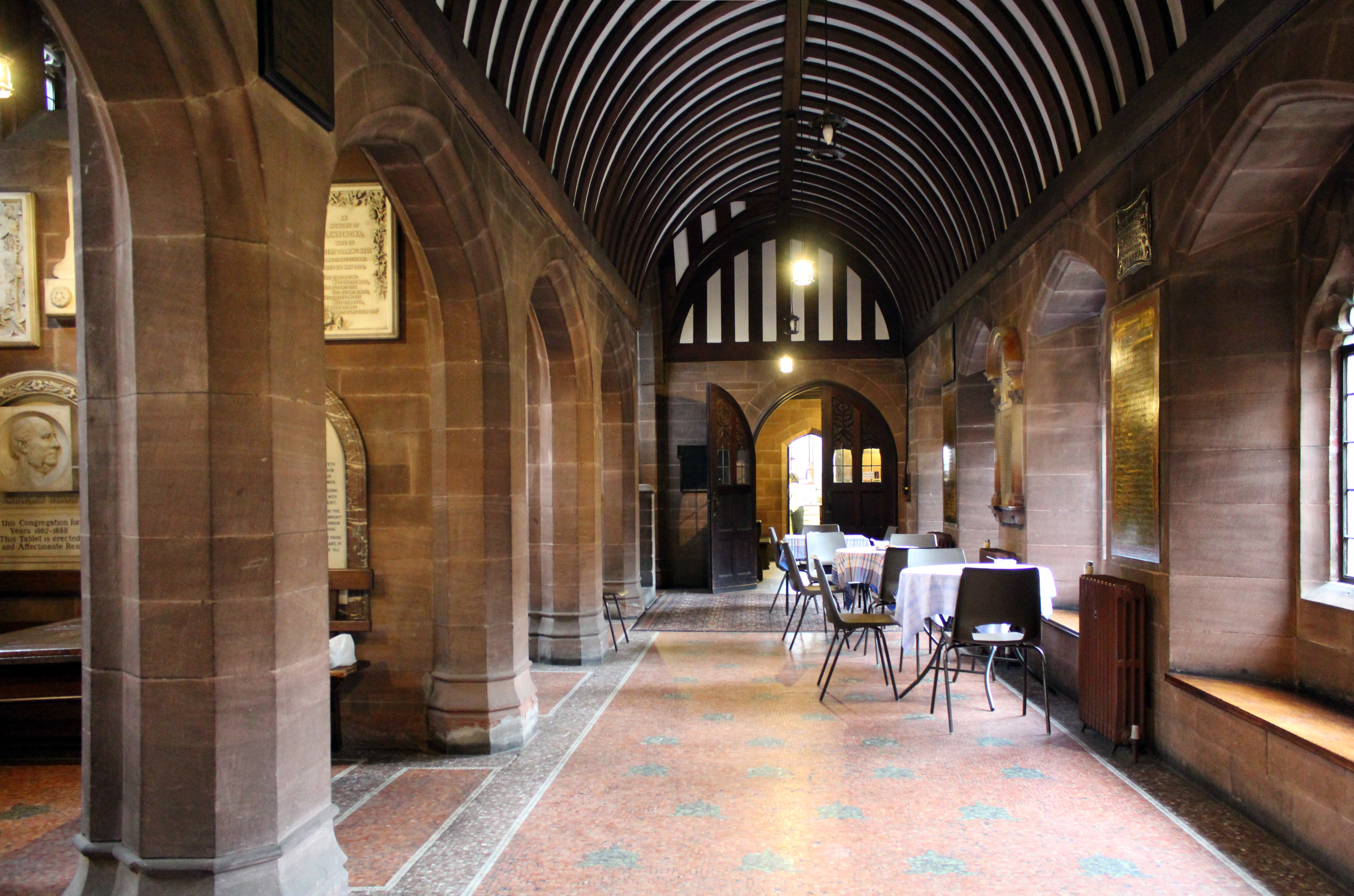
The Cloister

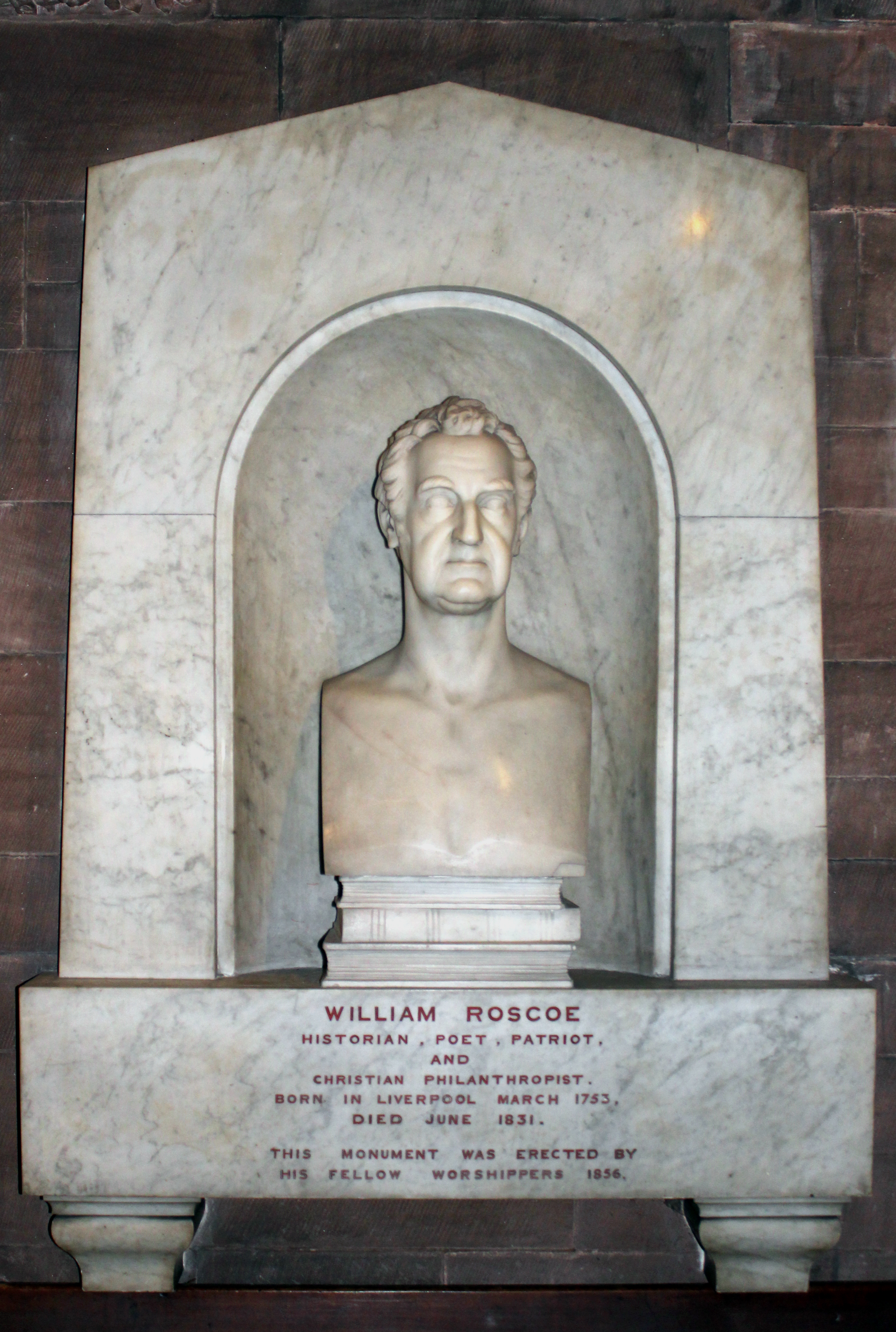
Memorial to William Roscoe, in cloister, carved by John Gibson

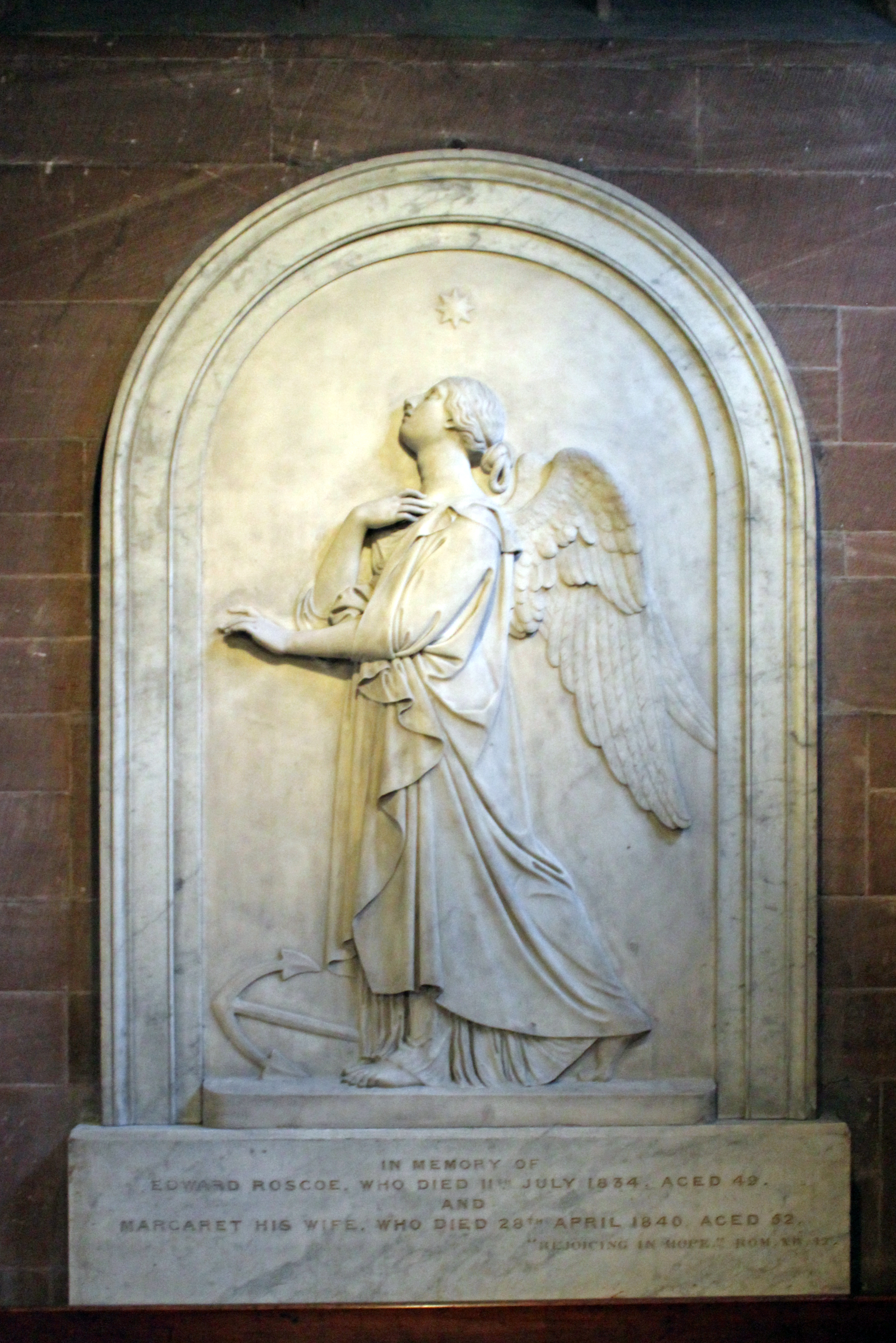
Edward Roscoe Memorial, in cloister, by John Gibson

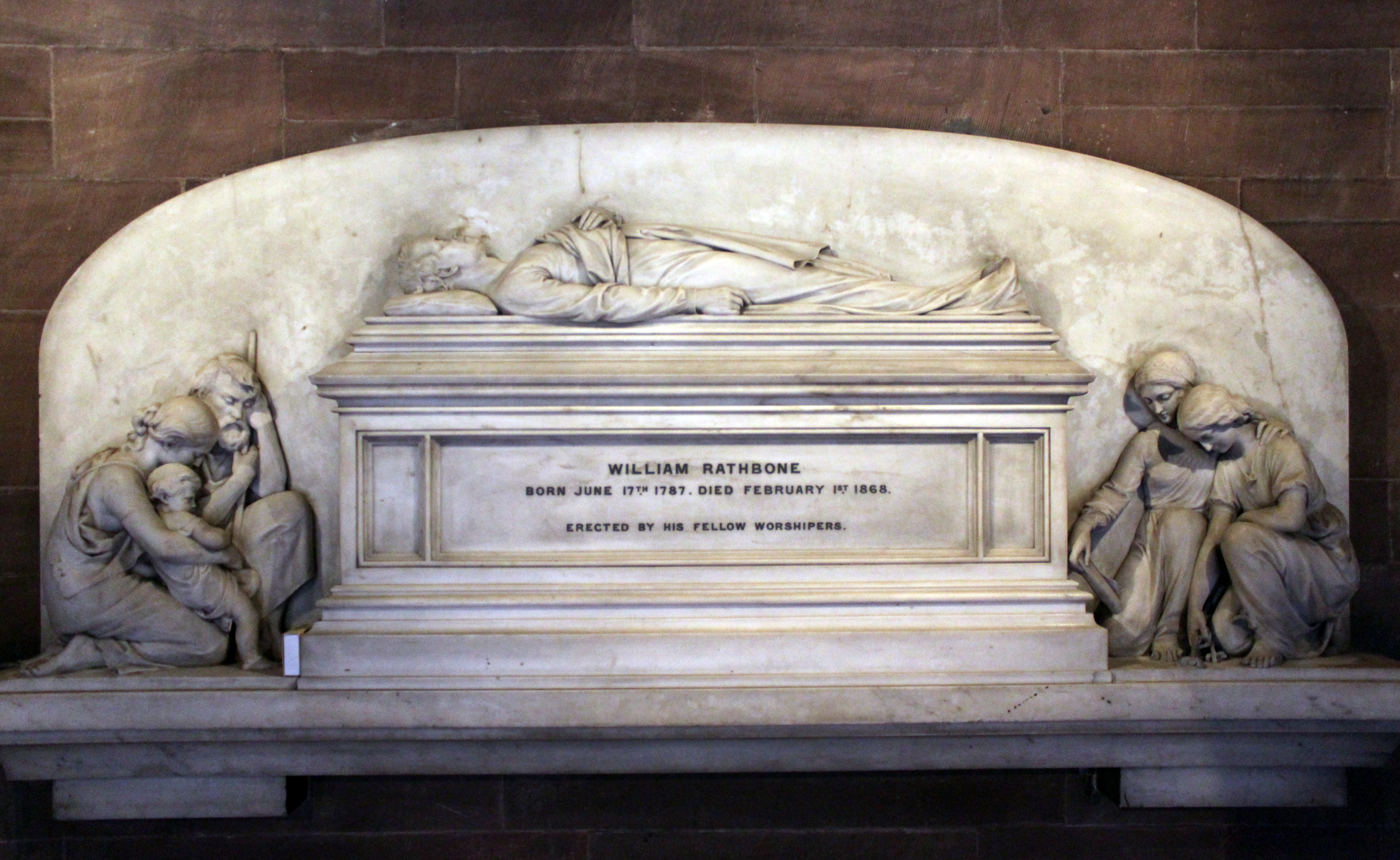
William Rathbone V memorial in cloister, by John Henry Foley

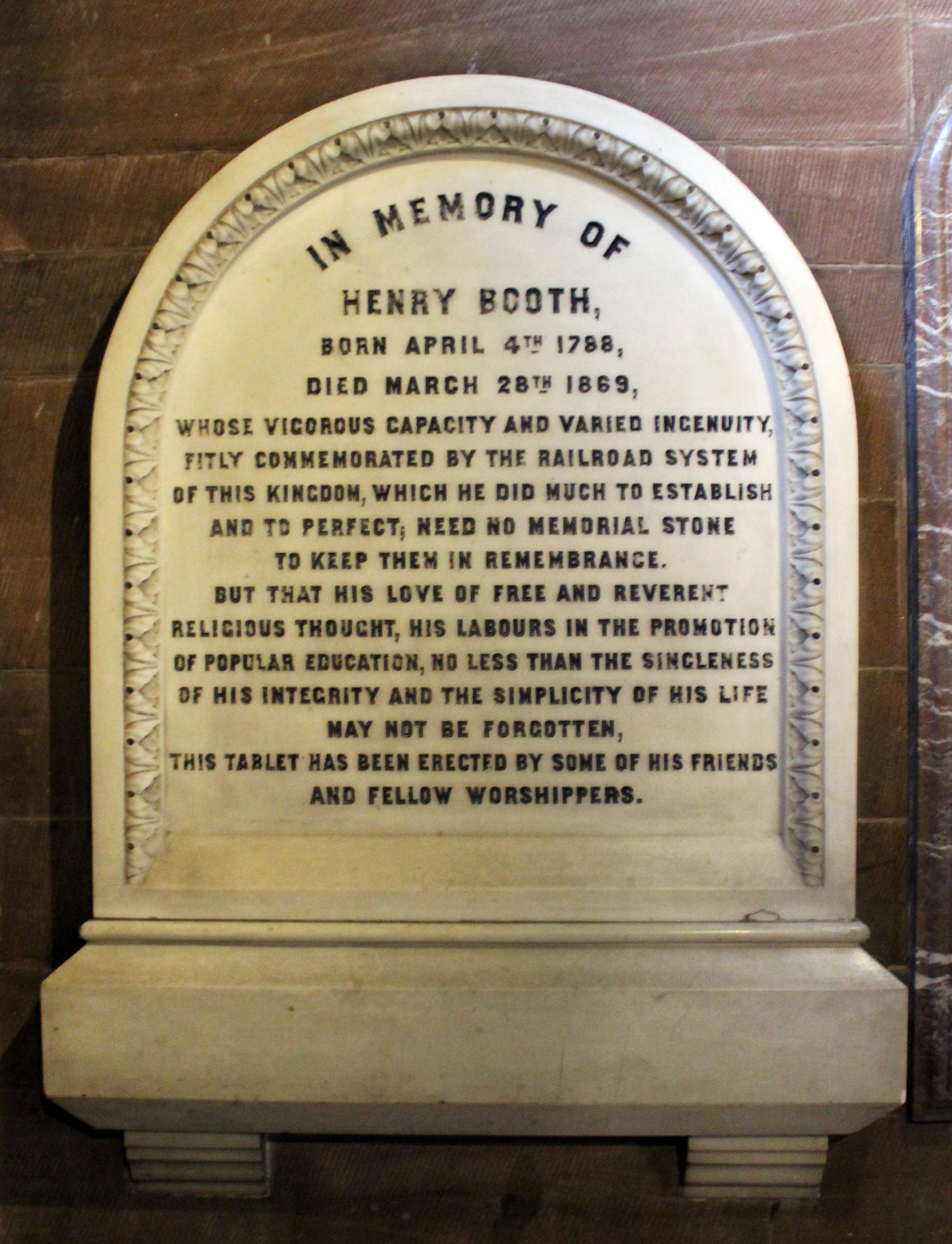
Memorial to Henry Booth, in cloister

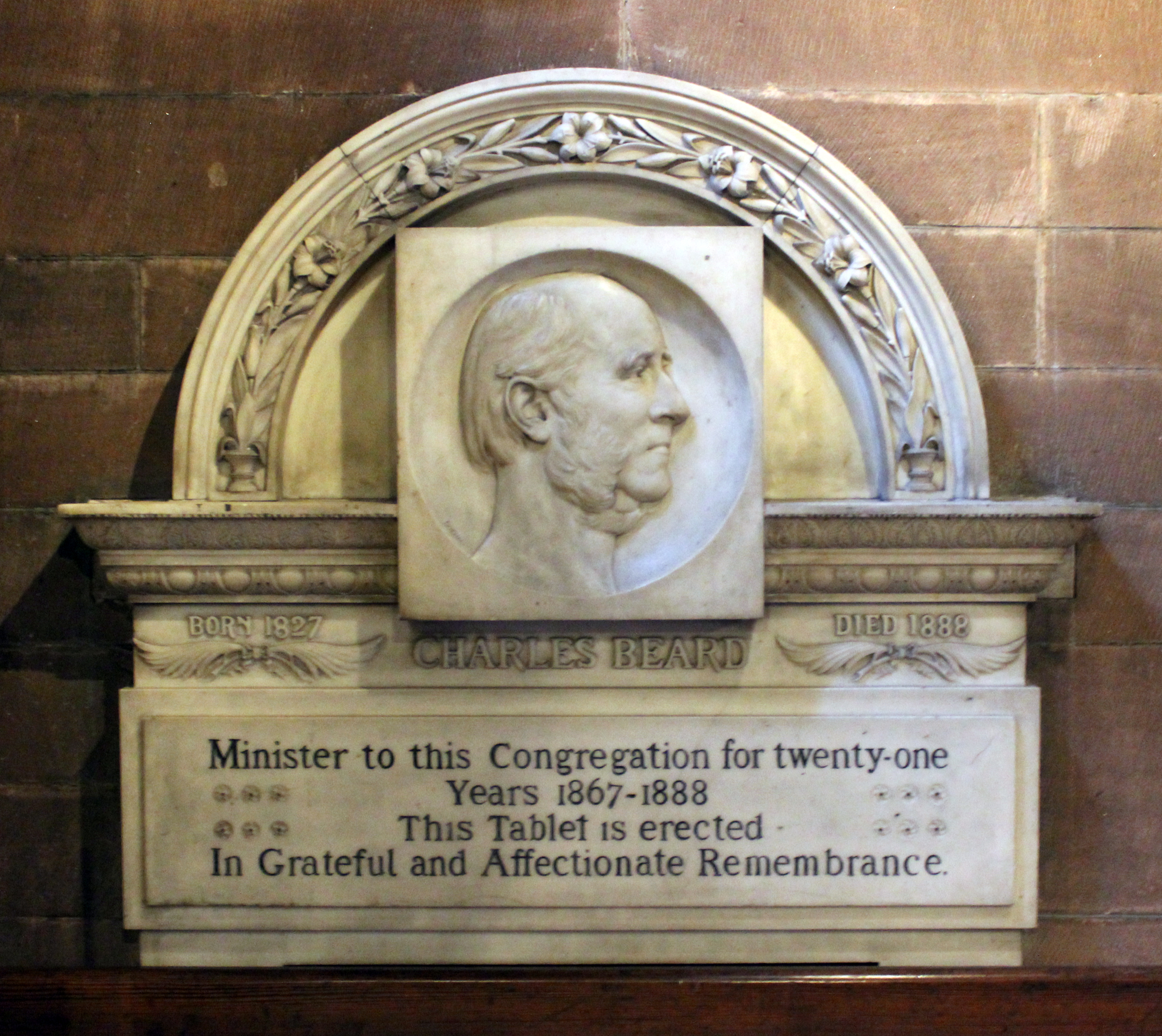
Memorial to Charles Beard, Minister of the church, in cloister, by Joseph Edgar Boehm

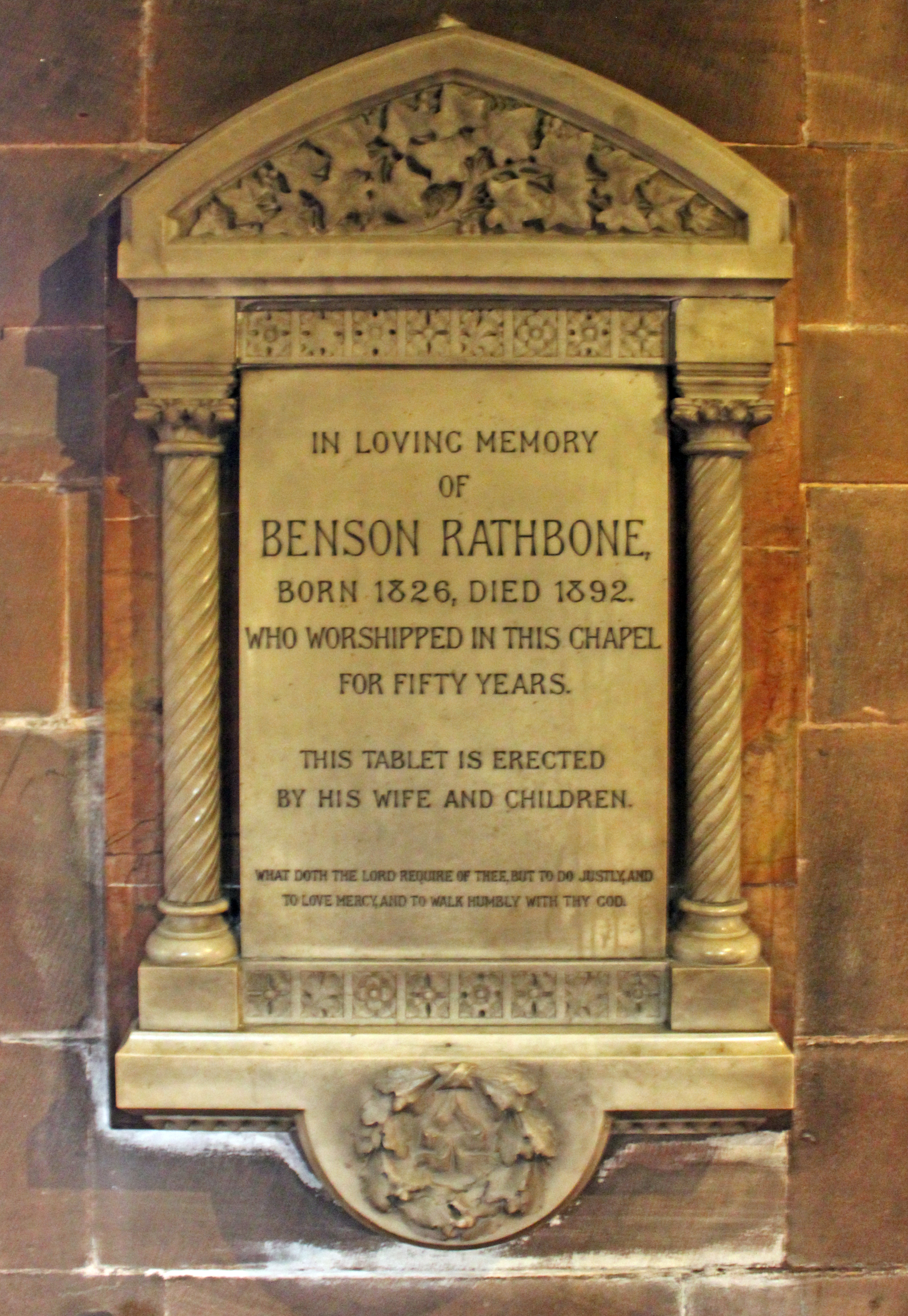
Memorial to Benson Rathbone, in cloister

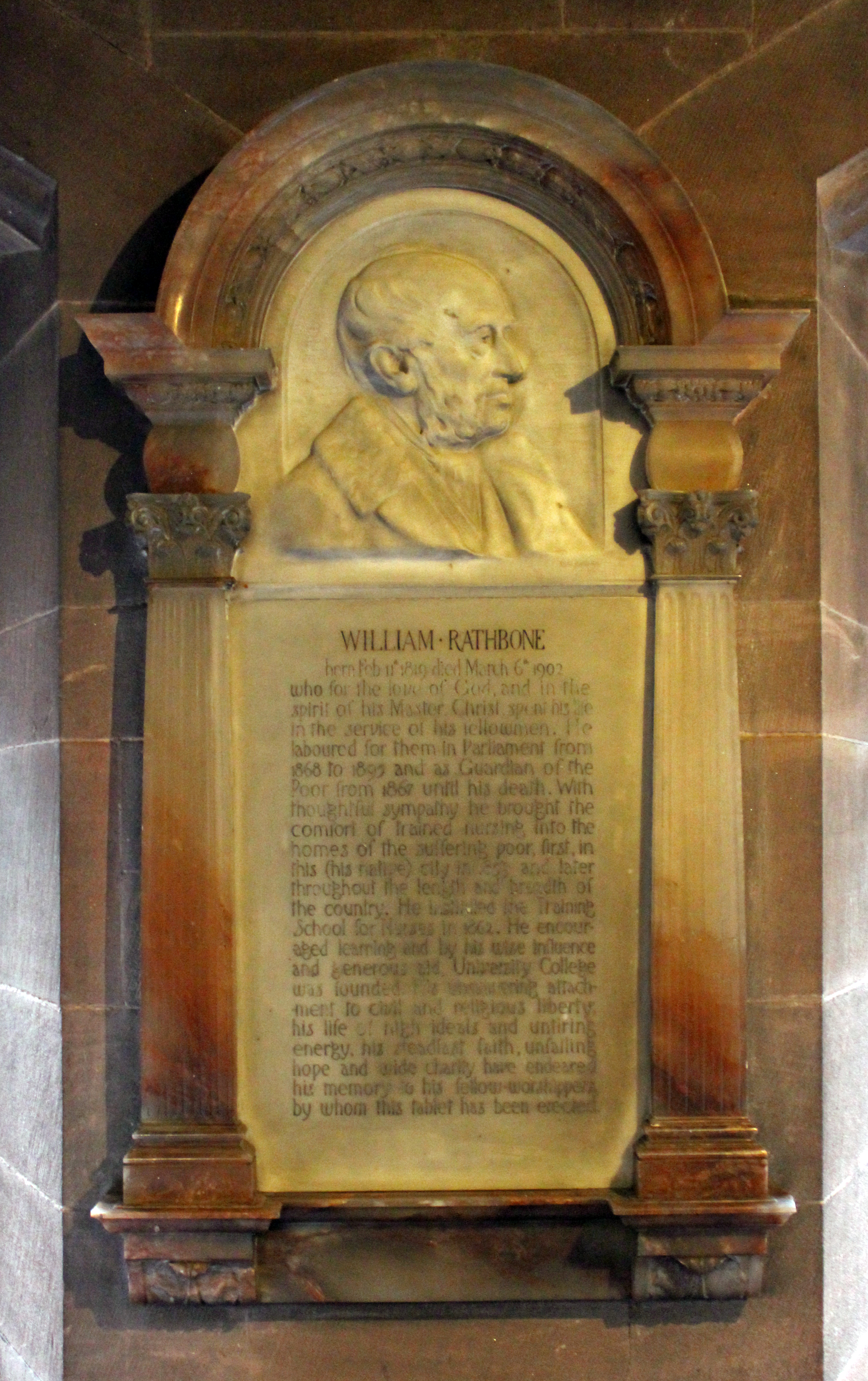
Memorial to William Rathbone VI, in cloister, by C.J. Allen

== See also ==
- Grade I listed buildings in Liverpool
- Grade I listed churches in Merseyside
- Toxteth Unitarian Chapel

== Bibliography ==
- Mooney, Len (1996), A Guide to Ullet Road Unitarian Church, Liverpool: Ullet Road Unitarian Church
- Pollard, Richard; Pevsner, Nikolaus (2006), Lancashire: Liverpool and the South-West, The Buildings of England, New Haven and London: Yale University Press, ISBN 0-300-10910-5
- Sharples, Joseph; Pollard, Richard (2004), Liverpool, Pevsner Architectural Guides, New Haven and London: Yale University Press, ISBN 0-300-10258-5
