= Childwall =

Suburb of Liverpool, England

Coordinates: 53.395°N 2.881°W

- All Saints' Church in October 2006

- Location within Merseyside
- Population: 13,640 (2019)
- OS grid reference: SJ414890
- Metropolitan borough: Liverpool
- Metropolitan county: Merseyside
- Region: North West
- Country: England
- Sovereign state: United Kingdom
- Post town: LIVERPOOL
- Postcode district: L16
- Dialling code: 0151
- Police: Merseyside
- Fire: Merseyside
- Ambulance: North West
- UK Parliament: Liverpool Wavertree

Childwall (/ˈtʃɪldwɔːl/) is a suburb and ward of Liverpool, in Merseyside, England, located to the southeast of the city. It is bordered by Belle Vale, Bowring Park, Broadgreen, Gateacre, Mossley Hill, and Wavertree. In 2019, the population was 13,640.

== Overview ==
The earliest recorded reference to Childwall was in the Domesday Book of 1086: "Four Radmans held Childwall as four Manors. There is half a hide. It was worth eight shillings. There was a priest, having half a carucate of land in frank almoign." Childwall was known as Cildeuuelle in the Domesday Book, meaning "the rampart (wall) of the young noble (Childe, one yet to win his spurs or be knighted) cf. the use of Childe by Browning and Byron" from the Old English words cild and wella. Historically, the name has been recorded as Childewalle (1212 and 1332), Chaldewall (1238), Childwall (1261), Childewelle (1291), Chaldewal (1305), and Childewall (1354).

Childwall was traditionally part of the West Derby Hundred. It was an urban district from the Local Government Act 1894 until Liverpool county borough annexed it on 9 November 1913. In 1921 the civil parish had a population of 144. On 1 April 1922 the parish was abolished and merged with Liverpool. The suburb's All Saints' Church is the oldest church in Liverpool. Though Childwall still maintains a large Jewish community, this has been in gradual decline since the 1980s, with some of the former Jewish community now living in the nearby suburbs of Allerton and Gateacre.

Childwall has a large roundabout called the Childwall Fiveways, which is one of the busiest in Liverpool. Since the year 2000, the area immediately surrounding the Fiveways has gradually developed into an area for bars and restaurants. Childwall's pubs include the Childwall Abbey Hotel, the Halfway House, and the Childwall Fiveways Hotel. Housing in Childwall is almost entirely detached or semi-detached, and there are very few terraced houses.

The television production company Lime Pictures, formerly Mersey Television, is headquartered on a patch of private land in Childwall Woods. The company's most notable productions are Hollyoaks, Brookside, Grange Hill, Geordie Shore, and The Only Way Is Essex. The first three are filmed in Childwall, while the last two are respectively filmed in Newcastle and Brentwood.

== Education ==
=== Primary schools ===
- Childwall Church of England Primary School
- King David Schools (encompassing a Nursery, Primary, High School, and Sixth Form)
- Our Lady's Bishop Eton Roman Catholic Primary & Junior School
- Rudston Infant & Junior School
- St Paschal Baylon Roman Catholic Primary School

=== Secondary schools ===
- Childwall Sports and Science Academy
- King David High School

=== Higher education ===
- Liverpool Hope University

== Transport ==
The nearest railway stations are Mossley Hill or Broadgreen. Historically, there was also Childwall railway station. Regular bus services connect the district with Liverpool John Lennon Airport and the city centre, as well as surrounding districts.

== Notable people ==
- Brian Barwick, sports team chairman
- Craig Charles, actor, lived in Childwall as a teenager
- Jodie Comer, actress, raised in Childwall
- Edwina Currie, politician
- Les Dennis, television presenter, partly raised in Childwall
- Brian Epstein, manager of the Beatles, raised in Childwall
- Jon Flanagan, footballer
- Alex Fletcher, actress, born in Childwall
- Samantha Giles, actress, lived in Childwall whilst filming Hollyoaks
- Jason Isaacs, actor, partly raised in Childwall
- Simon Jones, musician, partly raised in Childwall
- Jeremiah Markland, classical scholar, born in Childwall
- Ray Quinn, actor, singer, born in Childwall
- Ian St John, footballer, lived in Childwall while playing for Liverpool
- Dai Davies, footballer, lived in Childwall while playing for Everton in 1970s

== Governance ==
Childwall is within the Liverpool Wavertree parliamentary constituency, and is represented by Paula Barker MP (Labour).

The district of Childwall is in the Liverpool City Council ward of Childwall. As of 2023, the ward is represented by Mike Storey and Pat Moloney (Liberal Democrats).
