= List of public art in Liverpool =

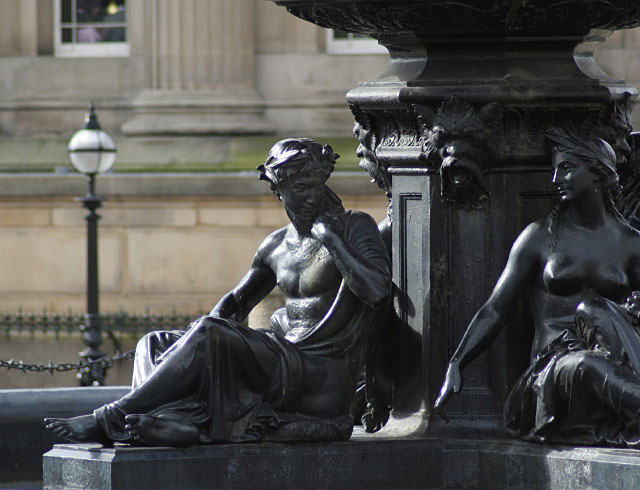
Acis and Galatea on the Steble Fountain

The city of Liverpool has a greater number of public sculptures than any other location in the United Kingdom aside from Westminster. Early examples include works by George Frampton, Goscombe John, Thomas Thornycroft, Charles Bell Birch, Richard Westmacott, Francis Chantrey, John Gibson, Thomas Brock and F.W. Pomeroy, while Barbara Hepworth, Jacob Epstein, Mitzi Cunliffe and Elisabeth Frink provide some of the modern offerings. More recently, local artist Tom Murphy has created a dozen sculptures in Liverpool.

While statues and sculpture are dotted throughout the inner city, there are four primary groupings: inside and around St George's Hall; in St John's Gardens; around the Pier Head; and around the Palm House at Sefton Park. Smaller groups are found in Old Hall Street/Exchange Flags and in and around The Oratory.

The Queen Victoria Monument at Derby Square, an ensemble of 26 bronze figures by C. J. Allen, is described in the Liverpool Pevsner Architectural Guide as one of the most ambitious British monuments to the Queen.

NB: the following list does not include the comprehensive collections held by National Museums Liverpool, or the countless ornate features of many Liverpool buildings.

== Royalty ==
Image	Title / subject	Location and coordinates	Date	Artist / designer	Type	Material	Dimensions	Designation	Wikidata	Notes
More images	George III	Monument Place, London Road	1822	Richard Westmacott	Equestrian statue on pedestal	Bronze & stone		Grade II	Q26629818	
More images	Prince Albert	St. George's Hall	1866	Thomas Thornycroft	Equestrian statue on pedestal	Bronze & stone		Grade II	Q2633144	
More images	Queen Victoria	St. George's Hall	1869	Thomas Thornycroft	Equestrian statue on pedestal	Bronze & stone		Grade II	Q26643648	
More images	Queen Victoria Monument	Derby Square	1906	C. J. Allen	26 statues with canopy, pedestal, stepped base	Bronze & stone		Grade II	Q7926878	
More images	Edward VII	Pier Head	1916	Goscombe John	Equestrian statue on pedestal	Bronze		Grade II	Q26320984	
More images	George V	Entrance to Queensway Tunnel	1939	Goscombe John	Statue	Bronze				
More images	Queen Mary	Entrance to Queensway Tunnel	1939	Goscombe John	Statue	Bronze				

== Statesmen and politicians ==
Image	Title / subject	Location and coordinates	Date	Artist / designer	Type	Material	Dimensions	Designation	Wikidata	Notes
	William Huskisson	The Oratory	1831	John Gibson		Marble		Grade II		Originally stood inside the Huskisson Memorial in nearby St James's Cemetery
	George Canning	Interior of Liverpool Town Hall	1832	Francis Chantrey	Statue	Marble				
	William Ewart	The Oratory	1832	Joseph Gott	Seated statue on pedestal	Marble				
More images	William Huskisson	Dukes Terrace car-park	1847	John Gibson	Statue on pedestal	Bronze & granite		Grade II	Q26672851	
More images	Robert Peel	Interior of St. George's Hall	1853	Matthew Noble	Statue	Marble				
More images	William Ewart Gladstone	Interior of St. George's Hall	1868	John Adams-Acton	Statue	Marble			Q114931838	
More images	Edward Smith-Stanley, 14th Earl of Derby	Interior of St. George's Hall	1869	William Theed	Statue	Marble			Q114932213	
More images	Samuel Robert Graves	Interior of St. George's Hall	1875	Giovanni Fontana	Statue	Marble			Q114931462	
More images	Benjamin Disraeli	St. George's Hall	1883	Charles Bell Birch	Statue on pedestal	Bronze		Grade II	Q26643647	
More images	Edward Whitley	Interior of St. George's Hall	1895	Albert Bruce Joy	Statue	Marble			Q114917690	
More images	Arthur Bower Forwood	St John's Gardens	1903	George Frampton	Statue on pedestal	Bronze & stone		Grade II	Q26643650	
More images	William Ewart Gladstone	St John's Gardens	1904	Thomas Brock	Statue on pedestal, relief panel & 2 statues at base	Bronze		Grade II	Q26333153	
More images	Frederick Stanley, 16th Earl of Derby	Interior of St. George's Hall	1911	F. W. Pomeroy	Statue	Marble			Q114932527	
More images	Archibald Salvidge	Queensway Tunnel portal	After 1928	Edward Carter Preston	Relief medallion	Stone				
More images	Bessie Braddock	Lime Street station	2009	Tom Murphy	Statue	Bronze				

== Military and war memorials ==
Image	Title / subject	Location and coordinates	Date	Artist / designer	Type	Material	Dimensions	Designation	Wikidata	Notes
More images	Nelson Monument	Exchange Flags	1813	Matthew Cotes Wyatt & Richard Westmacott	Sculpture group on pedestal and base	Bronze, marble & stone	8.8m high	Grade II*	Q4343277	
More images	Wellington's Column	Corner of Lime Street & William Brown Street	1863	George Anderson Lawson	Statue on Doric column, pedestal & steps	Bronze & stone	40m high	Grade II*	Q1720584	
More images	William Earle	St. George's Hall	1887	Charles Bell Birch	Statue on pedestal	Bronze & stone	6.4m high	Grade II	Q26333142	
More images	The King's Regiment memorial	St John's Gardens	1905	Goscombe John	Statues with pedestal, base & wall	Bronze & stone		Grade II	Q26333154	Cast at AB Burton foundry; built by William Kirkpatrick Ltd.
More images	Memorial to Heroes of the Marine Engine Room	Pier Head	1916	Goscombe John	Obelisk with statues	Bronze & stone		Grade II*	Q3305518	
More images	Cunard War Memorial	Cunard Building, Pier Head	1921	Arthur Davis and Henry Alfred Pegram	Statue on column	Copper & granite		Grade II	Q26304089	
More images	Cotton Association war memorial	Walker House, Exchange Flags	1922	Francis Derwent Wood	Statue & plaque	Bronze		Grade II	Q66478442	Relocated in 2013 from the Cotton Exchange Building.
More images	Exchange Newsroom memorial	Exchange Flags	1924	Joseph Phillips	Sculpture group, base & plaque	Bronze & stone		Grade II	Q96607282	
More images	Post Office Workers memorial	Metquarter, Victoria Street	1924	Herbert Tyson Smith	Statue & plaques	Limestone	1.6m high	Not listed		
More images	Liverpool Cenotaph	St. George's Hall	1930	Lionel Bailey Budden & Herbert Tyson Smith	Rectangular Cenotaph, relief panels & stepped base	Stone & bronze	18.6m long, 4.6m high	Grade I	Q15794860	
More images	Jet of Iada London Blitz Search and Rescue dog	Calderstones Park	1949		Pillar with plaque	Stone and cast metal	1.2m tall			
More images	Liverpool Naval Memorial	Pier Head	1952	Herbert Tyson Smith	Column, base & surrounding walls	Cement & Portland stone		Grade II	Q19840374	Architects, Stanley Harold Smith & Charles Frederick Blythin.
More images	Black Merchant Seamen War Memorial	Falkner Square	1993	Alan Roberts Ltd	Stone of Remembrance	Sandstone				
More images	Merchant Navy memorial	Pier Head	1998	John Shimmin	Cenotaph	Portland stone			Q54328883	D Strachan & Burkey, masons.
More images	Frederic John Walker DSO***	Pier Head	1998	Tom Murphy	Statue	Bronze				
More images	Liverpool Blitz memorial	Our Lady & St Nicholas Church garden, Pier Head	2000	Tom Murphy	Sculpture group	Bronze				
More images	Noel Godfrey Chavasse VC*	Abercromby Square	2008	Tom Murphy	Plaque	Slate				
More images	Victoria Cross recipients	Abercromby Square	2008	Tom Murphy	Sculpture group	Bronze				
More images	Christmas truce 1914	Church of St Luke, Liverpool	2014	Andy Edwards	Sculpture group	fibreglass				

== Business and inventors ==
Image	Title / subject	Location and coordinates	Date	Artist / designer	Type	Material	Dimensions	Designation	Wikidata	Notes
More images	George Stephenson	Interior of St. George's Hall	1851	John Gibson	Statue	Marble				
More images	William Mackenzie	St Andrew's Church, Rodney Street	1868		Pyramid	Granite		Grade II	Q93227470	
	Henry Booth	Northern entrance to St. George's Hall	1874	William Theed	Statue	Marble				
More images	André Le Nôtre	The Palm House, Sefton Park	1899	Léon-Joseph Chavalliaud	Statue	Marble				
More images	John and Cecil Moores	Church Street	1996	Tom Murphy	Two statues	Bronze				
More images	John Moores	Courtyard of Avril Roberts Library, Tithebarn Street	1998	Tom Murphy	Statue on plinth	Bronze				

== Sports ==
Image	Title / subject	Location and coordinates	Date	Artist / designer	Type	Material	Dimensions	Designation	Wikidata	Notes
More images	Bill Shankly	Liverpool Football Club	1997	Tom Murphy	Statue	Bronze				
More images	Dixie Dean	Everton Football Club	2001	Tom Murphy	Statue	Bronze				
More images	John Hulley	Coburg Wharf	2019	Tom Murphy	Statue	Bronze				

== Artists and entertainers ==
Image	Title / subject	Location and coordinates	Date	Artist / designer	Type	Material	Dimensions	Designation	Wikidata	Notes
More images	Michelangelo	Outside of Walker Art Gallery	1877	John Warrington Wood	Statue	Marble				Statue is badly weathered
More images	Raphael	Outside of Walker Art Gallery	1877	John Warrington Wood	Statue	Marble				Statue is badly weathered
More images	Four lads who shook the world	Mathew Street	1974	Arthur Dooley	Wall-mounted statue	Metal				
More images	John Lennon	Liverpool John Lennon Airport	2002	Tom Murphy	Statue	Bronze				
More images	Billy Fury	Albert Dock	2003	Tom Murphy	Statue	Bronze				
More images	Ken Dodd	Lime Street Station	2009	Tom Murphy	Statue	Bronze				
More images	John Lennon	Mathew Street	1996	David Webster	Statue	Bronze				
More images	The Beatles	Pier Head	2015	Andy Edwards	Statue group	Bronze	1.5 x life-size		Q113698986	Cast at Castle Fine Art Foundry,
More images	Cilla Black	Mathew Street	2017	Andy Edwards	Statue	Bronze				

== Religious figures ==
Image	Title / subject	Location and coordinates	Date	Artist / designer	Type	Material	Dimensions	Designation	Wikidata	Notes
	Kneeling Madonna	Inside the Anglican Cathedral	15th century	Giovanni della Robbia	Statue	Wood				
	Holy Family	Inside the Anglican Cathedral	2009	Josefina de Vasconcellos	Statue	Marble				
	Christ on a Donkey	Previously outside the Sailors' Church, Pier Head	1972	Brian Burgess	Equestrian statue	Fibreglass and metal				This work suffered damage and its whereabouts are currently unknown, presumed lost
	Our Lady of the Quays	Church of Our Lady and Saint Nicholas, Liverpool, "The Sailors Church", Pier Head		Arthur Dooley	Statue	Bronze				
	Abraham	Inside Liverpool Metropolitan Cathedral	1991	Sean Rice	Statue	Bronze				
More images	The Risen Christ	Above the North Door, Anglican Cathedral	1993	Elisabeth Frink	Statue	Bronze				
	Christ Risen	Inside the Metropolitan Cathedral		Arthur Dooley	Statue	Bronze				
	Madonna	Inside the Gustav Adolf Church		Arthur Dooley	Statue	Bronze				
	Christ	Inside the Gustav Adolf Church		Arthur Dooley	Statue	Bronze				

== Explorers and geographers ==
Image	Title / subject	Location and coordinates	Date	Artist / designer	Type	Material	Dimensions	Designation	Wikidata	Notes
More images	Henry the Navigator	Sefton Park	1898	Léon-Joseph Chavalliaud	Statue on pedestal	Bronze				
More images	Gerardus Mercator	Sefton Park	1898	Léon-Joseph Chavalliaud	Statue on pedestal	Bronze				
More images	Christopher Columbus	Sefton Park	1898	Léon-Joseph Chavalliaud	Statue on pedestal	Bronze				
More images	Captain Cook	Sefton Park	1898	Léon-Joseph Chavalliaud	Statue on pedestal	Bronze				
	Speed Amy Johnson	George's Dock ventilation and control station, Pier Head	1934	Edmund Thompson	Relief sculpture	Portland stone		Grade II		

== Educationists, scientists and philosophers ==
Image	Title / subject	Location and coordinates	Date	Artist / designer	Type	Material	Dimensions	Designation	Wikidata	Notes
More images	Charles Darwin	Sefton Park	1898	Léon-Joseph Chavalliaud	Statue on pedestal	Marble				
More images	John Parkinson	Sefton Park	1899	Léon-Joseph Chavalliaud	Statue on pedestal	Marble				
More images	Carl Linnaeus	Sefton Park	1899	Léon-Joseph Chavalliaud	Statue on pedestal	Marble				
More images	Sir Oliver Lodge	Base of the Victoria Monument in Derby Square.	1906	C. J. Allen	Statue group	Bronze				
More images	Florence Nightingale	Princes Road, Liverpool	1913	C. J. Allen	Relief with panels & surround	Stone		Grade II	Q26647476	Architects;- Edward Willink & Philip Coldwell Thicknesse
More images	Jung	Mathew Street	1993	Jonathon Drabkin	Bust	Bronze				Replaced an earlier version
More images	Henry Egerton Cotton	John Moores University, Trueman Street	1998	Tom Murphy	Statue	Bronze				
	Jeremiah Horrocks	Pier Head	2011	Andy Plant	Sculpture					

== Philanthropists and clergy ==
Image	Title / subject	Location and coordinates	Date	Artist / designer	Type	Material	Dimensions	Designation	Wikidata	Notes
More images	William Roscoe	Inside St. George's Hall	1841	Francis Chantrey	Statue	Marble				
More images	Jonathan Brooks	Inside St. George's Hall	1858	Benjamin Edward Spence	Statue	Marble			Q114930826	
More images	Sir William Brown	Inside St. George's Hall	1860	Patrick MacDowell	Statue	Marble				
	Agnes Jones	Inside The Oratory	1868	Pietro Tenerani	Statue	Marble				
More images	Joseph Mayer	Inside St. George's Hall	1869	Giovanni Fontana	Statue	Marble				
More images	Hugh Boyd M‘Neile	Inside St. George's Hall	1870	George Gamon Adams	Statue	Marble			Q114933060	
More images	William Rathbone V	Sefton Park	1877	John Henry Foley and Thomas Brock	Statue on pedestal with plaques	Portland stone & bronze		Grade II	Q26333129	Statue by Foley, pedestal by Brock
More images	Alexander Balfour	St John's Gardens	1889	Albert Bruce Joy	Statue on pedestal	Bronze & stone		Grade II	Q26504972	
More images	William Rathbone VI	St John's Gardens	1899	George Frampton	Statue on pedestal	Bronze & stone		Grade II	Q26333151	
More images	James Nugent	St John's Gardens	1906	F. W. Pomeroy	Statue on pedestal	Bronze & stone		Grade II	Q26504982	
More images	Canon Thomas Major Lester	St John's Gardens	1907	George Frampton	Statue on pedestal	Bronze & stone		Grade II	Q26504975	
More images	Derek Worlock part of the Sheppard-Worlock Statue	Hope Street	2008	Stephen Broadbent	Relief sculpture	Bronze	4.5m high		Q7494526	
More images	David Sheppard part of the Sheppard-Worlock Statue	Hope Street	2008	Stephen Broadbent	Relief sculpture	Bronze	4.5m high		Q7494526	
More images	Kitty Wilkinson	Inside St. George's Hall	2012	Simon Smith	Statue	Marble			Q114932716	First new statue in St. George's Hall in over 100 years and the first depicting a woman.

== Fictional, poetical and allegorical characters ==
Image	Title / subject	Location and coordinates	Date	Artist / designer	Type	Material	Dimensions	Designation	Wikidata	Notes
More images	Minerva	Above Liverpool Town Hall	1802	John Charles Felix Rossi	Statue	Marble				Figure may represent Britannia
More images	Highland Mary	Inside the Palm House, Sefton Park	1850	Benjamin Spence	Statue on pedestal	Marble				
More images	The Angel's Whisper	Inside the Palm House, Sefton Park	1857	Benjamin Spence	Statue	Marble				
More images	Spirit of Liverpool	Roof of Walker Art Gallery	1877	John Warrington Wood	Statue	Marble				Original was removed in 1993 to the National Conservation Centre, and a copy made from Chinese marble
More images	Neptune, Amphitrite, Acis and Galatea	Steble Fountain outside St. George's Hall	1879	Michel Joseph Napoléon Liénard	Sculptural group in fountain	Bronze		Grade II*	Q7605557	
More images	Justice and Truth	Gladstone memorial in St. John's Gardens	1904	Thomas Brock	Statues on base of monument	Bronze		Grade II	Q26333153	
More images	Britannia	The King's Regiment memorial in St John's Gardens	1905	Goscombe John		Bronze		Grade II	Q26333154	
More images	Navigation, Commerce and The River Mersey, (shown).	Inside and outside the Cotton Exchange, Old Hall Street	1906	William Birnie Rhind & E. O. Griffith	3 Sculptures	Portland stone				Badly weathered, these colossal sculptures originally adorned the roof
More images	Justice, Wisdom, Charity, Peace, Education, Industry, Commerce, Agriculture and Fame	Queen Victoria Monument, Derby Square	1906	C. J. Allen	26 statues & sculptural groups	Bronze		Grade II	Q7926878	
More images	Liver Birds	Towers of the Royal Liver Building	1911	Carl Bernard Bartels	Two statues	Bronze				
More images	Liverpool, Research and The Fruits of Industry	Alfred Lewis Jones Memorial, Pier Head	1913	George Frampton	3 statues on base of monument	Bronze		Grade II	Q26320985	
More images	Victory	Cunard War Memorial, Pier Head	1921	Henry Alfred Pegram	Statue on column	Copper		Grade II	Q26304089	
More images	Peter Pan	Sefton Park	1928	George Frampton	Statue	Bronze		Grade II	Q26315882	
More images	Eros	Sefton Park	1932	Alfred Gilbert	Statue & fountain	Aluminium		Grade II	Q26315880	A modern copy; the original bronze is on display at the Conservation Centre
More images	Night & Day	George's Dock ventilation and control station, George's Dock Way	1934	Edmund Thompson	Sculpture reliefs	Black basalt		Grade II	Q26482399	
More images	Liverpool Resurgent	Former Lewis's department store, Ranelagh Street	1956	Jacob Epstein	Statue	Bronze	5.4m tall	Grade II	Q42852357	
More images	Untitled - Childhood scenes	Former Lewis's department store, Ranelagh Street	1956	Jacob Epstein	3 Relief panels	Ciment fondu		Grade II		
More images	Eleanor Rigby	Stanley Street	1982	Tommy Steele	Statue	Bronze			Q16834884	
More images	Mother and Child	Liverpool Women's Hospital, Crown Street	1999	Terry McDonald	Statue	Bronze				
More images	Superlambanana	Tithebarn Street	1998	Taro Chiezo and local artists	Statue	Concrete and fibreglass				Numerous replicas are dotted throughout the city
More images	Legacy Sculpture	Albert Dock	2001	Mark DeGraffenried	Statue group	Bronze				

== Animals ==
Image	Title / subject	Location and coordinates	Date	Artist / designer	Type	Material	Dimensions	Designation	Wikidata	Notes
More images	Goat & Kid	Inside the Palm House, Sefton Park	c.1867	Giovita Lombardi	Statue	Marble				
More images	Four Recumbent Lions	Outside St. George's Hall, St George's Plateau	1855	William Grinsell Nicholl	4 Sculptures	Stone		Grade II	Q26333145	
	Red Rum	Aintree Racecourse	1987	Philip Blacker	Equine sculpture	Bronze				
	Temple lions or fu-dogs (3 pairs)	Berry, Nelson & Great George Streets, Chinatown	2000	Mr. Zhang of Shanghai	Sculpture	Bronze				
More images	The Great Escape	Canning Place, next to Merseyside Police Headquarters	2000	Edward Cronshaw	Group sculpture	Bronze				
	The Roman Standard	Outside The Oratory	2005	Tracey Emin	Sculpture of a bird on a staff	Bronze				
More images	Liverpool Carters Working Horse monument	Outside of Museum of Liverpool	2010	Judy Boyt	Equine sculpture					

== Abstract sculpture ==
Image	Title / subject	Location and coordinates	Date	Artist / designer	Type	Material	Dimensions	Designation	Wikidata	Notes
	The Quickening	Rear of Civic Design Building, Liverpool University	1951	Mitzi Cunliffe	Sculpture	Portland stone				
	Three Uprights	University Extension, Chatham Street	1959	Hubert Dalwood	Sculpture	Aluminium				
	Seven Seas	Pier Head	1966	Stanley English	Sculpture	Metal				
More images	Squares with Two Circles	Abercromby Square	1969	Barbara Hepworth	Sculpture	Bronze and concrete				
	Cormorants Diving	Inside the Atlantic Tower Hotel	1972	Sean Rice	Statue	Metal				
	Seagulls Rising	Courtyard of the Atlantic Tower Hotel	1972	Sean Rice	Statue	Metal				
More images	Red Between	Quadrangle of the Victoria Gallery & Museum, Liverpool University	1973	Phillip King	Sculpture	Painted metal				
More images	Palanzana	Byrom Street	1984	Stephen Cox	Sculpture	Stone				
More images	Tango	Concert Square	1984	Allen Jones	Sculpture	Metal				
More images	Sea Circle	Seymour Street	1984	Charlotte Mayer	Statue	Bronze				
More images	Raleigh	Outside the Tate Liverpool, Albert Dock	1986	Tony Cragg	Statue	Stone and metal				
More images	Reconciliation	Concert Street	1990	Stephen Broadbent	Statue	Metal				
More images	Ray + Julie	London Road	1995	Alan Dunn and Brigitte Jurack	Two part sculpture	Metal				
More images	A Case History	Hope Street	1998	John King	Sculpture	Stone				
More images	The Seed	Campbell Street	2002	Stephen Broadbent	Sculpture	Metal				
	Connections	Outside Beetham Tower, Old Hall Street	2004	Stephen Broadbent	Sculpture	Steel, concrete, timber, glass				
More images	Penelope	Wolstenholme Square	2006	Jorge Pardo	Statue	Metal				
	Skyline	New Quay	2007	Oliver Barratt	Sculpture	Metal				
More images	Turning the Place Over	Moorfields	2007	Richard Wilson	Mobile ovoid segment of a disused building	Stone, iron & glass				
More images	Peace & Harmony, the John Lennon Peace Monument	Kings Dock	2010	Lauren Voiers	Sculpture	Metal and glass			Q6244561	
	Irish Famine Memorial	St Luke's Gardens, Leece Street	1998	Eamonn O'Docherty	Sculpture	Granite and bronze				Funded by public subscription
	Liverpool Plinth	Church of Our Lady and Saint Nicholas, Liverpool		Various	Sculpture					Annual competition

== See also ==
- Architecture of Liverpool
