= Memorial to Heroes of the Marine Engine Room =

Monument in England

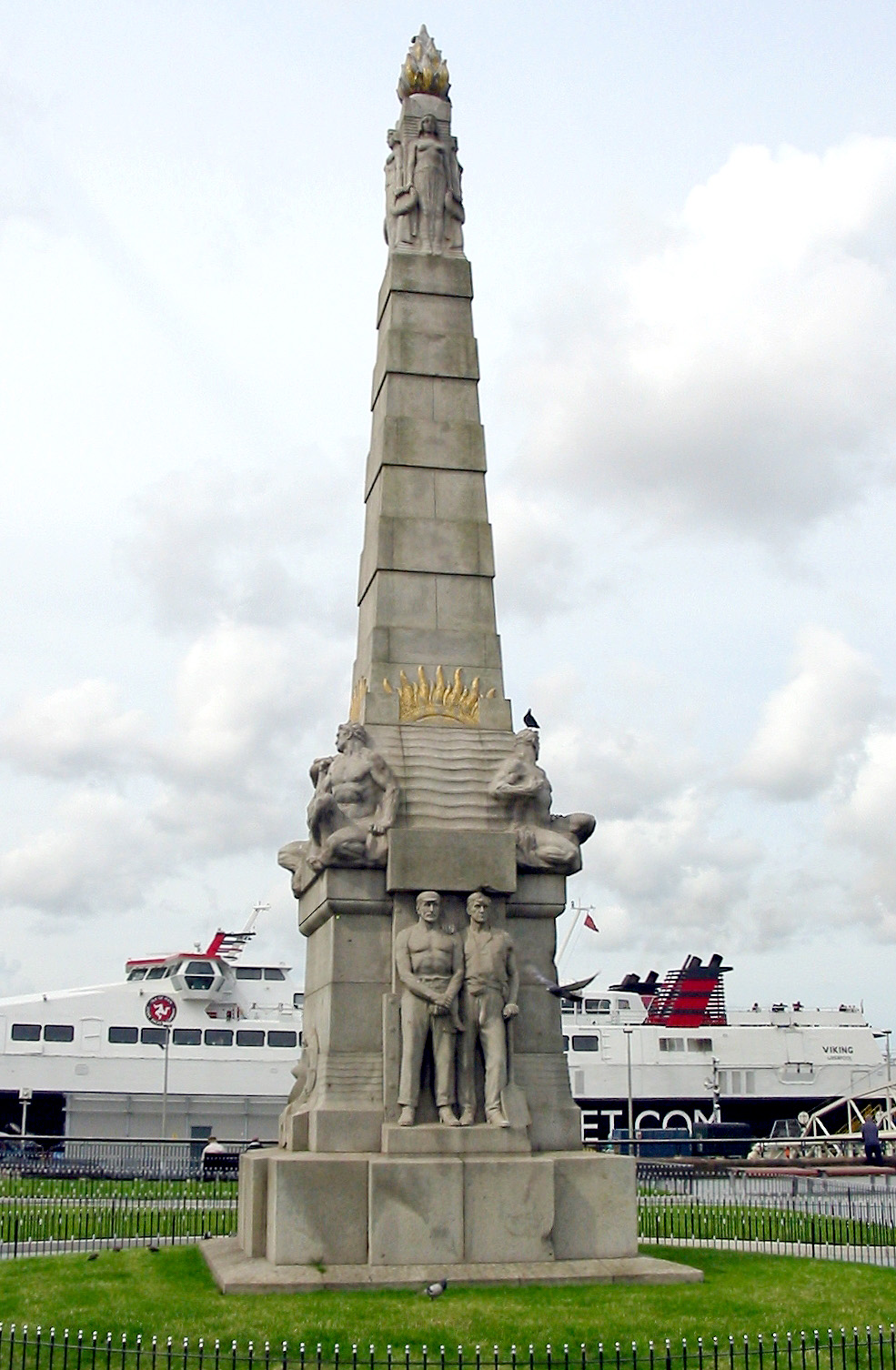
- The memorial in 2008

General information
- Address: St Nicholas Place, Pier Head, Liverpool, England
- Coordinates: 53°24′22″N 2°59′53″W
- Year(s) built: 1916

Design and construction
- Architect(s): Sir William Goscombe John
- Designations

Listed Building – Grade II*
- Official name: Memorial to Heroes of the Marine Engine Room
- Designated: 14 March 1975
- Reference no.: 1209973

The Memorial to Heroes of the Marine Engine Room is a Grade II* listed granite monument located on St Nicholas Place, at the Pier Head, in Liverpool, England.

== History ==
The memorial was intended originally to commemorate all 32 engineers who died in the sinking of Titanic on 15 April 1912. Liverpool was the Titanic's port of registry, as well as the home of the ship's owner, White Star Line. Construction was funded by international public subscription.

Spaces were left on the monument to record the names of other engineers. However, due to the heavy loss of life throughout World War I, its dedication was broadened to include all maritime engine room fatalities incurred during the performance of duty. Shrapnel damage from bombs that fell during the Blitz in World War II can be clearly seen on the monument.

== Design ==
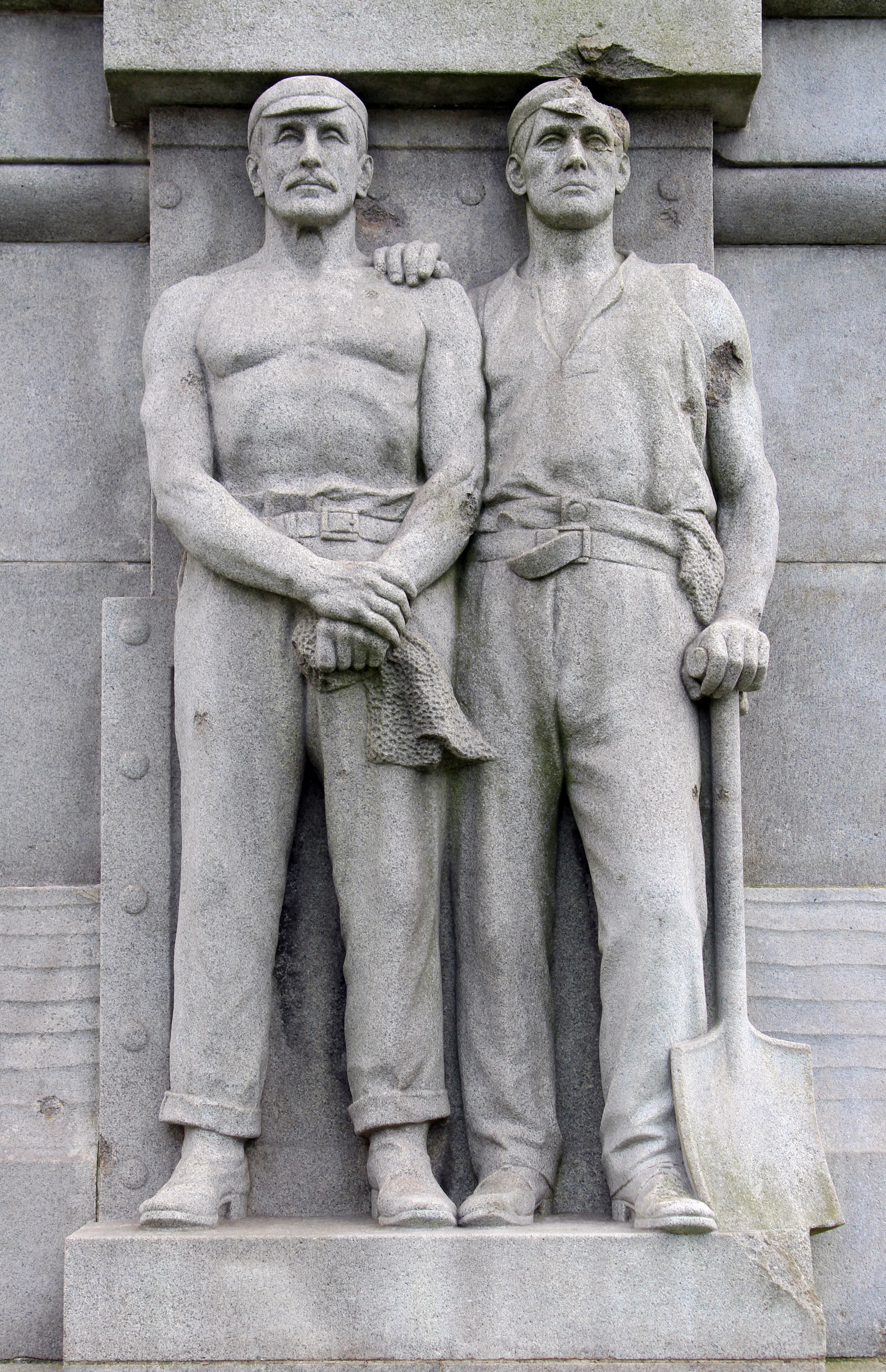
Two figures on the east face of the memorial representing stokers, one holding a shovel and the other a cleaning rag. The right figure shows damage from the Liverpool Blitz.

Standing 48 feet (14.6 m) tall, the monument was designed by Sir William Goscombe John. It is constructed in the form of a granite obelisk standing on a square chamfered pedestal. The obelisk is topped with a gilded flame. Each of its bottom corners is decorated with carved representations of the four classical elements.

The east and west side of the pedestal feature carved life-size sculptures of stokers and engineers. Pevsner describes these figures as "strikingly naturalistic" and are noted as focusing on working class heroism. When the monument was designed, the use of manual labourers and workers was an uncommon subject in British public art and their inclusion by Goscombe John was considered innovative. Historic England describe the memorial as having a considerable influence on the future design of war memorials, calling it "one of the most artistically significant memorials to the Titanic disaster on either side of the Atlantic".

== See also ==
- Grade II* listed buildings in Liverpool – City Centre
- Grade II* listed war memorials in England
- List of statues and sculptures in Liverpool
