= Sheppard-Worlock Statue =

Statue in Liverpool, United Kingdom

Coordinates: 53°24′3″N 2°58′15″W

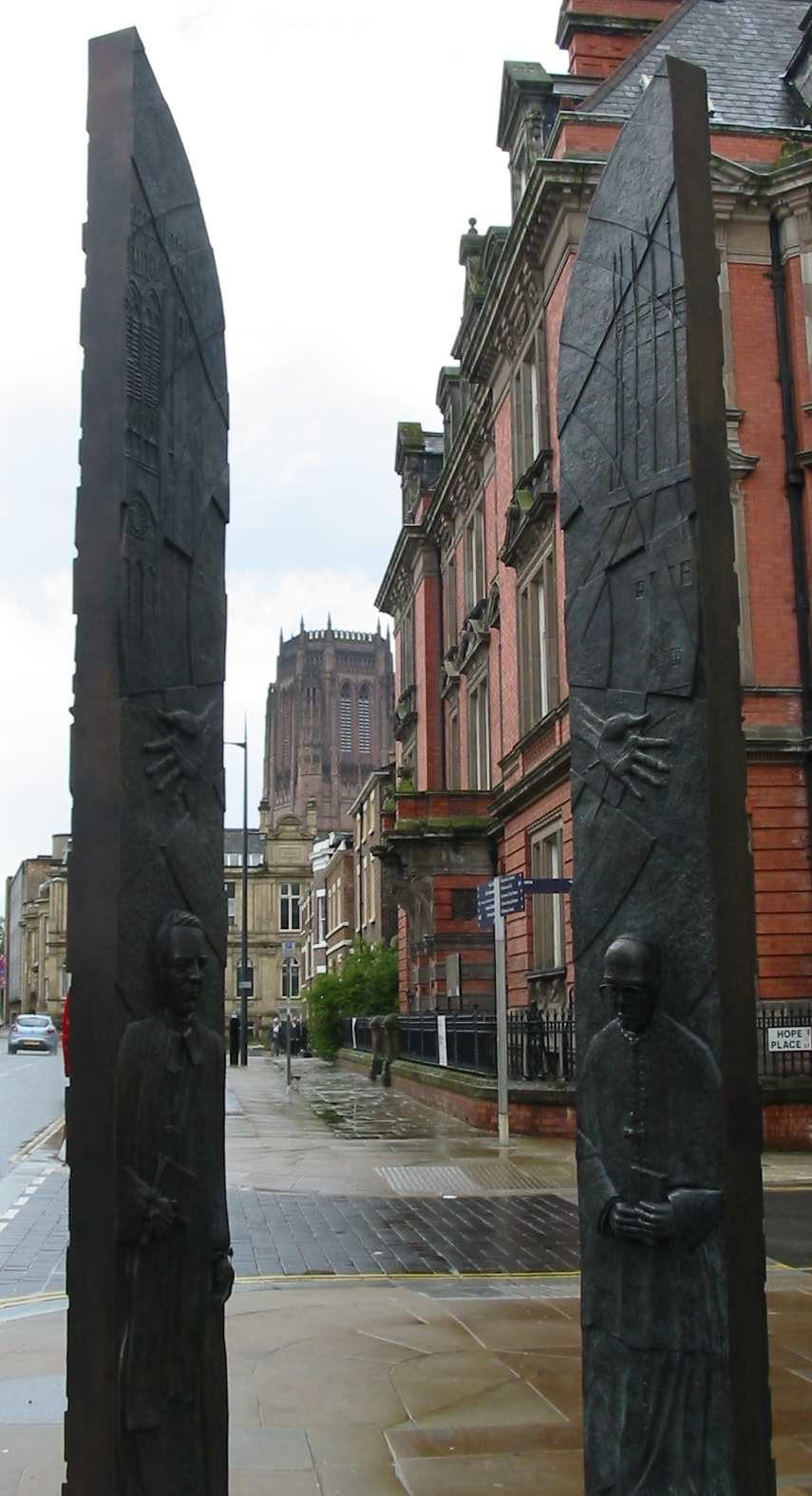
The Sheppard Worlock Statue, Bronze, c.2008, in Liverpool, England

The Sheppard-Worlock Statue is a statue located in Liverpool, England, commemorating two of the city's former bishops; David Sheppard (the Anglican Bishop of Liverpool), and Derek Worlock (the Roman Catholic Archbishop of Liverpool). It was designed by Stephen Broadbent.

== Origins and design ==
The statue was commissioned in 2005 by the Liverpool Echo newspaper and paid for by the people of Liverpool, to mark the life and work of Bishop David Sheppard and Archbishop Derek Worlock.

The aim of the statue was to create a lasting memorial to the work of the two religious leaders whose presence towered over Liverpool during the dark days of the 1970s and 1980s. Despite coming from two different churches in a city which, over the years, has seen deep religious divisions, Bishop David and Archbishop Derek together, and working with other religious leaders, were a uniting force.

Sculptor Stephen Broadbent won the commission with his design of two 15 ft bronze “doors” decorated with symbols and newspaper headlines from the two men's lives and ministry. Through the open doors the viewer can see both cathedrals signifying the unity the churchmen, affectionately dubbed “fish and chips” as they were always together and never out of the papers, strove to achieve.

Liverpool council has now accepted the statue as a gift to the city and people of Liverpool.

== Unveiling ==
The church leaders of all the mainstream Christian denominations, led a procession of up to 3,000 Christians through Liverpool on Sunday 11 May 2008 on a Walk of Witness. They took it in turns to read a specially-created memorial liturgy as they walked from the Metropolitan Cathedral to Liverpool Cathedral. Half-way between the two cathedrals on Hope Street, they stopped to unveil a 15 ft bronze statue designed by sculptor Stephen Broadbent honouring the work of Bishop David Sheppard and Archbishop Derek Worlock.

The memorial liturgy read as follows:

Living God

We give thanks for all those people whose lives have inspired us to see hope in the midst of struggle and pain; to reach out the hand of friendship to those who history has taught us to treat as strangers; to aspire to reach the new horizons that we would otherwise have struggled to see; to challenge the injustice that shackles those who are no less deserving than we are; to have faith in you that lights a way through the darkness of the immediate.

Today we particularly give thanks for Bishop David and Archbishop Derek, and all those who laboured alongside them for the well-being of this city and its people. For their willingness to become one with us; to listen to the voices of Merseyside’s people; to highlight the good as they sought to bring out the best in everyone.

For their example of friendship that crossed barriers that should never have existed; their example of courage that was willing to challenge those who had become blind to their own responsibility; their example of tenacity that did not give up in the face of adversity; their example of hope that will long resound through the streets of our city.

As we unveil this memorial, so the baton is passed to each one of us to continue the good work that they have helped us begin. As we mark their moment in history in this tangible way, may it become a milestone in our journey; that every generation which follows may be inspired to open doorways of hope for themselves and their fellows.

Today we pause on our journey to dedicate this space and this moment, that it may become a place where others will linger, not simply to remember the past, but to recognise the present in its true perspective, and to grasp the possibilities that the future offers. Realising that few of life’s aspirations can be fulfilled without the support of others.

May its doorway beckon every traveller to continue their life’s journey renewed in hope, and strengthened in resolve to follow an example whose ultimate expression is in you. Amen

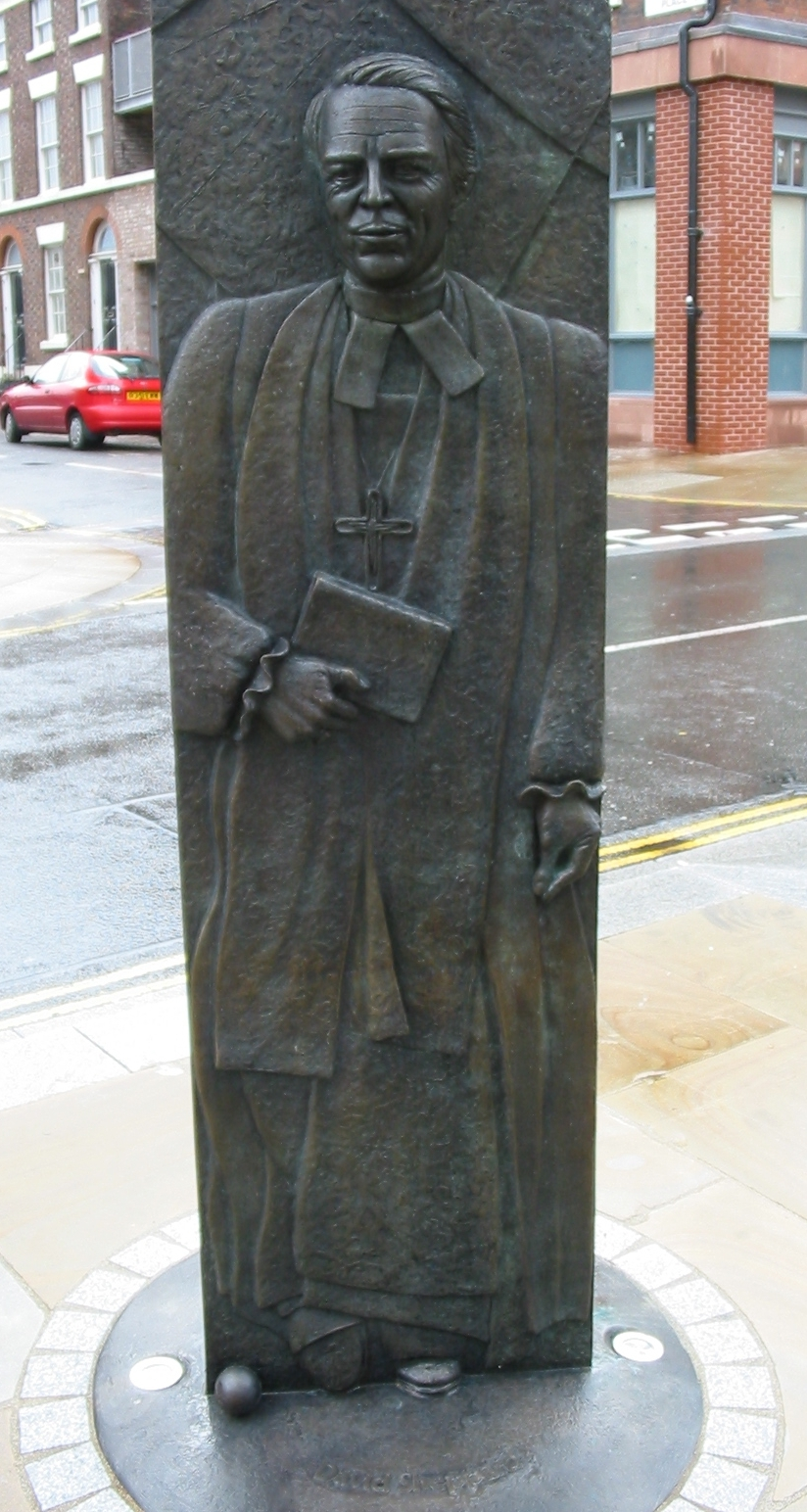

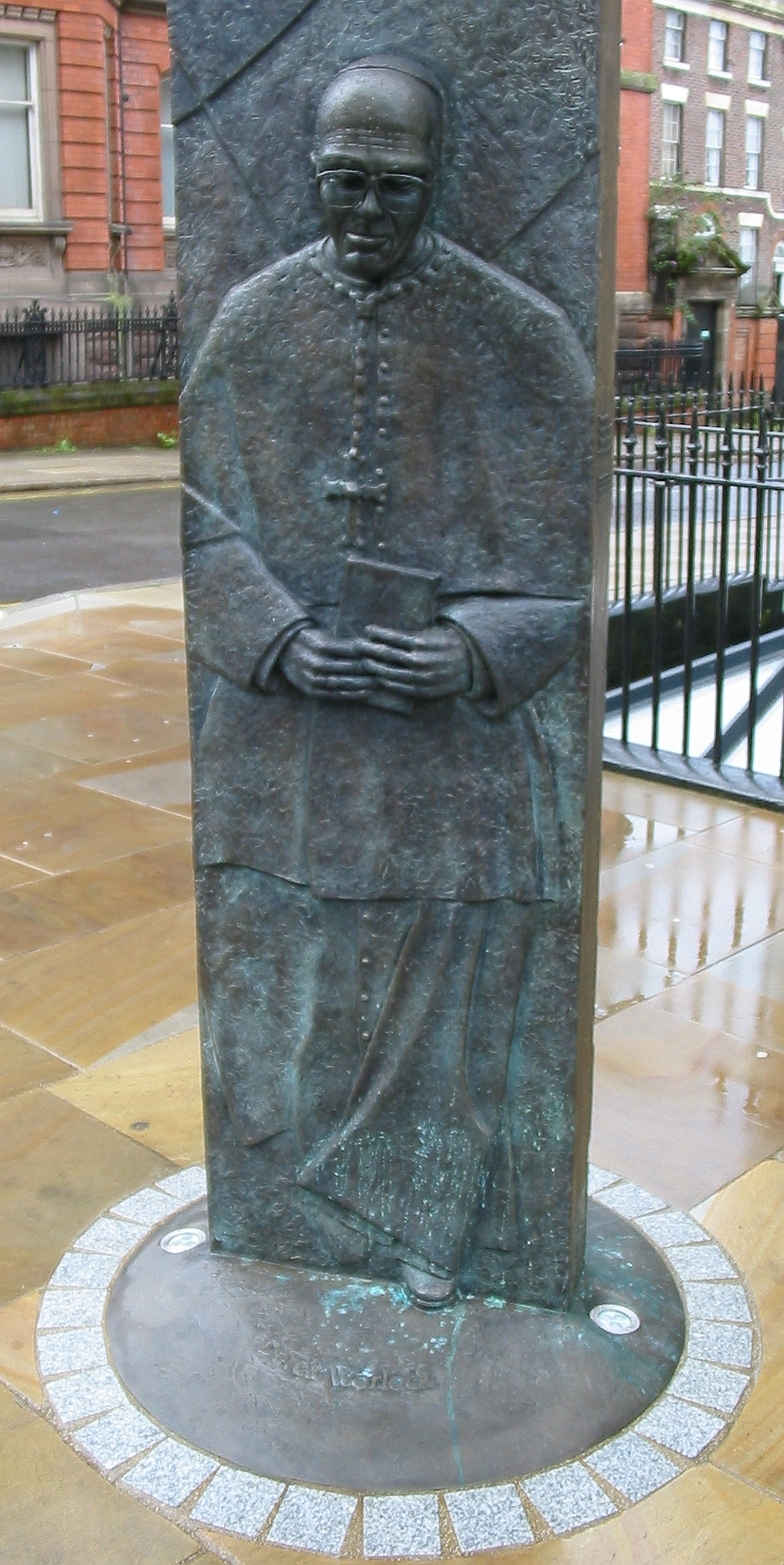
