= The Oratory, Liverpool =

The Oratory
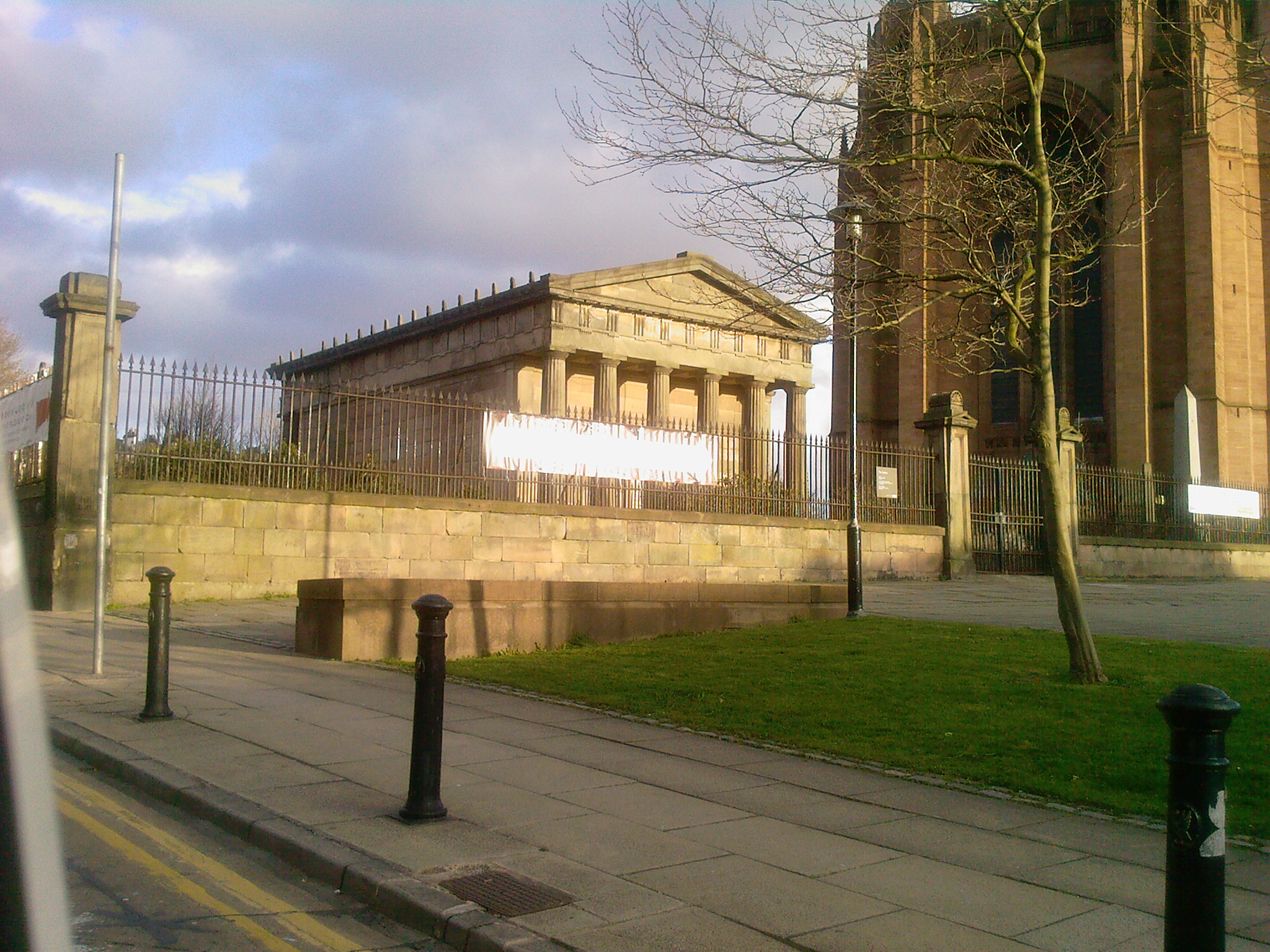
- The Oratory

- Location in Liverpool
- 53.3988°N 2.9732°W
- Location: Liverpool, England
- OS grid reference: SJ 354 895

History
- Built: 1829

Site notes
- Architect: John Foster
- Architectural style: Greek Revival
- Governing body: National Museums Liverpool

Listed Building – Grade I
- Designated: 28 June 1952
- Reference no.: 1063282

The Oratory stands to the north of Liverpool Anglican Cathedral in Merseyside, England. It was originally the mortuary chapel to St James Cemetery, and houses a collection of 19th-century sculpture and important funeral monuments as part of the Walker Art Gallery. It is a Grade I listed building in the National Heritage List for England.

== History ==
The Oratory was built in 1829, and used for funeral services before burials in the adjacent cemetery. It was designed by John Foster. When the cemetery closed, the building fell into disuse. In 1986 it came under the care of National Museums Liverpool, and is used to contain a collection of sculptures and statues.

== Architecture ==
The building is in the form of a Greek Doric temple. At each end is a portico with six columns. There are no windows and the building is lit from above. Inside, a coffered ceiling is supported by Ionic columns. Pollard and Pevsner consider this to be Foster's best surviving building. On 28 June 1952 it was designated as a Grade I listed building. In the National Heritage List for England it is described as "one of the purest monuments of the Greek Revival in England". Around the Oratory are cast iron railings and gate piers that have been listed at Grade II.

== Collection ==
Inside the building is a collection of monuments, mainly Neoclassical reliefs, many of which were brought here from demolished buildings in the 1980s. These include a monument dated 1834 given to the Nicholson family by Francis Chantrey, one to William Earle, who died in 1839, by John Gibson, to Dr William Stevenson, who died in 1853, by J. A. P. Macbride, to William Hammerton, who died in 1832, by Gibson, to William Ewart, who died in 1823, by Joseph Gott, to Emily Robinson, who died in 1829, by Gibson, and to Agnes Jones, who died in 1868, by Pietro Tenerani.

== See also ==
- Grade I listed buildings in Liverpool
- Grade I listed churches in Merseyside
- List of public art in Liverpool
- Architecture of Liverpool
