= Victoria Monument, Liverpool =

Monument at Derby Square in Liverpool, England

Coordinates: 53°24′18″N 2°59′25″W

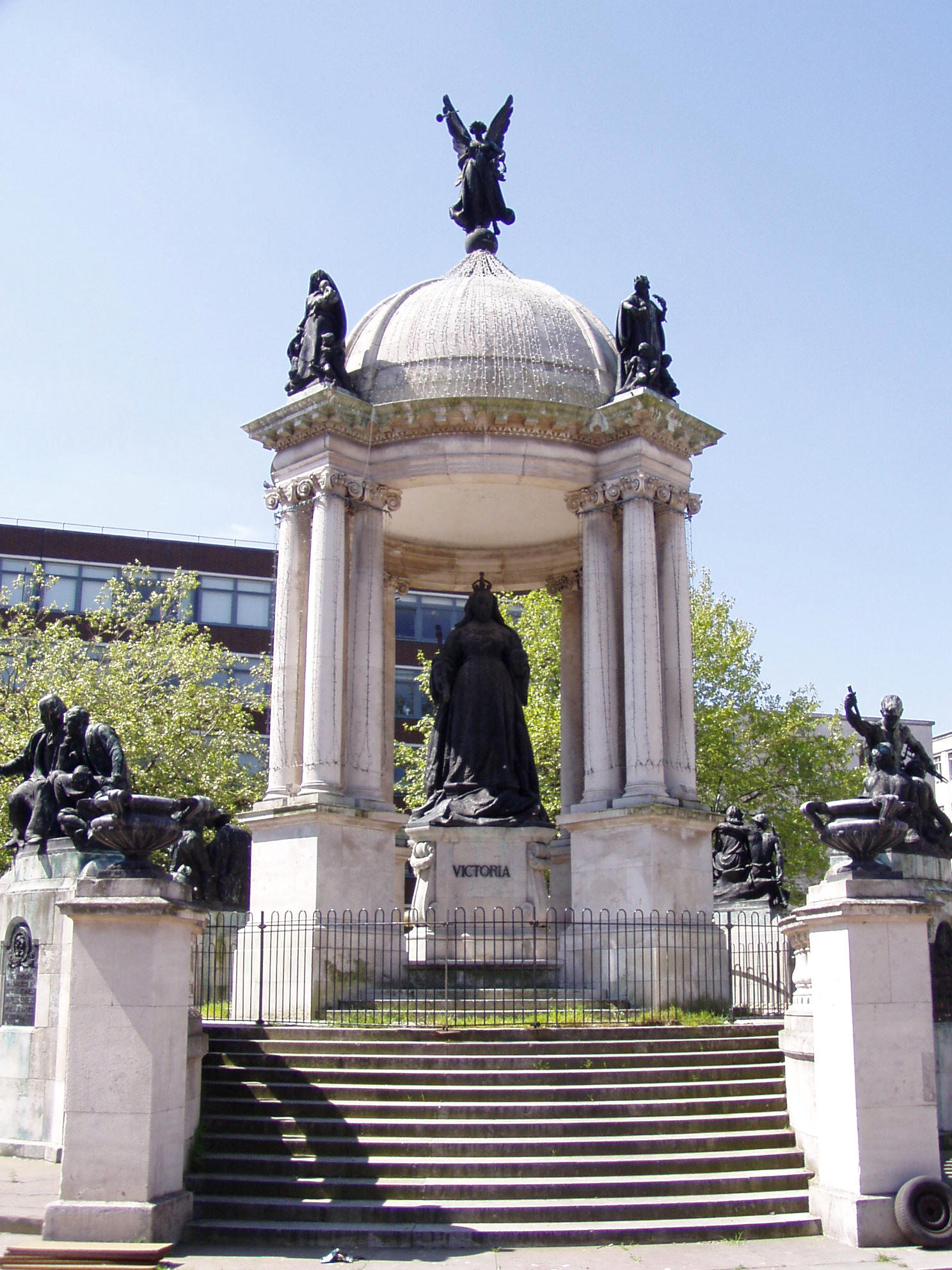
Victoria Monument, Liverpool

The Queen Victoria Monument is a large neo-Baroque or Beaux-Arts monument built over the former site of Liverpool Castle at Derby Square in Liverpool.

A large ensemble featuring 26 bronze figures by C. J. Allen (some in New Sculpture style), it was designed by F. M. Simpson of the Liverpool School of Architecture, in collaboration with the local architectural firm of Willink and Thicknesse and built of Portland stone. The foundation stone was laid on 11 October 1902 by Field Marshal Lord Roberts, Commander-in-Chief of the Forces. The monument was unveiled on 27 September 1906. It is a Grade II Listed structure, a preservation category for structures of special public interest.

Sharples and Pollard, in the Liverpool volume of the Pevsner Architectural Guides, describe the work as Allen's greatest, and as one of the most ambitious monuments to Queen Victoria.

There are four groups of figures around the pedestal, representing agriculture, commerce, industry and education. Among the figures representing education is a statue modelled on Sir Oliver Lodge. A large (4.42 metres (14.5 ft)) statue of Queen Victoria is at the centre, centred in four groups of columns which support a baldacchino-like open dome (which Terry Cavanagh called the monument's "least successful feature"). On top of the column groups are four allegorical figures representing justice, wisdom, charity, and peace. Atop the dome itself is a large figure representing fame.

In 2002, as part of the Liverpool Biennial festival, Japanese artist Tatsurou Bashi (b. 1960) created a hotel room around the statue of the Queen entitled Villa Victoria, in which paying guests could spend a night.

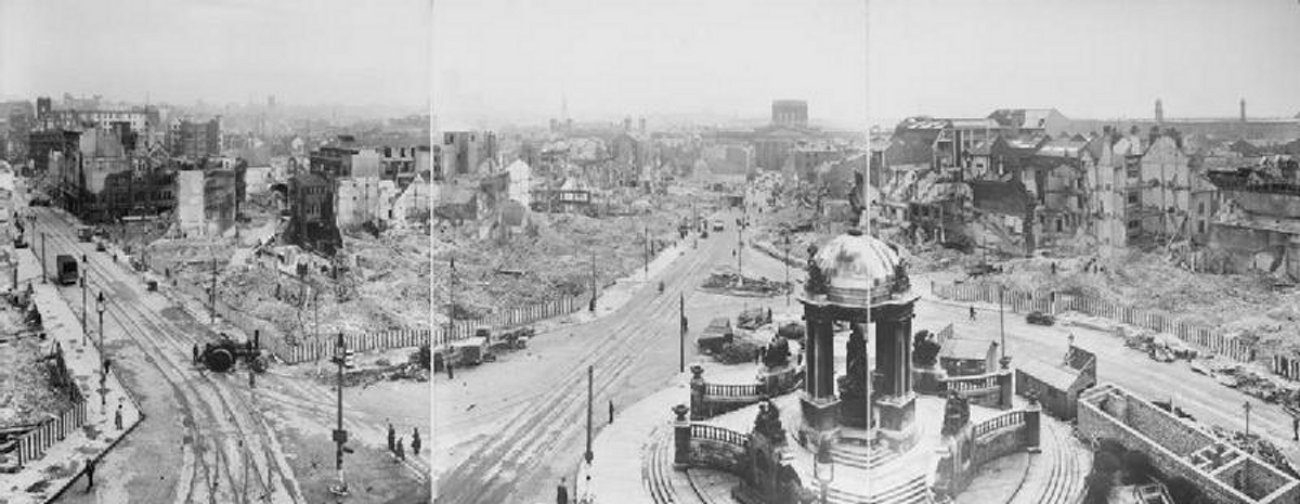
The monument standing amidst the desolation of the Liverpool Blitz

== See also ==
List of public art in Liverpool

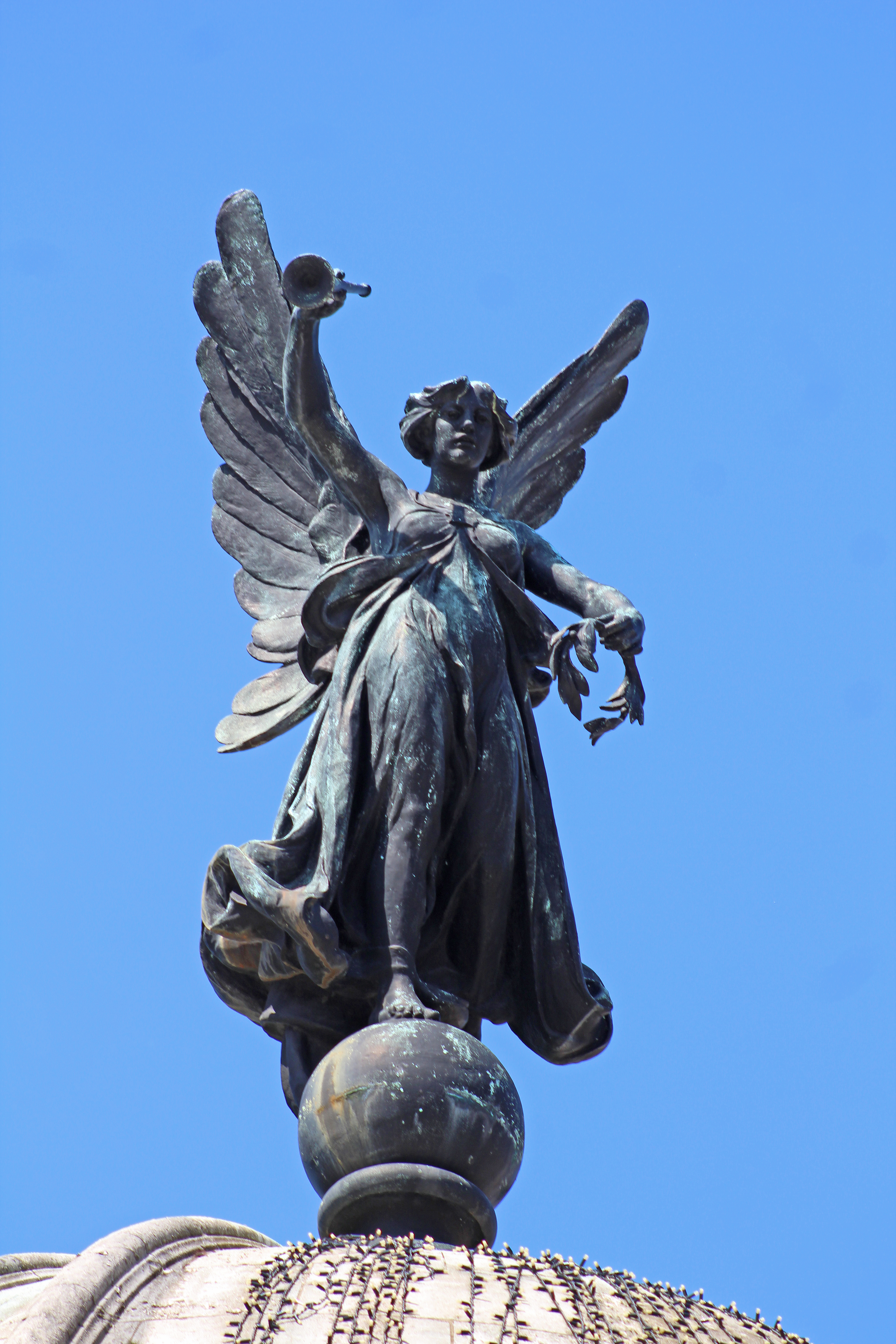
Fame atop the dome

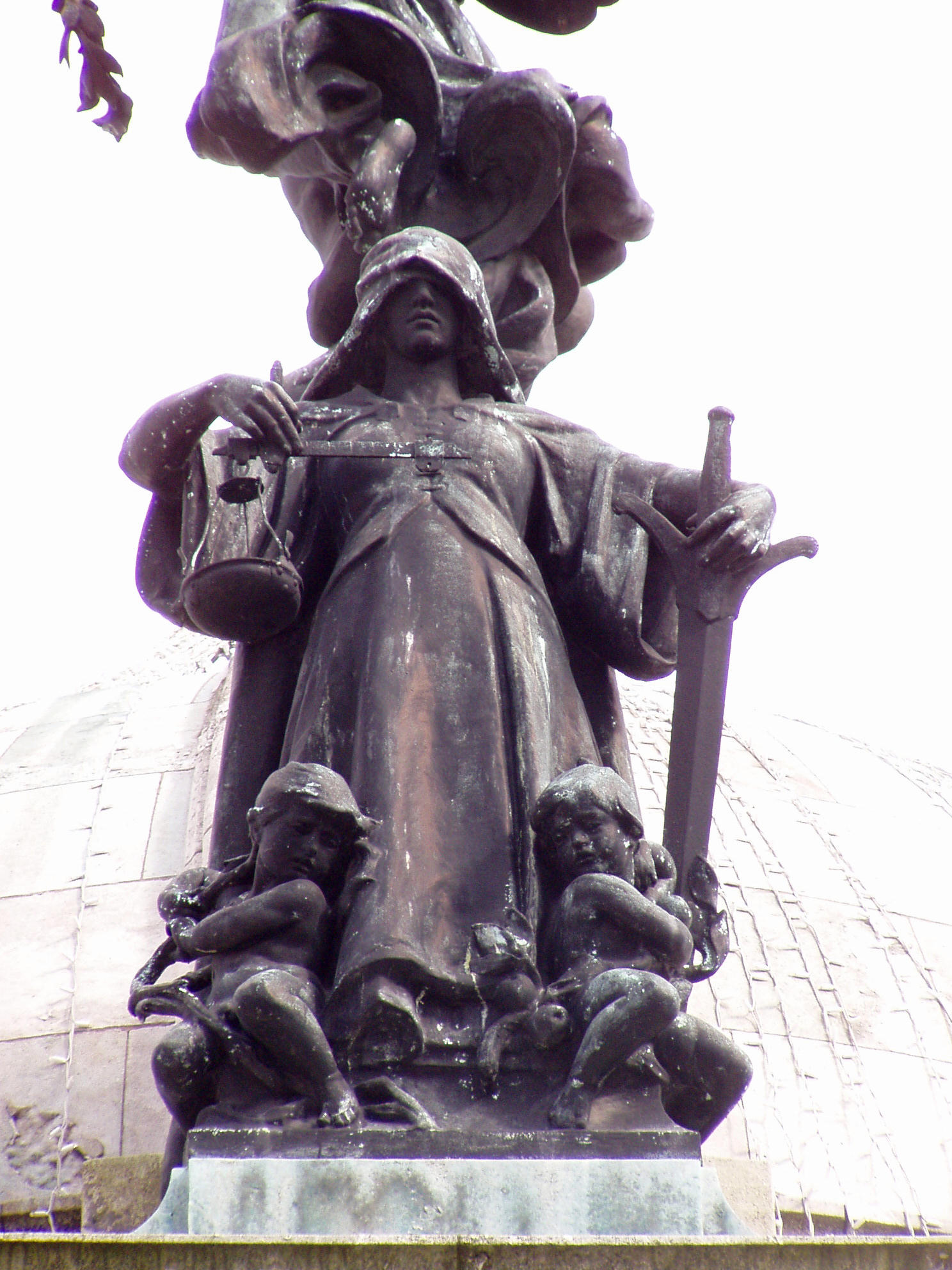

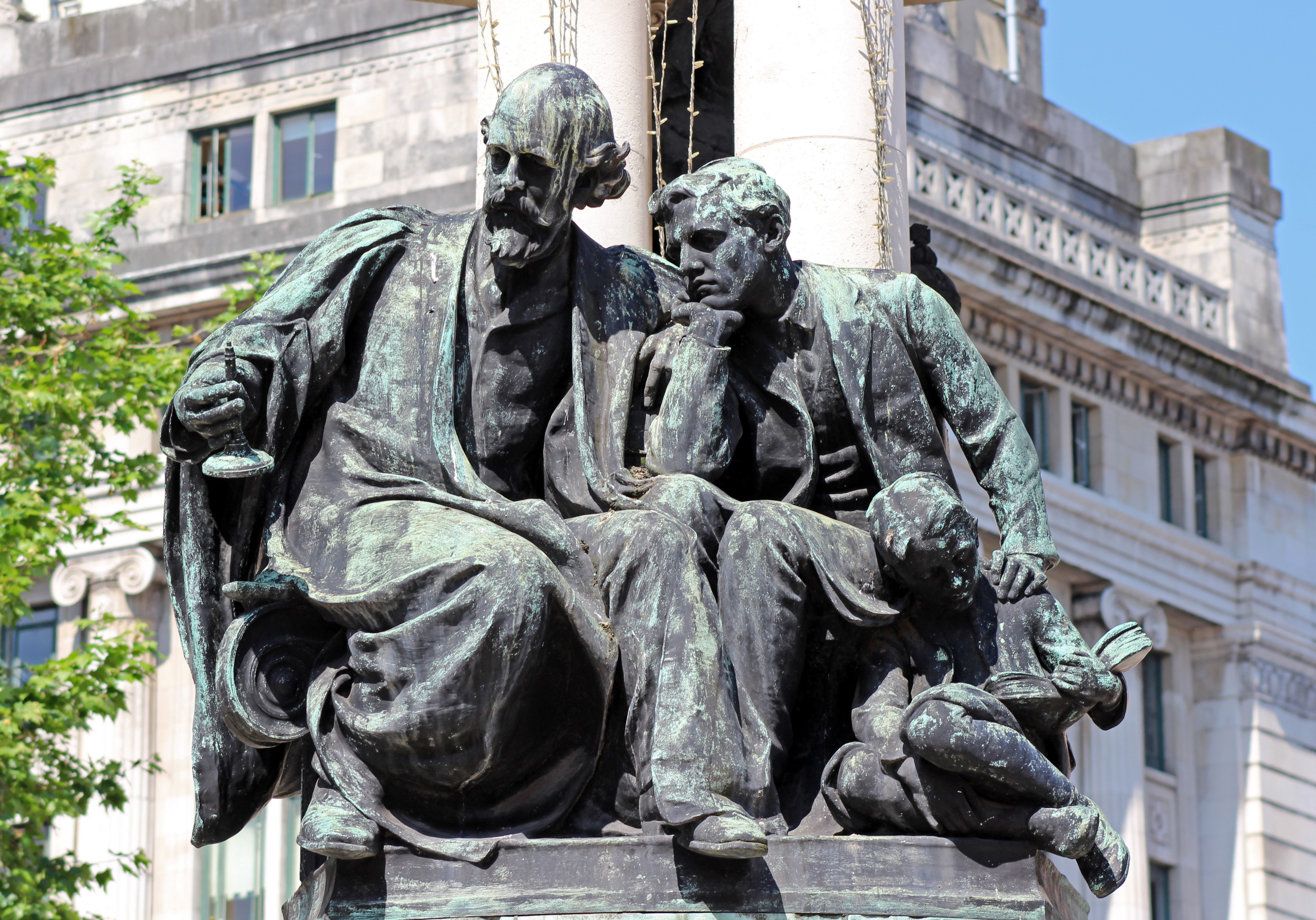
Education statue
