= Brigitte Jurack =

German sculptor

Brigitte Jurack (born Düsseldorf, 1962) is a contemporary artist based in Liverpool, working predominantly in sculpture and performance art.

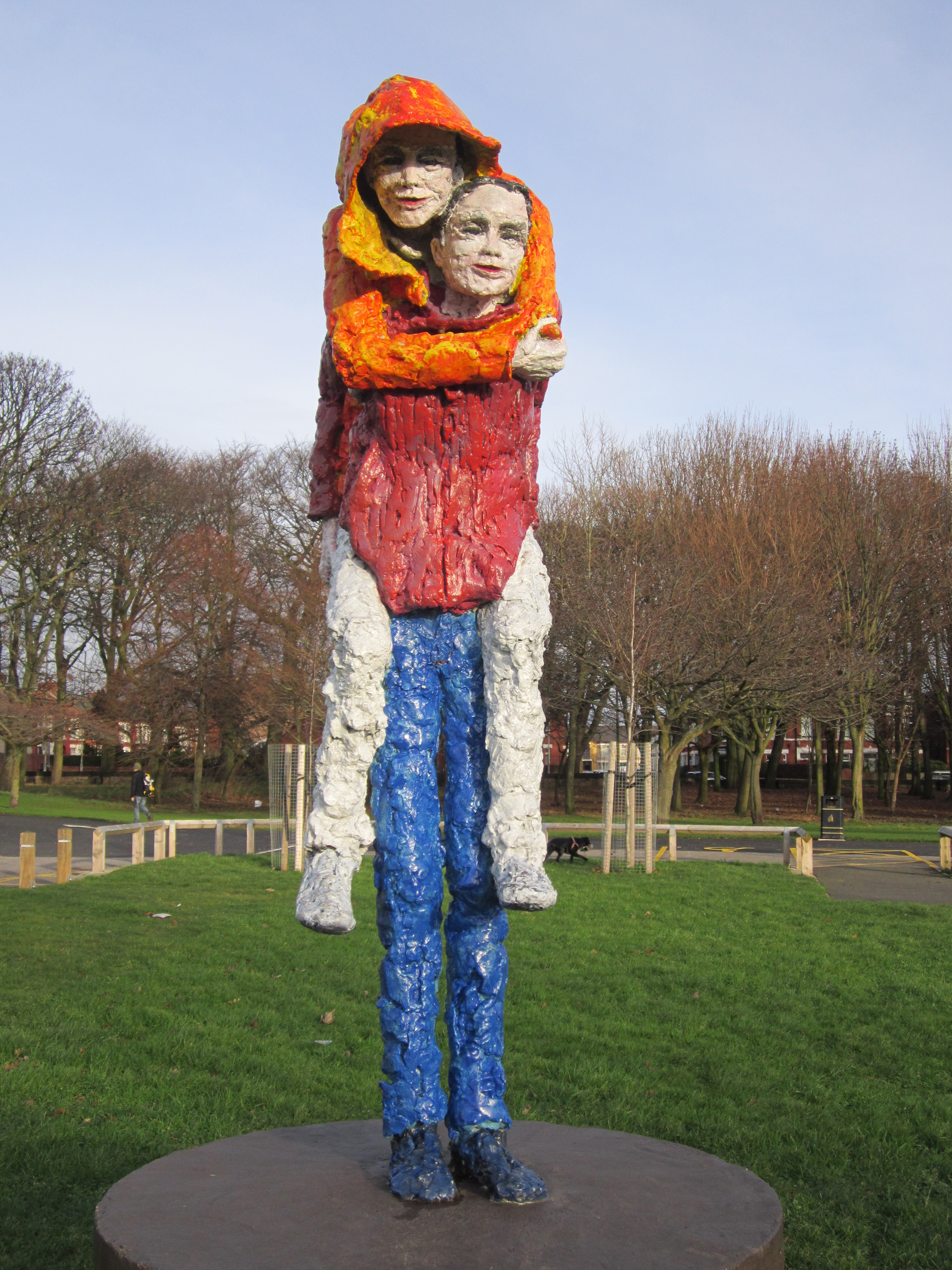
Sculpture in Central Park, Wallasey

== Life and career ==
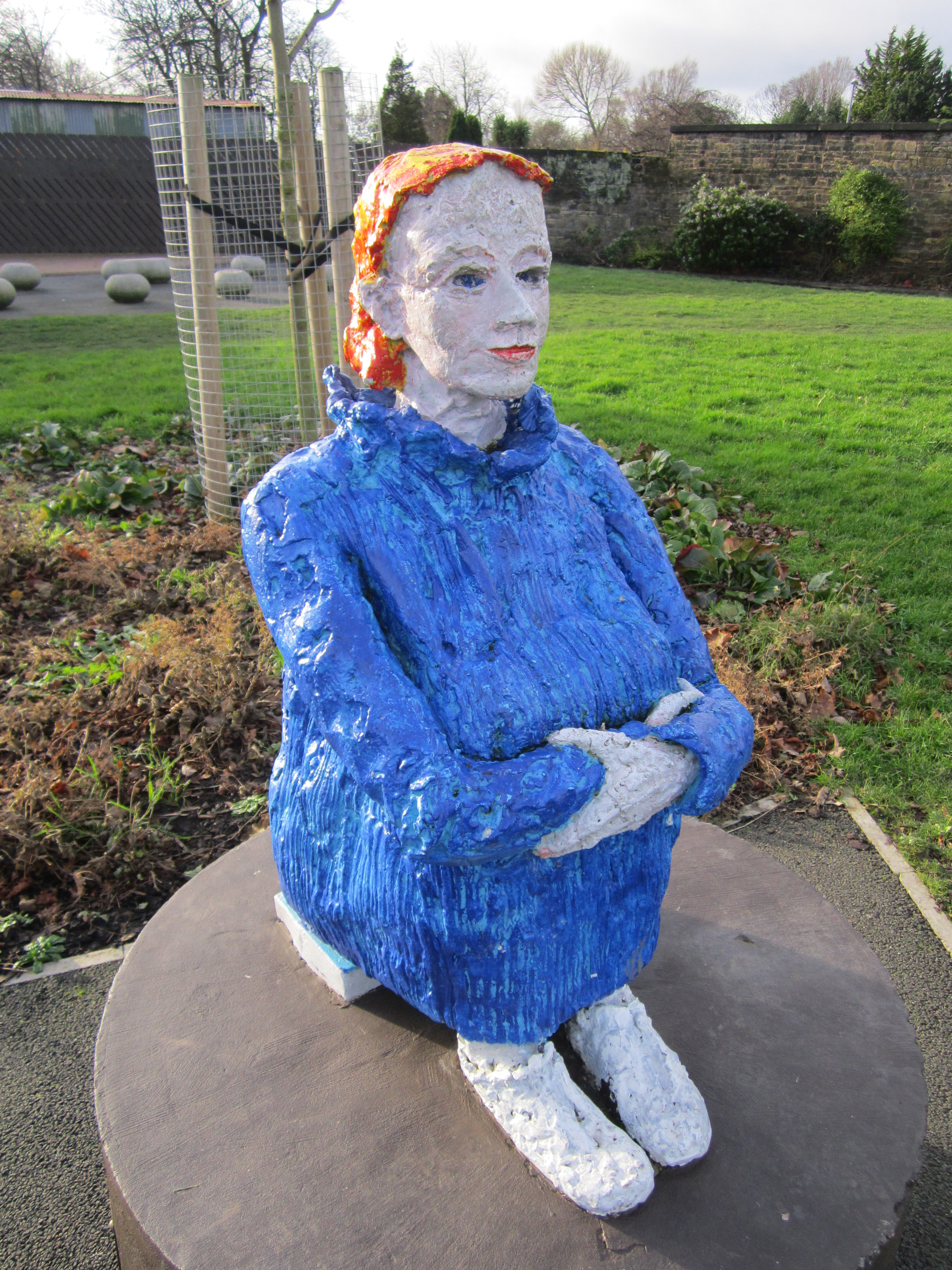
Sculpture in Central Park, Wallasey

Brigitte Jurack studied Protestant Theology at the Universities of Göttingen, Münster and Bonn, and Fine Art at Kunstakademie Düsseldorf in Germany. Jurack completed a Postgraduate Diploma in Environmental Art at Glasgow School of Art in 1990, supported by a British Council Scholarship. She went on to complete an MA Sculpture at Chelsea College of Art and Design, London in 1992. In 2018 she completed a PhD doctoral thesis entitled 'Why bother? Uncertainty, awkwardness and bravado in the sculptural representation of youth', undertaken at Manchester School of Art (Manchester Metropolitan University).

In 1998 Jurack co-founded the artist collective Foreign Investment with artist Alma Tischlerwood. The collective, who have exhibited widely internationally, seek to "create situations where artists, audiences and participant communities come together to question the value of things in unexpected ways". Projects by Foreign Investment include One Square Foot of Sky at the Collector Club, Hong Kong (2014) and Everything Must go at Chinese Arts Centre, Manchester (2011). Jurack's exhibition work with Foreign Investment includes numerous performance and soundworks.

In 2012 Jurack made a new piece of public sculpture, commissioned by Wirral council, for Central Park in Wallasey. The sculptures to commemorate the former Wallasey School of Art were designed in collaboration with young people from local schools and youth groups and with support from Arts Council England.

Jurack has taught fine art at a number of universities in the UK, holding posts as senior lecturer at John Moores University in Liverpool, Derby University, University of Newcastle and currently at Manchester School of Art.

== Selected exhibitions ==
- Monkey Business, FILET, London, 2018
- Pink Parachute, Grundy Art Gallery, Blackpool, 2012
- Sculpture by the Sea, Aarhus, Denmark, 2015
- Just Wait for Me, Central Park, Wallasey, 2013
- Die Se (e) (h) kuh, Kiosk 24, Germany, 2011
- Irfaran, The Globe Gallery, Newcastle, 2008
- Moonshine Walk, Sutton Manor, 2008

== Awards and residencies ==
- Sanskriti Residency, SansKriti Foundation, Delhi, India, 2018
- Shortlisted for Liverpool Art Prize, 2014
- Prince of Wales Bursary, British School at Athens 2010/2011
- IMMA, Dublin – artist in residence, 2010
