= St James Cemetery =

Cemetery in Liverpool, United Kingdom

Coordinates: 53.39711°N 2.97194°W

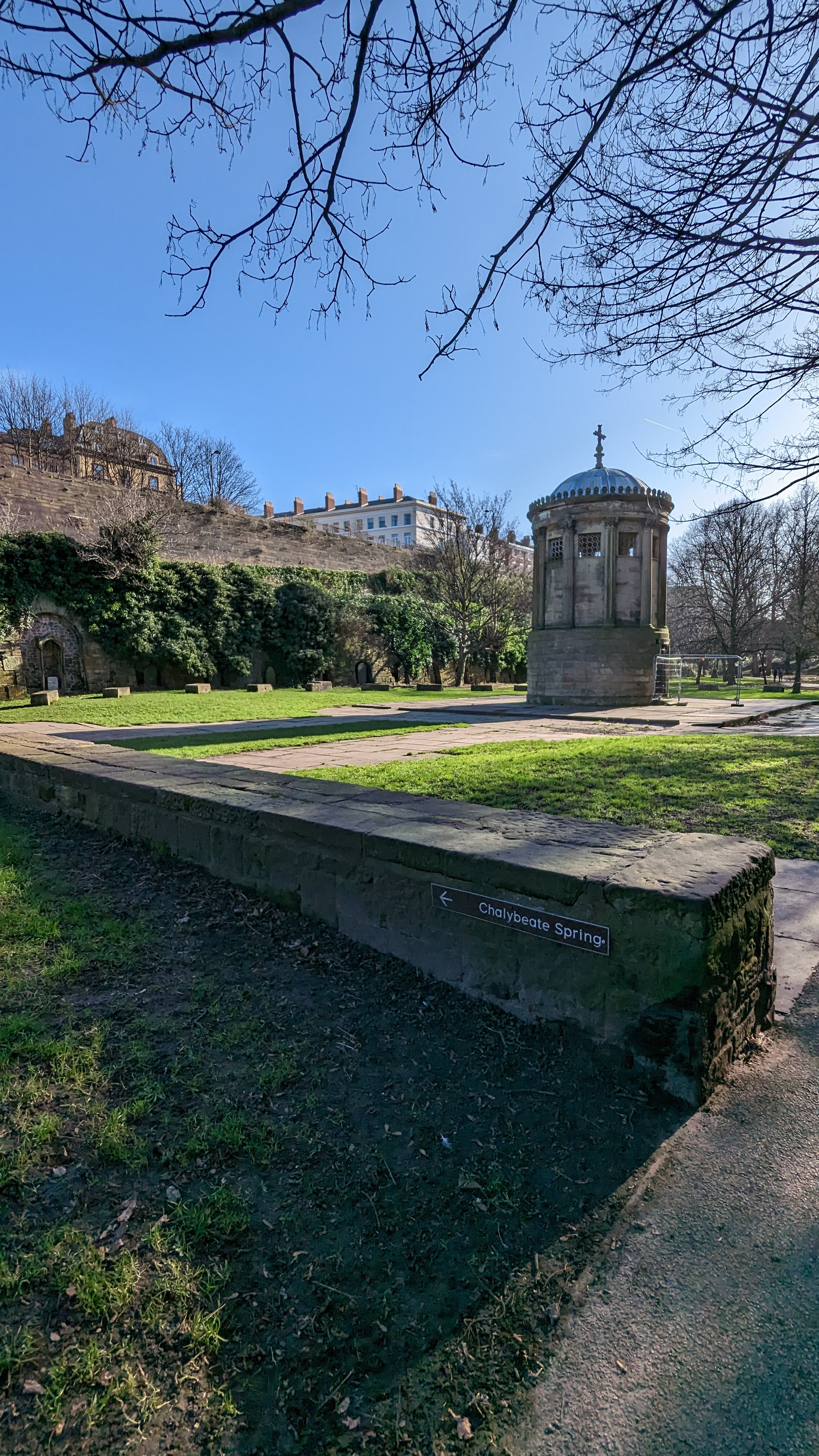
- View of the Huskisson Memorial
- Interactive map of St James Cemetery

Details
- Established: 1829
- Location: Liverpool, England
- Type: Public
- Owned by: Liverpool City Council
- Size: 9 acres (3.6 ha)
- No. of graves: 57,774
- Website: www.stjamescemetery.co.uk
- Find a Grave: St James Cemetery

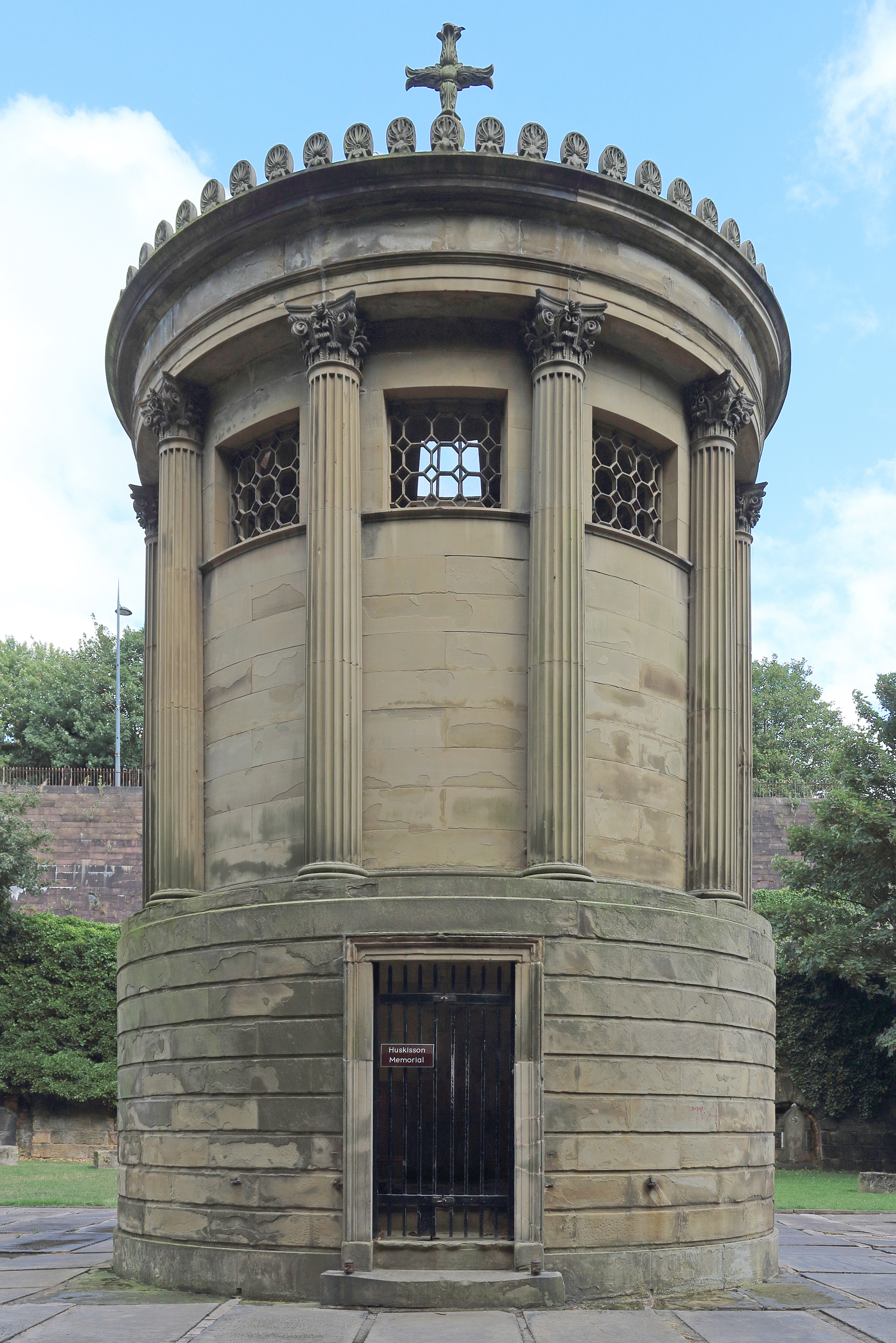
Huskisson Memorial

St James's Cemetery is an urban park behind Liverpool Cathedral that is below ground level. Until 1825, the space was a stone quarry, and until 1936 it was used as the Liverpool city cemetery. It has been designated a Grade I Historic Park by Historic England.

== History ==
The workings and operation of the cemetery predate the Cathedral to which it does not belong. The Cathedral, which began construction in 1903, occupies most of rock outcrop above the cemetery known as St James Mount (also known as Quarry Hill or Mount Zion) that in 1771 was established as Liverpool's first public park.

The cemetery has two entrances which are always open. At the north side a stone path lined with recycled grave stones descends through a short tunnel between The Oratory and the main entrance of the cathedral. The southern entrance near Upper Parliament street is through a stone arch between the Garden Lodge and the steps up to the Mount. Notable features include the Huskisson memorial, a natural spring and a system of broad ramps lined with catacombs. There is no access from Hope Street.

== Quarry ==
The original stone quarry began operation in the 16th century. The tunnel workings (most of which are blocked) probably happened in the 18th century. In 1773 the quarry workers discovered a chalybeate spring, which still flows today.

There were windmills in operation at the edge of the quarry until the 1820s.

The quarry was exhausted in 1825.

== Cemetery ==
In 1826 the young architect John Foster Jr was commissioned to design and lay out a cemetery along the same lines as Père Lachaise Cemetery, Paris with £20,000 raised by public subscription.

=== Oratory ===
On the high ground at the north, Foster built the windowless "Oratory" in the style of Greek Revival architecture to accommodate funeral services before burials took place in the cemetery.

The building today, which is infrequently open to the public, contains a number of the monumental statues recovered from the cemetery. A bronze sculpture by Tracey Emin stands in front of the building and is visible through the gates.

There was also a house for the minister, of which there is no trace, on the site of the cathedral.

=== Garden Lodge ===
To the south, Foster built a monumental arch and porter's lodge out of the same stone. After years of being used as a property of the council for its workmen, it was refurbished into a private home in 1997.

=== Burial grounds ===
The cemetery was closed in 1936 after 57,774 burials and subsequently fell into a state of disrepair.

The monument above where William Huskisson is buried stands near the spring.

Mouth and foot painting artist Sarah Biffin (1784-1850) was buried here but her gravestone has been lost.

A Victoria Cross holder, Sergeant Arthur Herbert Lindsay Richardson (1872–1932), was buried here. He also has a memorial in the grounds of the Liverpool Cathedral.

== Park ==
The project to turn the cemetery into a park was completed by 1972 after clearing the vast majority of gravestones.

== See also ==
- Architecture of Liverpool
