= John Warrington Wood =

British sculptor (1839–1886)

John Warrington Wood (9 September 1839 – 26 December 1886) was a British sculptor of mythological subjects and portrait busts. He exhibited works at the Royal Academy from 1868 to 1874.

== Biography ==
Born in Warrington, Lancashire, Wood trained as a stonemason. He was the son of James Wood who was a road surveyor for Warrington but had started his career as a stonemason. His birth name was John Wood, and he added Warrington in circa 1865 to avoid confusion with a fellow artist of the same name.

From 1858 Wood attended the new Warrington School of Art (Warrington Collegiate Institute) in the evenings and he quickly achieved local recognition and patronage. In 1865 Wood moved to Rome and established a highly successful practice, mainly focusing on portrait busts and sacred themes. In 1877 he was elected to the Guild of St Luke in Rome. His 1881 marble bust of Lady Mary Enid Layard is in the collection of the British Museum in London.

Wood died suddenly of complications of a heart condition at the Lion Hotel in Bridge Street, Warrington.
