= Stephen Broadbent =

British sculptor

Stephen Broadbent is a British sculptor, specialising in public art. He was born in Wroughton, Wiltshire in 1961 and educated at Liverpool Blue Coat School. In Liverpool he studied sculpture for four years under Arthur Dooley.

He has created public sculptures for communities across the UK and for international projects. His sculptural practice aims to create artworks which resonate with the environments in which they are placed, often achieved through community collaboration.

== Significant works ==
Broadbent contributed to the remodelling of Bridge Street in Warrington town centre, the site of the 1993 Warrington bomb attacks that killed two children. His 'River Of Life' memorial is intended to give hope for the future, and takes the form of a fountain and a river running down the street, bringing healing and refreshment.

He has created two versions of the Reconciliation Triangle. The first, in 1989, represented connections between Liverpool, Glasgow and Dublin. The second marked the legacy of the slave trade in the histories of Liverpool, Richmond, Virginia and Benin. The sculptures in each connected city are identical (apart from the addition of low-relief bronze designs), marking the historical connections between locations whilst creating a new one in a process of healing.

His sculptures on Littlehaven Promenade, South Shields and Keel Square, Sunderland, both contributed to winning entries into the 2015 Northern Design Awards.

His largest work, 'Encounter', stands at junction 11 of the M62 Motorway at Birchwood, and incorporates telecommunications aerials within the metalwork.

== List of works ==
- Reconciliation, Liverpool, Glasgow, Belfast
- Celebration of Chester, Chester
- Water of Life, Chester Cathedral
- The River of Life, Warrington
- Coming Together, Liverpool
- Gateway markers, Sutton
- Seasons, Water Feature, Manchester Cathedral Gardens
- Pulling the Plug, Hyde Town Hall
- The Word, Methodist Publishing House
- Empowerment, Lincoln
- Encounter, Birchwood
- Four Corners, King Mohammed IV Centre, Morocco
- Sculptural Seating, Fleming Square, Blackburn
- Faces of Liverpool, Beetham Tower Gardens, Liverpool
- Entrance Feature, Corbett Hospital
- Frank Whittle Memorial, Rugby
- Drift Park, Rhyl
- Sculpture Trail, West End Gardens, Morecambe
- Desks, Beetham Organisation, West Tower
- Reconciliation, Liverpool, Benin, Virginia
- Sheppard Worlock Memorial Sculpture], Liverpool
- Seed Sculpture, Liverpool Hope University
- John Newton Sculpture, Liverpool
- Seats, UCLAN Preston
- Tudor Square, Sheffield
- Growth, Saltney
- Casuals, Salford Quays
- Wayfinding Elements, Carlisle City Centre
- Planted, Stockbridge Village
- Newbridge town centre artworks
- Mythic Coast, Cleveleys
- Chaucer Totem, Sheffield
- Maesteg Bud, Maesteg
- "Eye" and "Sail" features, Littlehaven Promenade, South Shields
- Propellers of the City, Sunderland
- Lives Lived, Lives Lost, National Coal Mining Museum, Wakefield
- Coming Home, Gleneagles Golf Resort
- Garden of Pooled Talents, Sheffield University
- Linear Garden, Sci-Tech Daresbury
- The Voice of the City, Peterborough
- From Me To You, Blackpool Victoria Hospital
- The Eudaemonium, Altrincham
- Walking Together, Markham Vale
