= C. J. Allen (sculptor) =

British sculptor (1862–1956)

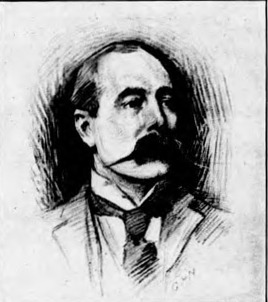
- Born: 2 September 1862; Greenford
- Died: January 1956 (aged 93–94)
- Occupation: Sculptor, medalist

Charles John Allen (2 September 1862 – 1956) was a British sculptor, and a figure in the New Sculpture movement.

== Biography ==
Born in Greenford, Middlesex, Allen studied at the Lambeth School of Art and then apprenticed with the London architectural sculpture firm Farmer & Brindley in 1879, becoming the assistant to Hamo Thornycroft for four years. In 1894 Allen moved to Liverpool, where he spent more than thirty years as a respected teacher at the University of Liverpool and Vice-Principal at the Liverpool School of Architecture and Applied Arts, which became the Liverpool School of Art in 1905.

Allen died in 1956 at Farley Green, Albury, Surrey, where he had lived with his sister since the death of his wife, shortly after his retirement from teaching.

== Notable work ==
- The 1906 monument to Queen Victoria, Liverpool, Allen's masterwork
- Two allegorical panels for St. George's Hall, Liverpool, 1894
- The John Heminges and Henry Condell Memorial, London; dated 1895, unveiled 1896.
- Marble reredos at St Paul's Cathedral, London
- Wood carvings at St Albans Cathedral
- Work at the Liverpool University College (now University of Liverpool) with architect Alfred Waterhouse, 1895
- Frieze for the Royal Insurance Building, Liverpool, c. 1897
- Panels and other work for the Peres Bank, Leicester, c. 1900
- War memorial for Eastham Village, 1924
- Architectural sculpture for the Mersey Docks and Harbour Board Building, 1927
- Choir stall canopies and the font in Ullet Road Unitarian Church, Liverpool

== Gallery ==
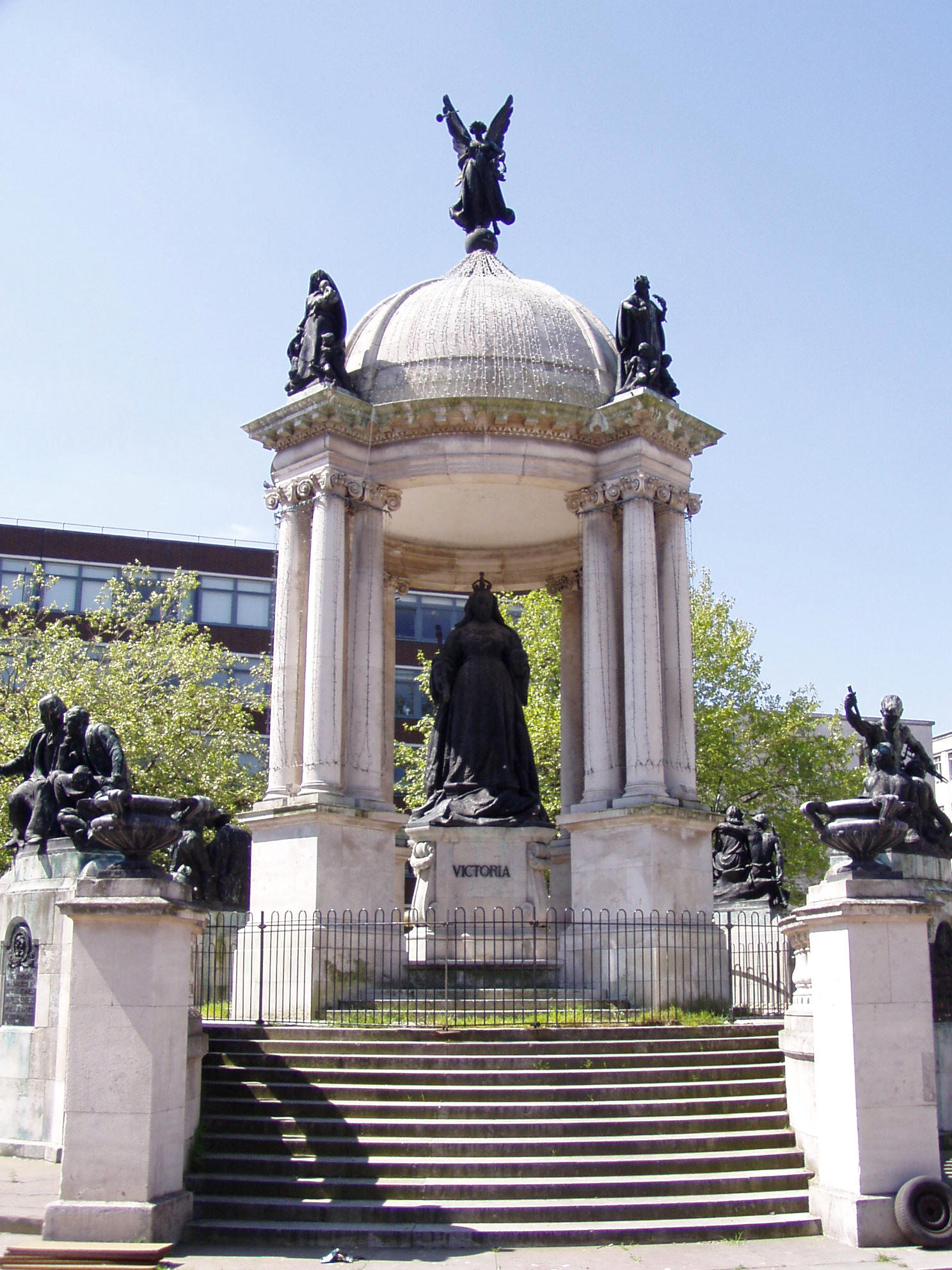
Victoria Monument, Liverpool

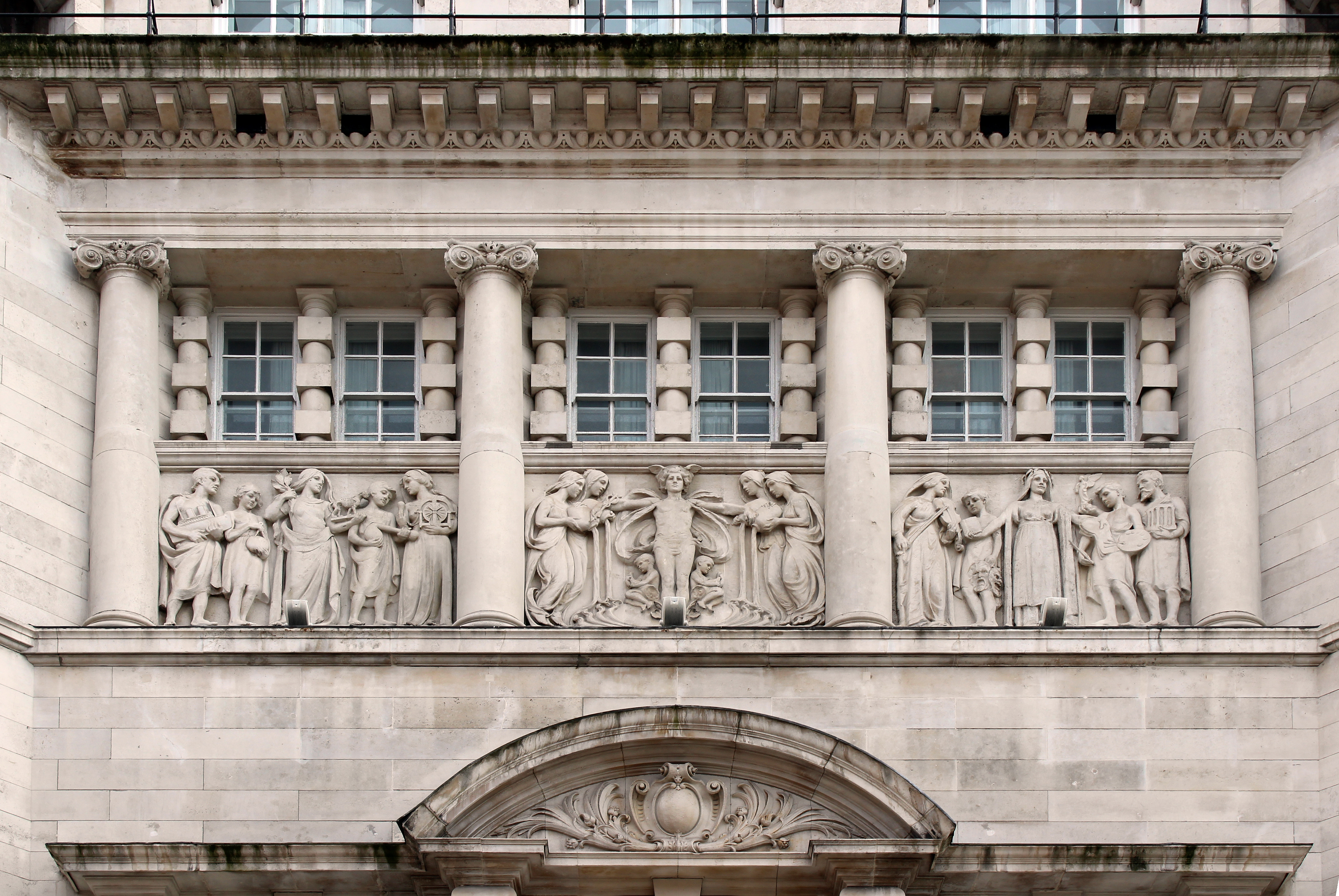
Frieze on the Dale Street side of Royal Insurance Building, Liverpool

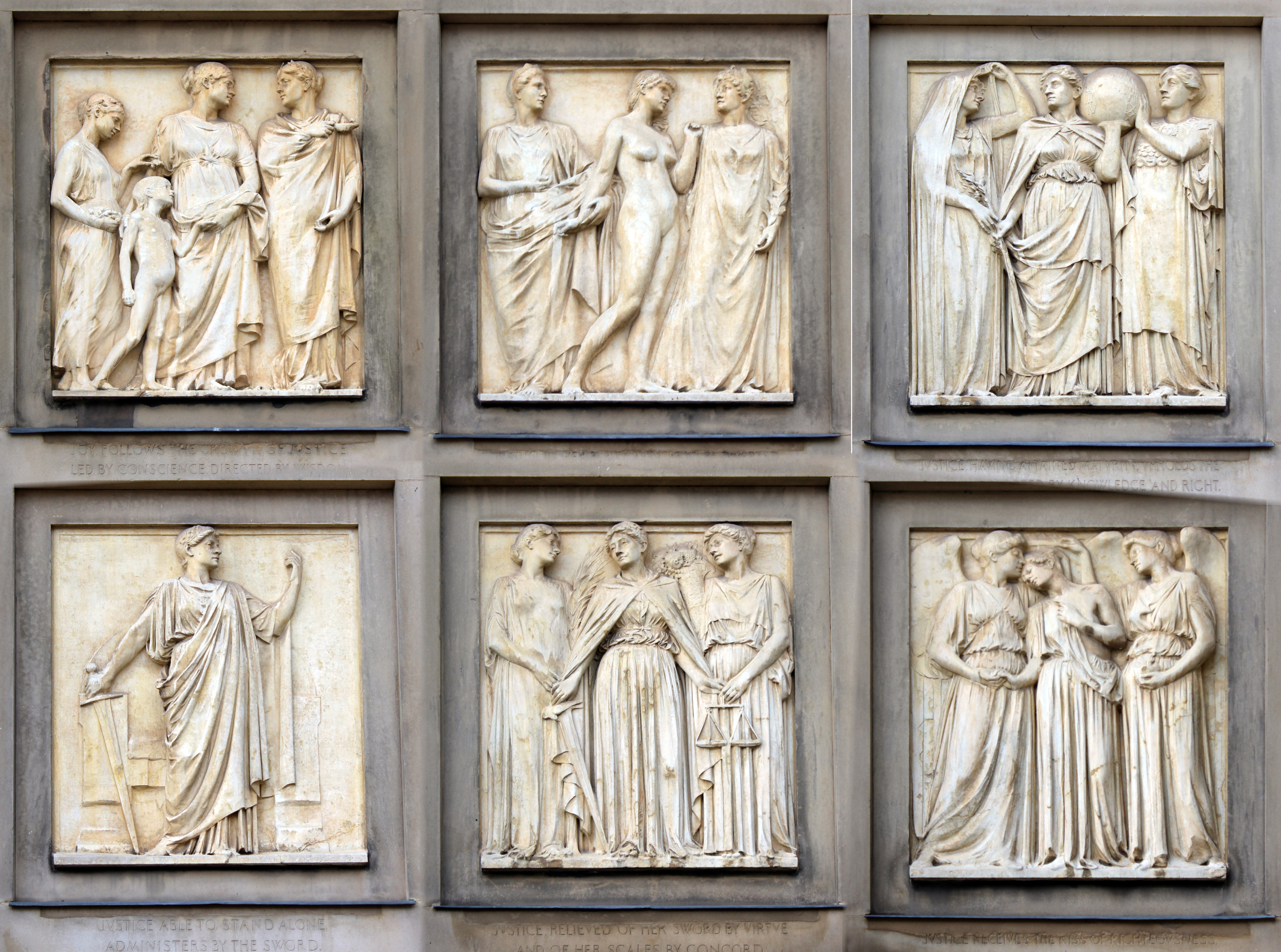
Panels of the "Justice" frieze, St George's Hall

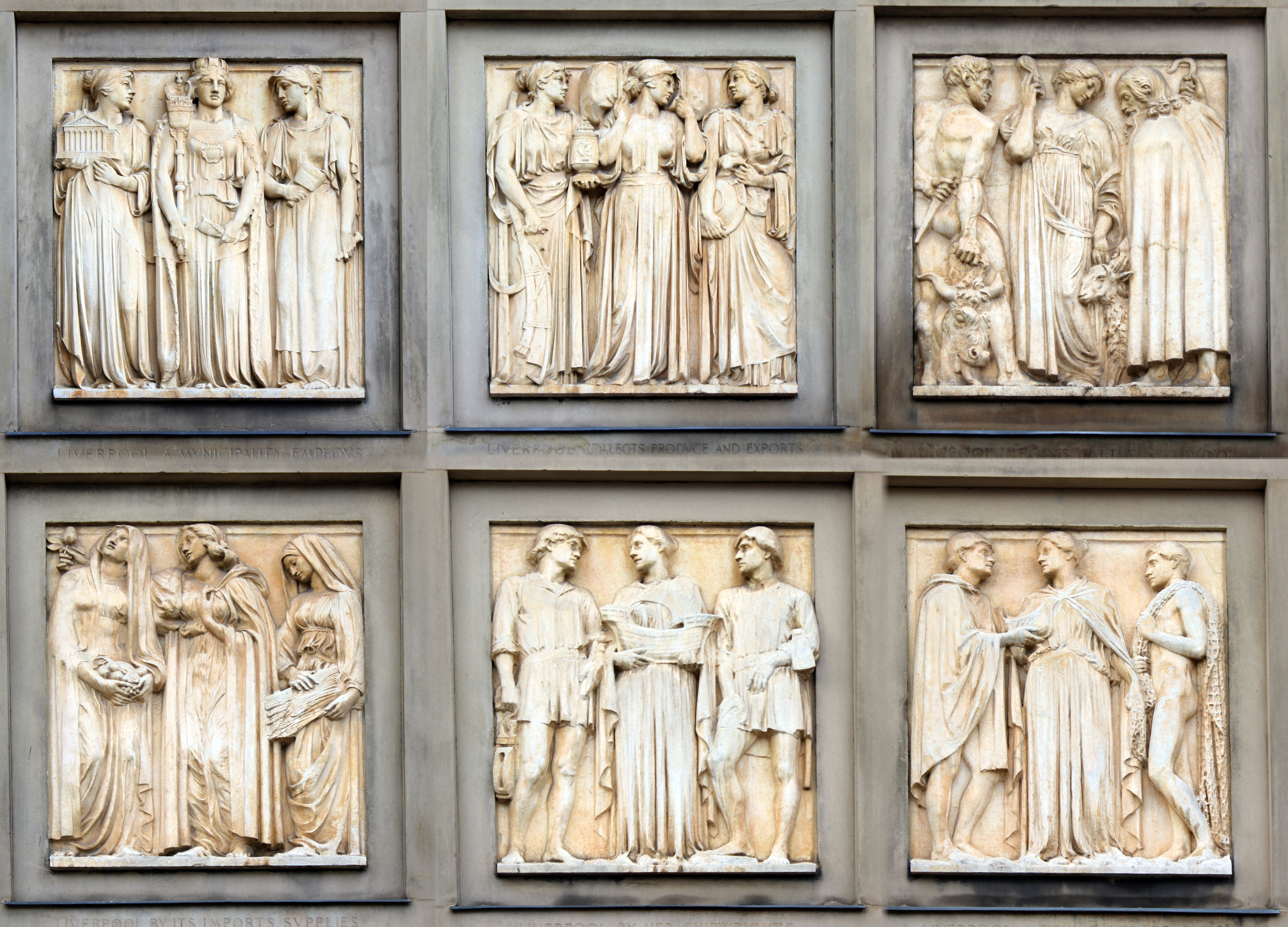
Panels of the "Liverpool" frieze, St George's Hall

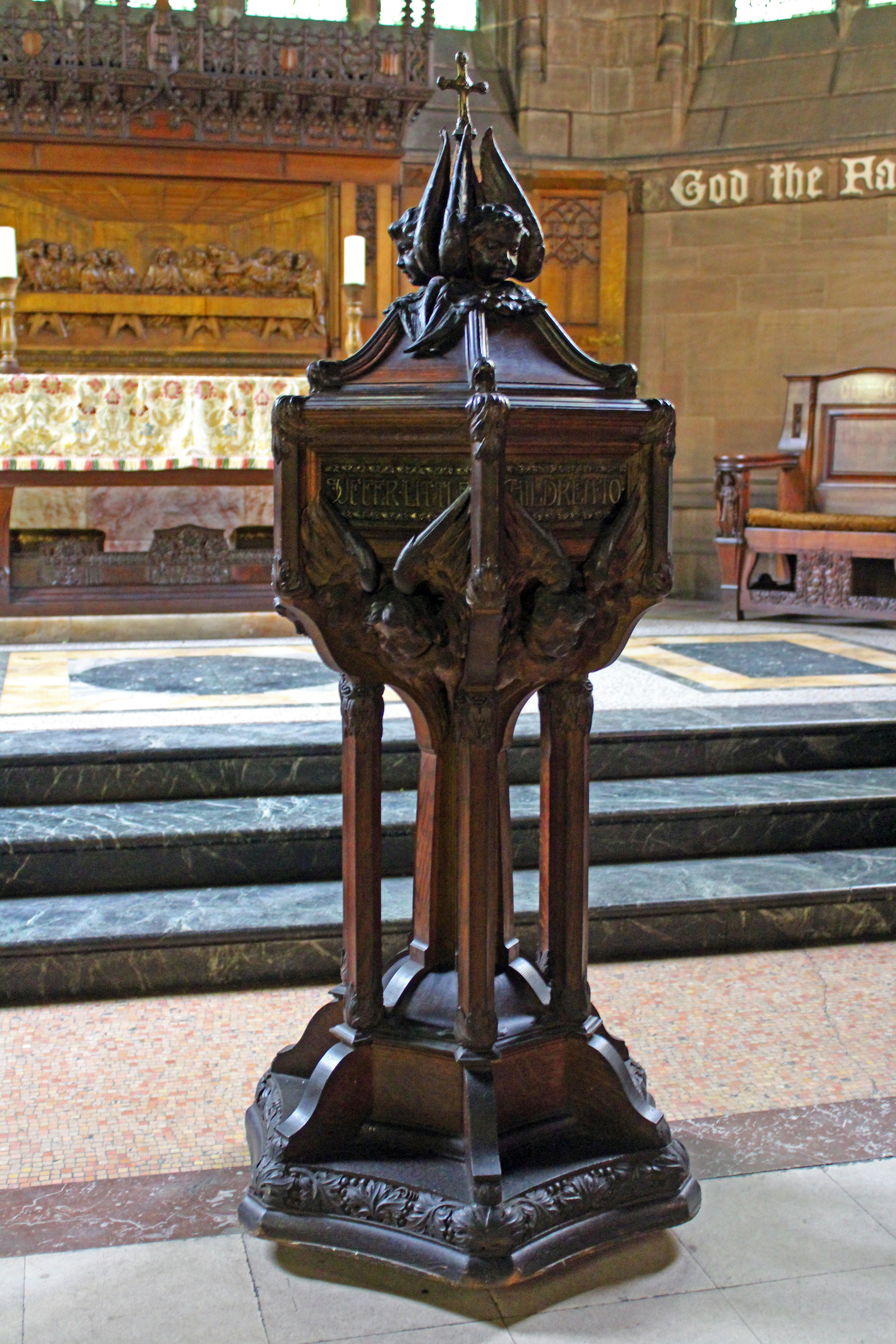
Font at Ullet Road Unitarian Church, Liverpool
