= Tom Murphy (artist) =

English artist

- Born: 1949 (age 76–77); Whiston, Lancashire, England
- Known for: Bronze sculpture
- Website: liverpoolsculptures.com

Tom Murphy (born 1949) is an English artist who is best known for his bronze sculptures.

Murphy is a self-taught artist, starting his artistic career initially as a hobby and moved quickly to an intense period of self-study, mastering a range of techniques in many art disciplines.

Previously he worked in a number of occupations which included; a seaman, salesman, musician and impressionist in a pop group.

Later he graduated as a teacher at Liverpool John Moores University and taught art at the Liverpool Community College. He also worked at a Centre for People with Learning Difficulties. His differing careers and interest in the characteristics of people have both acted as a rich source of inspiration in both his paintings and sculptures.

His early experimenting in painting was finally appreciated when he won first prize in the BBC 'North West Art 88' competition. His big success in sculpture came in 1996 when his 7 feet 6 inches (2.29 m) sculpture of John Lennon was seen by a representative of major Liverpool Company, Littlewoods. He was commissioned to sculpt two monumental size bronzes of the Moores brothers for Liverpool's premier shopping area Church Street.

His work is all over the city of Liverpool as well as in Chorley, Lancashire, Metropolitan Borough of Knowsley, Merseyside, Germany and New York City. He has also sold many smaller works around the world.

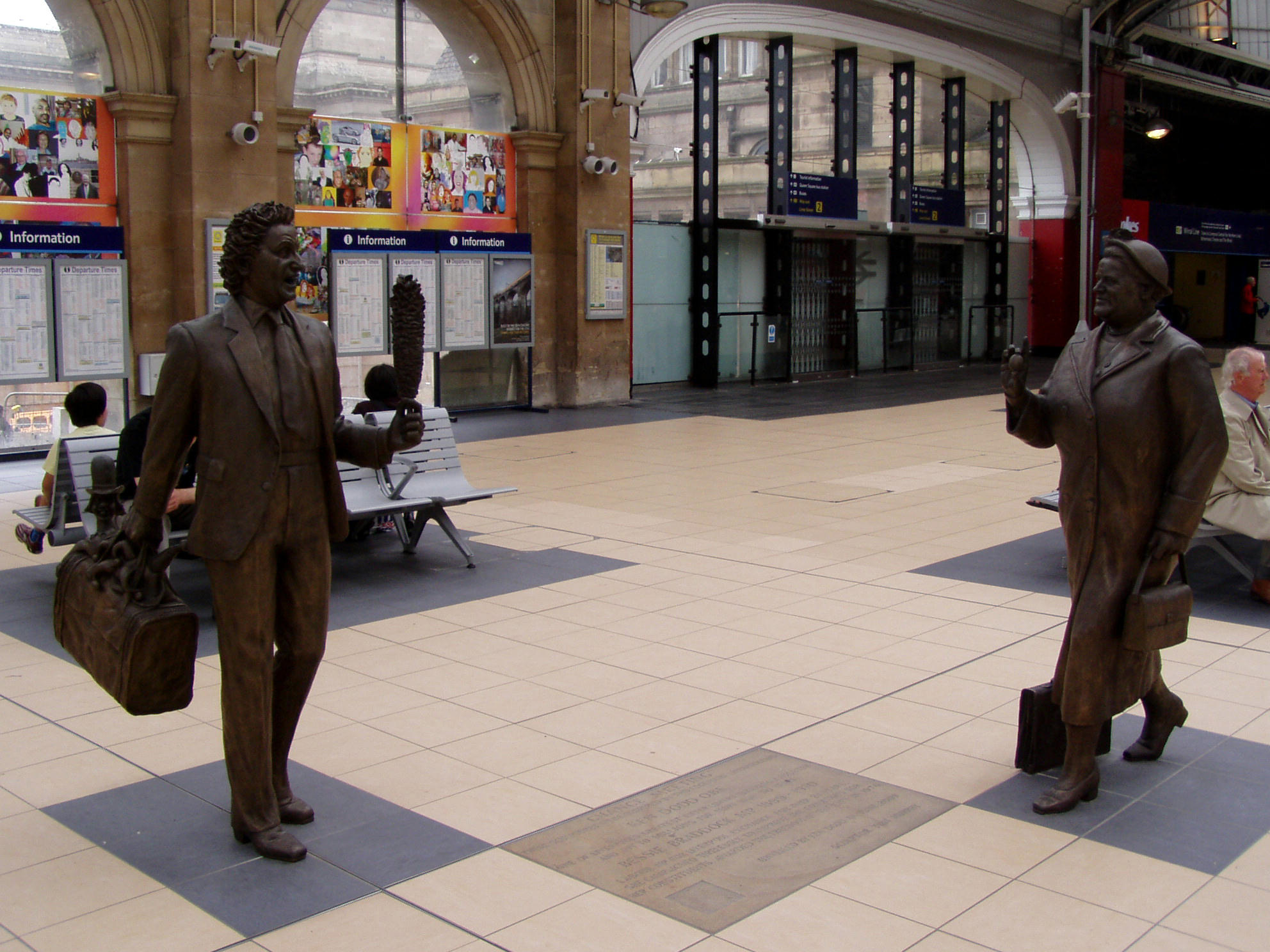
"Chance Meeting" sculpture of Ken Dodd and Bessie Braddock at Liverpool Lime Street station

In 2003, he was voted by Radio Merseyside listeners and Liverpool Echo readers as the 76th Greatest Merseysider.

Now his work is known all over the world since creating the iconic statue of John Lennon at Liverpool John Lennon Airport which was unveiled jointly on 15 March 2002, by Cherie Blair and Lennon's widow, Yoko Ono. His sculptures of Ken Dodd and Bessie Braddock, commissioned by Merseytravel are sited at Liverpool Lime Street railway station. Though best known for his large sculptures, he has always maintained his interest in a wide range of art disciplines and sectors. An accomplished painter, he has been commissioned to paint many key Merseyside figures including the official retirement portrait of Mr John Moores.

In 2015 his bronze sculpture of Trooper Potts VC and Trooper Andrews, of the Berkshire Yeomanry was unveiled by Chris Tarrant and the Lord Lieutenant of Berkshire. The Grandchildren of both Fred Potts and Arthur Andrews and many other descendants attended the unveiling ceremony along with Mayors and Chairs of Councils from across "Old Berkshire". Sited just outside Forbury Gardens, Reading Tom developed the design to appeal to children, young people and the military historian. Cast by the Morris Singer Foundry it has a high degree of finish and much historical detail, including items lying on the Gallipoli Battlefield.

In 2016 Tom sculpted a statue of John Ateyo for Bristol City Football Club, this was unveiled in November 2016 of that year outside Ashton Gate and commissioned by the Bristol City Supporters' Trust.

Recent works by Tom Murphy include a Bill Kenwright memorial bust on display at the Liverpool Empire Theatre. This was unveiled in March 2025. Tom was approached to create the bust in autumn 2023 following Kenwright's death.

== Recognition ==
Tom was awarded an Honorary Fellowship from Liverpool John Moores University in July 2014. Professor John Webster described Tom's career as to have 'documented and immortalised in bronze the characters that have shaped the city's and the nation's political, business and sporting legacy'.

In 2016 Tom received an honorary doctorate from the University of Liverpool.

In August 2017 Tom was made a Citizen of Honour of the City of Liverpool in a ceremony at Liverpool City Hall.

== Notable works ==
Title or subject	Medium	Date	Location	Image
Sir John and Cecil Moores	Bronze	1996	Church Street, Liverpool, outside the former Littlewoods store	
Diana, Princess of Wales	Plaster	1997	Liverpool Women's Hospital	
Bill Shankly	Bronze	1997	Anfield stadium, Liverpool	
Henry Egerton Cotton	Bronze	1998	John Moores University, Trueman Street, Liverpool	
Sir John Moores	Bronze	1998	Avril Robarts Library, Tithebarn Street, Liverpool	
Johnnie Walker DSO	Bronze	1998	Pier Head, Liverpool	
Liverpool Blitz memorial	Bronze	2000	Garden of the Church of Our Lady and Saint Nicholas, Pier Head, Liverpool	
Dixie Dean	Bronze	2001	Goodison Park, Liverpool	
John Lennon	Bronze	2002	Liverpool John Lennon Airport	
Billy Fury	Bronze	2003	Albert Dock, Liverpool	
Harold Wilson	Bronze	2006	Huyton, Merseyside	
Noel Chavasse VC & bar	Bronze	2008	Abercromby Square, Liverpool, and Trinity College, Oxford	
Bessie Braddock	Bronze	2009	Liverpool Lime Street station, in a grouping with the statue of Ken Dodd	
Ken Dodd	Bronze	2009	Liverpool Lime Street station, in a grouping with the statue of Bessie Braddock	
Hillsborough disaster memorial	Bronze	2013	Old Haymarket, Liverpool	
Liverpool Pals Memorial	Bronze relief	2014	Liverpool Lime Street station	
Fred Potts VC and Arthur Andrews	Bronze	2015	The Forbury, Reading, Berkshire	
Everton's Trinity of Colin Harvey, Howard Kendall, Alan Ball	Bronze	2019	Goodison Road, Liverpool	
