= Arthur Dooley =

British sculptor

Arthur John Dooley (17 January 1929 – 7 January 1994) was an English Marxist, artist, and sculptor.

== Biography ==
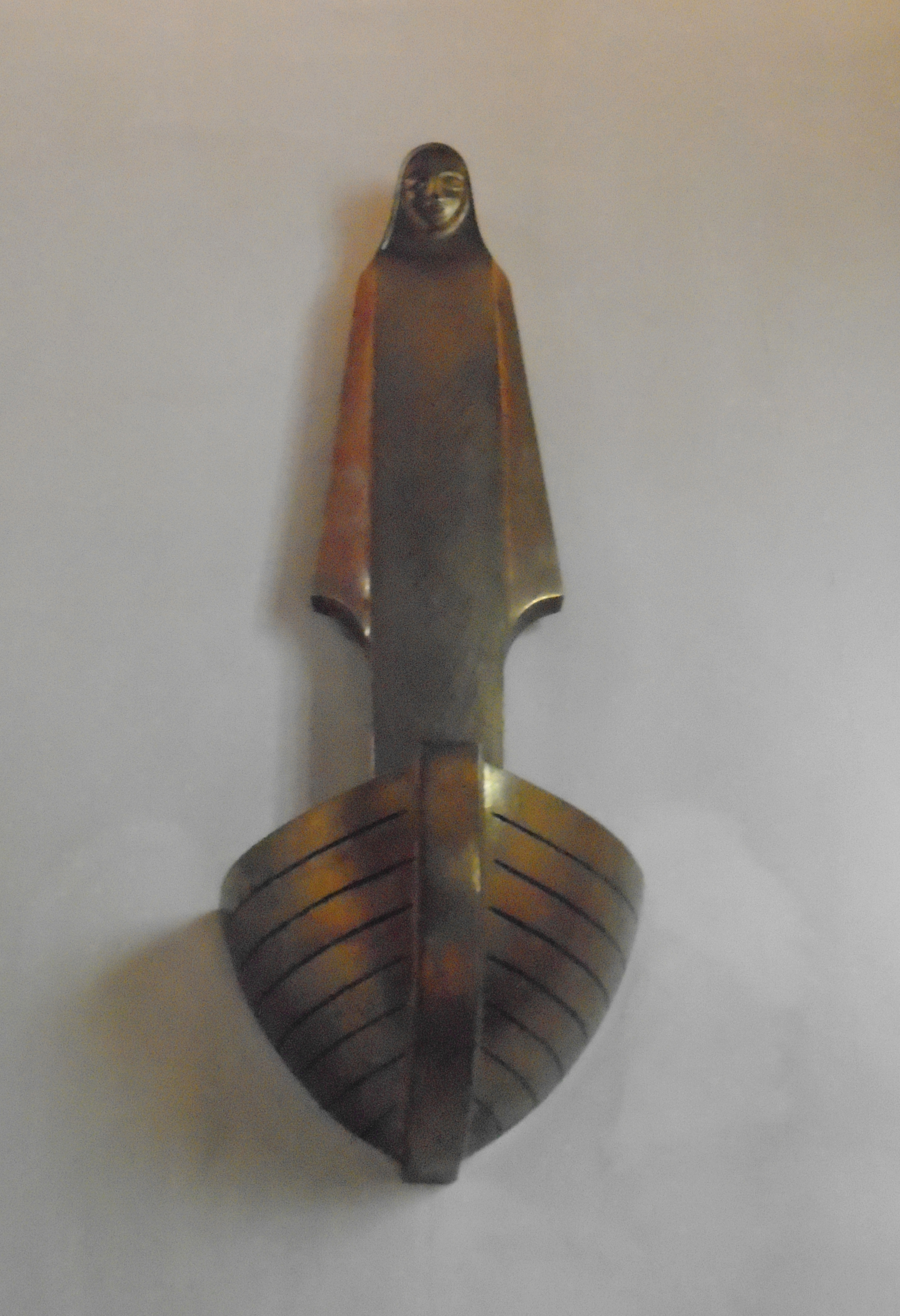
Our Lady of the Quays, Our Lady & St Nicholas, Liverpool

Born in the Dingle area of Liverpool, after leaving school at 14, Dooley began work as a welder at the Cammell Laird shipyard in Birkenhead. In 1945, Dooley enlisted in the Irish Guards and became a piper in the regiment's band. He served in Mandatory Palestine during the Palestine Emergency. Appalled by the treatment of Palestinians, he deserted his post to help them after the government decided to withdraw. During the civil war in Palestine, Dooley stole a tank and gave it to the Palestinians. He later turned himself in and served one year of a three-year sentence for desertion. After leaving the army, Dooley worked as a cleaner at Saint Martin's School of Art in London and enrolled in a drawing class at the Whitechapel Art Gallery. He became a student at St Martin's in 1953. Dooley had his first exhibition at the Gallery of the same name in 1962. Having decided he wanted to be a sculptor, he left London for Liverpool and set up a tiny studio; to support himself financially, he worked in the Dunlop Rubber Factory at Speke. In 1956, he set up a studio in Slater Street where he began to sculpt in earnest. An early notable work was the Fifteen Stations of the Cross in St Mary's Catholic Church, Leyland.

== Works ==
Dooley's medium was usually scrap-metal or bronze. He sculpted mainly religious works including the Risen Christ in the Liverpool Metropolitan Cathedral, Redemption (a collaborative work with Ann McTavish) in Liverpool's Anglican Cathedral, The Resurrection of Christ at Princes Park Methodist Church in Toxteth, a Madonna and Child at St Faith's Church in Crosby, and a sculpture entitled Splitting the Atom (depicting the creation of the atomic bomb) at Daresbury Laboratory, Cheshire. He also produced a tribute to The Beatles in Mathew Street, Liverpool, depicting The Madonna and The Beatles with the tribute Four lads who shook the world.

For the now-demolished 1971 Church of the Resurrection in Gatehouse of Fleet, Kirkcudbrightshire, Dooley created a metal sculpture of The Resurrected Christ on the sanctuary wall and a sculpture of Our Lady, now installed in St Andrew and St Cuthbert Church in Kirkcudbright.

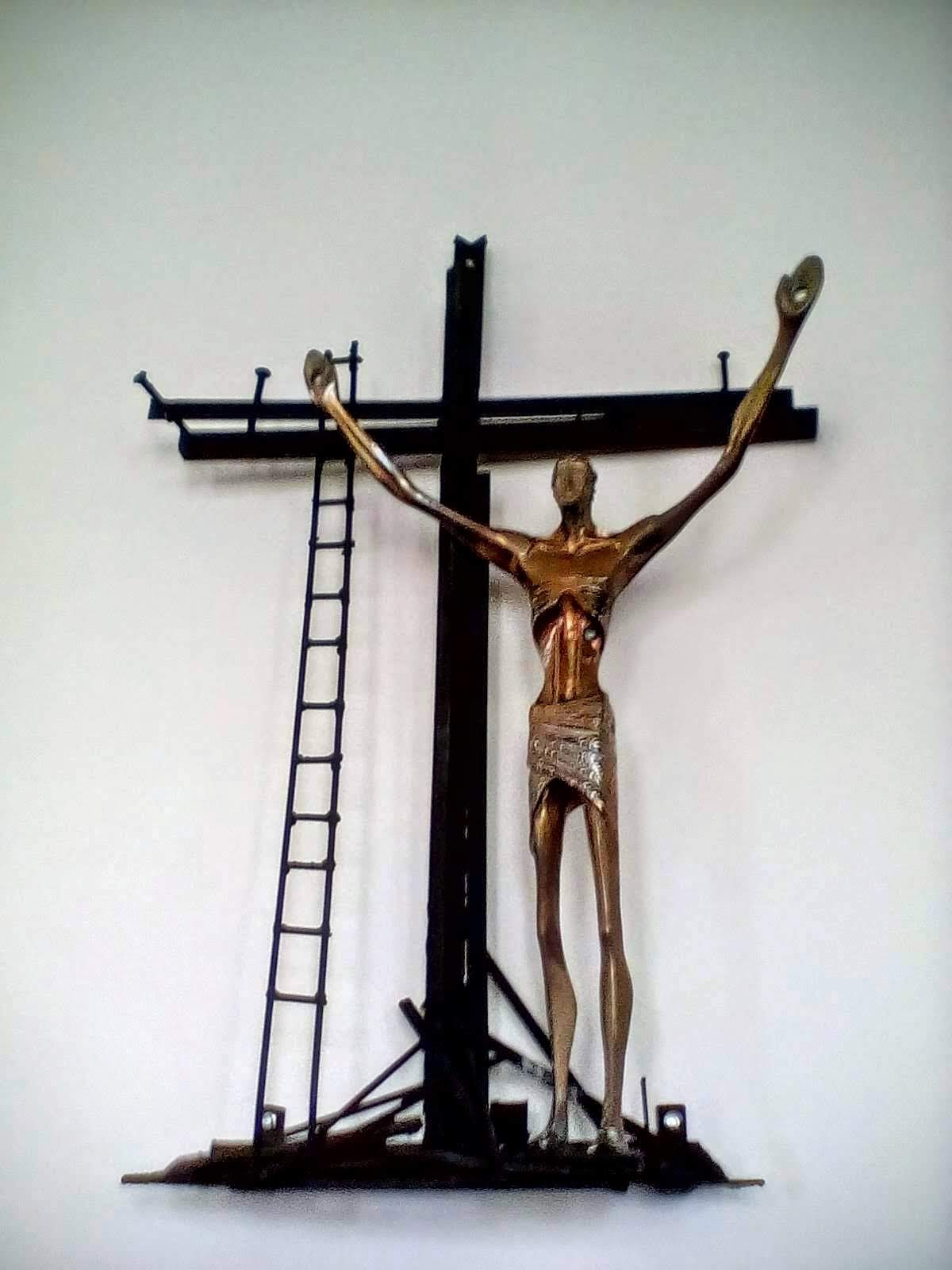
Christ Resurrected in St Andrew and St Cuthbert Church, Kirkcudbright

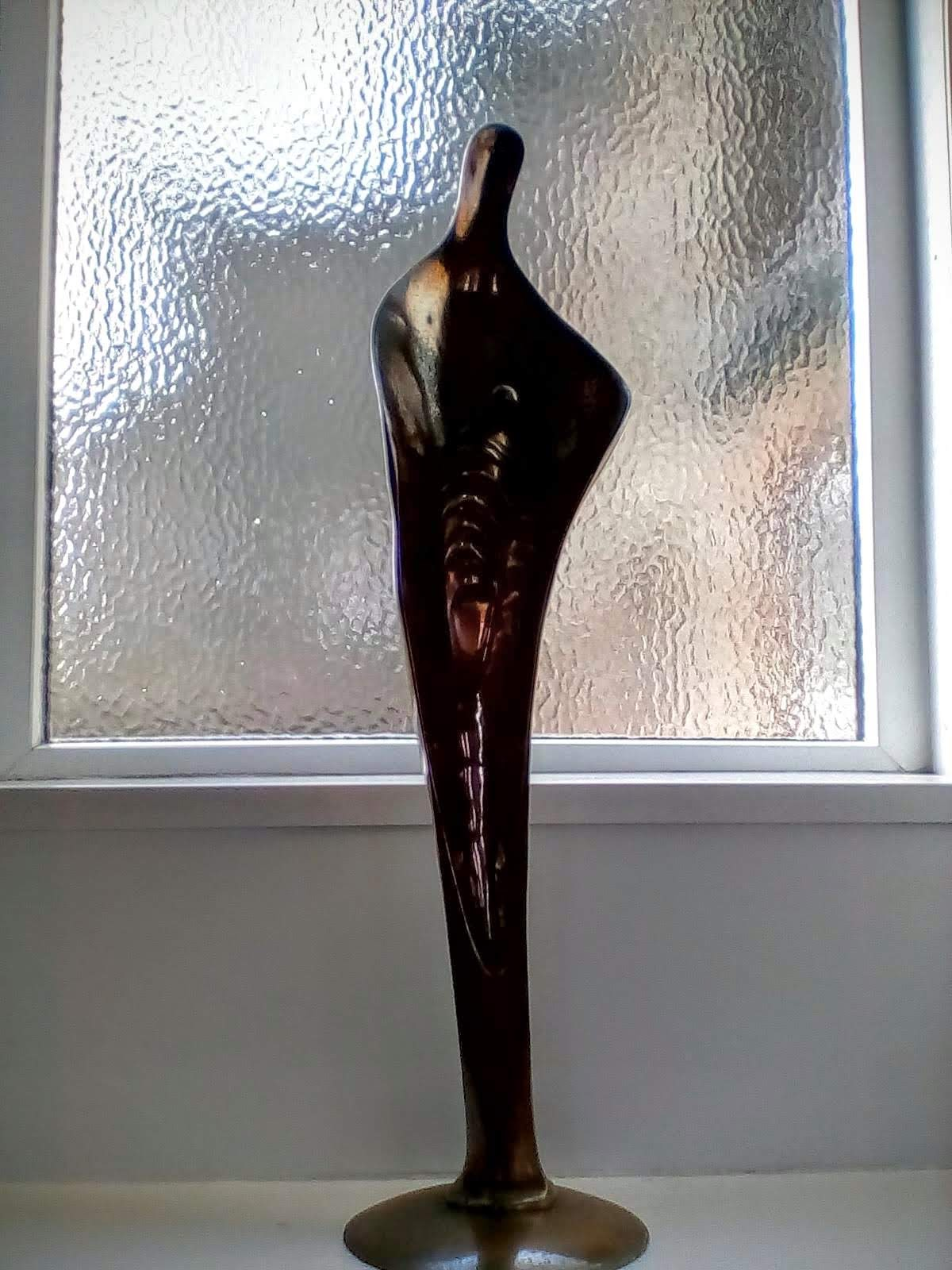
Our Lady in St Andrew and St Cuthbert Church, Kirkcudbright

One of his notable works Dachau is in Gallery Oldham. In honour of a famous union dispute he made The Fisher Bendix Tree, which included some parts from old radiators. This was purchased by Oldham Art Gallery but was never displayed. It was reportedly last seen rusting away in the yard of the gallery during the 1980s. Dooley was a subject of the television programme This Is Your Life in February 1970 when he was surprised by Eamonn Andrews. His studio in Liverpool was notoriously untidy, and is reportedly untouched since his death.

== Manchester Martyrs ==
To commemorate the 1967 centenary of the execution of the Manchester Martyrs, the Manchester Connolly Association commissioned Dooley to produce a memorial sculpture to stand on the site of New Bailey prison in Salford, where the martyrs had been hanged. There was opposition to the proposal, and it seems that the sculpture was never made, let alone installed. Dooley did however produce a foot-high maquette which now forms part of the collection of the Working Class Movement Library in Manchester. The maquette suggests that the memorial was to consist of a granite base with three standing steel pillars with attached Celtic shields each bearing a martyr's name as well as some detail of the event's significance. The maquette was donated to the WCML in 2011 by the family of Jud Cooper who had been given the maquette by Dooley.

== La Pasionaria ==
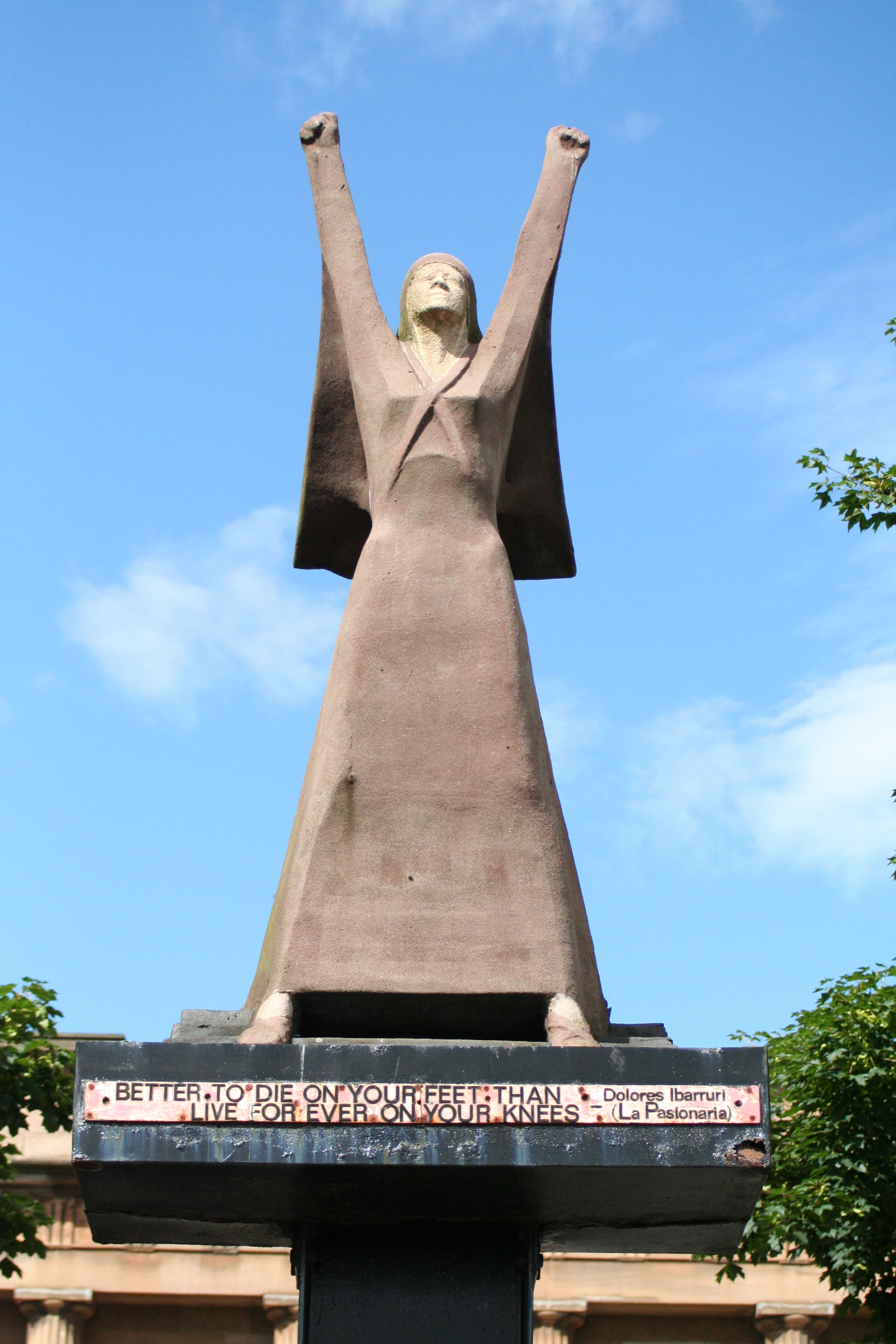
La Pasionaria statue in Glasgow, Scotland

Dolores Ibárruri, La Pasionaria, served as inspiration to Dooley who was commissioned in 1974 by the International Brigade Association of Scotland to create a monument commemorating the 2,100 British volunteers of the International Brigade, the men and women who joined the republican forces in the Spanish Civil War in their fight against Franco's nationalist and fascist rebels. The monument's inscription is dedicated to the 534 volunteers who died in the conflict, 65 of them from Glasgow, where the monument is situated.

The statue was funded by money raised by Trade Unionists and Labour movement supporters. However, the £3,000 raised was insufficient for the statue to be cast in bronze. Instead, an armature was welded together from scrap iron and covered in fibreglass. The final version of the monument is a stylised female figure, representing Dolores Ibarruri, in a long dress, standing with legs apart and arms raised. On the plinth, Dooley carved Dolores' famous slogan: 'better to die on your feet than live forever on your knees'. The phrase was first used by the Mexican revolutionary leader, Emiliano Zapata, but Ibarruri gave it new meaning when she used it during the miners strike in Asturias, Spain, in 1934.

Over time, the B listed statue fell into extremely poor condition and this generated criticism from the public, elected officials and trades unionists. A restoration project was carried out between April and August 2010 and the monument was re-dedicated on 23 August 2010 by Leader of the Council, Bailie Gordon Matheson, and General Secretary of the Scottish Trades Union Congress, Grahame Smith, in the presence of Thomas Watters, 97, a surviving International Brigade veteran. Watters was a veteran of the Scottish Ambulance Unit, which worked at the front line on the battlefields of Spain to aid wounded fighters and volunteers from across the world.
