= James Atherton (founder of New Brighton) =

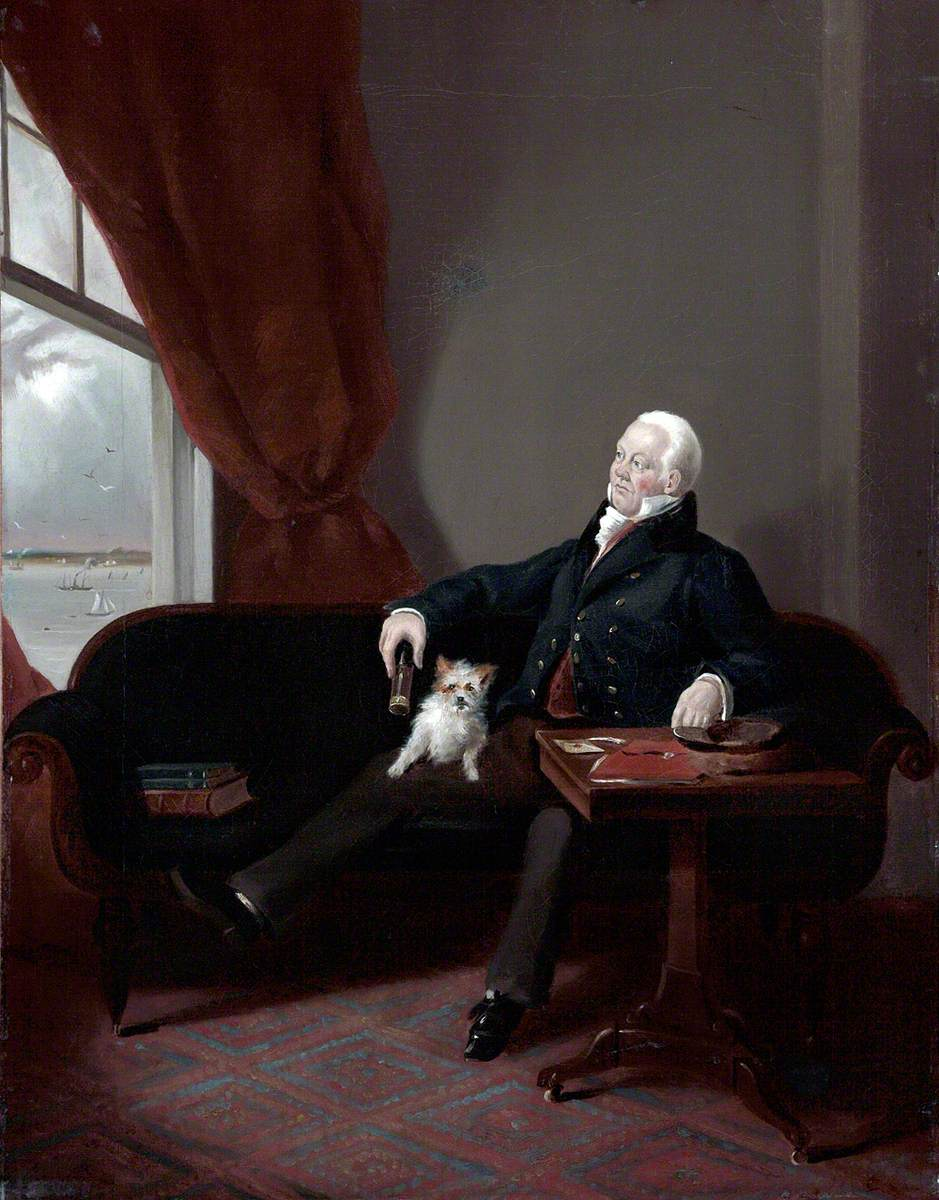
- James Atherton (1770–1838), British School, c.1830. Williamson Art Gallery and Museum, Birkenhead
- Born: 1770; Ditton, Widnes, Lancashire, England
- Died: 28 October 1838 (aged 67–68); Wirral, Cheshire, England
- Resting place: St. George's Church, Everton, Lancashire, England
- Occupation: Merchant
- Known for: Founding New Brighton, Wirral, Cheshire, England
- Spouse: Betty Rowson (m.1792–1838, his death)
- Relatives: Peter Atherton (pioneer of the early cotton industry)

James Atherton (1770 – 28 October 1838) was a British merchant and real estate developer known for his contributions to the economic and urban development of the Liverpool region in the late eighteenth and early nineteenth centuries. During this period, he was instrumental in transforming Everton into an affluent residential district and initiated the construction of the historically significant St George's Church. In association with his son-in-law William Rowson, he founded the seaside resort of New Brighton in 1832.

== Early life and career ==
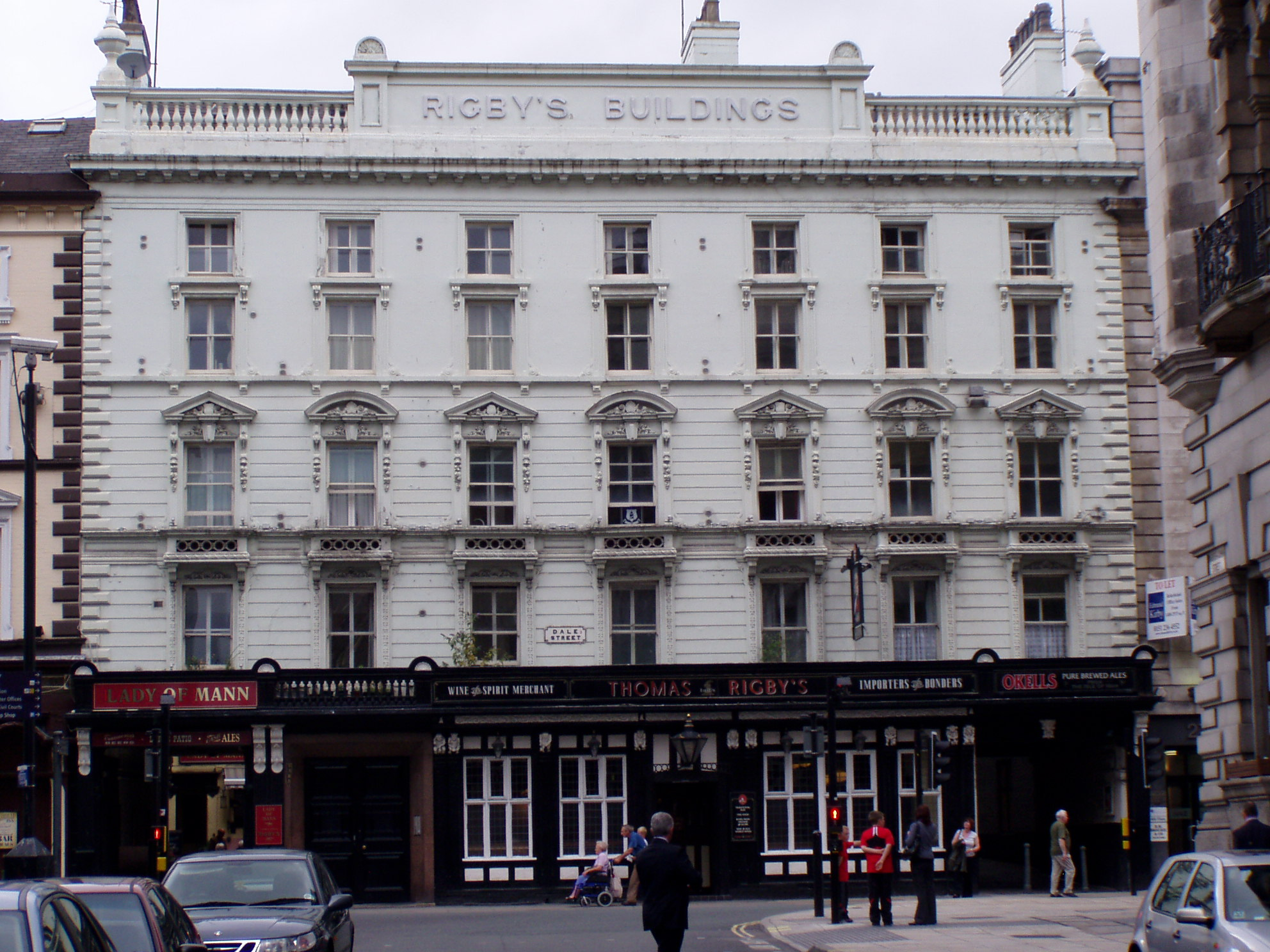
Rigby's Buildings (formerly Atherton Buildings), Dale Street, Liverpool

Born in Ditton, near Widnes, Lancashire (now Cheshire), James Atherton was the eighth of ten children (six boys and four girls) born to William Atherton (1732-1807), a Yeoman, and his wife Margaret, née Houghton. He was a cousin of cotton machinery manufacturer Peter Atherton, who had assisted Richard Arkwright and John Kay in developing the first working model of the Spinning Frame.

As a younger son with limited prospects of inheritance, James Atherton sought his fortune in the thriving commercial town of Liverpool, initially establishing himself as a grocer on Pool Lane (later South Castle Street). He married Elizabeth “Betty” Rowson at St Wilfrid's Church, Grappenhall, near Warrington, on 3 September 1792. Over the next six years, the couple welcomed four children: Mary (b. 1793), Margaret (b. 1795), Eliza (b. 1797), and James (b. 1798). The arrival of their fourth child coincided with the family’s move to larger premises on Dale Street, Liverpool, which served as both their residence and business headquarters. Atherton conducted his commercial affairs from these offices, known as Atherton Buildings (later Rigby's Buildings), for the rest of his life. It was during this period that Atherton began identifying himself as a merchant and actively invested in shipping companies. J.A. Picton, a Liberal politician and son of renowned Liverpool architect Sir James Picton wrote of Atherton that he was 'Ardent, bold, and daring in his character...', and that 'When in business, his transactions were gigantic in their scale....'

Despite the usual speculation surrounding wealthy Liverpool merchants of his time, there is no substantive evidence linking James Atherton to the Slave Trade. His name is notably absent from the lists of the Company of Merchants trading to Africa for the late eighteenth or early nineteenth century. John Atherton, no immediate relation, appeared on these lists, and the Victorian writer Gomer Williams inadvertently fused the two men in the index of his book on the history of Liverpool privateers, erroneously referring to both as the same ‘Mr Atherton’ throughout.

== Everton ==
In 1803, James Atherton moved his growing family to Everton, a hillside village approximately four miles northeast of Liverpool. Everton, within the parish of Walton-on-the-Hill, held historical significance as one of the six ancient berewicks of West Derby. Its elevated position provided fresh air and panoramic views spanning from the neighbouring city, across the River Mersey to the Cheshire Coast, and the distant hills of North Wales. During the late eighteenth century, Everton became an attractive retreat for Liverpool’s affluent merchant class.

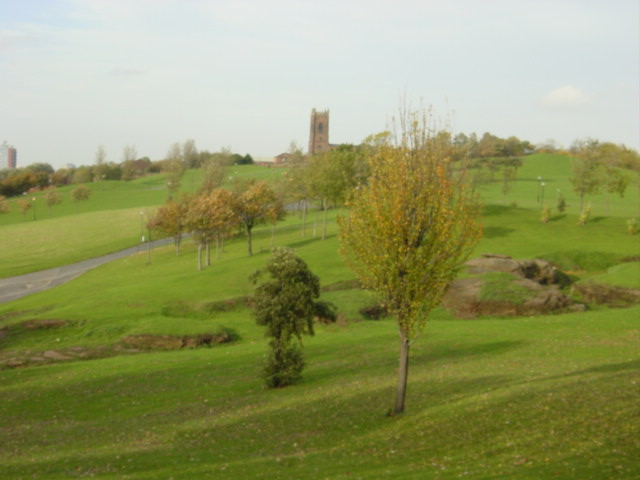
St. George's Church from Everton Park, evoking the area's eighteenth century tranquility.

Having acquired significant land holdings in the district, Atherton laid out several streets, whose names still endure, including Albion Crescent (now Albion Street), Northumberland Terrace, York Terrace, and Grecian Terrace. He adorned the area with exquisite houses and villas, particularly on Grecian Terrace, which were constructed in the style of the Cheltenham Villas. Historian Robert Syers confirmed that the properties had no rival at Everton. York Terrace later became the home of Anne Sharp, a close friend of novelist Jane Austen.

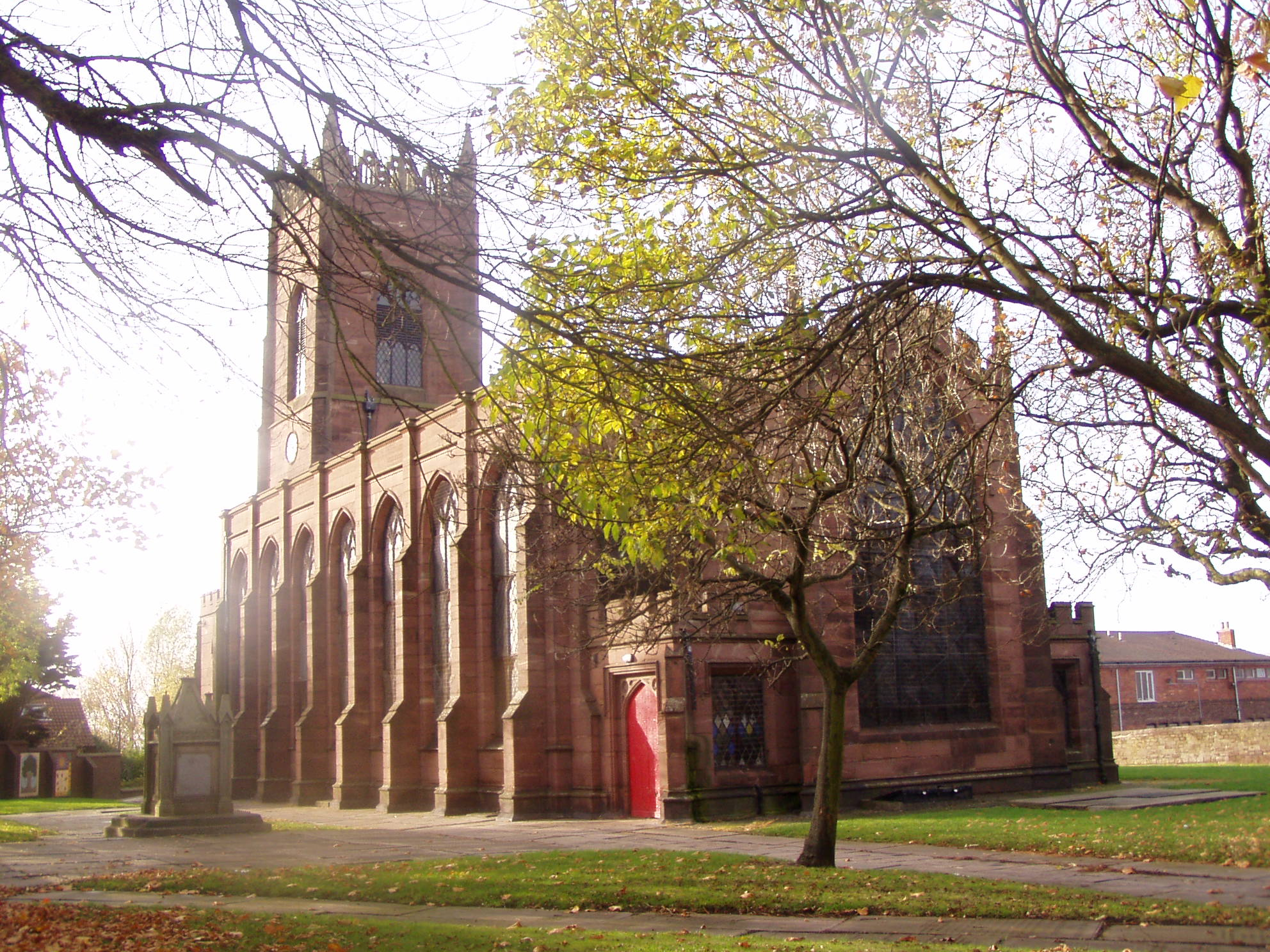
St George's Church, Everton

Picton described Atherton as ‘one of the most remarkable men that ever made Everton their abode', adding that 'everything he undertook was carried out on a scale of magnificence’. In accordance with his reputation for fine taste, Atherton erected his own ‘extensive and beautiful villa’ on Lodge Lane (now Northumberland Terrace), strategically positioned near the summit of Everton hill. He donated the land behind his villa, formerly occupied by the Everton beacon (prior to its destruction by a storm in 1803), for the construction of St George's Church. Designed by Thomas Rickman and built by John Cragg, the church cost £11,500, funded by subscription. Atherton and Robert J. Buddicom, the father of the first minister, held the largest shares, each contributing £1,000. Atherton played an integral role throughout the development process, overseeing the architect’s designs. His influence was reflected in the 1813 Act of Parliament, which safeguarded his villa’s privacy by stipulating that ‘no funerals at the church, or persons attending them, shall enter or retire through the western gate of the churchyard without the express permission of James Atherton or his heirs’. The foundation stone was laid on 19 April 1813, and eighteen months later, the Bishop of Chester consecrated the church on 26 October 1814. The Grade I listed building is historically significant as it was the first church in the world built with a cast iron frame, and one of the first civic buildings of any description so constructed. Its pioneering architectural design served as an inspiration for subsequent cast iron structures, including Liverpool’s iconic Royal Liver Building and the towering skyscrapers of New York City. St George's is one of only two world-renowned cast iron churches, both located in Liverpool, the other being St Michael's-in-the-Hamlet. During this period, and prior to the realisation of his ambitions across the River Mersey, his contemporary, the historian Robert Syers, provided a rare insight into the impression Atherton made on his peers: 'Moulded in a symmetrical frame, possessing a prepossessing person, of good or rather commanding address, of an apparently hale constitution, and gifted with a strong, intelligent mind, it may be assumed, nay, it must be granted, that Mr Atherton’s capabilities are of no common cast...’

During Atherton’s residency in Everton, he and his wife welcomed five more children: William, (b. 1803); Charles, (b. 1808); Caroline, (b. 1809); Henry Regent, (b. 1811) and George, (b. 1815). Tragically, in the last decade of their stay in Everton, they mourned the loss of three sons: James Jnr., Charles, and Henry Regent, aged nineteen, twenty-one, and twenty respectively.

== New Brighton ==
During the early to mid-eighteenth century, the British practice of ‘taking the waters’, traditionally associated with inland mineral spas such as Harrogate and Bath, experienced a transformation, gaining popularity in coastal areas. This shift in preference contributed to the emergence of fashionable seaside resorts, exemplified by Brighton in East Sussex.

From his villa on Everton Hill, Atherton observed the Cheshire Coast through a telescope and envisioned transforming the land near Black Rock sands, at the tip of the Wirral Peninsular, into an elegant seaside resort – a new Brighton, designed to serve as a retreat for the merchant class of Liverpool and the wider region.

In the early 1800s, the Wirral Peninsular retained its peaceful, secluded character, having undergone minimal changes over the preceding centuries. At its north-eastern tip lay the three townships of Wallasey, Poulton-cum-Seacombe, and Liscard. In 1830, Atherton and his son-in-law William Rowson negotiated with John Penkett, Lord of the Manor of Liscard, to acquire a substantial section of land, and on 24 January 1832, Rowson advanced a £200 deposit to Penkett for the ‘New Brighton Estate’. The total price paid for the 170-acre land, was £27,289. 8s. 0d. (£24,000, plus interest, paid in instalments over five years). Atherton and Rowson sold plots of land at prices ranging from 7s. 6d. to 10s. per yard, making a substantial profit.

Despite notable structures such as the battery at Fort Perch Rock, completed in 1829 to defend the port of Liverpool, its docks and shipping during times of war, and the Perch Rock Lighthouse, which became operational in 1830, the area largely comprised ‘a mere heap of sand-hills’, as noted by contemporary historian William Williams Mortimer. Retrospectively, A.B Granville, in his book The Spas of England (1841), acknowledged that ‘It must have required some courage to have planted the first dwelling-house on such a waste, and still more to have expected to attract others to follow the example.’ However, as Anthony M. Miller explained in his social history of New Brighton, although ‘…no basic platform existed from which to launch the resort…There was a plan, a pre-conceived and elaborate master-plan, based upon a purposeful and coherent programme which focussed its attention upon the area’s obvious natural advantages…’

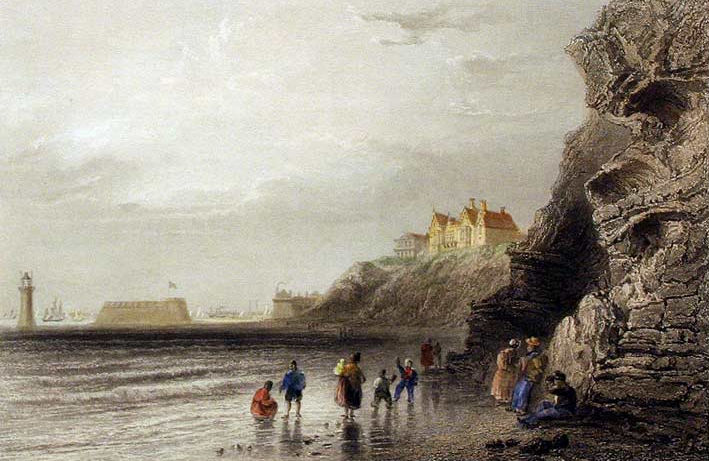
Hand-coloured steel engraving entitled New Brighton, c. 1840, depicting New Brighton Lighthouse, Fort Perch Rock and villas above the Noses.

In their October 1832 prospectus for New Brighton, Atherton and Rowson prioritised constructing a ‘handsome Hotel’, a dock, and initiating a steam packet service between the fledgling resort and Liverpool. They estimated an investment of £12,000 would cover the costs, intending to raise it through shares priced at £100 each. These plans swiftly materialised; construction of a wooden pier commenced the following year and soon after, the first ‘New Brighton Hotel’ on what is now Victoria Road was completed. In the prospectus, Atherton and Rowson articulated their plans to erect ‘a Church, Market place, Shops and Buildings that will include a Reading Room, Baths, Billiard room, Post Office, etc.,’ assuring potential investors that ‘nothing will be left undone to make it a most attractive and fashionable Watering Place’. Within a few short years, the founders had largely realised their vision. As Granville confirmed during his visit to New Brighton in 1840, ‘The colony, new as it is, enjoys already all the luxuries of an old settlement. It has its pump-house, its billiard and its news room, with livery-stables, and other conveniences,’ including bathing machines, neatly arranged on ‘the delightful sands’, and stretching for five miles. Granville concluded that ‘New Brighton, in fine, is a curious and extraordinary settlement of its kind, worthy of being visited, and I doubt not answering, in the summer, every purpose for which it was intended.’ He further noted that it was ‘the sea-bathing rendezvous, par excellence, of the Lancashire people of note…’ The realisation of Atherton's ambitions echoed Syers's prophetic acknowledgement of his capabilities years earlier. Syers had presciently observed of him that 'The united and congregated exertions of a score of such men could, at any time, convert an insignificant village into a town of consequence and renown...', concluding that 'Mr Atherton is not only a man of ten thousand, but of a million’.

Atherton and Rowson, having constructed marine villas in the resort for their families, attracted notable citizens from Liverpool and the wider region to build homes on the sandstone cliffs facing the sea, known affectionately as the Red and Yellow Noses. The architectural styles of these villas ranged from Gothic to Lombard and Elizabethan. Among the early inhabitants was Daniel Neilson, the ship-owner, whose residence named ‘Redcliffe’ was designed by the celebrated Victorian architect Harvey Lonsdale Elmes, the principal architect for St George’s Hall, Liverpool. The founders’ family friends were also drawn to the area, including Peter Greenall, a member of the famous North-West brewing family, and Joseph Christopher Ewart, the wealthy Liverpool broker and later M.P. for the city (third son of the great Liverpool merchant William Ewart, who was in turn the namesake of future Prime Minister William Ewart Gladstone). As a fellow Everton landowner, William Ewart had earlier contributed £100 to the construction of St George's Church.

== Death and legacy ==
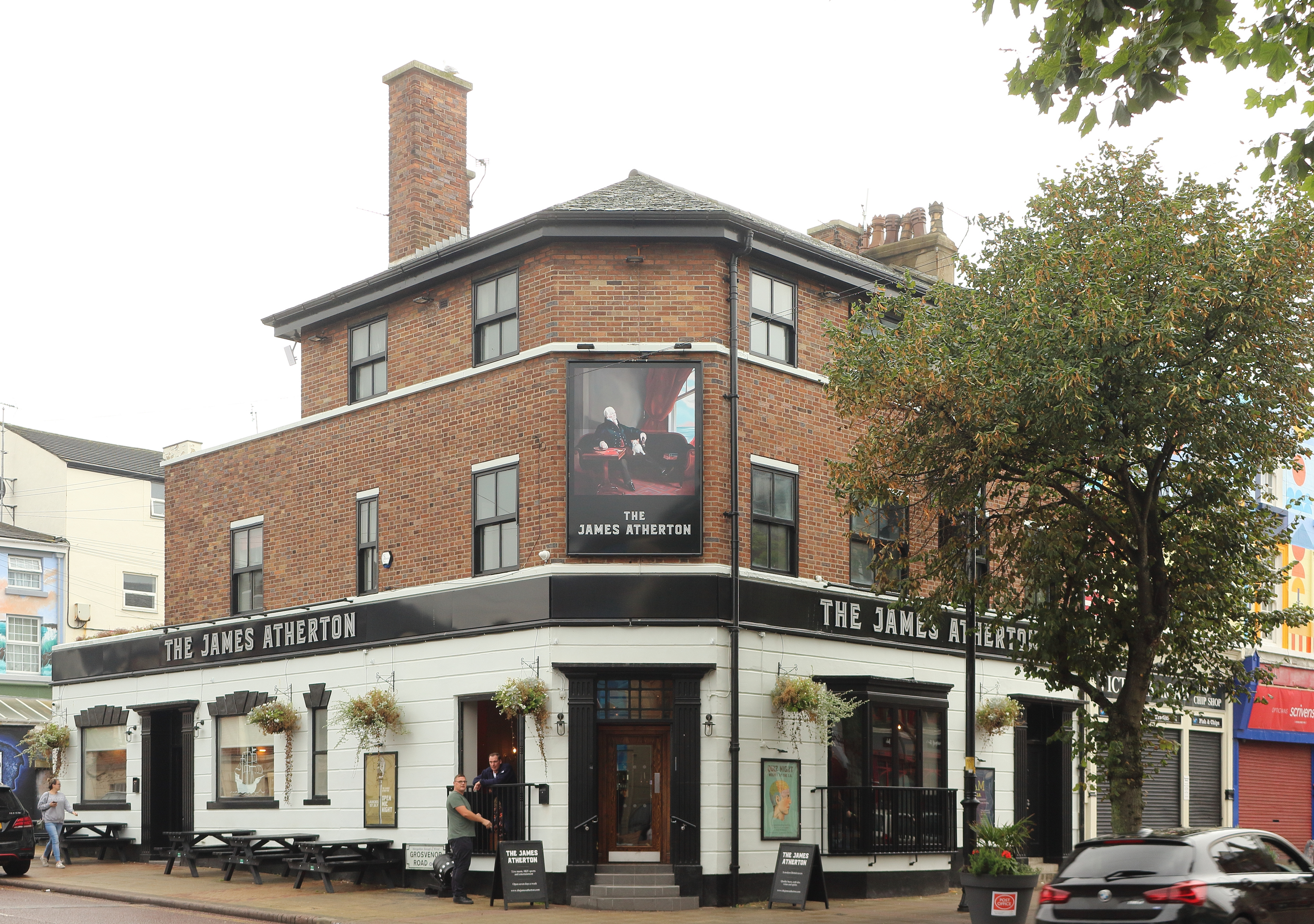
'The James Atherton' Pub, New Brighton.

James Atherton died on 28 October 1838, aged sixty-eight. In accordance with his wishes, he was laid to rest in the family grave at St George’s Church, Everton. Atherton’s legacy includes the development of Everton as a residential district, which would accelerate in the decades following his death, as the villas and pleasure grounds of the wealthy gave way to rows of terraced housing. The streets he laid out and named in Everton survive, although the housing itself is of a different character. His most enduring contribution to the area was his role in facilitating the construction of the remarkable St George’s Church. His memory is further perpetuated in those places named in his honour, notably Atherton Close, Everton, near the site of his former villa, and Atherton Street in New Brighton. More recently, a notable public house in the resort was renamed ‘The James Atherton’.

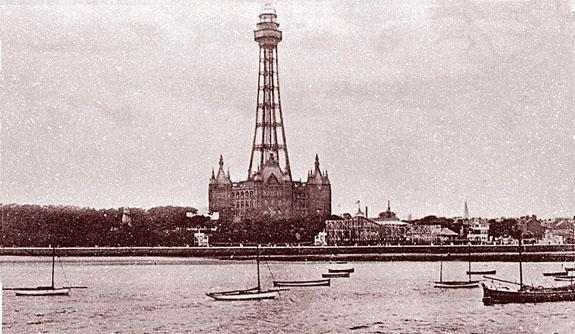
New Brighton Tower, and the four-storey redbrick Tower Building, once the tallest structure in the United Kingdom.

Historian Anthony M. Miller has described Atherton’s death in 1838 as a ‘body blow to the young community at New Brighton’, adding that ‘The strength of character and instinctive discernment he showed during his lifetime would be sorely missed.’ Nevertheless, Miller concludes that by the end of Atherton’s life, the resort’s population was ‘steadily increasing’ and that it was ‘quickly acquiring an individual identity of its own’. Ultimately, ‘his pet colony’, as Picton called it, would evolve from a ‘watering place’ for the Lancastrian elite to a popular seaside resort for working people, reaching the height of its popularity in the late-nineteenth and first half of the twentieth century.

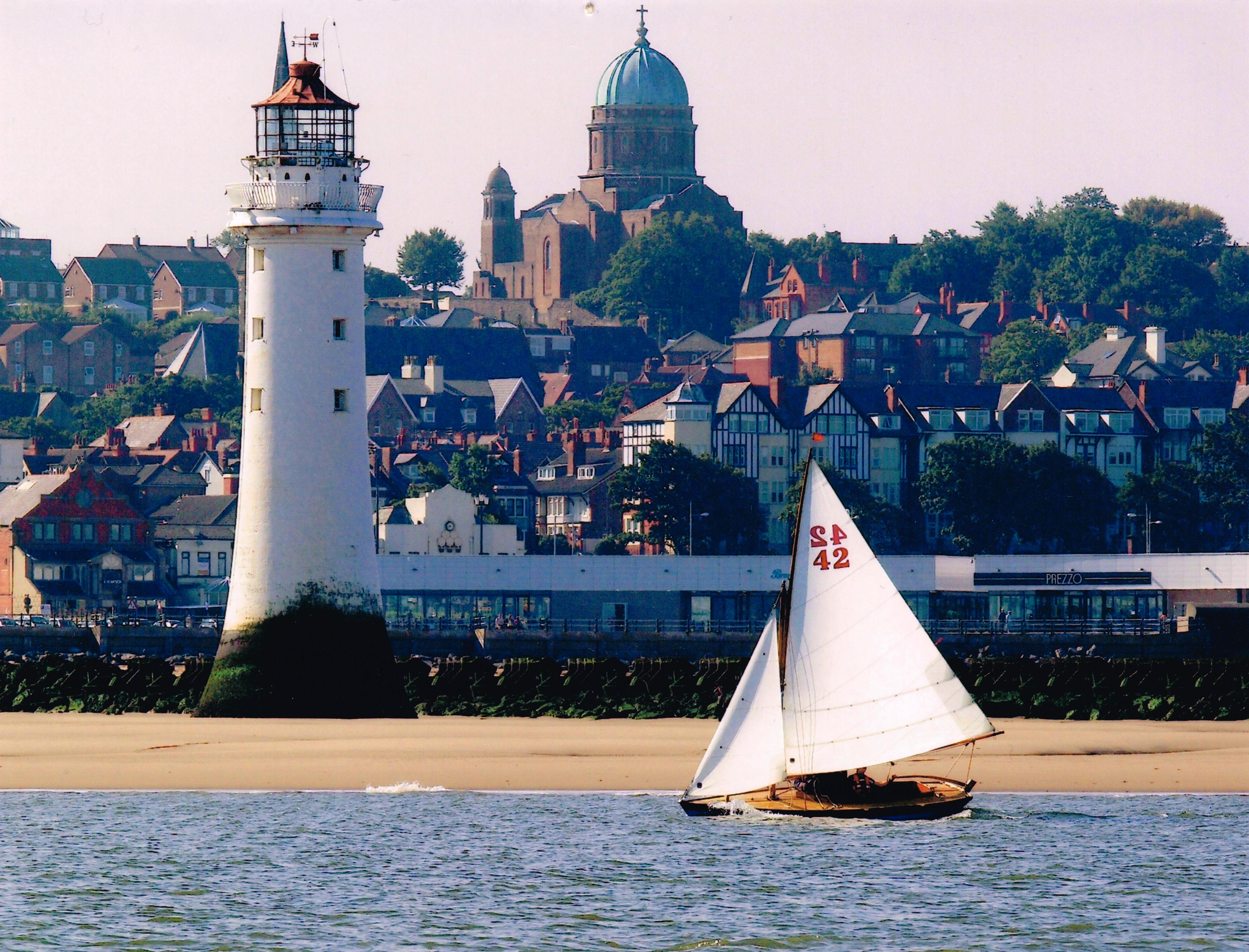
New Brighton, Wirral, 2015.

Although New Brighton’s popularity as a seaside resort declined markedly after the Second World War, the resort’s Tower Ballroom prolonged its life as an entertainment destination. New Brighton’s rich musical heritage can be traced to British composer Sir Granville Bantock’s leadership of the Tower’s concert band in 1897, at which time such luminaries as Sir Edward Elgar and Sir Hubert Parry came to the resort to conduct and perform. In the 1950s and 1960s, the Tower Ballroom hosted both local acts and international stars, including The Beatles, who performed at the venue no less than twenty-seven times between 1961 and 1963 - more than at any other location in the United Kingdom, aside from the Cavern Club in Liverpool. The Tower Ballroom also held the distinction of accommodating the largest attendance for a Beatles concert on the British mainland, with the group playing to 4,500 people on 21 November 1961. The venue's destruction by fire in 1969 marked the end of an era for the resort.
