= Grade I listed buildings in Liverpool =

There are over 2,500 listed buildings in Liverpool, England. (Note: The actual list consists of 1,471 individual entries, which cover over 2,500 buildings and structures throughout the city) A listed building is one considered to be of special architectural, historical or cultural significance, which is protected from being demolished, extended or altered, unless special permission is granted by the relevant planning authorities. Of the listed buildings in Liverpool, 29 are classified as Grade I and are recognised as buildings of outstanding architectural or historic interest. The following list provides information on all the Grade I listed buildings in the city.

In Liverpool, several of the Grade I buildings are recognised for their architectural importance, including the Albert Dock, which was the first non-combustible warehouse system in the world; and Oriel Chambers, which was the world's first metal framed, glass curtain walled building. The Liver Building is also recognised as one of the first reinforced concrete buildings constructed in the United Kingdom.

The oldest Grade I listed building in Liverpool is the Tudor manor house, Speke Hall, whose exterior largely dates from the 15th and 16th centuries. A small portion of All Saints' Church dates from the 14th century, although the majority was added later. The newest building on the list is the neo-Gothic Liverpool Cathedral, which was not completed until 1980, some 76 years after it was started. Most of the buildings on the list date from the Georgian and Victorian eras, the period during which Liverpool grew rapidly from a relatively small provincial coastal town into one of the most important ports in the world.

Of the 29 buildings in the list, 12 are places of worship, including the city's Anglican Cathedral, six Anglican churches, three Unitarian churches or chapels, a restaurant, a Roman Catholic church and a Synagogue. Five of the remaining 17 buildings in the list are located at the Albert Dock and comprise the largest single collection of Grade I listed buildings anywhere in England.

== Buildings ==
Building(s)	Location	Image	Built	Notes	Coordinates	Ref
Speke Hall	Speke Hall Road		1490–1506; 1540–60; 1598 (Note: The southern portion of hall was built between 1490 and 1506, with the eastern and western ranges between 1540 and 1560. The northern range is dated 1598)		53.3368°N 2.8745°W	
Church of All Saints	Childwall Abbey Road		14th–19th centuries (Note: The oldest portion of the church dates to the 14th century with the aisle and porch believed to be 15th-century. Further additions are dated to the 18th century with tower and spire built between 1810–11 and the north aisle dated to 1833. Parts of the church were rebuilt between 1900–05)	All Saints' Church is an active Church of England parish church. Its oldest portion – the chancel – dates from the 14th century, making it the only Medieval church in Liverpool. The Gothic influence is maintained in later additions, such as with the clock tower, which incorporates both gargoyles and tracery windows and is topped by a needle spire. It has a central nave leading to a wagon vaulted chancel, with north and south aisles. It has two chapels, the Salisbury Chapel was built 1739–40, with the Plumbe Chapel built in 1777. Inside, there is a rare painted memorial to Major Pitcairn Campbell, as well as a brass chandelier dated 1737 and Royal Arms of England from 1664.	53.3953°N 2.8815°W	
Toxteth Unitarian Chapel	Park Road		1618		53.3813°N 2.9579°W	
Woolton Hall	Speke Road		1704		53.3715°N 2.8649°W	
Bluecoat Chambers	School Lane		1717	Bluecoat Chambers is today an art gallery and the original home of the Blue Coat School founded by Bryan Blundell. The building forms a U-shape with a five-bay central portion rising two storeys and the 11-bay wings being three storeys tall. All the windows on the central portion are round-headed with architraves and cherub keystones. The middle bays of the centre portion extend forward from the main wall and are topped with a pediment. The building's main entrance features a round-headed Ionic aedicule entrance with steps, topped with a frieze and segmental pediment containing the arms of Liverpool. The interior of the building is largely post war.	53.4041°N 2.9839°W	
Railings, gates and gate piers of Bluecoat Chambers	School Lane		1717	The entrance railings, gates and gate piers of Bluecoat Chambers were built at the same time as the building itself. The entrance consists of decorated and crested wrought iron gates attached to stone gate piers with panelled rustication, entablatures and pyramidal caps. From these, extending in either direction, are two low brick walls topped with iron railings.	53.4044°N 2.9838°W	
Liverpool Town Hall	Water Street		1749–54		53.4072°N 2.9916°W	
Church of St. George	Heyworth Street		1812–14	The Church of St. George is an active Church of England parish church. It was designed by Thomas Rickman and John Cragg and was constructed from ashlar stone in a perpendicular style common to English Gothic architecture. The church consists of a nave, short chancel and west tower with adjoining low porches. The tower is supported by diagonal buttresses and features clock faces on three sides. The building is noted for its use of cast iron, which was provided by the Mersey Iron Foundry owned by Cragg. The iron was not only used structurally, but also in the tracery windows and arcades. The church also features stained glass windows designed by Shrigley and Hunt.	53.4252°N 2.9714°W	
Church of St Michael	St. Michael’s Church Road		1814		53.3766°N 2.9498°W	
The Oratory	Upper Duke Street		1829		53.3987°N 2.9732°W	
Albert Dock Warehouse A	Albert Dock		1841–45	Warehouse A, commonly known as the Atlantic Pavilion, is located at the southern end of the eastern side of the Albert Dock. The warehouse is five storeys tall and 17 bays long, with brick and stone cladding around an iron frame. On the dock facing side, the ground floor is recessed and is lined with doric-style iron columns.	53.4000°N 2.9911°W	
Albert Dock Warehouses B and C	Albert Dock		1841–45	Warehouses B and C, commonly referred to as the Britannia Pavilion and Colonnades, are located to the south and west of the dock respectively. Standing five storeys tall, the warehouses form an L-shape around the south-western corner of the dock, extending for 47 bays along the southern and 55 along the western sides. In common with the other warehouses, the ground floor is recessed alongside the dock side and lined with doric-style iron columns. Additionally, there are two deeper recesses in the Britannia Pavilion and three in the Colonnades, all stretching for nine bays.	53.3990°N 2.9932°W	
Albert Dock Warehouse D	Albert Dock		1841–45	Warehouse D is located on the northern side of the dock and is home to the Merseyside Maritime Museum. Similar is shape and size to the Atlantic Pavilion, it is five storeys tall and 17 bays wide, with brick and stone cladding around an iron frame. It has a recessed dock-side ground floor, lined with doric-style iron columns.	53.4013°N 2.9928°W	
Albert Dock Warehouse E	Albert Dock		1841–45	Warehouse E, commonly referred to as the Edward Pavilion, is located on the northern portion of the eastern side of the dock. The warehouse is five storeys tall and 17 bays wide, with brick and stone dressing around an iron frame. The dock-side ground level is recessed and lined with doric-style iron columns.	53.4012°N 2.9918°W	
St George’s Hall	St George's Plateau		1841–56		53.4087°N 2.9803°W	
Bank of England Building	Castle Street		1845–48	The Bank of England Building was constructed as one of three regional Bank of England branches during the mid-19th century. Designed by C.R. Cockerell in neo-Classical style it is three storeys tall, three bays wide and seven bays deep. The top floor is separated from the lower floors by an entablature with an Ionic column colonnade on the Castle street facing side. The building is topped with an open pediment and 'heavy bracketed' cornice. The ground and first floor tripartite windows are recessed with round headers, with the first floor windows having iron balconies.	53.4062°N 2.9903°W	
Albert Dock Traffic Office	Albert Dock		1846–48	The Dock Traffic Office was constructed at the Albert Dock shortly after the completion of the warehouse buildings. The lower portion was designed by Philip Hardwick and built between 1846 and 47, with the top storey – designed by Jesse Hartley – being added in 1848. The building consists of three storeys above ground and a basement. It is noted of its Tuscan style portico and pediment, which incorporates a 36 ft long, single cast architrave.	53.4015°N 2.9921°W	
Oriel Chambers	Water Street		1864		53.4065°N 2.9932°W	
Church of St. John the Baptist	West Derby Road		1868–70		53.4248°N 2.9300°W	
Princes Road Synagogue	Princes Road		1872–74		53.3952°N 2.9650°W	
Church of All Hallows	Allerton Road		1872–76	The Church of All Hallows is an active Church of England parish church. Constructed from stone with a slate roof, it consists of a four-bay nave with aisles under lean-to roofs, transepts, a western church tower, a chancel with vestry and an organ loft. Most of the church's stained glass windows were designed by Edward Burne-Jones and are considered to be one of the most complete sets by Burne-Jones. The aisle windows are mainly tracery in form and the nave has clerestory windows situated above the lean-to roofs of the aisles. Inside the church the chancel is partly decorated with marble. To the south-east is a mausoleum to the family of John Bibby, who financed the church's construction and whose wife it was built in honour of. It is noted for its angled buttresses and panelled & embattled parapet, as well as its cusped arched entrance.	53.3807°N 2.9037°W	
Church of St. Agnes and St. Pancras	Ullet Road		1883–85	The Church of St. Agnes and St. Pancras is an active Church of England parish church. It was designed by J.L. Pearson from brick with stone dressings and a tile roof. The church consists of a central aisle with parallel aisles under lean-to roofs, with east and west transepts and a chapel. There is also a first floor gallery with an arcaded balustrade and the interior features numerous angel depictions, as well as stained glass windows designed by Charles Eamer Kempe. The building was described by Nikolaus Pevsner as "The noblest Victorian church in Liverpool"	53.3896°N 2.9398°W	
Church of St. Clare	Arundel Avenue		1888–90	The Church of St. Clare is an active Roman Catholic parish church. Designed in Neo-Gothic style by Leonard Stokes, the church is brick built with stone dressings and a slate roof. It consists of a single vessel, north and south chapels and a small transept to the north. There are six recessed tracery windows on the northern side and southern sides. The western end has an ornately patterned seven-panel tracery window with broad weathered sills and large chamfered mullions. The east has a five-panel tracery window with relieved arch and weathered sill, with the stained glass depicting the crucifixion and saints. Internally the church is ten bays long with a wagon-vaulted roof supported by deep splayed internal buttresses	53.3910°N 2.9368°W	
Philharmonic Dining Rooms	Hope Street		1898	No. 36	53.4018°N 2.9705°W	
Unitarian Chapel	Ullet Road		1898		53.3898°N 2.9380°W	
Unitarian Church Hall	Ullet Road		1901		53.3898°N 2.9376°W	
Liverpool Cathedral	St James' Mount		1904–80	Liverpool Cathedral is the city's Church of England Cathedral and is part of the Anglican Diocese of Liverpool. It was designed in Gothic Revival style by Sir Giles Gilbert Scott and is constructed from red sandstone sourced from a quarry in nearby Woolton. The Cathedral's construction lasted over 75 years, spanning both world wars and the result is that the building standing today is vastly different from the initial design chosen. Today, Liverpool Cathedral stands as the largest cathedral in the United Kingdom and one of the largest in the world. It is regarded as one of the greatest buildings constructed during the 20th century.	53.3974°N 2.9732°W	
Royal Liver Building	George's Pier Head		1908–10		53.4056°N 2.9960°W	
Liverpool Cenotaph	St George's Plateau		1927–30	Originally a memorial to those who fell in the First World War, the dates of the Second World War were added later. The cenotaph was designed by Lionel Budden, with carving by Herbert Tyson Smith. It consists of a rectangular block of stone with bronze low-relief sculptures on the sides depicting marching soldiers and mourners.	53.40852°N 2.97949°W	
Liverpool Metropolitan Cathedral	Mount Pleasant		1962–67	The Roman Catholic Cathedral for the Archdiocese of Liverpool. The crypt was built in 1933 to 1941 to designs by Sir Edwin Lutyens but the rest of his cathedral was unbuilt. A competition for a new cathedral to stand above the crypt was held in 1959 to 1960, and won by Frederick Gibberd. The cathedral was constructed in 1962 to 1967 to designs by Frederick Gibberd and Partners.	53°24′17″N 2°58′08″W	

== See also ==
Architecture of Liverpool
