= The Iron Church =

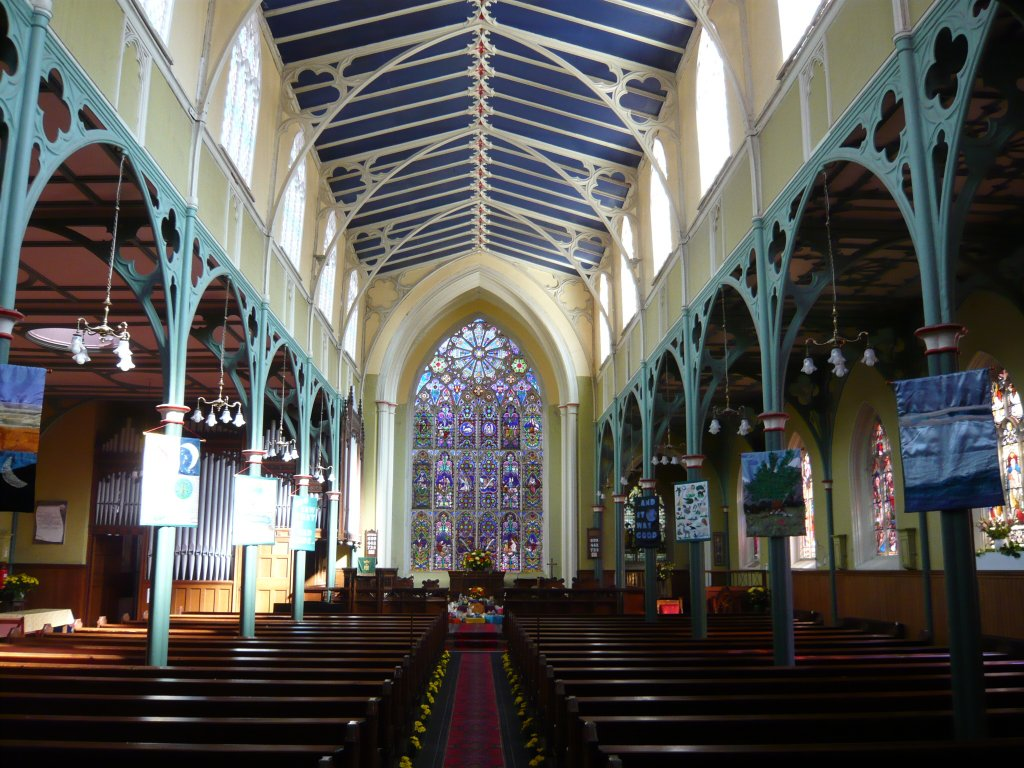
Interior of St Michael's Church, Aigburth showing Cragg's ironwork

The Iron Church or The Cast Iron Church is any of the three churches built in Liverpool in the early 19th century by John Cragg, who ran the Mersey Iron Foundry, and architect Thomas Rickman. The churches incorporated substantial cast iron elements into their structure and decoration. Two of these churches are still in existence and are active Anglican parish churches. These are St George's Church, Everton, and St Michael's Church, Aigburth. The third church, now demolished, was St Philip's in Hardman Street.

== History ==
The first building in England to use iron as a structural material was St Anne's Church, Liverpool. It had cast iron columns and was built between 1770 and 1772. An iron-frame mill built was built in Derby in 1792-93 and Wesleyan Chapel in Bilston, Staffordshire, had a cast iron pulpit, columns and window frames produced by John Wilkinson.

This trend was continued by John Cragg, owner of Mersey Iron Foundry, and Thomas Rickman, an architect, who built three churches primarily out of iron. Rickman made the designs for St George's Church, Everton, which was built between 1813 and 1814, and Cradd made the entire interior out of iron. St George's Church was consecrated on the 30th of October 1814. St Michael's Church, Aigburth, built between 1813 and 1815 and St Philip's Church, Hardman Street, built in 1816, both also have substantial cast iron elements in their structure and decoration. St Michael's Church was consecrated by the Bishop of Chester in 1815.

St Philip's in Hardman Street is now demolished. In 2015, the Bishop of Liverpool attended a service celebrating the St Michael's Church's 200th anniversary.

== See also ==
- Tin tabernacle
- Bulgarian Iron Church
