= Grade I listed buildings in Merseyside =

Merseyside shown in England

There are over 9,000 Grade I listed buildings in England. This page is a list of these buildings in the county of Merseyside.

== Knowsley ==
Name	Location	Type	Completed (Note: The date given is the date used by Historic England as significant for the initial building or that of an important part in the structure's description.)	Date designated	Grid ref. (Note: Sometimes known as OSGB36, the grid reference is based on the British national grid reference system used by the Ordnance Survey.) Geo-coordinates	Entry number (Note: The "List Entry Number" is a unique number assigned to each listed building and scheduled monument by Historic England.)	Image
Church of St Mary	Prescot	Church	14th century	19 March 1951	SJ4653192704; 53°25′42″N 2°48′22″W	1199139	Church of St Mary More images

== Liverpool ==
Name	Location	Type	Completed	Date designated	Grid ref. Geo-coordinates	Entry number	Image
Albert Dock Traffic Office	Albert Dock	Office	1846–47	28 June 1952	SJ3413789864; 53°24′05″N 2°59′31″W	1356264	Albert Dock Traffic Office More images
All Saints' Church	Childwall	Church	14th century	28 June 1952	SJ4147689079; 53°23′43″N 2°52′54″W	1356299	All Saints' Church More images
Anglican Cathedral Church of Christ	Liverpool	Anglican Cathedral	1904	28 June 1952	SJ3538289397; 53°23′51″N 2°58′24″W	1361681	Anglican Cathedral Church of Christ More images
Bank of England Building	Liverpool	Bank (financial)	1845–48	28 June 1952	SJ3426290392; 53°24′22″N 2°59′25″W	1205904	Bank of England Building More images
Bluecoat Chambers	Liverpool	Office	1717	28 June 1952	SJ3468590149; 53°24′15″N 2°59′02″W	1292322	Bluecoat Chambers More images
Church of All Hallows	Allerton	Church	1872–76	28 June 1952	SJ3998487473; 53°22′50″N 2°54′13″W	1068414	Church of All Hallows More images
Church of St. Agnes and St. Pancras	Toxteth	Church	1883–85	14 March 1975	SJ3759188494; 53°23′22″N 2°56′24″W	1359871	Church of St. Agnes and St. Pancras More images
Church of St Clare	Liverpool	Church	1888–90	28 June 1952	SJ3779688649; 53°23′28″N 2°56′13″W	1205333	Church of St Clare More images
Church of St George	Liverpool	Church	1812–14	12 July 1966	SJ3554492489; 53°25′31″N 2°58′17″W	1075216	Church of St George More images
Church of St John the Baptist	Liverpool	Church	1868–70	28 June 1952	SJ3829792406; 53°25′29″N 2°55′48″W	1063778	Church of St John the Baptist More images
The Oratory	Liverpool	Hall	1829	28 June 1952	SJ3538689543; 53°23′55″N 2°58′24″W	1063282	The Oratory More images
Oriel Chambers	Liverpool	Office	1864	12 July 1966	SJ3406790429; 53°24′24″N 2°59′36″W	1291943	Oriel Chambers More images
Philharmonic Hotel	Liverpool	Public House	1898	12 July 1966	SJ3556989883; 53°24′07″N 2°58′14″W	1207638	Philharmonic Hotel More images
Princes Road Synagogue	Liverpool	Synagogue	Built 1872–74	14 March 1975	SJ3592689133; 53°23′42″N 2°57′54″W	1072969	Princes Road Synagogue More images
Railings, gates and gate piers Old Bluecoat School	Liverpool	Gate	c. 1717	14 March 1975	SJ3469090180; 53°24′16″N 2°59′02″W	1073446	Railings, gates and gate piers Old Bluecoat School More images
Royal Liver Building, iron railings and stone piers surrounding Royal Liver Building	George's Pier Head	Office	1908–10	12 July 1966	SJ3388090329; 53°24′20″N 2°59′46″W	1356370	Royal Liver Building, iron railings and stone piers surrounding Royal Liver Building More images
Speke Hall	Liverpool	House	1540–60	28 June 1952	SJ4186582568; 53°20′13″N 2°52′28″W	1359837	Speke Hall More images
St George's Hall	Liverpool	Concert Hall	1841–45	28 June 1952	SJ3493190656; 53°24′31″N 2°58′49″W	1361677	St George's Hall More images
St Michael's Church	Aigburth	Church	1814	28 June 1952	SJ3690887058; 53°22′36″N 2°56′59″W	1209945	St Michael's Church More images
Town Hall	Liverpool	Town Hall	1749–54	28 June 1952	SJ3417590496; 53°24′26″N 2°59′30″W	1360219	Town Hall More images
Toxteth Unitarian Chapel	Liverpool	Chapel	Post 1618	28 June 1952	SJ3637787590; 53°22′53″N 2°57′29″W	1072991	Toxteth Unitarian Chapel More images
Unitarian Chapel	Liverpool	Chapel	1898	14 March 1975	SJ3771388521; 53°23′23″N 2°56′17″W	1218227	Unitarian Chapel More images
Unitarian Church Hall	Liverpool	Church Hall	1901	14 March 1975	SJ3773988504; 53°23′23″N 2°56′16″W	1359872	Unitarian Church Hall More images
Warehouse A	Albert Dock	Warehouse	1841–45	28 June 1952	SJ3419789710; 53°24′00″N 2°59′28″W	1205175	Warehouse A More images
Warehouses B and C	Albert Dock	Warehouses	1841–45	28 June 1952	SJ3405689591; 53°23′56″N 2°59′36″W	1068409	Warehouses B and C More images
Warehouse D	Albert Dock	Warehouse (now Museum)	1841–45	28 June 1952	SJ3407989840; 53°24′04″N 2°59′35″W	1280847	Warehouse D More images
Warehouse E	Albert Dock	Apartment	1985	28 June 1952	SJ3415389833; 53°24′04″N 2°59′31″W	1068410	Warehouse E More images
Woolton Hall	Liverpool	House	1704	28 June 1982	SJ4254886416; 53°22′17″N 2°51′54″W	1217943	Woolton Hall More images

== Sefton ==
Name	Location	Type	Completed	Date designated	Grid ref. Geo-coordinates	Entry number	Image
Church of St Helen	Sefton	Church	Early 14th century	11 October 1968	SD3568301295; 53°30′16″N 2°58′16″W	1075852	Church of St Helen More images
Church of St Monica	Bootle	Church	1936	19 March 1981	SJ3503495685; 53°27′14″N 2°58′47″W	1283647	Church of St Monica More images

== St. Helens ==
Name	Location	Type	Completed	Date designated	Grid ref. Geo-coordinates	Entry number	Image
Sankey Viaduct over Sankey Brook (that part in St Helens District)	Newton-le-Willows, St Helens	Railway Viaduct	1830	3 February 1966	SJ5688294719; 53°26′51″N 2°39′02″W	1075927	Sankey Viaduct over Sankey Brook (that part in St Helens District) More images

== Wirral ==
Name	Location	Type	Completed	Date designated	Grid ref. Geo-coordinates	Entry number	Image
Brimstage Hall and Tower	Brimstage	House	c. 1398	27 December 1962	SJ3042482699; 53°20′12″N 3°02′47″W	1183702	Brimstage Hall and Tower More images
Church of St. Andrew	Lower Bebington	Church	12th century	27 December 1962	SJ3330183908; 53°20′52″N 3°00′12″W	1075462	Church of St. Andrew More images
Numbers 1 to 18 (consecutive), Hamilton Square including railings to front	Birkenhead	Model Dwelling	c. 1825	29 July 1950	SJ3258789088; 53°23′39″N 3°00′55″W	1201580	Numbers 1 to 18 (consecutive), Hamilton Square including railings to front More images
Numbers 19 to 34 (consecutive), Hamilton Square - with railings to front	Birkenhead	Model Dwelling	1839–44	29 July 1950	SJ3245089045; 53°23′38″N 3°01′02″W	1292180	Numbers 19 to 34 (consecutive), Hamilton Square - with railings to front More images
Numbers 35 to 51 (consecutive), Hamilton Square - with railings to front	Birkenhead	Model Dwelling	1839–44	29 July 1950	SJ3250088927; 53°23′34″N 3°00′59″W	1292148	Numbers 35 to 51 (consecutive), Hamilton Square - with railings to front More images
Numbers 52 to 57 (consecutive), Hamilton Square - with railings to front	Birkenhead	Model Dwelling	c. 1844	29 July 1950	SJ3260488927; 53°23′34″N 3°00′54″W	1282616	Numbers 52 to 57 (consecutive), Hamilton Square - with railings to front More images
Numbers 58 to 63 (consecutive), Hamilton Square - with railings to front, flanking wall and gate piers to north-east	Birkenhead	Model Dwelling	c. 1825	29 July 1950	SJ3268189036; 53°23′38″N 3°00′50″W	1218048	Numbers 58 to 63 (consecutive), Hamilton Square - with railings to front, flanking wall and gate piers to north-east More images
Remains of Birkenhead Priory	Birkenhead	Church	1150–1400	29 July 1950	SJ3280788542; 53°23′22″N 3°00′42″W	1201757	Remains of Birkenhead Priory More images
Port Sunlight War Memorial	Port Sunlight	War memorial	1919–21	28 October 2014	SJ3367484480; 53°21′11″N 2°59′52″W	1343491	Port Sunlight War Memorial More images

== See also ==
- Grade II* listed buildings in Merseyside
