= Iron church =

The term iron church may refer to a church or chapel made from corrugated iron:

- Tin tabernacle

or it may refer to one of three churches in Liverpool, England, containing much cast iron which are referred to as:

- The Iron Church

or to the Bulgarian St. Stephen Church in Istanbul, often called the Iron Church.

- In North America, it may also be a humorous euphemism for a gym.
