= St Michael's Hamlet =

Area of Liverpool, England

Coordinates: 53.376°N 2.950°W

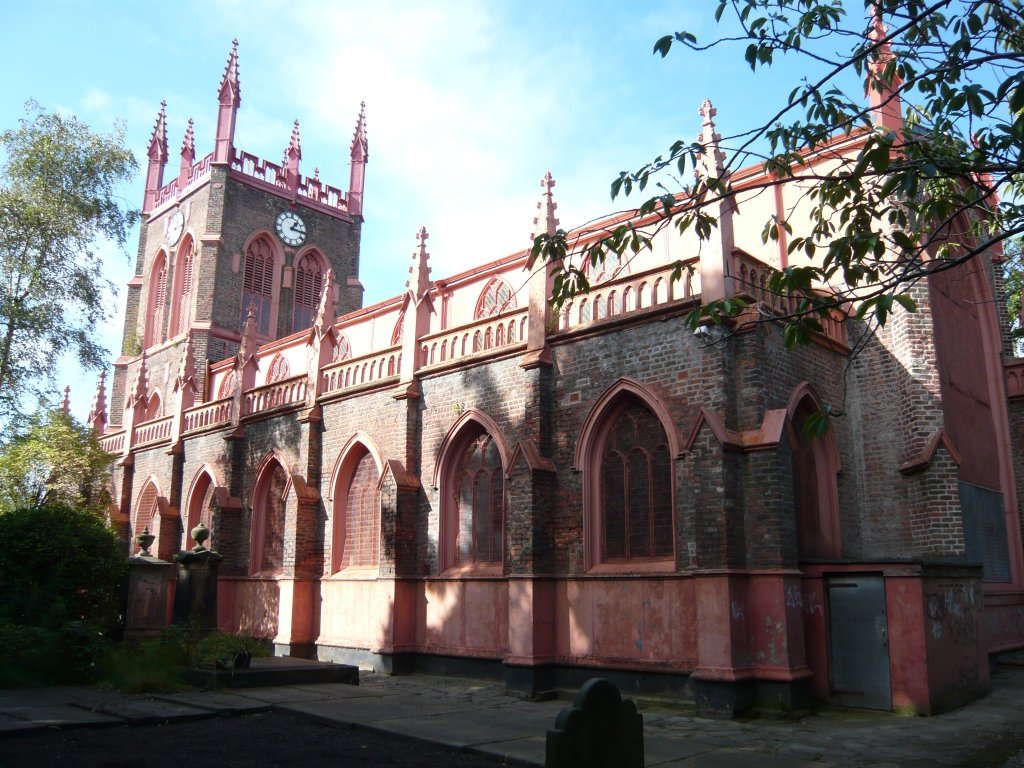
- St Michael's Church

- Location within Merseyside
- OS grid reference: SJ368870
- Metropolitan borough: Liverpool
- Metropolitan county: Merseyside
- Region: North West
- Country: England
- Sovereign state: United Kingdom
- Post town: LIVERPOOL
- Postcode district: L17
- Dialling code: 0151
- Police: Merseyside
- Fire: Merseyside
- Ambulance: North West
- UK Parliament: Liverpool Riverside

St Michael's Hamlet, also known as St Michael-in-the-Hamlet or simply St Michael's, is a suburb of Liverpool, Merseyside, England and a Liverpool City Council Ward. It is located to the south of the city, bordered by Dingle, Aigburth and Mossley Hill.

== History ==
During the Georgian and Victoria era, St Michael's was a very wealthy parish, reflecting the wealth of the city of Liverpool. Its parish church, St Michael's, is of a cast-iron construction by John Cragg, who was also responsible for St George's and St Philip's churches in the city.

== Description ==
It is a residential area to the west of Aigburth Road, near Sefton Park. Housing is a mix of semi-detached and terraced houses, with a few detached developments near the waterfront. St Michaels is part of Aigburth, an adjacent suburb which is larger. St Michael's Hamlet was designated a conservation area on 12 December 1968.

== Government ==
The elected councillor for St Michael's is Tom Crone (Green Party). The area is in the Liverpool Wavertree parliamentary constituency.

== Transport ==
The area is served by St Michaels railway station on Merseyrail's Northern Line. Regular trains depart for Liverpool city centre, Southport and Hunts Cross. Regular buses run along Aigburth Road from Liverpool city centre, including services to Liverpool John Lennon Airport.
