= John Cragg =

English ironmaster

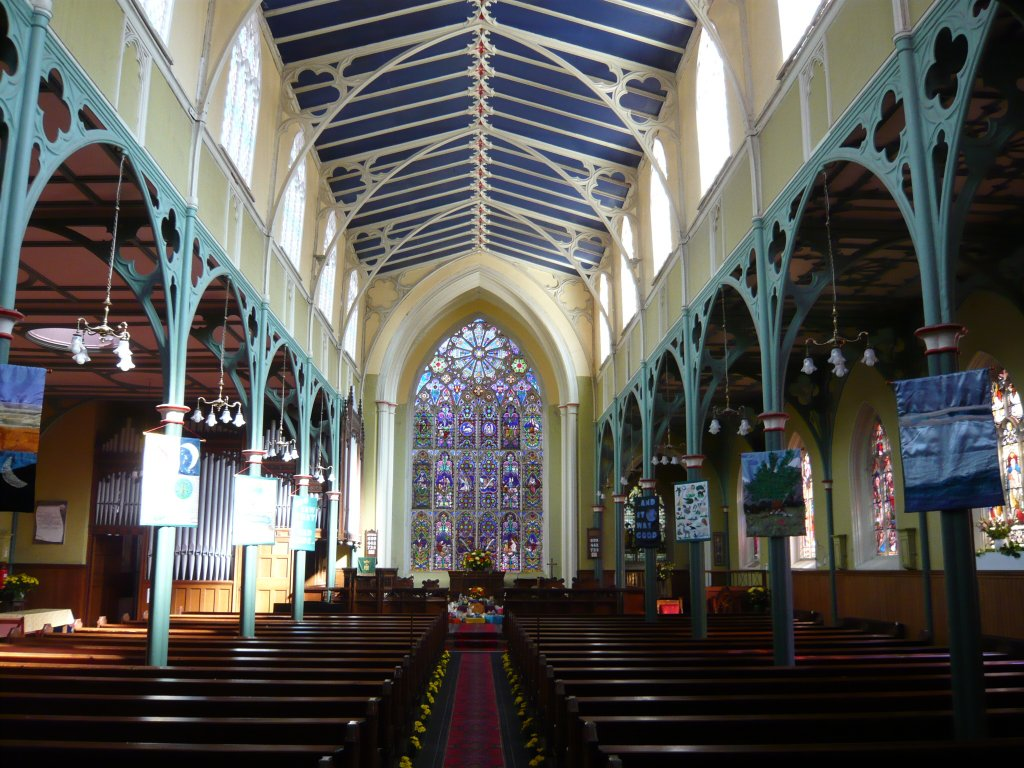
Interior of St Michael's Church, Aigburth showing Cragg's ironwork

John Cragg (1767 – 17 July 1854) was an English ironmaster who ran a foundry in Liverpool, Merseyside, England. Cragg was an enthusiast in the use of prefabricated ironwork in the structure of buildings, and in the early 19th century became interested in building churches.

He was born in Warrington (then in the historic county of Lancashire, now in the ceremonial county of Cheshire). His business was the Merseyside Iron Foundry, which was located in Tithebarn Street, Liverpool. He had been discussing building a church in Toxteth Park, Liverpool, and in 1809 plans had been drawn up for this by J. M. Gandy. This church was never built, but in 1812 Cragg met Thomas Rickman, and together they designed the three churches in Liverpool incorporating Cragg's cast iron elements. The first of these was St George's Church, Everton (1813–14). The exterior of this church is largely in stone, but the framework of its interior, including the galleries, and the window tracery are in cast iron. The ceilings consist of slate slabs supported by cast iron rafters, which are decorated with cast iron tracery. The second church resulting from this collaboration was St Michael's Church, Aigburth (1813–15), Here, in addition to the cast iron framework of the interior, and the window tracery, the parapets, battlements, pinnacles, hoodmoulds, the dado, and other details are also in cast iron. The area around the church, known as St Michael's Hamlet contains five villas containing many cast iron features. The third cast iron church was St Philip's Church (1815–16) in Hardman Street, Liverpool, which was closed in 1882 and demolished. Some cast iron fragments have been incorporated in the fabric of the block of buildings now occupying the site of the churchyard. Cragg died on 17 July 1854, aged 87, and was buried in St James Cemetery, Liverpool.

== See also ==
- The Iron Church
