= St Clare's Church, Liverpool =

Church of St Clare, Liverpool
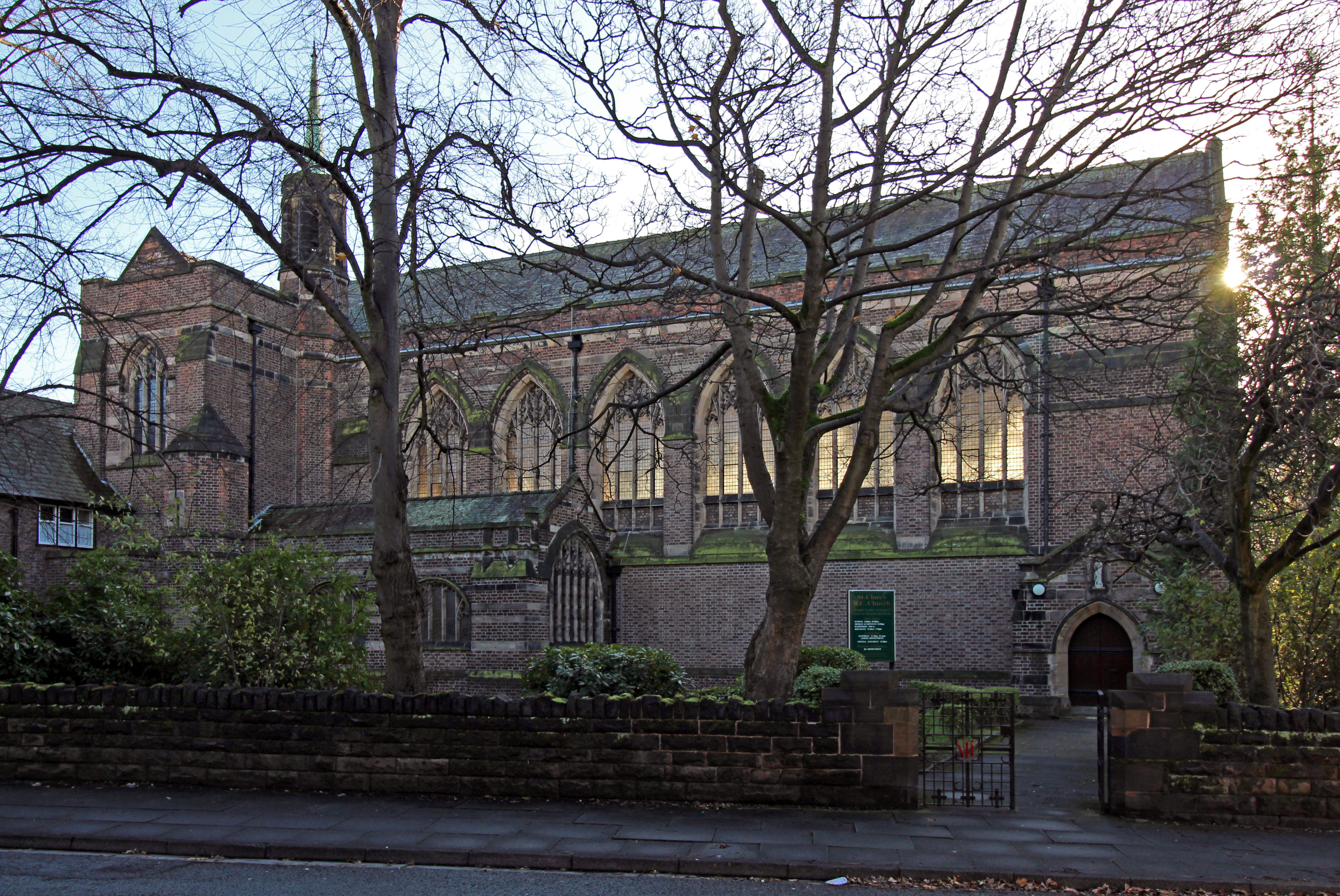
- Church of St Clare, Liverpool
- 53.3910°N 2.9367°W
- OS grid reference: SJ 378 886
- Location: Liverpool, Merseyside
- Country: England
- Denomination: Roman Catholic
- Website: https://sschliverpool.org.uk/

History
- Status: Parish church
- Founder(s): Francis and James Reynolds
- Consecrated: 1890

Architecture
- Functional status: Active
- Heritage designation: Grade I
- Designated: 28 June 1952
- Architect: Leonard Stokes
- Architectural type: Church
- Style: Gothic Revival
- Groundbreaking: May 1888
- Completed: June 1890
- Construction cost: £7,834

Specifications
- Capacity: c. 600

The Church of St Clare is on the corner of Arundel Avenue and York Avenue in the Sefton Park area of Liverpool, Merseyside, England. It is recorded in the National Heritage List for England as a designated Grade I listed building, and is an active Roman Catholic parish church in the Archdiocese of Liverpool and the Pastoral Area of Liverpool South. It is the only Grade I listed Roman Catholic church in the Archdiocese of Liverpool. Sharples and Pollard consider it to be "one of the most imaginative churches of its date in the country".

== History ==
The church was built in 1888–90 and paid for by the brothers Francis and James Reynolds, who were cotton brokers, at a cost of £7,834 (equivalent to £870,000 in 2025). The architect was Leonard Stokes, the godson of Francis Reynolds. It is considered to be Stokes' "first really outstanding ecclesiastical design". The foundation stone was laid on 25 March 1889, the church was consecrated on 3 June 1890 and opened for worship on 20 July of that year. The contractors for the building were Morrison and Sons of Wavertree.

== Architecture ==
=== Exterior ===
The church is built in buff-coloured brick with Storeton stone bands and dressings, and is in Gothic style. Its roof is of slate. The plan of the church consists of a single vessel with a small north transept, long and low north and south chapels at the east end, and two porches, one at either side of the west end. Along the south wall are confessionals under a lean-to roof. The west face is simple with a large seven-light window. The porches are gabled; over the north doorway is a niche containing a statue of St Clare and in the corresponding position in the south porch is a statue of St Francis. The south chapel, the Sacred Heart Chapel, has its own saddleback roof and four round-headed five-light windows. The north chapel is the Lady Chapel and has a large west window of seven lights. The east face of the church is also simple and contains a short wide nine-light window, the outer two lights on each side being blind. The transept is gabled with one three-light window and a stair turret with a conical roof which gives access to the organ loft. In the angle of the nave and transept is a small octagonal turret with copper flèche.

=== Interior ===
Inside the church are internal buttresses which are pierced to form narrow passage aisles. The buttresses are linked by arches which support balconies. The interior of the church has ten bays with a wagon roof. The high altar dating from 1890 consists of a large triptych which contains paintings and relief sculptures by Robert Anning Bell and George Frampton. The stone pulpit was designed by Stokes and consists of four sides of a hexagon with openwork tracery. The font is shaped like a chalice and is made of alabaster with a copper cover. The marble altar rails, erected in 1933, stretch across the width of the nave and the chapels. Around the church the Stations of the Cross are oil paintings which were installed in 1892 at a cost of £300. In the chapels are statues of religious subjects by Mayer and Company of Munich. The oldest stained glass in the church is in the Sacred Heart Chapel, the Sacred Heart window, which was installed in 1906. The Catherine of Siena window in the chapel was erected in 1912. The stained glass in the east window of the church, depicting the Crucifixion, was installed in 1908. The organ loft is situated above the Lady Chapel. The organ was built in 1892 by Steele & Keay of Burslem and was renovated in 1920 by Henry Willis & Sons.

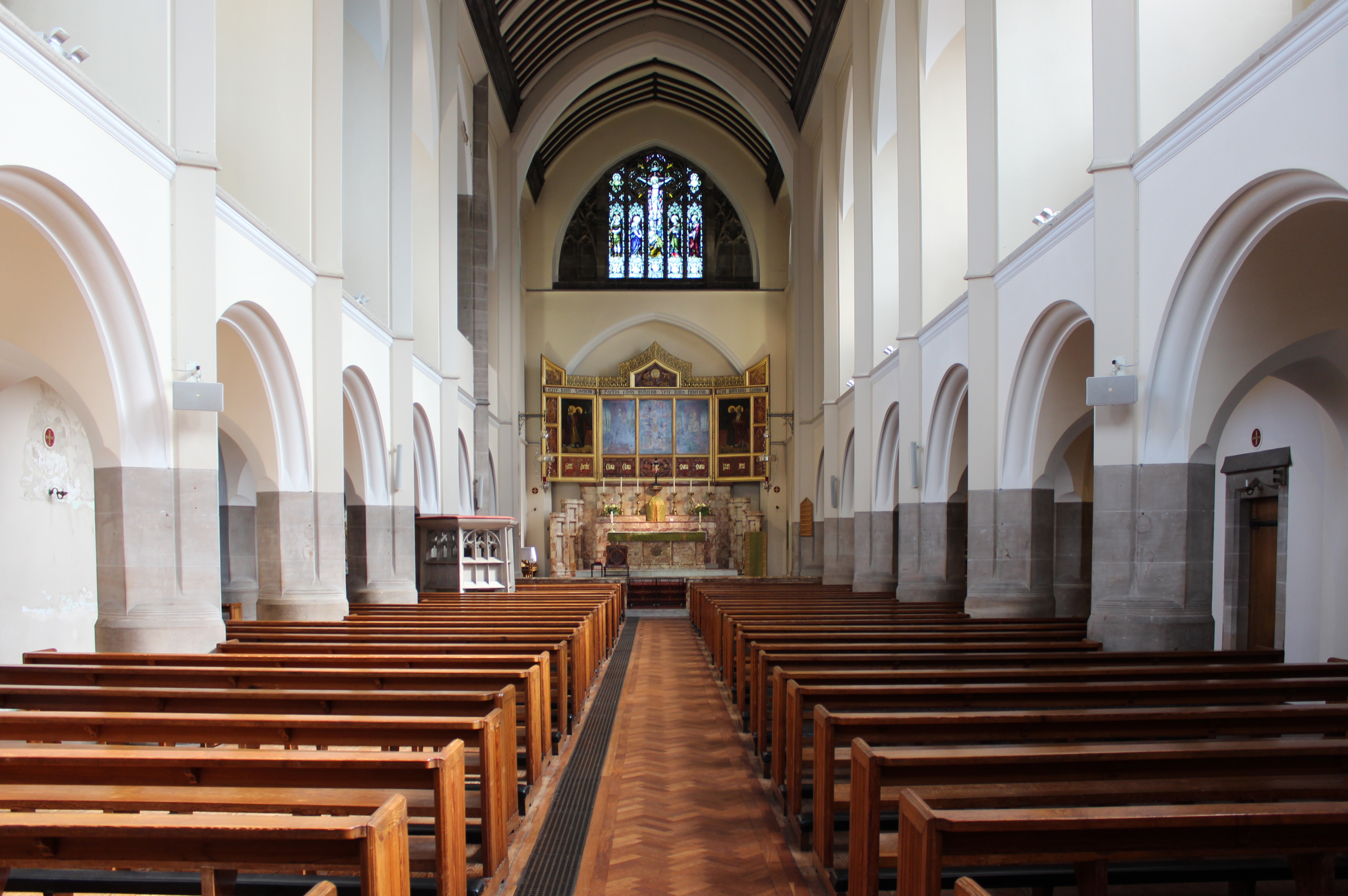
Nave

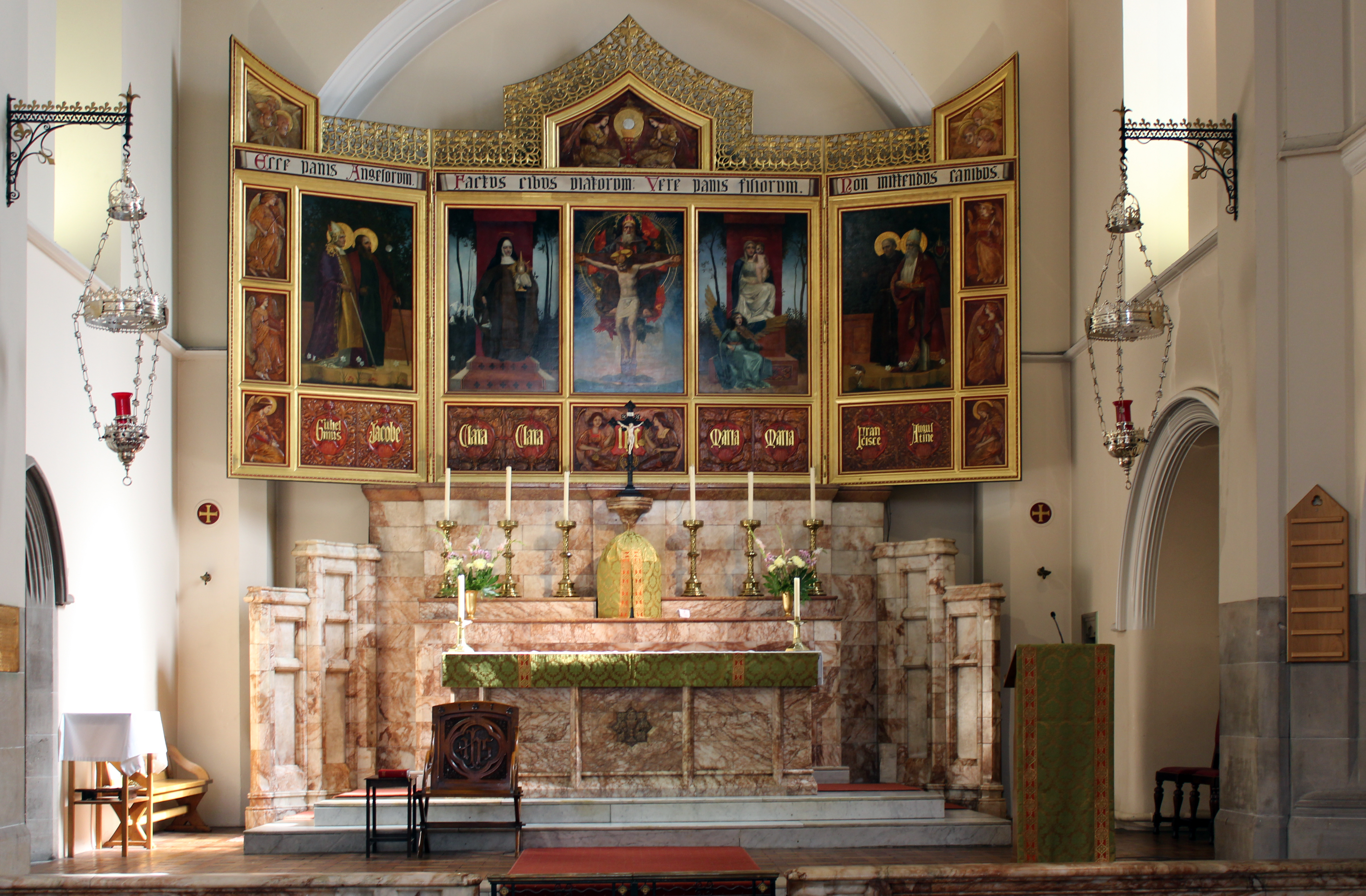
Altar

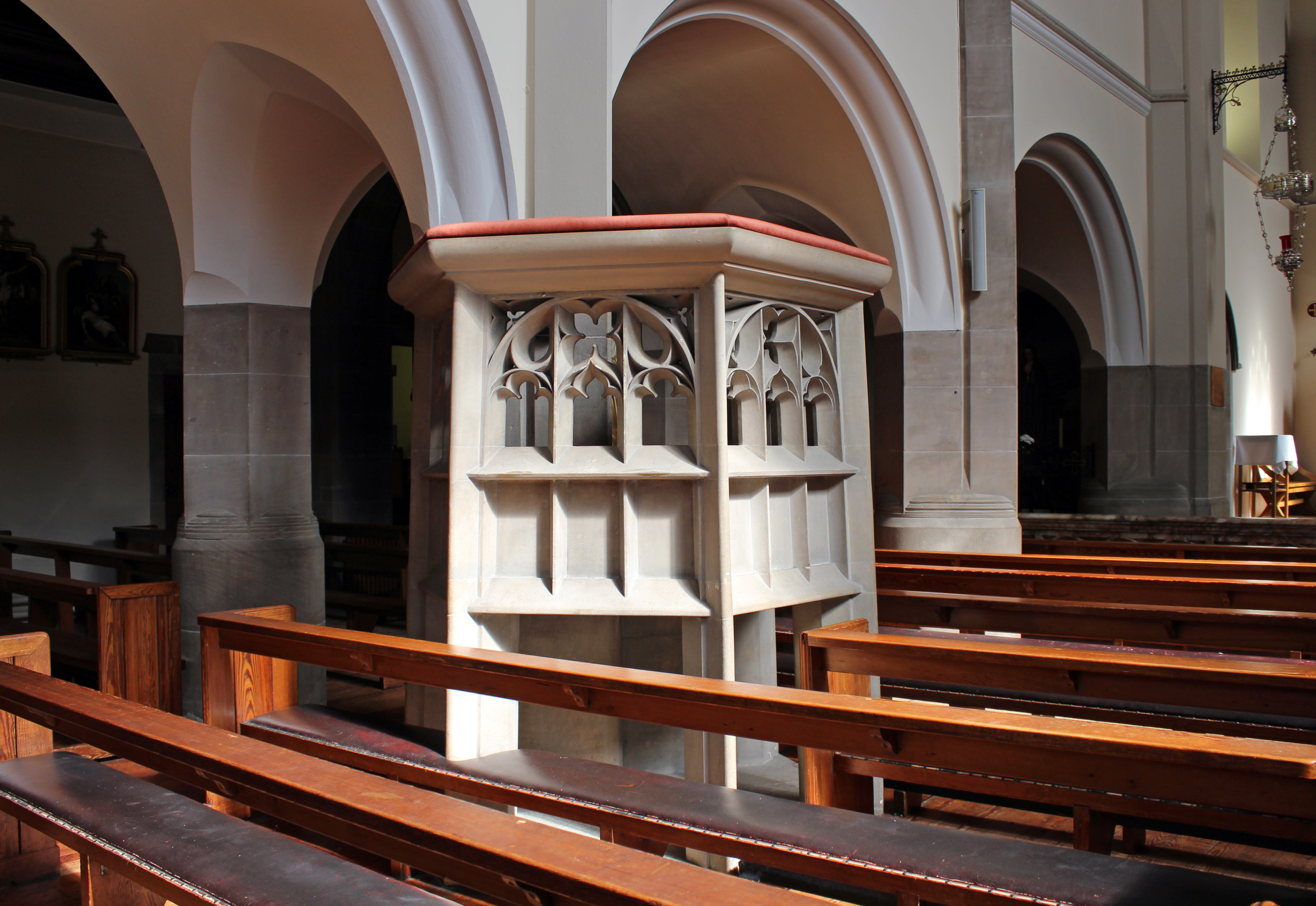
Pulpit

== Presbytery ==
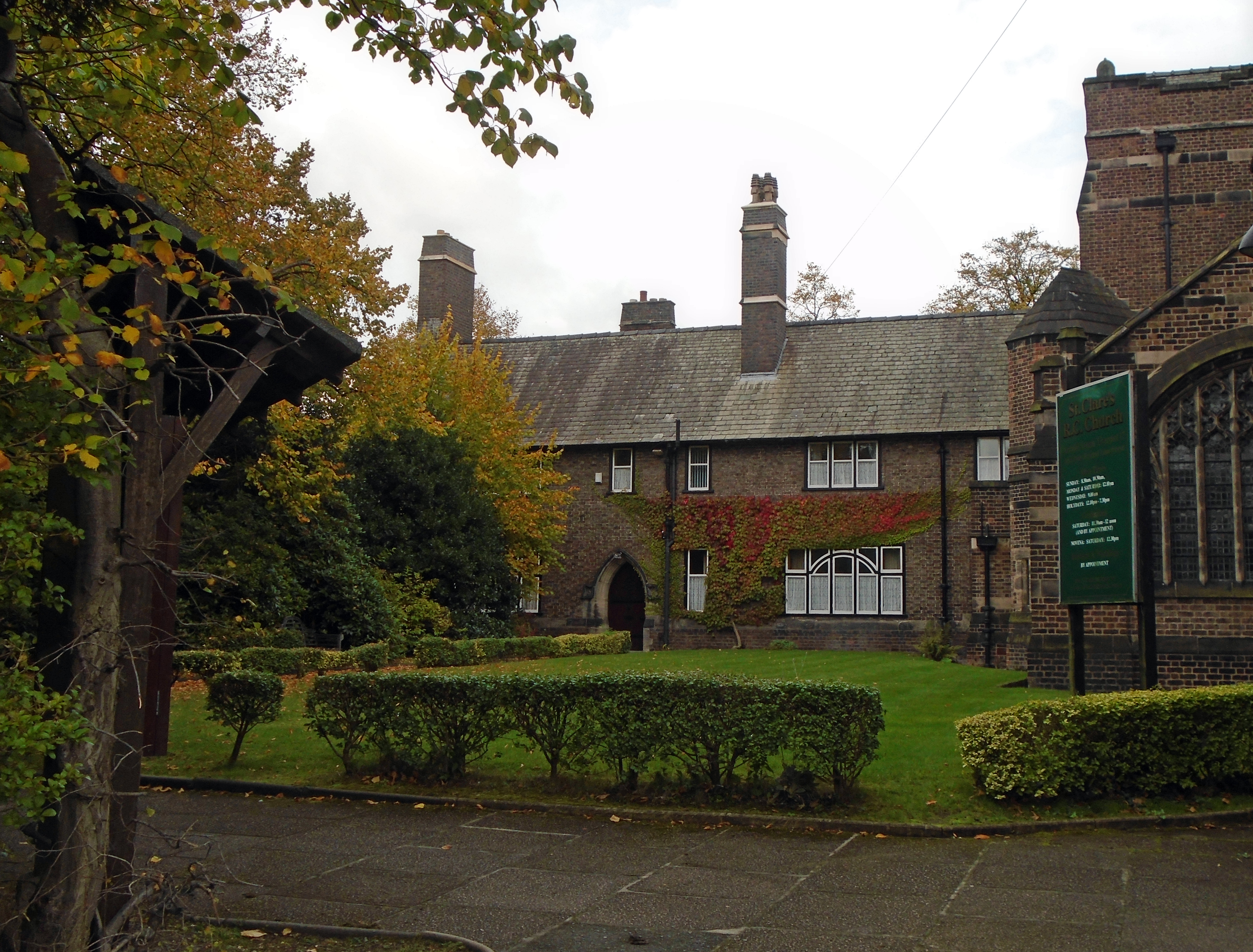
Presbytery from the west

The two-storey presbytery adjoining the church was also designed by Stokes and it is a Grade II listed building. It is built in brick with a slate roof and runs from the north of the chancel. Sharples and Pollard consider that the curved hoodmoulds over the door anticipate the Art Nouveau style.

== See also ==
- Grade I listed buildings in Merseyside
- Grade I listed churches in Merseyside
