= Albert Dock Traffic Office =

Building in Liverpool, Merseyside, England

Coordinates: 53.4015°N 2.9921°W

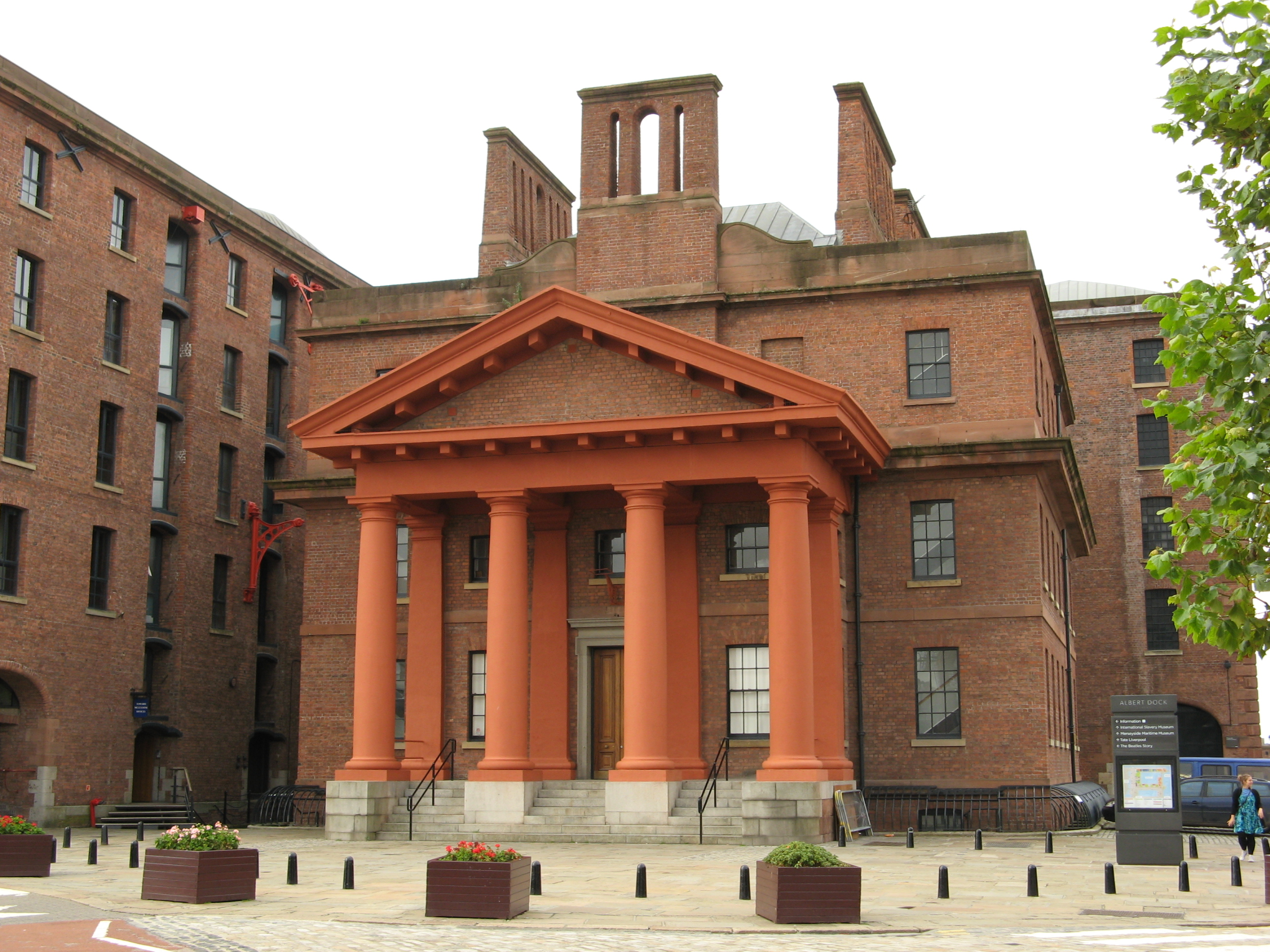
- Interactive map of the Albert Dock Traffic Office area
- Alternative names: Dr Martin Luther King Jr Building

General information
- Location: Liverpool, England
- Completed: 1847

Design and construction
- Architects: Philip Hardwick; Jesse Hartley

The Albert Dock Traffic Office, officially the Dr Martin Luther King Jr Building, is a 19th-century Grade I listed building located in Liverpool, England. It is one of a series of buildings that make up the Royal Albert Dock. The building was formerly occupied by Granada Television, and is now owned by National Museums Liverpool and houses part of the International Slavery Museum.

== History ==
Completed in 1847 by architect Philip Hardwick, the building was initially designed for use within the then newly built Albert Dock which had opened just a year prior. Failing profitability of the dock resulted in its closure post World War Two however a regeneration scheme during the 1980s saw the complex refurbished and occupied by Granada Television. After Granada relocated to neighbouring Manchester the building used briefly used by television show This Morning before buying sold on as part of a cost-cutting measure.

In 2008 the building was sold to the International Slavery Museum and now display some of the museum's exhibitions. The building was renamed after Martin Luther King Jr. in 2012 during a visit to Liverpool by his son, Martin Luther King III.

== Architecture ==
Set across three stories; the third of which added a year after its completion, the building is of red brick with 5 x 7 bay windows. The buildings façade features a Tuscan portico and frieze with four columns constructed of cast iron.
