= Hardman Street =

Street in Liverpool, England

Coordinates: 53.40179°N 2.97249°W

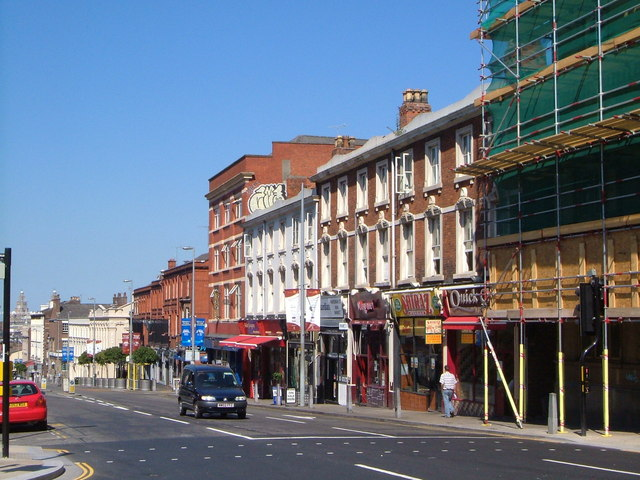
Hardman Street.

Hardman Street is a major street in Liverpool, England. It forms part of the A5039 and joins Leece Street to the west and Myrtle Street to the west. It lies within the postal district L1 in Liverpool city centre. It is named after the Hardman family of Allerton Hall.

The Philharmonic Dining Rooms is situated on the junction of Hope Street and Hardman Street, diagonally opposite the Liverpool Philharmonic Hall. Hardman Street and Hope Street form one of the city's most popular nightlife spots, particularly with students as both the Liverpool Students' Union and Liverpool Guild of Students are located nearby. Nightclubs and bars in the area include: The Magnet, Hannah's Bar, The Piano Bar, The Hope and Anchor, The Flute, Bumper, Ye Cracke, Fly In The Loaf, The Pilgrim, The Casa, The Everyman Bar and Bistro, The Belvedere and The Grapes
