= St Michael's Church, Aigburth =

Coordinates: 53.3766°N 2.9499°W

- St Michael-in-the-Hamlet Church, Aigburth
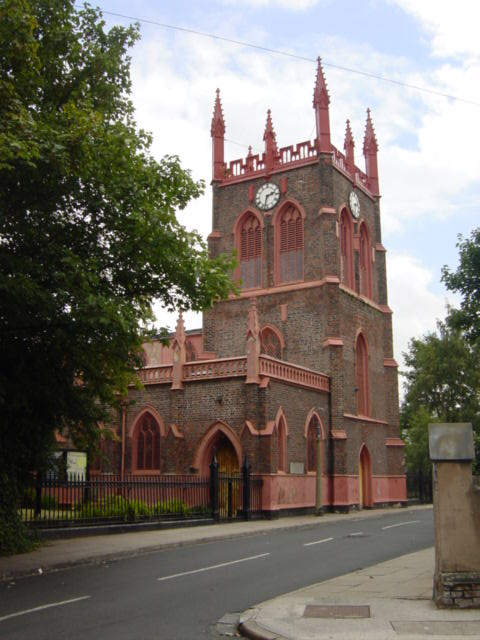
- St Michael's Church, Aigburth

- Location in Merseyside
- OS grid reference: SJ 369,870
- Location: St Michael's Hamlet, Liverpool
- Country: England
- Denomination: Anglican
- Churchmanship: Open Evangelical
- Website: St Michael in the Hamlet

History
- Status: Parish church
- Dedication: St Michael
- Consecrated: 21 June 1815

Architecture
- Functional status: Active
- Heritage designation: Grade I
- Designated: 28 June 1952
- Architect(s): Thomas Rickman; W. & G. Audsley
- Architectural type: Church
- Style: Gothic Revival
- Groundbreaking: December 1813
- Completed: 1900
- Construction cost: £7,865

Specifications
- Materials: Brick with cast iron components Slate roof

Administration
- Province: York
- Diocese: Liverpool
- Archdeaconry: Liverpool
- Deanery: Toxteth and Wavertree
- Parish: St. Michael-in-the-Hamlet with St. Andrew, Toxteth Park

Clergy
- Vicar: Revd Keith Hitchman

St Michael's Church, also known as St Michael-in-the-Hamlet Church, is in St. Michael's Church Road, St Michael's Hamlet, Liverpool, Merseyside, England. It is recorded in the National Heritage List for England as a designated Grade I listed building. The church contains much cast iron in its structure, and its citation in the National Heritage List for England states it has "one of the earliest and most thorough uses of industrial materials in a major building". It is an active Anglican parish church in the diocese of Liverpool, the archdeaconry of Liverpool, and the deanery of Toxteth and Wavertree. Its benefice is united with those of Christ Church, Toxteth Park, and St Andrew, Liverpool.

== History ==
The church was built between 1813 and 1815 as a chapel of ease to St Mary's Church, Walton. The church was built by John Cragg, the owner of the Mersey Iron Foundry, Tithebarn Street, Liverpool. Cragg bought the land from the Earl of Sefton, and built the church at his own expense, its final cost being £7,865 (equivalent to £610,000 in 2025). Cragg was a keen churchman and was always looking for new ways to use cast iron. He had already starting building St George's Church, Everton, using cast iron in its structure. and he planned to use more of it in St Michael's. Here it was used in the construction of the walls and for the pinnacles. The cast iron in the walls formed a skeleton, the base of which was filled with slate, and the remainder with brick. The brick was stuccoed. Internally he used it for the columns, for the tracery of the ceiling, and for mouldings. Cragg worked with the architect Thomas Rickman on the design of both churches, although the relationship between the two was not always happy. The church was consecrated by the Bishop of Chester (George Henry Law) on 21 June 1815.

By the late 1860s the structure of the building had deteriorated so much that it was in danger of demolition. However one of the churchwardens, Colonel Thomas Wilson organised a restoration of the church, the architects being W. and G. Audsley. The box pews were removed and replaced with benches providing a centre aisle as well as the two side aisles, the floor was relaid, and a new heating system was installed. Further improvements were made in the following years. In July 1898 St Michael's became a parish in its own right. By this time the building was not large enough for its congregation, and in 1897 a faculty had been obtained to extend the church. The north wall was removed and replaced further out, thereby increasing the width of the church. A new porch was built, a vestry was created in the former porch, and access to the west gallery was moved from the north to the south side. The cost for this was £2,950 (equivalent to £330,000 in 2025), which was raised by the parishioners.

In 1902 the organ was moved from the west gallery to a position north of the chancel. Following the First World War, the money collected to celebrate the church's centenary in 1915 was used instead was used for improvements to the church. It was used to redecorate the interior, for the provision of a clock in the tower, and for a memorial window in the porch. In 1957 the Jubilee Chapel was created at the east end of the south aisle to commemorate the diamond jubilee of the Mothers' Union. A further renovation took place in 1984 when the pipe organ, that had been damaged by water, was replaced with an electronic organ. The oak reredos was removed from the sanctuary and the lower tier of stained glass was replaced in the east window. The gallery was converted into a choir vestry with a glass screen overlooking the interior of the church. Its cost was £8,000.

== Structure ==
The church is built in brick with many cast iron components; these include the parapets, battlements and pinnacles. The roofs are of slate slabs in a cast-iron framework. The lower (dado) level of the external wall is clad in slate panels finished with iron, which were originally sanded and painted with limewash mixed with animal blood to resemble Woolton sandstone. The church's plan consists of a six-bay nave with clerestory, north and south aisles (the north aisle being wider than the south), a west tower, and a short chancel with a vestry to the north and a chapel to the south. The aisles, clerestory and tower have three-light windows with Perpendicular tracery. The tower also has paired three-light bell-openings, diagonal buttresses, an arcaded, embattled parapet and pinnacles. Inside is a six-bay arcade with cast iron columns. The windows are also made from cast iron. An organ occupies the east bay of the north aisle and there is a west gallery.

== Fittings and furnishings ==
The stained glass in the east window is in early Gothic Revival style. The east window in the chapel dates from 1916 and is by Shrigley and Hunt. In the porch is a First World War memorial window with glass by H. Gustave Hiller. The font is in marble. In the church is a marble tablet to the memory of the astronomer Jeremiah Horrox who was born nearby.

== Gallery ==
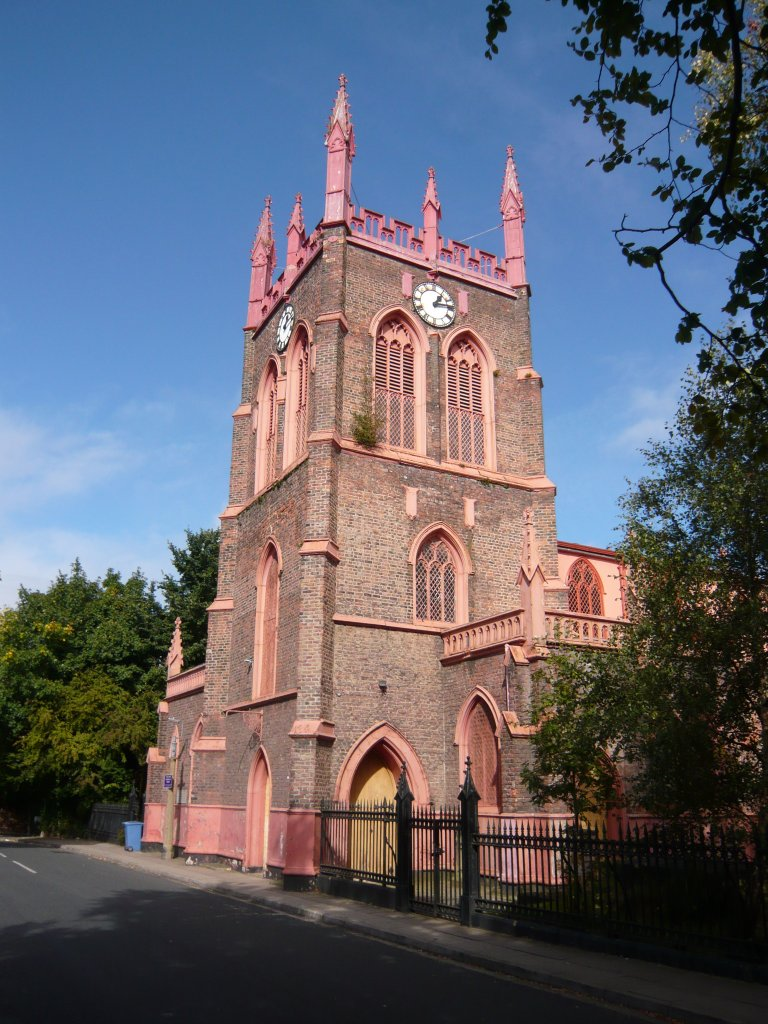
From the South West

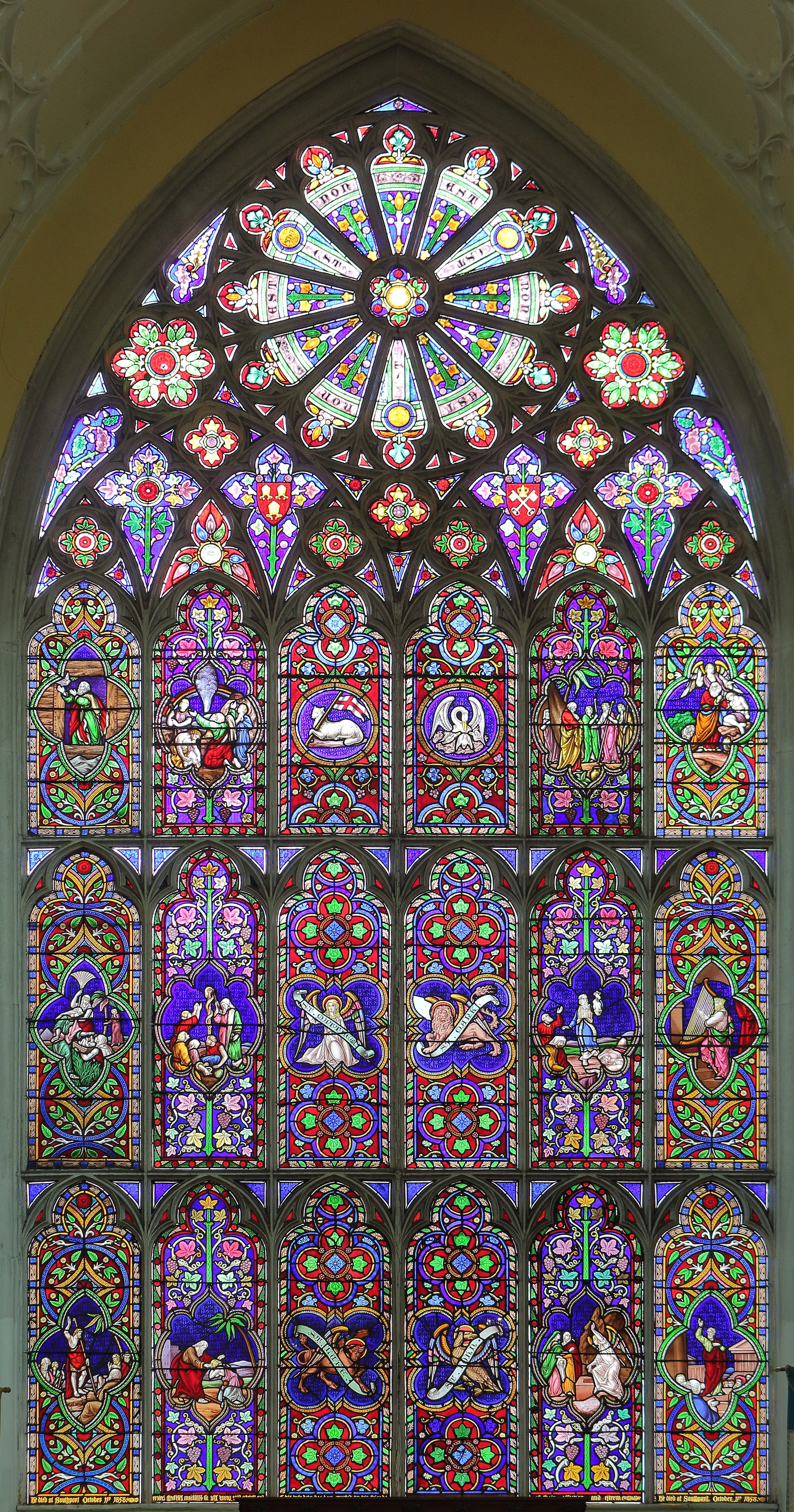
East Window

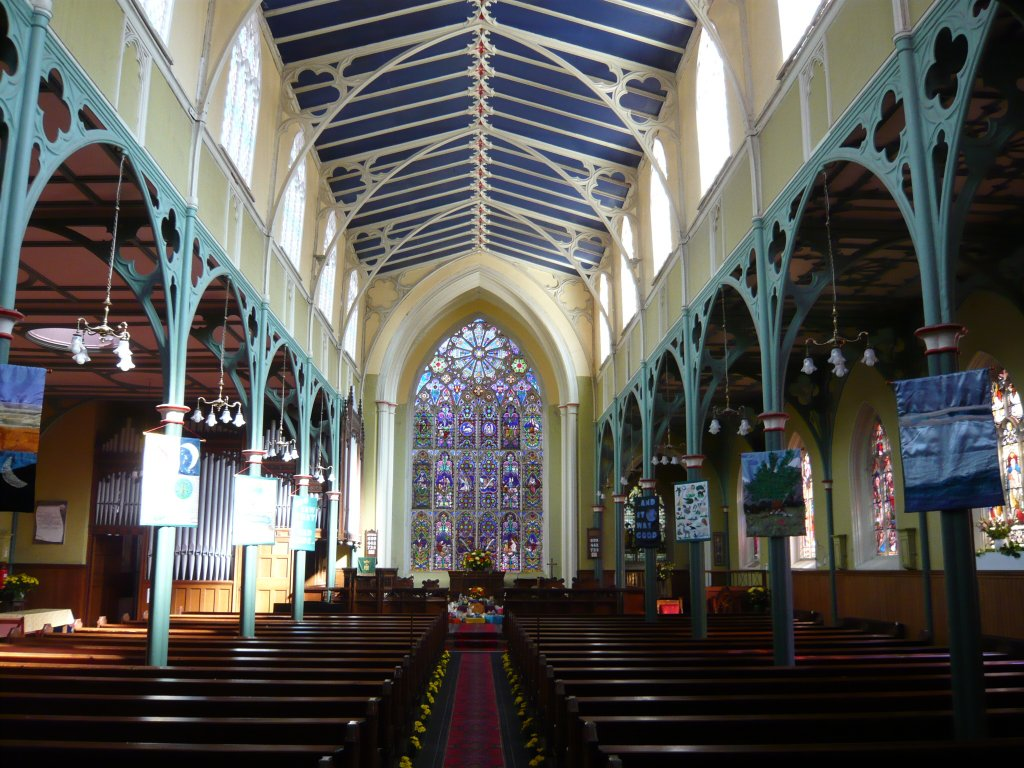
Interior showing cast-iron framework

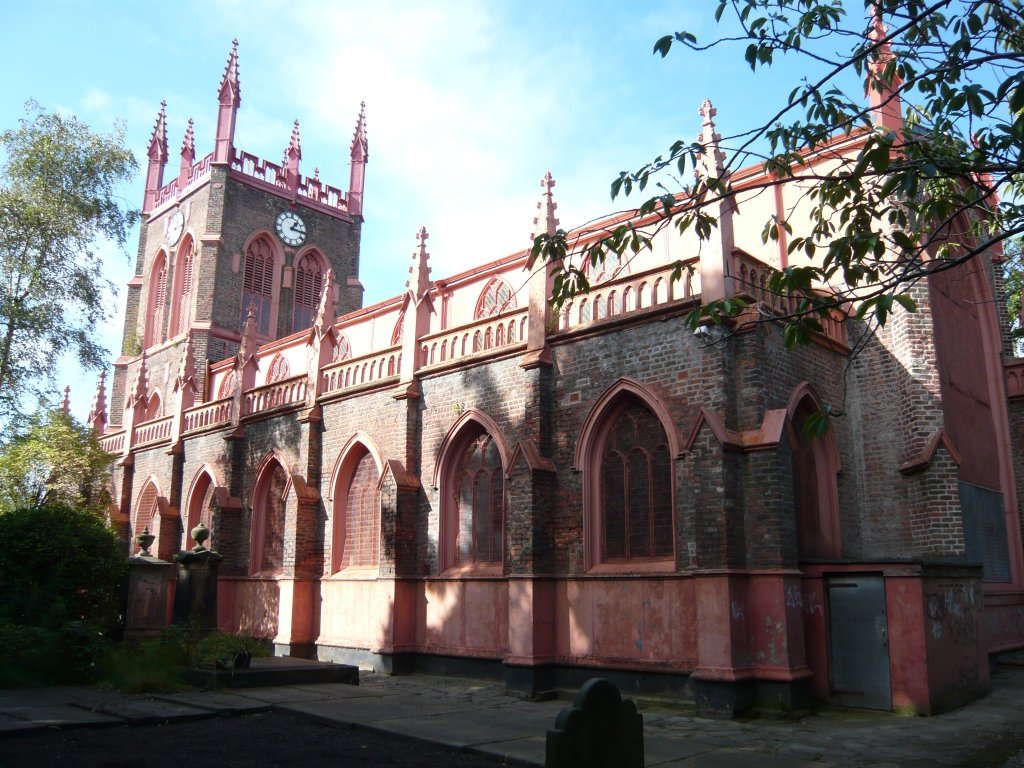
From the South East

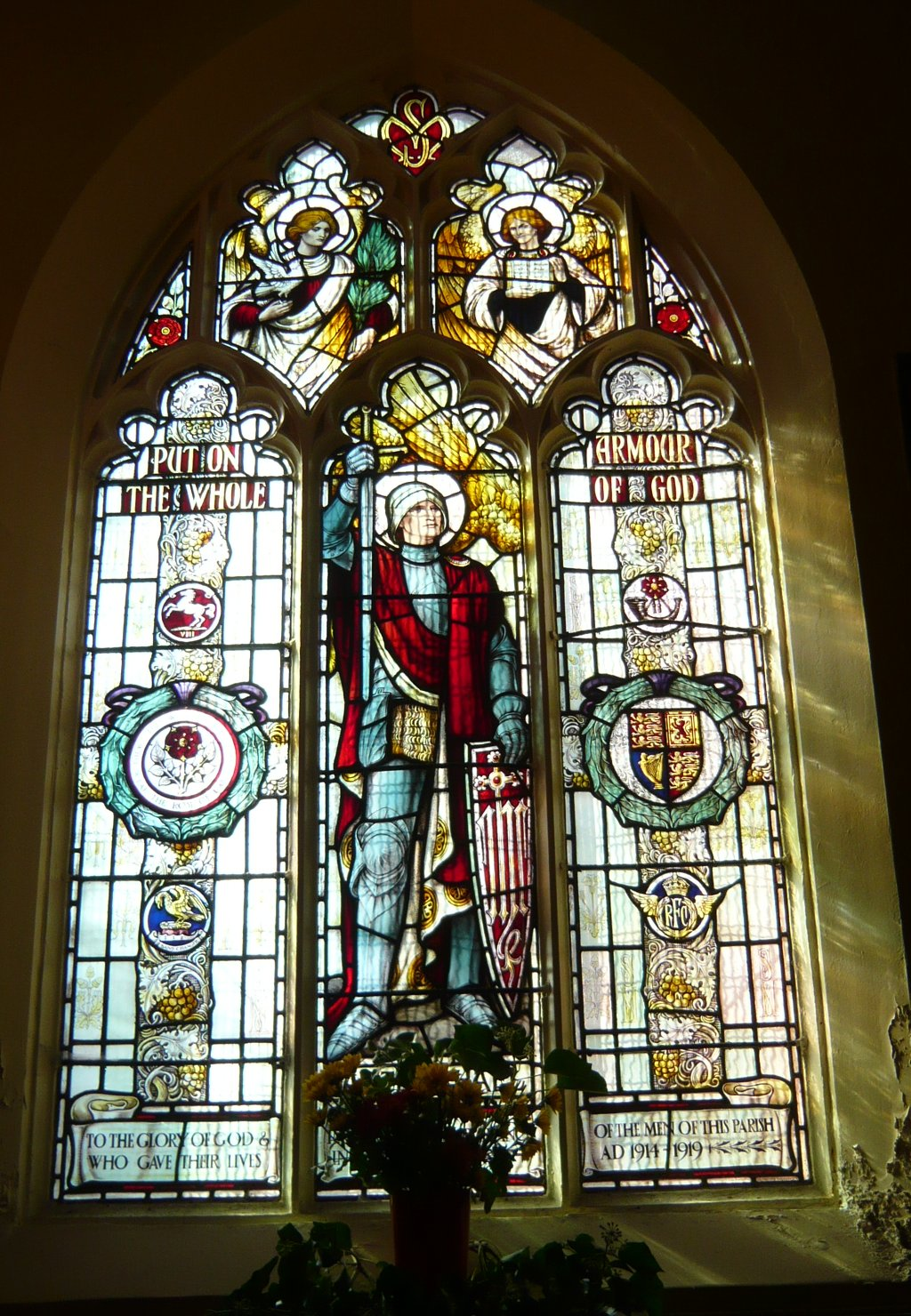
Porch Window

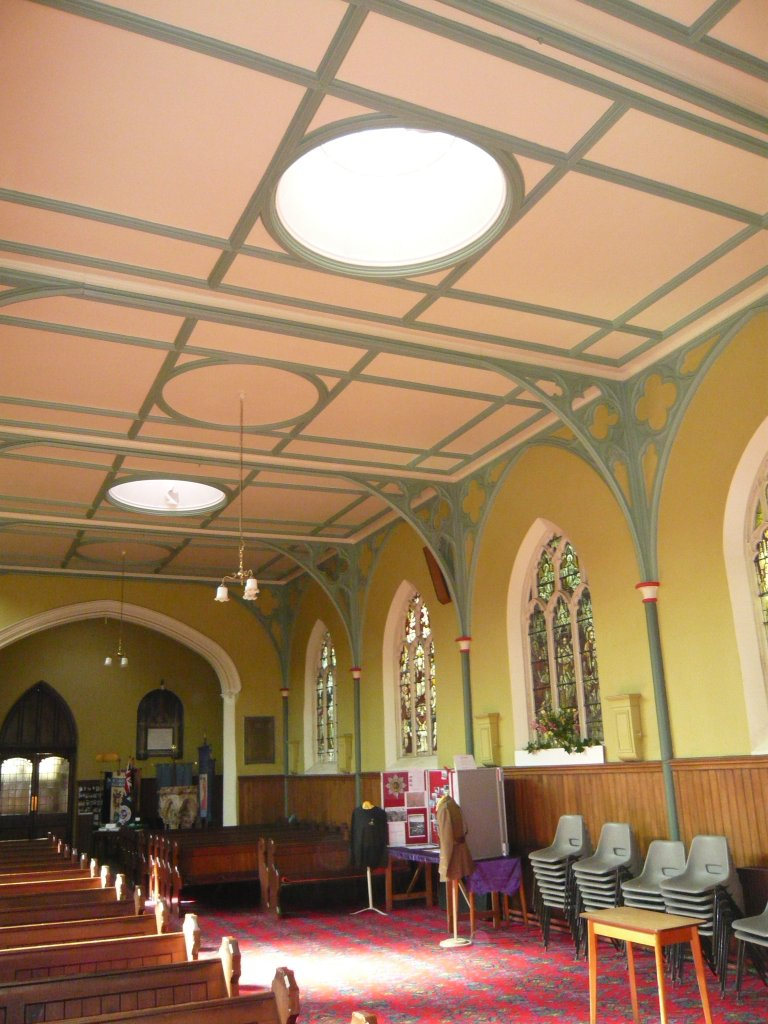
The interior north side

== See also ==
- Grade I listed buildings in Liverpool
- Grade I listed churches in Merseyside
- Paul de Labilliere - Curate here after he was ordained in 1902. Later became Bishop of Knaresborough, and Dean of Westminster.
