= St George's Church, Everton =

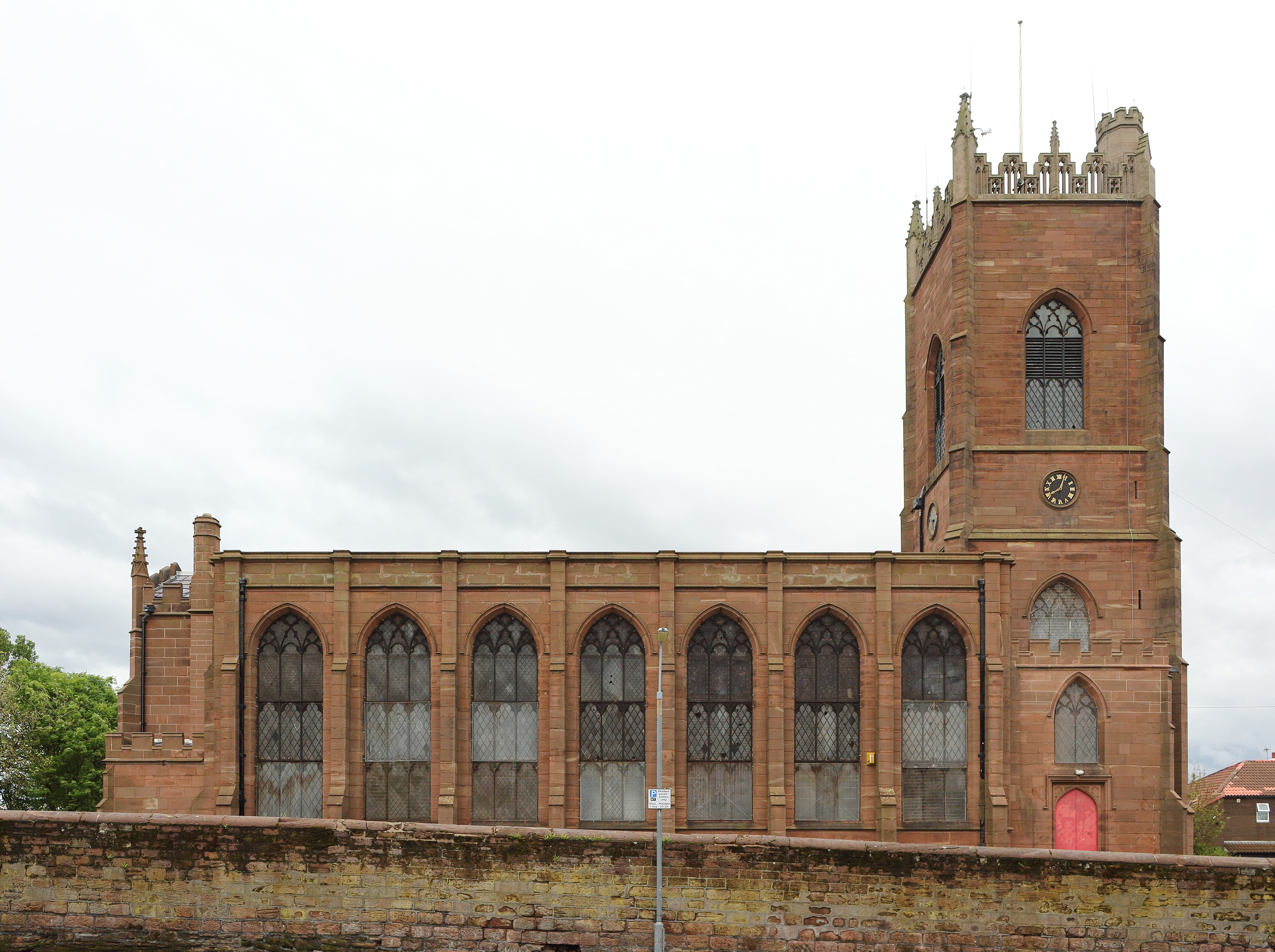
- St George's Church, Everton, from the north
- St George's Church, Everton
- 53.4253°N 2.9715°W
- OS grid reference: SJ 355,925
- Location: Everton, Liverpool, Merseyside
- Country: England
- Denomination: Anglican
- Churchmanship: Charismatic evangelical
- Website: St George, Everton

History
- Status: Parish church
- Dedication: Saint George
- Consecrated: 1814

Architecture
- Functional status: Active
- Heritage designation: Grade I
- Designated: 12 July 1966
- Architect: Thomas Rickman
- Architectural type: Church
- Style: Gothic Revival
- Groundbreaking: 1813
- Completed: 1815

Specifications
- Length: 119 feet (36 m)
- Width: 47 feet (14 m)
- Height: 96 feet (29 m)
- Materials: Ashlar stone with cast iron components

Administration
- Province: York
- Diocese: Liverpool
- Archdeaconry: Liverpool
- Deanery: Liverpool North
- Parish: St George, Everton

Clergy
- Vicar: Position Vacant

St George's Church is in Everton, Liverpool, Merseyside, England. It is recorded in the National Heritage List for England as a designated Grade I listed building, and is the earliest of three churches in Liverpool built by John Cragg, who used many components in cast iron which were made at his Mersey Iron Foundry. (Note: The other "cast iron churches" in Liverpool were St Michael's Church, Aigburth and St Philip's Church (since demolished) in Hardman Street.) It is an active Anglican parish church in the Diocese of Liverpool, the Liverpool archdeaconry, and the Liverpool North deanery.

== History ==
The Liverpool merchant James Atherton, who later established the seaside resort of New Brighton, Wirral, donated the land for the church. He positioned it at the rear of his villa, atop the hill where the Everton Beacon had stood prior to its destruction by a storm in 1803. The building of the church was enabled by an Act of Parliament, the St. George's Church, Everton Act, which was passed in 1813. The foundation stone was laid on 19 April 1813 and the church was consecrated by the Bishop of Chester on 26 October 1814. The architect was Thomas Rickman and the church was built by John Cragg.

== Structure ==
The outer shell of the church is built in stone while the interior is in cast iron. Its plan consists of a west tower, a seven-bay nave with aisles, and a short chancel. Porches flank the tower and chancel. The tower has diagonal buttresses, an arched west door with a three-light window above. The next stage has a clock on three faces and above this are three-light bell-openings which are partly glazed and partly louvred. On the summit is an embattled parapet with pinnacles at the corners. All the windows have cast iron tracery. Internally the nave has arcades of cast iron and the aisles have galleries. The roof is of cast iron. The architectural style of the church is Perpendicular. Tie rods were added in the 20th century.

== Fittings and furniture ==
Most of the stained glass was destroyed in the Second World War. The only complete survivor is a window dated 1863 by A. Gibbs. The glass in the east window dates from 1952 and is by Shrigley and Hunt. The memorials include one under the tower to John Rackham who died in 1815 which was designed by Thomas Rickham and carved by S. & J. Franceys, a memorial to Thomas W. Wainwright, a surgeon who died in 1841 with a relief of the Good Samaritan by William Spence, and in the north gallery is a Gothic tabernacle by Emanuel Edward Geflowski to the memory of engineer Walter Fergus MacGregor who died in 1863. The original chair frame bell was made by Ainsworth of Warrington. It was restored in 1937 by George Eccles but vandalised in the late 1960s. The present clock was made by Smiths of Clerkenwell and installed in 1973.

== See also ==
- Grade I listed buildings in Liverpool
- Grade I listed churches in Merseyside
