= Horsfall =

Horsfall is a surname. Notable people with the surname include:

- Alan Horsfall (1926–2007), English rugby league footballer, played for Leeds and Castleford
- Albert Horsfall (born 1941), Nigerian security chief and prominent nationalist
- Alfred Horsfall (1871–1944), Australian military surgeon
- Allan Horsfall (1927–2012), British gay rights campaigner
- Basil Horsfall (1887–1918), British-Ceylonese recipient of the Victoria Cross
- Bernard Horsfall (1930–2013), British actor
- Charles Horsfall (1776–1846), British politician and Lord Mayor of Liverpool
- Dick Horsfall (1920–1981), English cricketer, played for Essex and Glamorgan
- Douglas Horsfall (1856–1936), British stockbroker, benefactor and builder of churches
- Ewart Horsfall (1892–1974), British Olympic rower
- Frank Horsfall (1906–1971), American physician
- George Horsfall (1924–1992), Australian-born footballer, played for Southampton and Southend United
- James G. Horsfall (1905–1995), American biologist
- John Horsfall (disambiguation), several people
- Robert Bruce Horsfall (1869–1948), American wildlife illustrator
- Simon Horsfall (born 1976), English cricketer, played for Staffordshire
- St. John Horsfall (1910–1949), British motor racing driver
- Thomas Berry Horsfall (1805–1878), British Conservative MP for Liverpool
- Thomas Coglan Horsfall (1841–1932), British philanthropist and founder of the Manchester Art Museum
- Tommy Horsfall (born 1951), Scottish footballer, played for Southend United and Cambridge United
- William H. Horsfall (1847–1922), American Medal of Honor recipient during the American Civil War
- William R. Horsfall (1907–1998), American entomologist

== See also ==
- Horsfall baronets, two baronetcies in the United Kingdom and Ireland
- Horsfall family, a family notable in Liverpool, UK, especially as builders of churches
- Horsfall Stadium, a football stadium located in Bradford, West Yorkshire, England
- Horsfall Museum, an art museum, more commonly known as 'The Manchester Art Museum'
- Tamm–Horsfall protein
