= Edward Horsfall =

Edward Horsfall may refer to:

- Edward Horsfall (rugby union) (1917–1981), English rugby union international
- Edward Horsfall of the Horsfall Baronets
