= Isely =

Isely is a surname. Notable people with the surname include:

- Duane Isely (1918–2000), American professor of botany
- Dwight Isely (1887–1974), American entomologist
- Margaret Isely (1921–1997), American businesswoman
- Philip Isely (1915–2012), American peace activist

== See also ==
- Iseli
