= Douglas Horsfall =

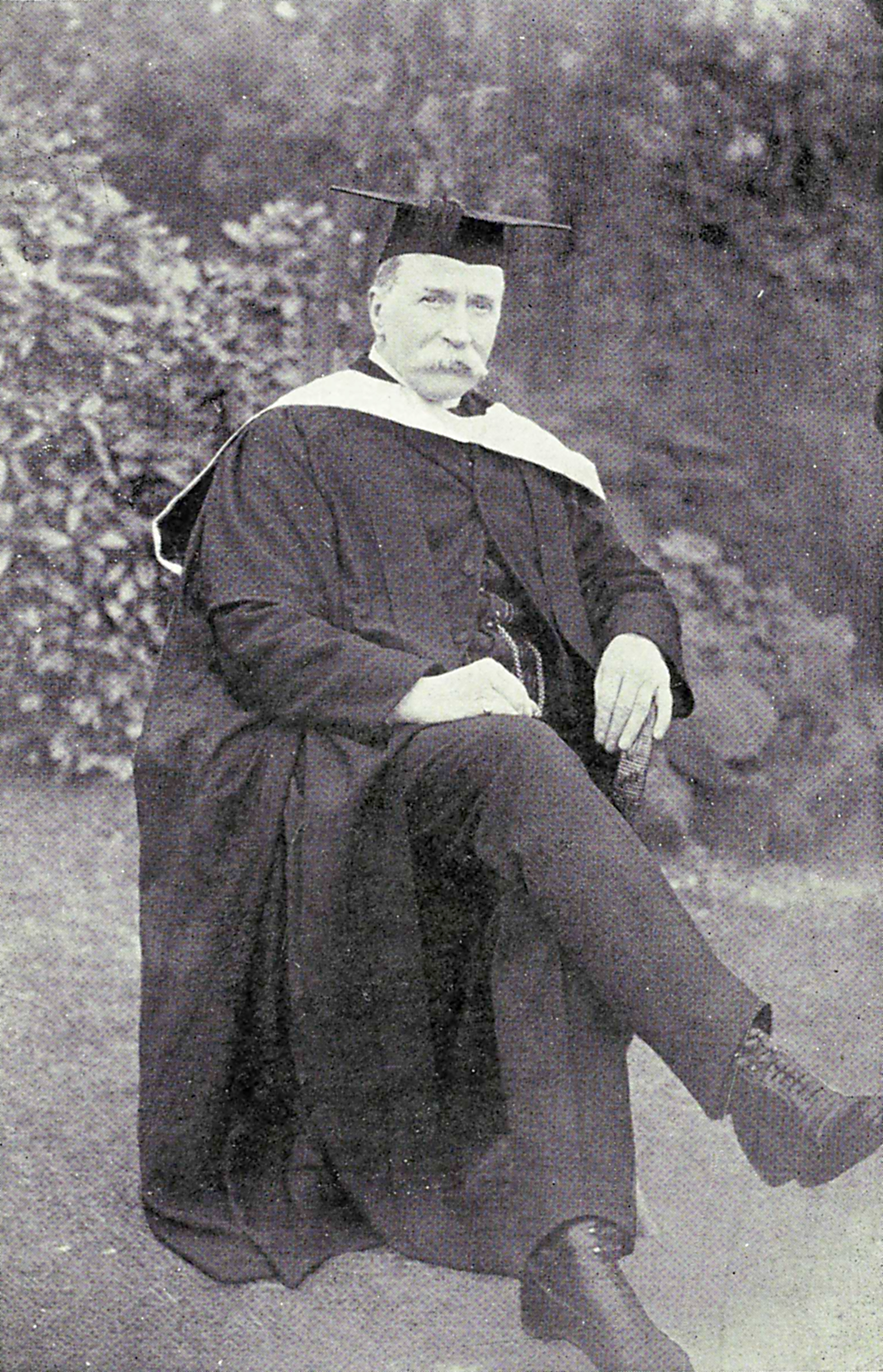
Horsfall in Durham MA dress, from The Stag, the magazine of St Chad's Hall, Durham, Epiphany Term 1911

Howard Douglas Horsfall (1856 – February 1936) was a stockbroker and benefactor based in Liverpool, England. He is remembered for building churches in Liverpool, and as a founding benefactor of St Chad's College, Durham.

== Early life and education ==
He was the second son of Robert Horsfall, and nephew of Thomas Horsfall, MP for Liverpool.

The Horsfall family had a tradition of building churches: Douglas' grandfather, Charles, was a founder of St George's Church, Everton, and Charles' sons built Christ Church, Everton in his memory. Douglas' father Robert had firm Anglo-Catholic convictions, and funded the building of the Church of St Margaret of Antioch, Liverpool, in 1868.

He studied at Eton College (with William Johnson Cory as his tutor) in 1870–71, before entering his father's stockbroking firm.

== Benefactions ==
=== Churches ===
Like his father, Horsfall was a firm supporter of the Anglo-Catholic movement, and his benefactions reflected this aim.

In 1883, Horsfall, with his mother, funded the building of the Church of St Agnes and St Pancras, Toxteth Park. It was designed by John Loughborough Pearson and described by Nikolaus Pevsner as "by far the most beautiful Victorian church of Liverpool...an epitome of Late Victorian nobility in church design". in 1975 it received the highest Grade I listing for historical significance.

In 1900 he funded the building of St Faith's Church in Great Crosby.

In 1906, he founded the small chapel of St Pancras, Sefton Park, as a daughter church to St Agnes. This closed in 1937 and was used as a school hall until its demolition in 2003.

In 1913 he funded the building of the Church of St Paul, Liverpool, designed by Giles Gilbert Scott. It is Europe's largest brick-built church, and was used by Scott as a test bed for many ideas later used in Liverpool Cathedral.

Horsfall was also a member of the original committee for the building of Liverpool Cathedral; though he did not make any donation to its building.

=== St Chad's College ===
In 1904, he became the major benefactor involved in the founding of St Chad's Hall at Durham University, to train Anglo-Catholic priests to serve in the Church of England. He retained this link and continued to give to the hall throughout his life, and was celebrated as "Fundator Noster" (our founder) in the college magazine (although in recent years the college has shared that title with Julia Warde-Aldam, benefactor of the predecessor institution St Chad's Hostel). In 1907, the University awarded Horsfall an honorary degree of Master of Arts in recognition of this support.

The hall survives as St Chad's College, Durham, and Horsfall's portrait hangs over the high table in the dining hall.

== Personal life ==
In 1887 he married Mabel, daughter of Egerton Parks Smith, and had two sons and two daughters.

His elder son, Captain Robert Elcum Horsfall (1890–1917), studied at Eton College, then worked with Professor John Garstang on archaeological investigations in Egypt and Mesopotamia (including at the discovery of the Meroë Head), before enrolling at King's College, Cambridge. In 1914, he enlisted in the King's Regiment (Liverpool) and was appointed Captain of the 12 Battalion in 1916. He was killed in action in Cambrai on 20 November 1917, aged 27. Oxford University holds a collection of 450 negatives taken by him in Egypt.

Douglas' younger son, Major Ewart Horsfall M.C (1892–1974), was an Olympic and university rower who competed in the 1912 and 1920 Olympic Games before going on to manage the British Olympic rowing team.
