= Christ Church, Toxteth Park =

Coordinates: 53.3848°N 2.9486°W

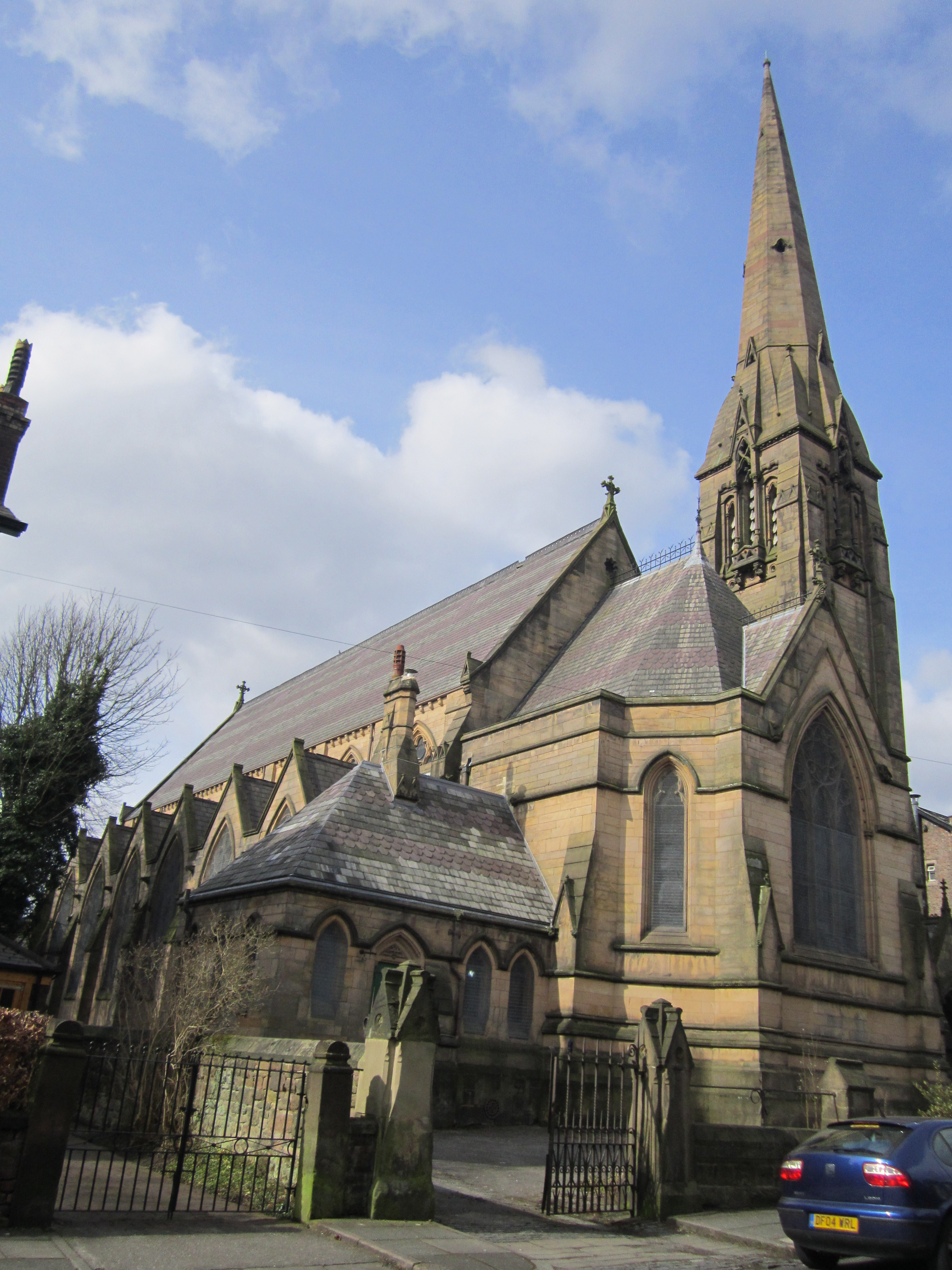
- Christ Church, Toxteth Park, from the southeast

- Location in Merseyside
- OS grid reference: SJ 370 860
- Location: Linnet Lane, Liverpool, Merseyside
- Country: England
- Denomination: Anglican
- Website: christchurchtoxtethpark.org

History
- Status: Parish church
- Founded: 1867
- Founder: George Horsfall
- Consecrated: 27 April 1871

Architecture
- Functional status: Active
- Heritage designation: Grade II
- Designated: 19 June 1985
- Architect: Culshaw and Sumners
- Architectural type: Church
- Style: Gothic Revival
- Groundbreaking: 1867
- Completed: 1871
- Construction cost: Nearly £20,000

Specifications
- Materials: Stone, slate roofs

Administration
- Province: York
- Diocese: Liverpool
- Archdeaconry: Liverpool
- Deanery: Wavertree and Toxteth
- Parish: Christ Church, Toxteth Park

Clergy
- Vicar: Revd Keith Hitchman

Christ Church, Toxteth Park, is in Linnet Lane, Liverpool, Merseyside, England. It is an active Anglican parish church in the deanery of Wavertree and Toxteth, the archdeaconry of Liverpool, and the diocese of Liverpool. Its benefice is united with that of St Michael, Aigburth. The church is recorded in the National Heritage List for England as a designated Grade II listed building.

== History ==
Christ Church was built in 1867–71 to a design of Culshaw and Sumners and funded by George Horsfall. (Note: George Horsfall (1824–1900) came from a family of church benefactors. His father, Charles, a merchant, had been mayor of Liverpool.) The church cost about £20,000 to build (equivalent to £2,040,000 in 2025). It was consecrated by the Rt Revd William Jacobson, bishop of Chester, on 27 April 1871.

== Architecture ==
=== Exterior ===
The church is constructed in stone with slate roofs. Its architectural style is Decorated Gothic. The plan consists of a six-bay nave with a clerestory, north and south aisles, a canted chancel with a three-bay vestry to the south and a two-bay porch to the north, and a north tower with a broach spire. The tower has angle buttresses, three-light louvred bell openings, the middle light on each side having a balcony carried on angel corbels. On the tower is a broach spire with the bowed broaches. At the west end is a five-light window containing Geometric tracery. The windows along the sides of the aisles have three lights and are placed between buttresses. The clerestory windows are lunettes with pointed arches. The east window has three lights. The porch features a hipped roof and entrances on the north and east sides. The vestry, also with a hipped roof, is approached by steps.

=== Interior ===
Inside the church the arcades are carried on slender quatrefoil piers that have capitals carved with foliage. The nave has a hammerbeam roof. The sanctuary floor and the reredos date from 1930 and were designed by Bernard Miller. The stained glass in the apse appears to be contemporary with the church, and was possibly designed by Hardman. In the south aisle are two early 20th-century windows by Gustave Hiller; one of which has a depiction of the east end of Liverpool Cathedral. There are also two windows by Shrigley and Hunt. The original pipe organ had three manuals and was built by C. and J. Whiteley. This was superseded by an organ, also with three manuals, by Willis.

== The church today ==
The church now forms part of a united benefice with St Michael-in-the-Hamlet. Christ Church subscribes to the Inclusive Church statement of belief:

We believe in a church which seeks not to discriminate, on any level, on grounds of economic power, gender, mental health, physical ability, race or sexuality. We believe in Church which welcomes and serves all people in the name of Jesus Christ; which is scripturally faithful; which seeks to proclaim the Gospel afresh for each generation; and which, in the power of the Holy Spirit, allows all people to grasp how wide and long and high and deep is the love of Jesus Christ.

The church meets for worship every Sunday at 10.30am, with Holy Communion twice a week. The church also meets informally through the week, and is involved in community activities, including operating a community pantry.

== See also ==
- Grade II listed buildings in Liverpool-L17

== Notes and references ==
Notes

Citations

Sources

- Sharples, Joseph; Pollard, Richard (2004), Liverpool, Pevsner Architectural Guides, New Haven and London: Yale University Press, ISBN 0-300-10258-5
