= John Horsfall =

John Horsfall is the name of:

- John Horsfall (bishop)
- Sir John Cousin Horsfall, 1st Baronet (1846–1920) of the Horsfall baronets
- Sir (John) Donald Horsfall, 2nd Baronet (1891–1975) of the Horsfall baronets
- Sir John Musgrave Horsfall, MC, JP, 3rd Baronet (1915–2005) of the Horsfall baronets
