= Robert Horsfall =

Robert Horsfall may refer to:

- Robert Horsfall (stockbroker) (1807–1881)
- Robert Bruce Horsfall (1869–1948), American wildlife illustrator
