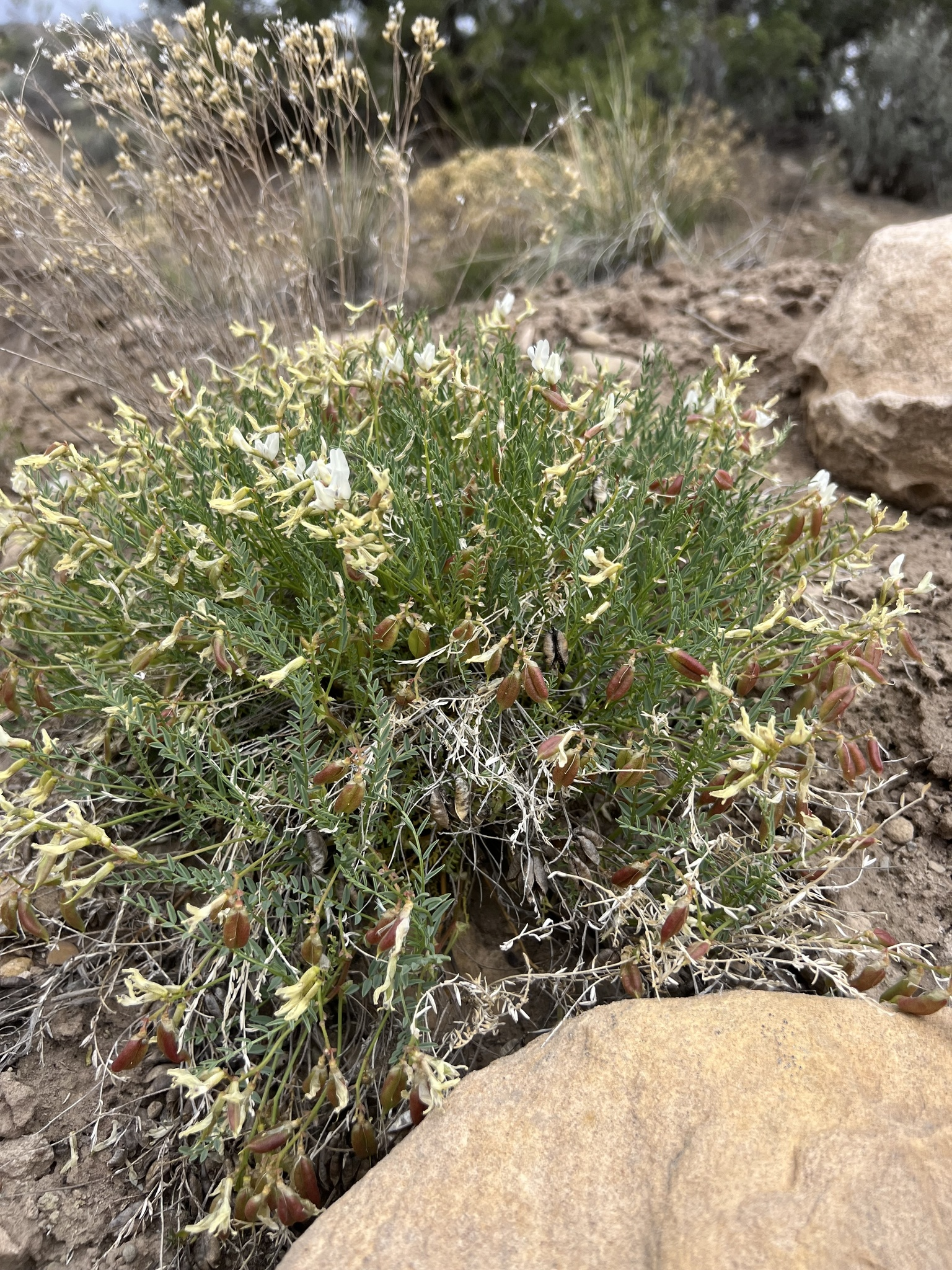
- With a few flowers and many pods

Scientific classification
- Kingdom: Plantae
- Clade: Tracheophytes
- Clade: Angiosperms
- Clade: Eudicots
- Clade: Rosids
- Order: Fabales
- Family: Fabaceae
- Subfamily: Faboideae
- Genus: Astragalus
- Species: A. debequaeus

Binomial name
- Astragalus debequaeus S.L.Welsh

Synonyms
- Astragalus eastwoodiae var. debequaeus (S.L.Welsh) Isely

= Astragalus debequaeus =

Plant species in the pea family

Astragalus debequaeus, the DeBeque milkvetch, is a rare species in the pea family from western Colorado.

== Description ==
The DeBeque milkvetch is a perennial species that forms a clump of closely packed hairless stems 14 to 30 centimeters (5.5–11.8 in) tall. Each clump ranges in size from 20 to 100 centimeters (8–39 in) across and has a woody taproot topped by a branching caudex. The stems can lay on the soil surface or curve to grow upwards.

The compound leaves are 2–10 cm (0.79–3.94 in) long and have 13 to 21 leaflets with one leaflet attached to the end of the leaf.

The flowers have white petals and are 1.7 to 2.1 cm.

Its fruits are inflated pods that are 1.5–2.3 cm long and 0.6–1.1 cm wide, containing 20 to 38 seeds.

== Taxonomy ==
The botanist Stanley Larson Welsh scientifically described a new species in 1985 which he named Astragalus debequaeus. It is part of the genus Astragalus which is classified in the Fabaceae family. It has no accepted varieties, but was described by Duane Isely as a variety of Astragalus eastwoodiae in 1998.

Both the scientific name Astragalus debequaeus and the common name DeBeque milkvetch refer to the town of DeBeque, near where it was discovered. The name is also spelled as Debeque milkvetch.

== Range and habitat ==
DeBeque milkvetch is a narrow endemic only native to Mesa, Garfield, and Delta counties in western Colorado. There it is found in 24 locations near the town of DeBeque in the Colorado River drainage. There it grows on fine soils that are high in selenium or salt at elevations of 1,600–2,000 meters (5,200–6,600 ft).
