= William Horsfall =

William Horsfall may refer to:

- William H. Horsfall (1847–1922), American soldier and Medal of Honor recipient
- William R. Horsfall (1907–1998), American entomologist
