= Richard Deane (bishop) =

Irish Anglican bishop

Richard Deane was Bishop of Ossory from 1610 until his death in 1613.

Deane was educated at Merton College, Oxford and held the office of Dean of Ossory from 1603 until 1610. He died on 20 February 1613.

== Notes ==
Church of Ireland titles
Preceded by John Horsfall	Bishop of Ossory; 1586–1609	Succeeded by Jonas Wheeler
