= Horsfall–Barratt scale =

Plant disease assessment scale

The Horsfall–Barratt scale is a system used in plant pathology to assess plant diseases where each plant is assigned a numerical value according to the percentage of leaf area showing disease symptoms. The Horsfall–Barratt scale was designed by James G. Horsfall and R.W. Barratt to compensate for human error (and logarithmic laws of perception) in estimating the amount of disease present. The scale is as follows:

Index	Percent Affected
1	0
2	0 to 3
3	3 to 6
4	6 to 12
5	12 to 25
6	25 to 50
7	50 to 75
8	75 to 87
9	87 to 94
10	94 to 97
11	97 to 100
12	100

The scale is often used in modified form with index values from 0–11 or with different numbers of index points.
