= Iseli =

Iseli is a German surname. Notable people with the surname include:

- Rolf Iseli (born 1934), Swiss painter
- Rolf Iseli, Swiss curler and curling coach
- Tee Mac Omatshola Iseli, Nigerian flutist

== See also ==
- Isely
