= Horsfall family =

Family known primarily for building churches in Liverpool, England

The Horsfall family was a family notable in Liverpool, UK, especially as traders at the heart of British trade with Africa after 1807, and as religious benefactors whose churches are among the most important religious buildings in the city.

Churches in Liverpool built or contributed to by members of the Horsfall Family

== Charles Horsfall ==
Charles Horsfall (1776–1846) was born in Yorkshire and earned his fortune as a merchant and slave-holder in Jamaica before returning to England around 1803 and settling in Everton near Liverpool.

He founded Charles Horsfall and Sons, which was Britain's largest palm oil importer on several occasions between 1835 and 1850. In the late 1830s, he handed control over to his eldest son, Thomas.

He was mayor of Liverpool in 1832.

He subscribed to the fund to build St George's Church, Everton.

On his death, his 13 children built Christ Church, Great Homer Street, Everton in his memory. It was consecrated on 30 October 1848, but was destroyed by German bombing in the Liverpool Blitz of 1941.

== Thomas Berry Horsfall ==
Thomas Berry Horsfall (1805–1878), son of Charles, was Member of Parliament for Liverpool for over 15 years, as well as Lord Mayor of Liverpool.

In the late 1830s, he took over Charles Horsfall and Sons from his father, later handing control to his younger brother George. He was Chairman of the Liverpool

He donated land to build Christ Church, Great Homer Street, Everton. He also gave £600 (equivalent to £71,000 in 2023) to the Church Missionary Society to build a mission church in Bonny, Nigeria.

== Robert Horsfall ==
Robert Horsfall (1807–1881), son of Charles, was a stockbroker of Anglo-Catholic views. He established Horsfall Brothers stockbrokers.

In 1846-8 he was the primary commissioner of Christ Church, Great Homer Street, Everton, on land donated by his elder brother Thomas, in memory of their father. In 1869 he founded both the church of St James the Less, Kirkdale and the Church of St Margaret of Antioch, Liverpool.

Both Christ Church Everton and St James the Less Kirkdale were destroyed in the Liverpool Blitz in May 1941.

== George Horsfall ==
George Henry Horsfall (1824–1900), son of Charles, was a successful merchant, who took over running of Horsfall and Sons from his older brother Thomas. He was also a Conservative councillor who served on Liverpool council for 16 years. He was staunchly Evangelical, and founded Christ Church, Toxteth Park in 1871.

== Howard Douglas Horsfall ==
Howard Douglas Horsfall (1856–1936), son of Robert, was a stockbroker based in Liverpool. A keen Anglo-Catholic, he was the principal benefactor of St Chad's College in the University of Durham, originally as a training college for Anglo-Catholic clergy in the Church of England.

He also founded:

- Church of St Agnes and St Pancras, Toxteth Park in 1885
- St Faith's Church, Great Crosby, in 1900
- Chapel of St Pancras, Sefton Park, in 1906
- St Paul's Church, Stoneycroft in 1916

== Robert Elcum Horsfall ==
Captain Robert Elcum Horsfall (1890–1917) was the elder son of Douglas Horsfall. He studied at Eton College, then worked with Professor John Garstang on archaeological investigations in Egypt and Mesopotamia (including at the discovery of the Meroë Head), before enrolling at King's College, Cambridge. In 1914, he enlisted in the King's Regiment (Liverpool) and was appointed Captain of the 12 Battalion in 1916. He was killed in action in Cambrai on 20 November 1917, aged 27. Oxford University holds a collection of 450 negatives taken by him in Egypt.

== Ewart Douglas Horsfall ==
Major Ewart Douglas Horsfall MC (1892–1974) was the younger son of Douglas Horsfall, and was a rower, businessman and military officer. He rowed for Oxford University in the Boat Race in 1912–14, and for Great Britain (Leander Club) in the 1912 and 1920 Summer Olympics.

== Gallery ==
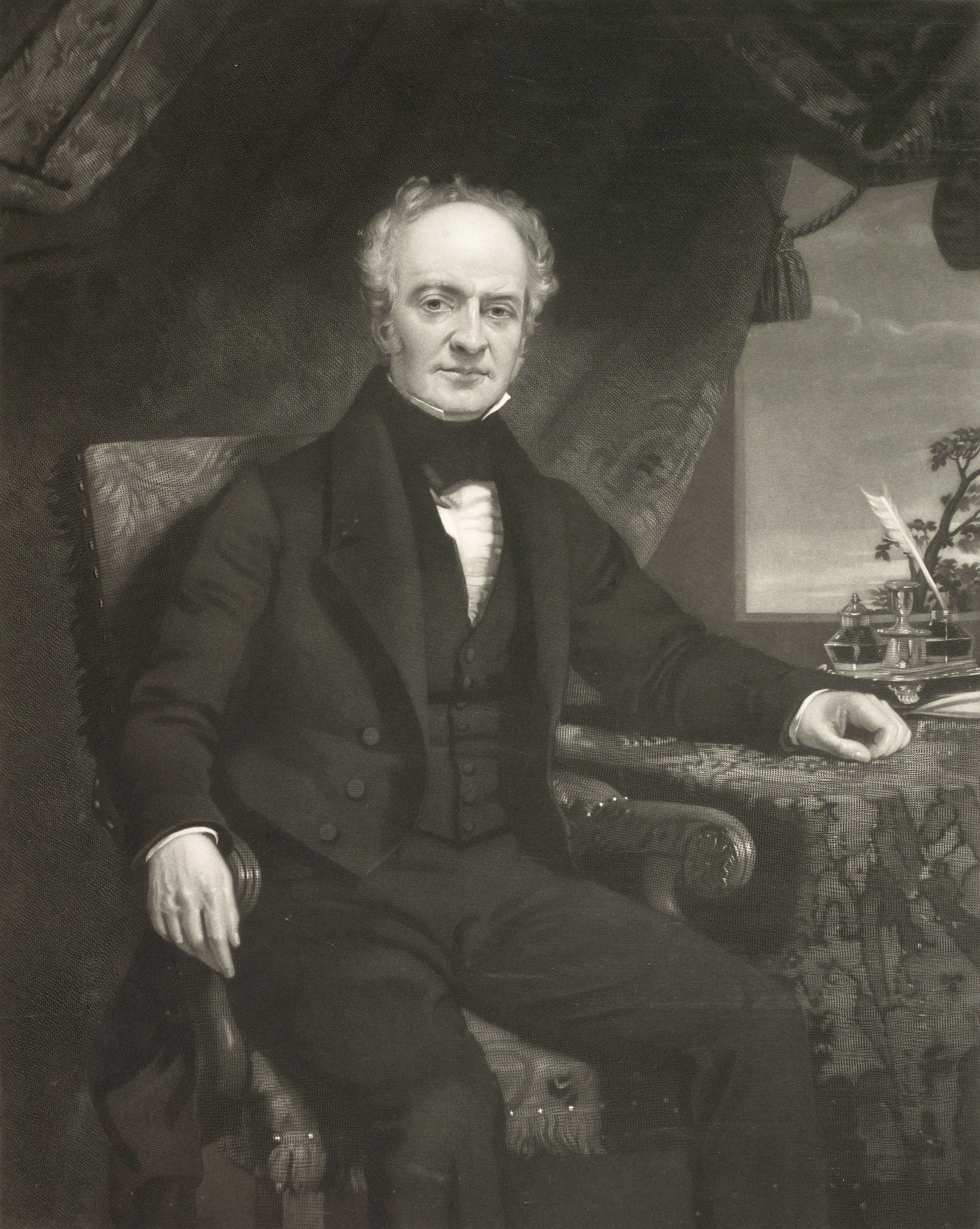
Charles Horsfall
(1776-1846)

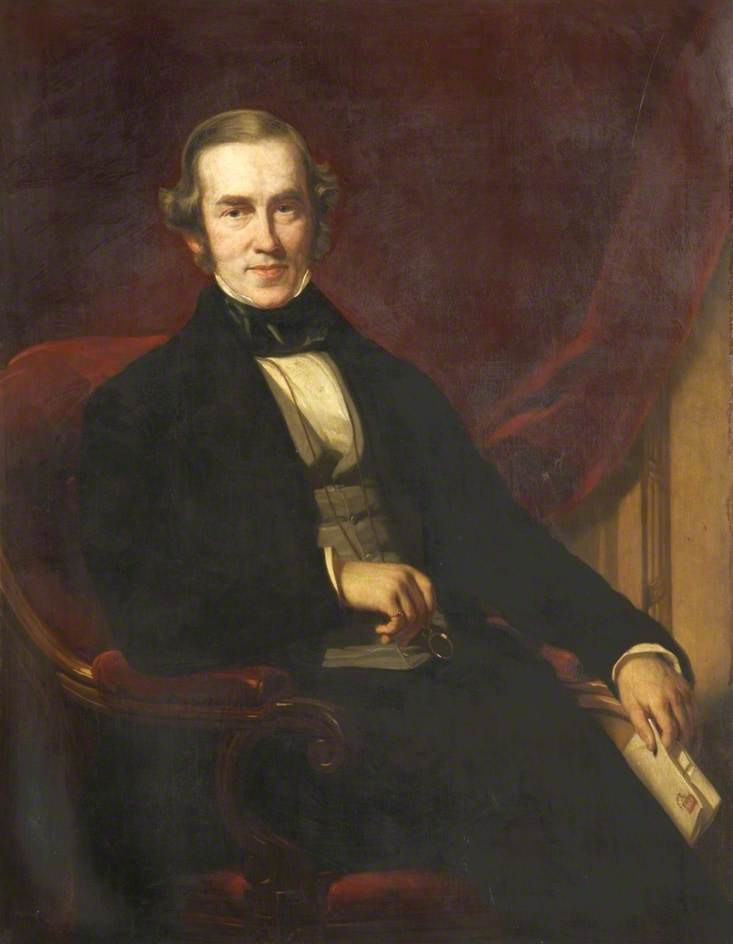
Thomas Berry Horsfall
(1805-1878)

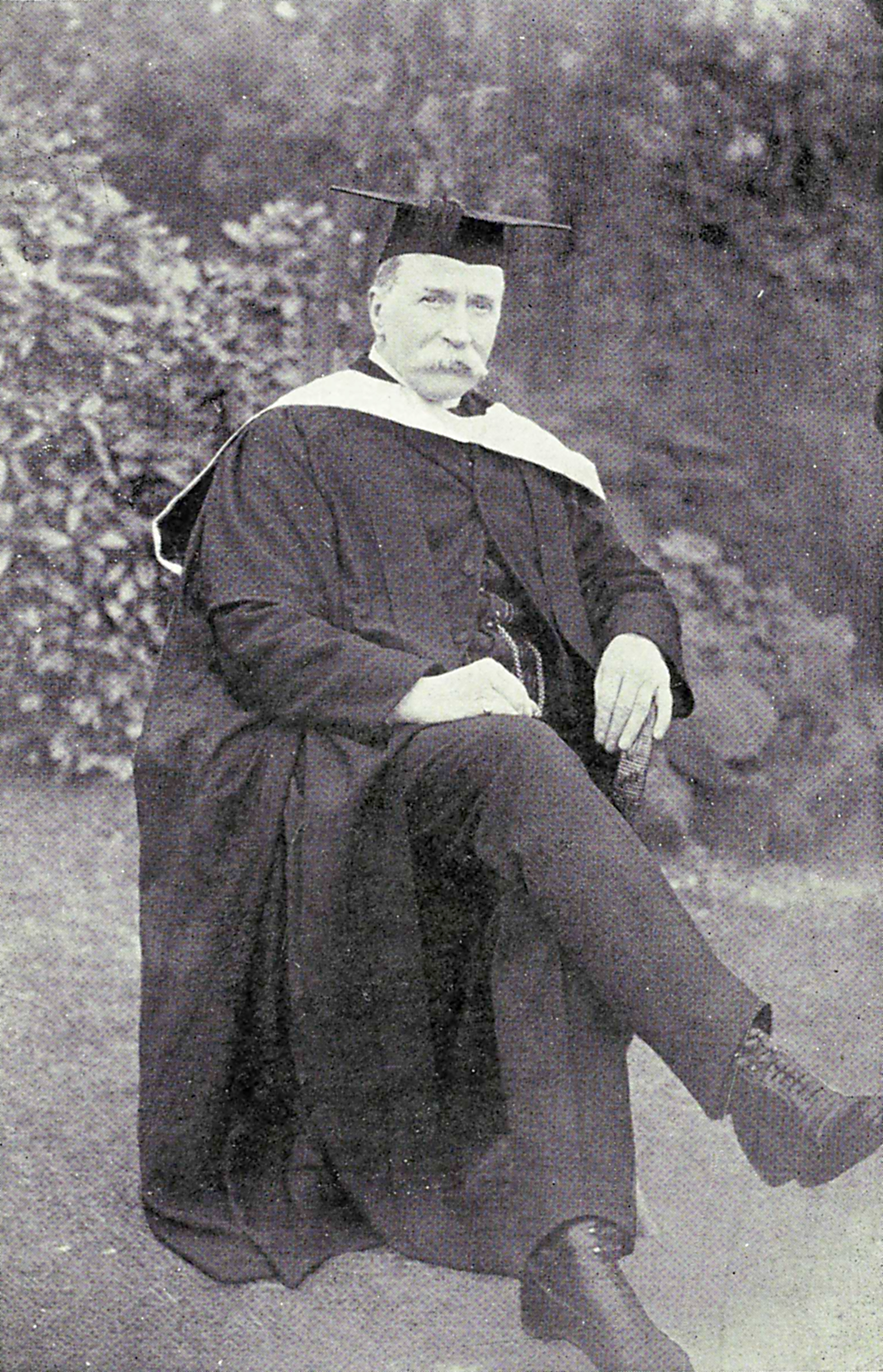
Douglas Horsfall
(1856-1936)

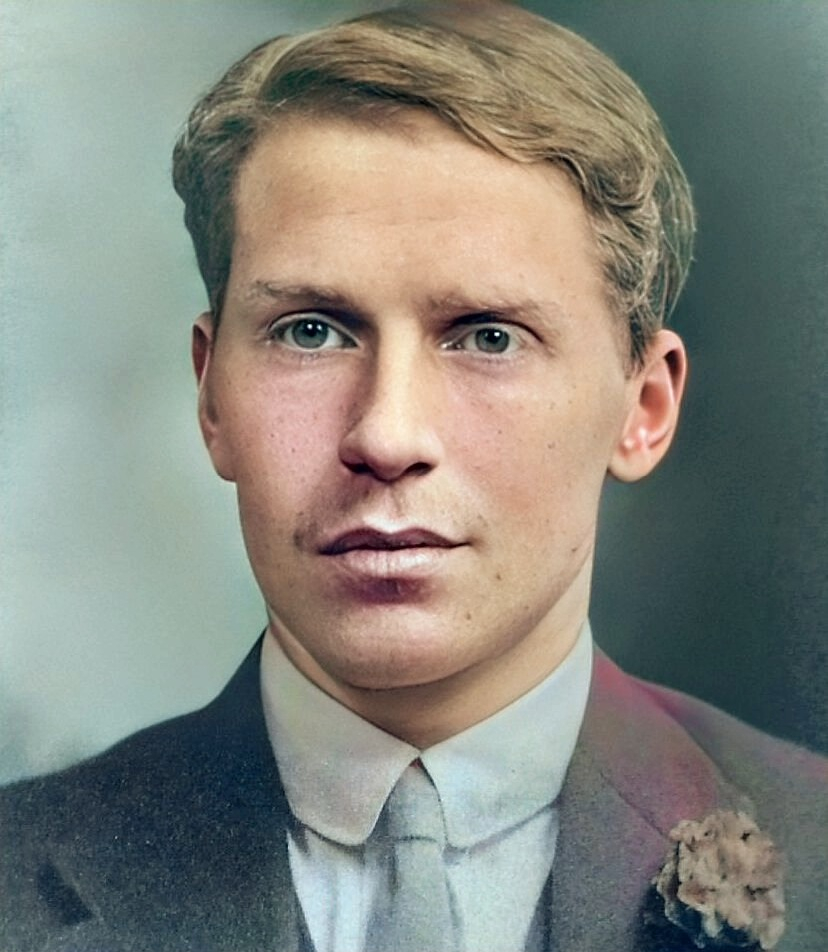
Ewart Horsfall
(1892-1974)
