= James G. Horsfall =

American biologist, plant pathologist and agriculturist

- Born: January 9, 1905; Mountain Grove, Missouri, US
- Died: March 22, 1995 (aged 90)
- Education: Cornell University; University of Arkansas
- Known for: discovery of several organic fungicides
- Scientific career
- Fields: biology; plant pathology; agriculture
- Workplaces: Connecticut Agricultural Experiment Station

James Gordon Horsfall (January 9, 1905 – March 22, 1995) was an American biologist, plant pathologist, and agriculturist. The New York Times described Horsfall as a "leading plant pathologist." Horsfall served as director of the Connecticut Agricultural Experiment Station in New Haven from 1948 to 1971. He was succeeded by Paul E. Waggoner.

== Early life and education ==
Horsfall was born in Mountain Grove, Missouri, and was raised in Monticello, Arkansas. The family came from ship owners in Liverpool. Horsfall's father was interested in horticulture and worked at an experimental fruit growing station. Horsfall studied at University of Arkansas, initially with an interest in cars and engineering. He worked briefly with Dwight Isely, counting insects to determine the timing of insecticide application in cotton. He found himself sidelined, which he claimed was due to his nonconformity. After graduating with a Bachelor of Science degree in 1925, he studied plant pathology at Cornell University, from which he received his doctorate in 1929. His brother, William R. Horsfall, also a Cornell graduate, became a noted entomologist.

== Scientific career ==
Horsfall was most noted for the discovery of several organic fungicides which changed the way crops' fungus diseases are treated worldwide. Prior to his discovery these diseases were treated either with heavy metals which were poisonous to humans or somewhat ineffective sulfur-based compounds. The Horsfall-Barratt scale devised by him, and still in use, allows for the easy assessment of crop damage level based on the extent of leaf damaged by fungal or bacterial infections in the field on a 12-point scale.

Horsfall experimented with tetrachloroquinone to treat diseases since it was a strong oxidant and it was believed that Bordeaux mixture worked through oxidation. Although his experiments made in 1938 showed successful action, it was not possible to publish since the chemical was made by the United States Rubber Company and they made the chemistry known only later. It was however found to break down in sunlight. Horsfall tried 2,3-dichrolo-1,4-naphthoquinone as a substitute.

Horsfall later experimented with sulfur-based organic compounds such as disodium ethylene-bis-dithiocarbamate. This turned out to be water-soluble, and the scientists found that the zinc based analog (zineb) worked better. Horsfall later discovered that sugar concentrations in plant parts was correlated with resistance to fungal infection by Alternaria in potatoes.

Horsfall was a founding editor of Annual Review of Phytopathology. He was also a member of the National Academy of Sciences.

== Personal life ==
In 1927, Horsfall married Sue Belle Overton. The couple had two daughters: Margaret Eleanor Schadler and Anne Vaulx Thomas.

Horsfall died on March 22, 1995, at the age of 90. He was interred in New Haven's historic Grove Street Cemetery.
