= Church of St Agnes and St Pancras, Toxteth Park =

Historic church in Toxteth Park, Liverpool, England

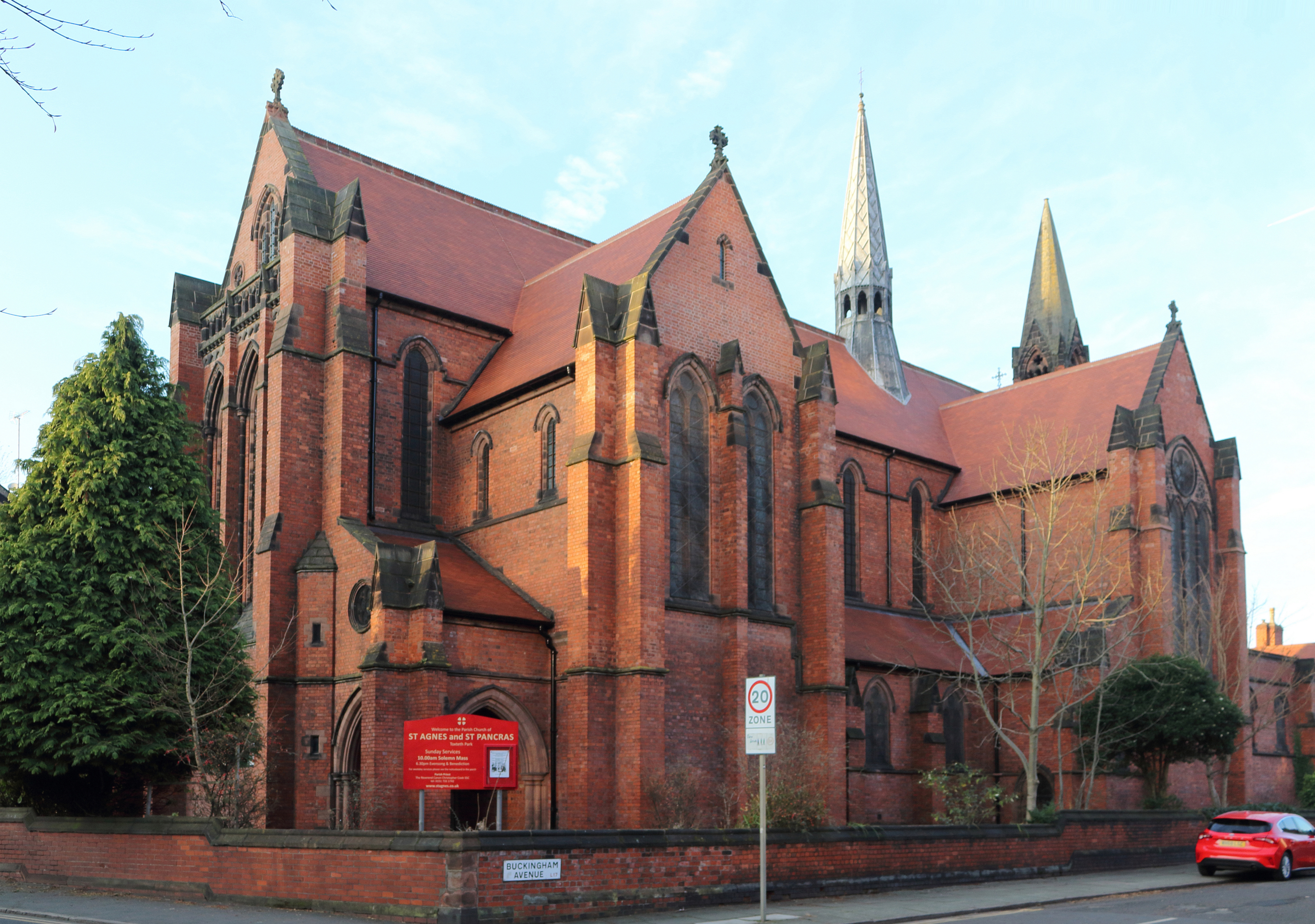
- Church of St Agnes and St Pancras, Toxteth Park
- 53.3895°N 2.9398°W
- OS grid reference: SJ 375,884
- Location: Toxteth Park, Liverpool
- Country: England
- Denomination: Anglican
- Churchmanship: Anglo-Catholic
- Website: www.stagnes.org.uk

History
- Status: Parish church

Architecture
- Functional status: Active
- Heritage designation: Grade I
- Designated: 14 March 1975
- Architect: John Loughborough Pearson
- Architectural type: Church
- Groundbreaking: 1883
- Completed: 1885
- Construction cost: £28,000

Specifications
- Materials: Red brick with red sandstone dressings, tile roof

Administration
- Province: Province of York
- Diocese: Diocese of Liverpool
- Archdeaconry: Archdeaconry of Liverpool
- Deanery: Toxteth and Wavertree

Clergy
- Bishop: Rt Revd Stephen Race SSC (AEO)
- Priest: Fr Andrew Brown

The Church of St Agnes and St Pancras is in Ullet Road, Toxteth Park, Liverpool, England. It is recorded in the National Heritage List for England as a designated Grade I listed building, and is an active Anglican church in the diocese of Liverpool, the archdeaconry of Liverpool and the deanery of Toxteth and Wavertree. Pevsner described it as "by far the most beautiful Victorian church of Liverpool...an epitome of Late Victorian nobility in church design".

== History ==
The church was built between 1883 and 1885 at a cost of £28,000 (equivalent to £3,180,000 in 2025), which was paid for by H. Douglas Horsfall with his mother, following their family tradition of building churches. The architect was John Loughborough Pearson.

=== Present day ===
The parish stands in the Anglo-Catholic tradition of the Church of England. As it rejects the ordination of women, it receives alternative episcopal oversight from the Bishop of Beverley (currently Stephen Race).

== Architecture ==
=== Exterior ===
The church is built in red brick with red sandstone dressings and a tile roof. Its plan consists of a four-bay nave with lean-to aisles and a clerestory, transepts at both ends, a south chapel with lean-to aisles, a short chancel with a canted polygonal apse, and an ambulatory which is flanked by turrets. At the west end are two porches. The west end and the transepts have angle buttresses and gable crosses. Over the east crossing is a lead-covered flèche. The windows are either lancets or have plate tracery.

=== Interior ===
The interior of the church is lined with Caen stone. The northwest transept contains the baptistry with a marble font carved by Nathaniel Hitch, who also worked with Pearson in Truro Cathedral. The nave has arcades with round piers and balconies above. The northeast transept contains the organ loft which consists of a polygonal platform supported by a central column of black marble surrounded by ten more columns around the edges. The south chapel is the Lady Chapel. Its screen of 1904 and reredos of 1904 were designed by G. F. Bodley. The ambulatory runs round the apse and is divided from the sanctuary by an arcade with statues of angel musicians in the spandrels. Above this is a frieze in high relief depicting the Adoration of the Lamb, and above this are statues of angels under canopies. The high altar reredos was carved by Nathaniel Hitch, as were the apse carvings. The pulpit is carved in Italian marble and depicts the Apostles and Church Fathers. The stained glass includes windows by Kempe and Herbert Bryans. The original pipe organ originally built by Wordsworth and Maskell of Leeds, has been unusable since 1996. The fine case and majority of the pipework survive in situ, for restoration should a funds be later made available. The instrument was well regarded for its rich and noble tone, having received attention and enlargement from the pipe organ firms of Rushworth and Dreaper as well as the firm of Walker’s. The console has been removed and replaced by that of an electronic organ which was made by Hugh Banton.

== Associated buildings ==
Behind the church is the vicarage which was built between 1885 and 1887 to a design by Norman Shaw and paid for by H. Douglas Horsfall's mother. It is built in red brick with stone dressings and has two storeys. Its windows are arranged asymmetrically and include a canted oriel window on the street elevation. The vicarage is a Grade II* listed building. Also behind the church and attached to it by a passage is the church hall. It was built probably in 1887 and is also by Shaw. The hall is built in red brick with a tile roof. Its main part has a clerestory and lean-to aisles, and behind this is a smaller single-story room with windows containing tracery. It is listed at Grade II.

== See also ==
- Grade I listed buildings in Merseyside
- Grade I listed churches in Merseyside
- List of new ecclesiastical buildings by J. L. Pearson
