= Ewart Horsfall =

British rower

Ewart Douglas Horsfall MC
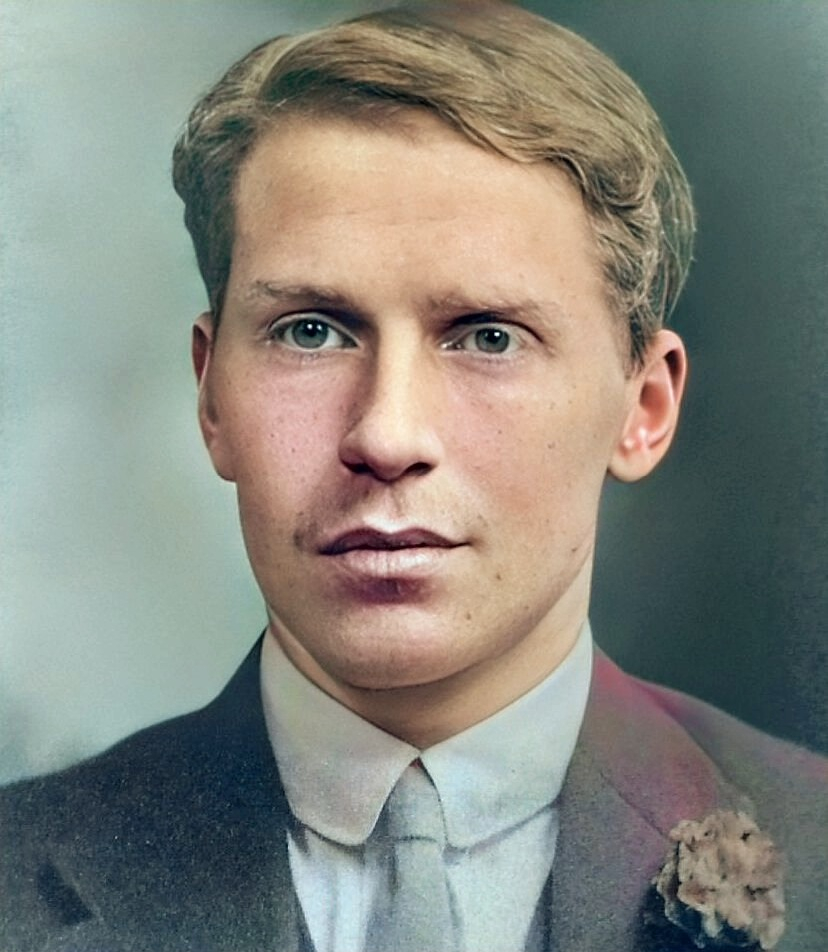
- Ewart Horsfall in around 1910
- Born: 24 May 1892; Liverpool
- Died: 1 February 1974 (aged 81)
- Occupations: Businessman, rower and military officer

Medal record

Men's rowing

Representing Great Britain

Olympic Games
Gold medal – first place	1912 Stockholm	Men's eight
Silver medal – second place	1920 Antwerp	Men's eight

Ewart Douglas Horsfall MC (24 May 1892 – 1 February 1974) was a British rower who competed in the 1912 Summer Olympics and in the 1920 Summer Olympics.

== Personal life ==
Horsfall's first marriage was with Myra Downing Fullerton, daughter of Frederick Downing Fullerton, in 1923. They had three children, Robin, Geoffrey and Anne. After his divorce, he married Betty Fairfax Rushby (1906–2000) in 1946. After her death, she bequeathed money and collections of art, ceramics, furniture and other objects that she mainly had inherited from her parents to the University of Liverpool in his home city of Liverpool.

== Business career ==
He was a member of Liverpool's wealthy Horsfall family. In his time the family traded in palm oil from Africa.

== Sporting career ==
Horsfall was born in Liverpool, the son of Howard Douglas Horsfall and was educated at Eton College and Magdalen College, Oxford. He arrived at Oxford with an outstanding reputation as a rower and, in 1912, was in the winning Oxford boat in the Boat Race.

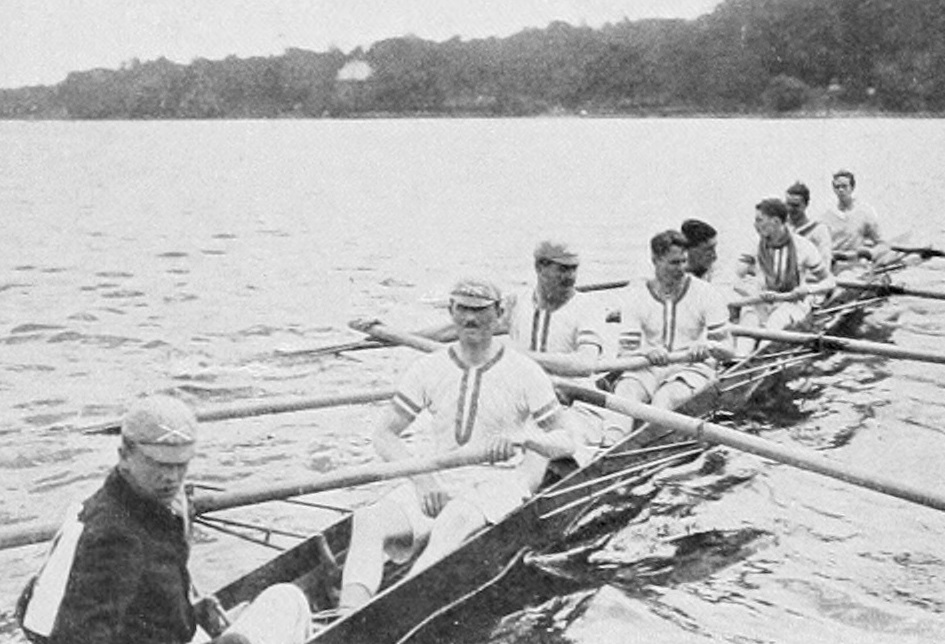
The winning Leander Club eight at the 1912 Olympics (Horsfall 6th from left, wearing scarf)

He joined Leander Club and was a member of the Leander eight, which won the gold medal for Great Britain rowing at the 1912 Summer Olympics. At the age of 20, he was the crew's youngest member.

Horsfall stroked Oxford in the Boat Race in 1913 and became the first stroke to win the Boat Race after being behind at Barnes Railway Bridge. However, Oxford lost in 1914 when Horsfall rowed at number four. He won the Grand Challenge Cup at Henley Royal Regatta four times – three times as a stroke – and he twice stroked the winning crew in the Stewards' Challenge Cup at Henley on the two occasions when he competed.

After the war, he returned to Oxford to help re-establish rowing at the university. He was the strokeman of the Leander eight, which won the silver medal for Great Britain rowing at the 1920 Summer Olympics, coming within half a length of winning. In 1947, Horsfall was elected a Steward of Henley Royal Regatta, and the following year, he was manager of the British Olympic Rowing team.

== Military career ==
At the outbreak of the First World War, Horsfall joined the Rifle Brigade but later transferred to the Royal Flying Corps; He qualified as a pilot on 31 December 1914, and reached the rank of squadron leader. He was in command of 58 Squadron later in the war and briefly in 3 Squadron in late 1917. He was Mentioned in Dispatches and awarded the Military Cross and Chevalier in the Légion d'honneur in 1916 when he was a temporary second lieutenant and temporary captain. He reached the rank of Major later in 1916 but became unfit for active service at times in 1917 and 1918. He was promoted to Lieutenant-Colonel in 1918.

== See also ==
- List of Oxford University Boat Race crews
