= Church of St Margaret of Antioch, Liverpool =

Coordinates: 53.3954°N 2.9657°W

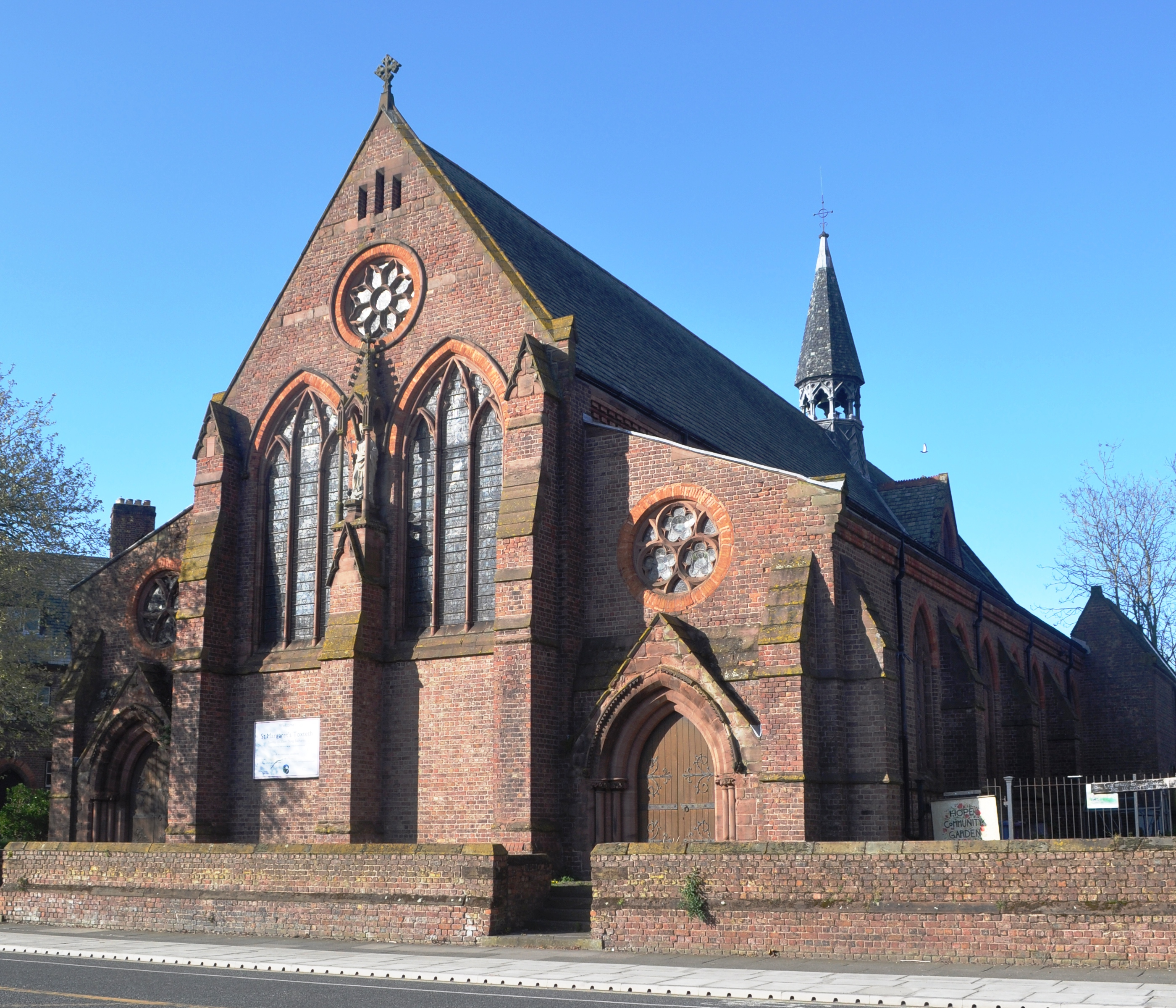
- The church in 2024

- Location in Liverpool
- OS grid reference: SJ 359,892
- Location: Prince's Road, Toxteth, Liverpool
- Country: England
- Denomination: Anglican
- Churchmanship: Liberal Anglo-Catholic
- Website: St Margaret, Liverpool

History
- Status: Parish church
- Founder: Robert Horsfall
- Dedication: St Margaret of Antioch

Architecture
- Functional status: Active
- Heritage designation: Grade II*
- Designated: 12 July 1966
- Architect: G. E. Street
- Architectural type: Church
- Style: Gothic Revival (Decorated)
- Groundbreaking: 1868

Specifications
- Materials: Brick, stone dressings, slate roof

Administration
- Province: York
- Diocese: Liverpool
- Archdeaconry: Liverpool
- Deanery: Toxteth and Wavertree
- Parish: St Margaret, Toxteth

Clergy
- Priest: The Revd Canon Bob Lewis

The Church of St Margaret of Antioch is in Prince's Road, Toxteth, Liverpool, England. It is an active Anglican parish church in the diocese of Liverpool, the archdeaconry of Liverpool, and the deanery of Toxteth and Wavertree. The church is recorded in the National Heritage List for England as a designated Grade II* listed building.

== History ==
The church was built in 1868–69 and designed by G. E. Street. The architectural style of the church is Decorated. It was paid for by Robert Horsfall, a local stockbroker and Anglo-Catholic. In 1924–26 the Jesus Chapel, designed by Hubert B. Adderley, was added to the north of the church. The architectural style of the church is Decorated.

The church became "the centre of Anglo-Catholicism in 19th-century Liverpool". In 1887, the vicar, James Bell Cox, was imprisoned under the Public Worship Regulation Act 1874.

== Architecture ==
=== Exterior ===
St Margaret's is constructed in common brick, with dressings in red brick and stone, and has a slate roof. Its plan consists of a nave and chancel forming a single vessel, the nave being flanked by aisles. There is no clerestory. On the roof, at the division of the nave and chancel, is a timber bellcote. In the central part of the west end of the church are two three-light windows, with a buttress between them and on each side. Above the central buttress is a canopied niche containing a statue of St Margaret of Antioch. Over this is a rose window. To the sides of the central part are the aisles under lean-to roofs; each has a doorway with a rose window above. A passage leads from the north side of the church to the vicarage.

=== Interior ===
Inside the church are six-bay arcades carried on marble piers with bands of alternating colours. The chancel is at a higher level, and is separated from the nave by a low marble wall with central iron gates. In the chancel are a piscina and a sedilia. On the north side of the chancel is a two-bay arcade leading to the Jesus Chapel. The font is circular, carried on six columns, and stands on a hexagonal base. The pulpit is in gilded wood, and is decorated with busts of saints. In the chancel floor is a brass to Robert Horsfall. There is much painted decoration on the walls, most of it by Maddox and Pearce. Much of the stained glass is by Clayton and Bell. The glass in the west window of the south aisle is by Percy Bacon Brothers. At the east end of the church are two windows, replaced after the Second World War, which were designed by Gerald E. R. Smith and H. L. Pawle, and made in the A. K. Nicholson Studio. In the Jesus chapel is an ornate polychrome reredos. The two-manual pipe organ was made in 1869 by Henry Willis.

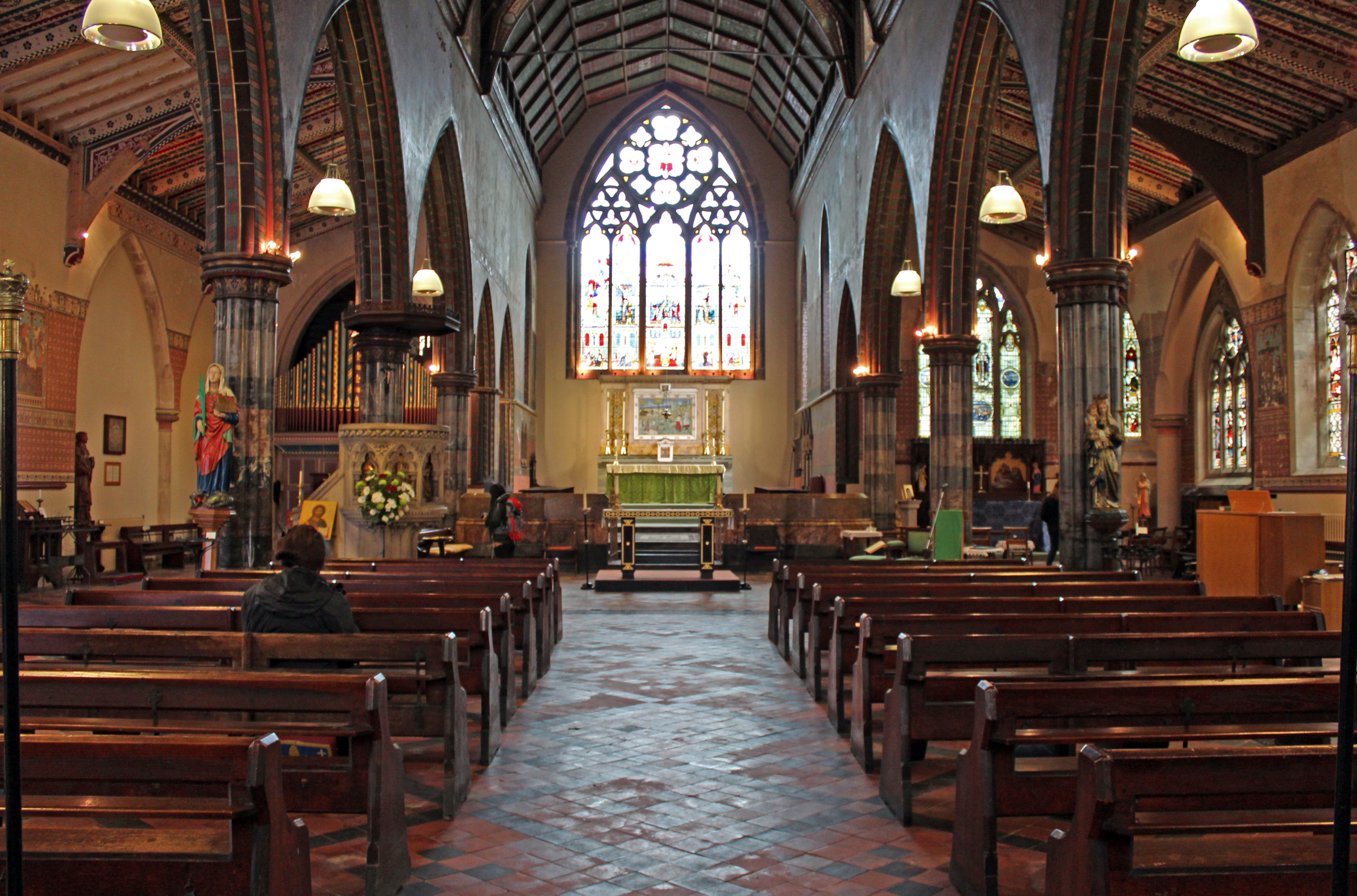
Nave looking east

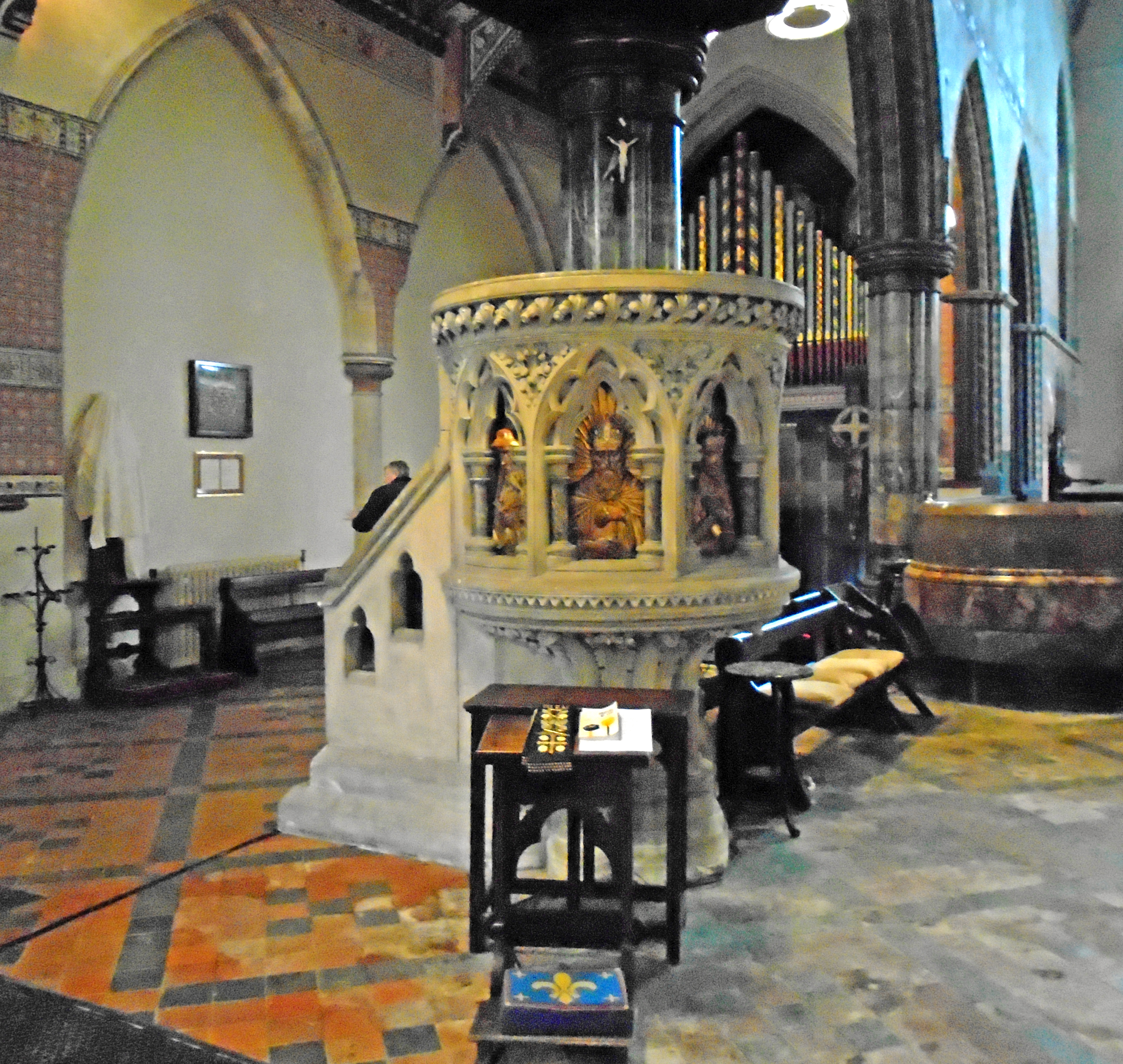
Pulpit

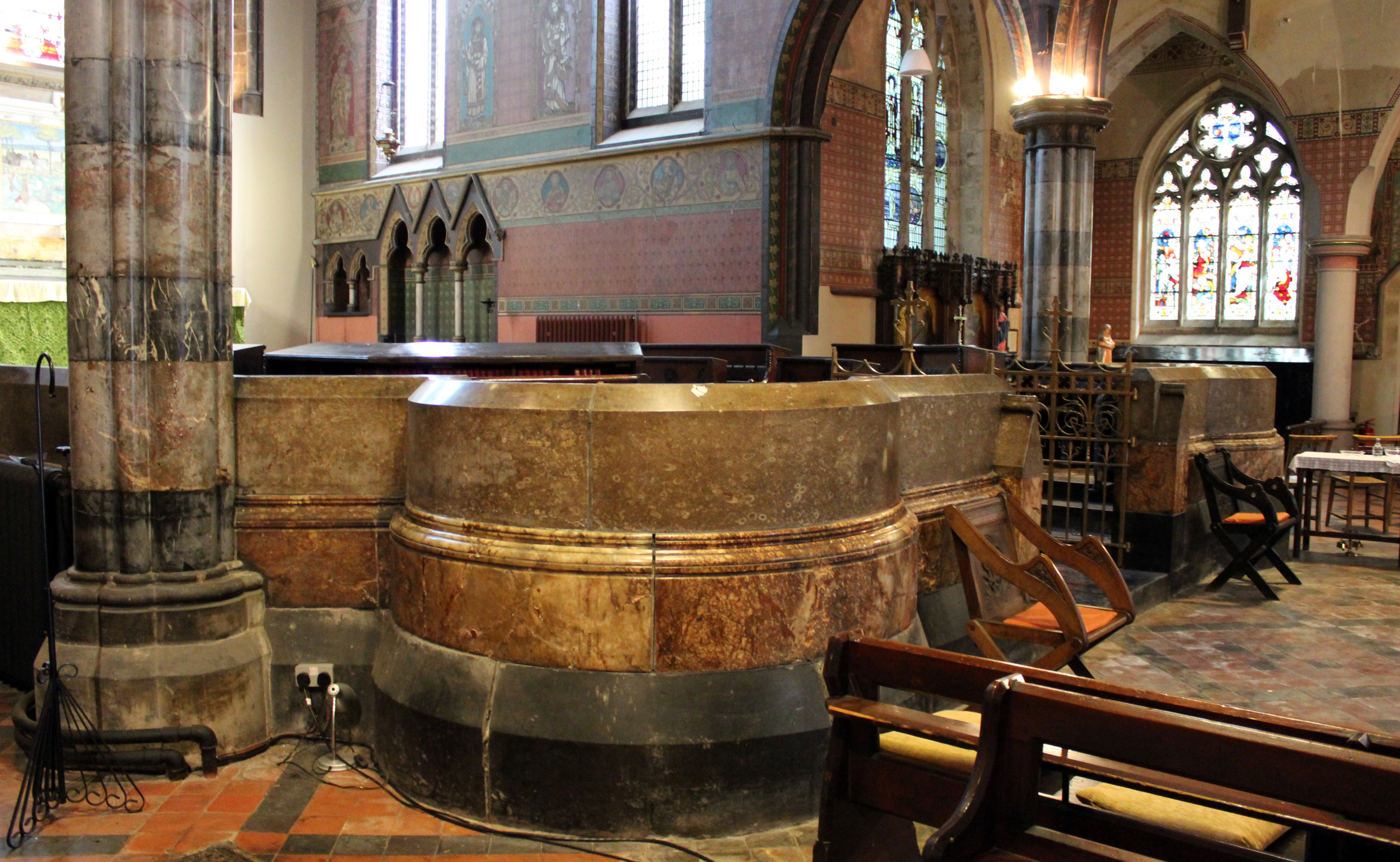
Chancel railings

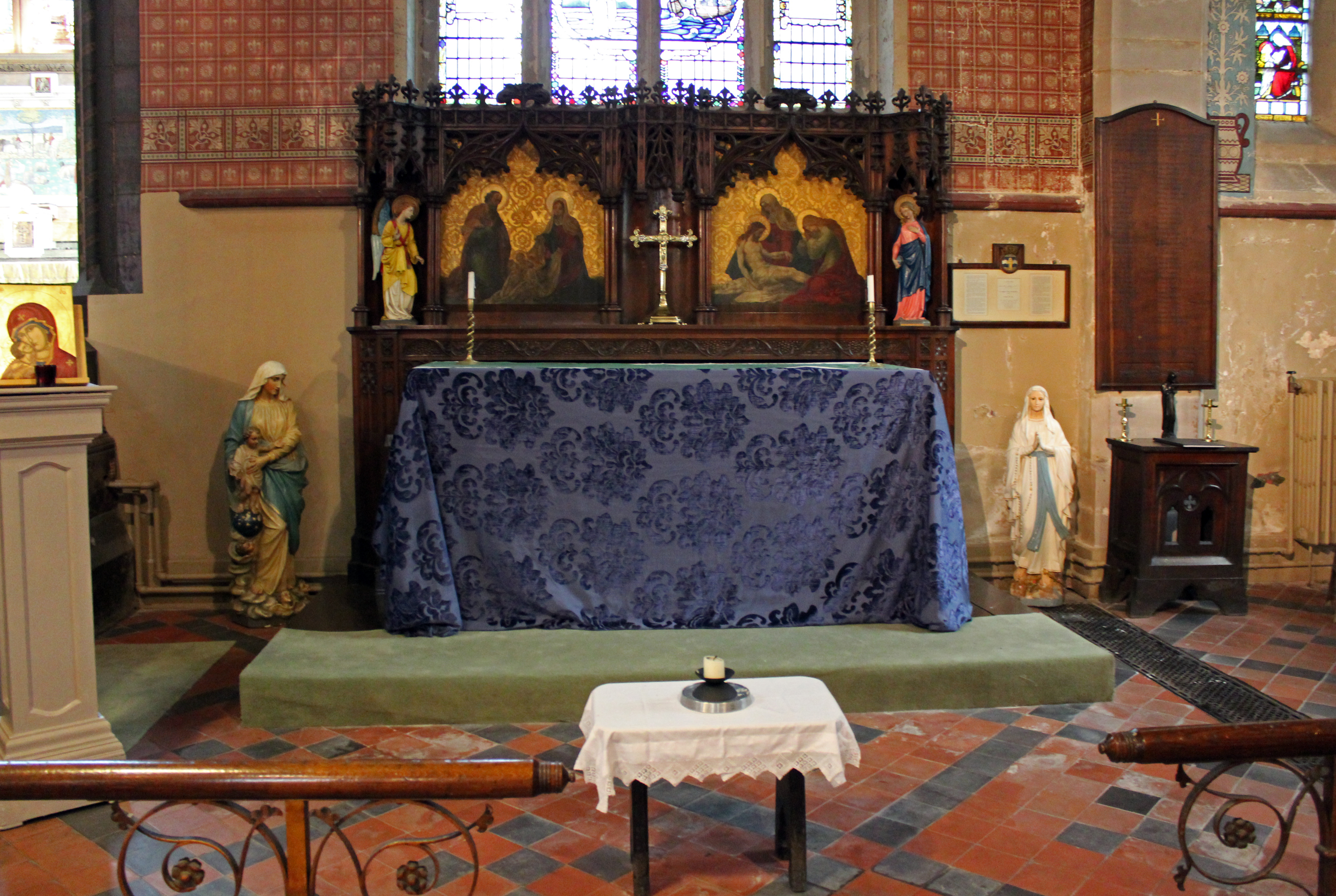
Altar, Lady Chapel

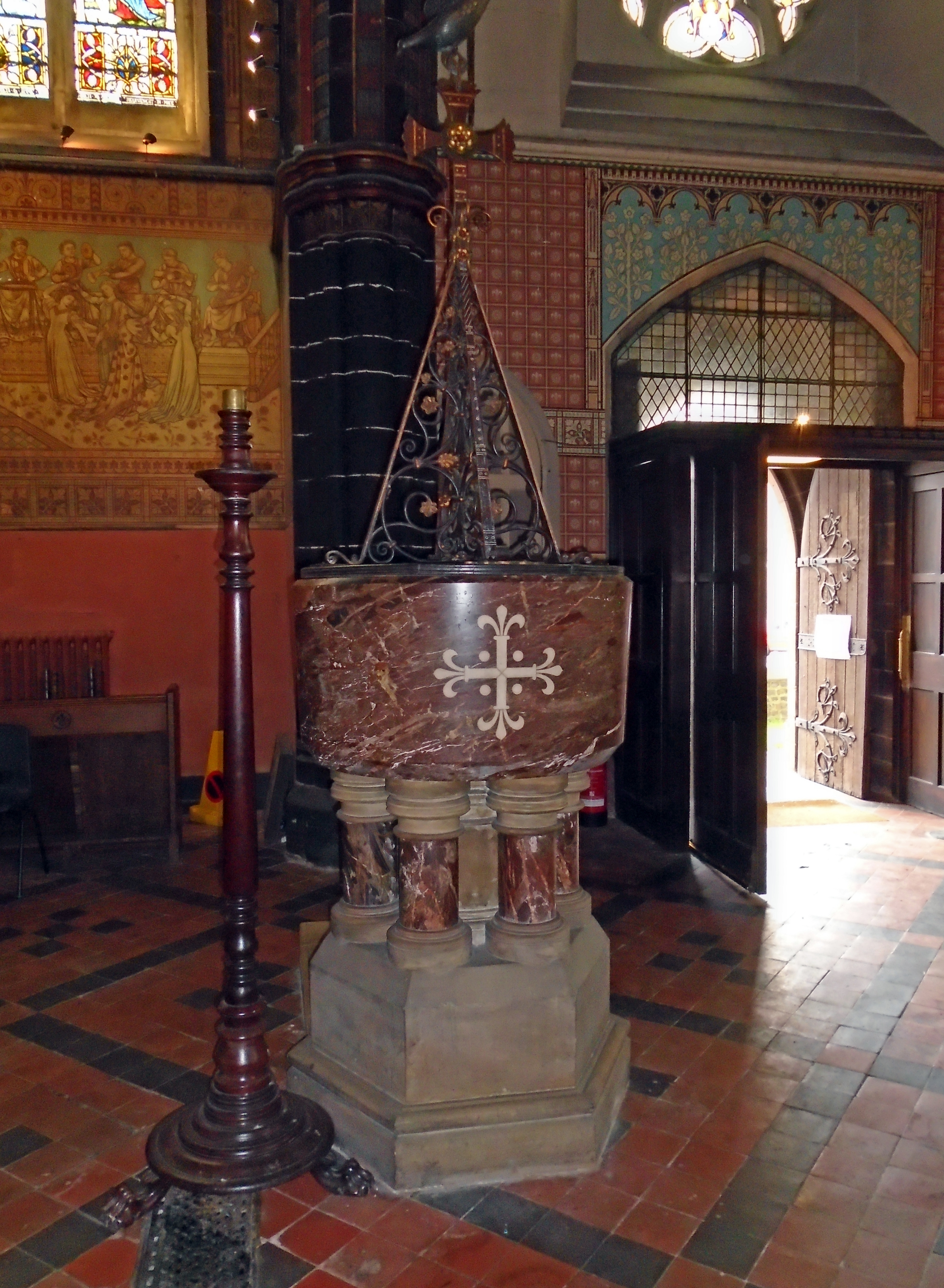
Font

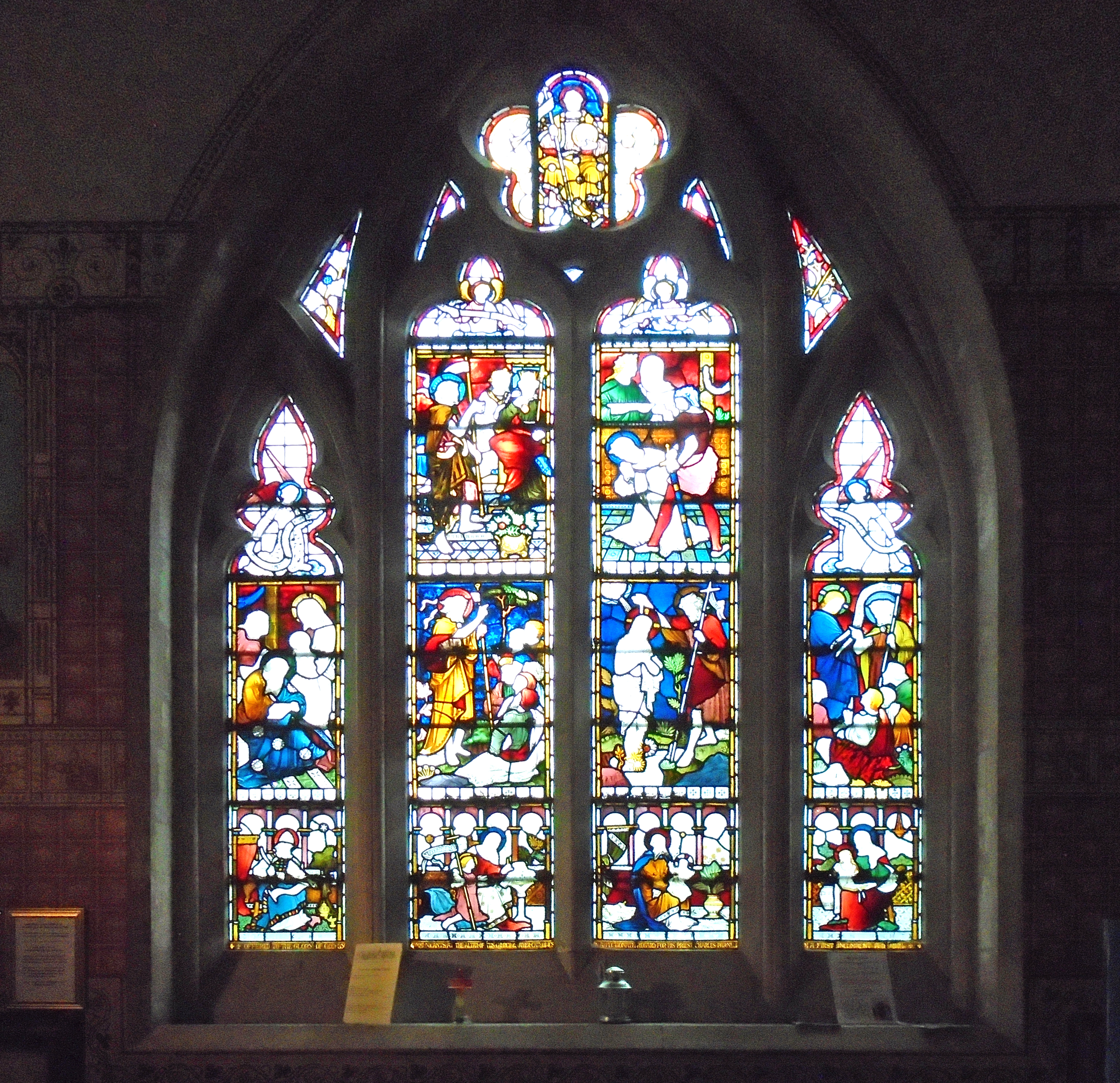
Stained-glass window

== See also ==
- Grade II* listed buildings in Merseyside

== Sources ==
- Simpson, W. J. Sparrow (1933). "The revival from 1845 to 1933". In Williams, Norman Powell; Harris, Charles (eds.). Northern Catholicism: centenary studies in the Oxford and parallel movements. SPCK.
