= Simon Horsfall =

English cricketer

Personal information
- Full name: Simon Daniel Horsfall
- Born: 4 March 1976 (age 50); Leeds, Yorkshire, England
- Batting: Left-handed
- Bowling: Right-arm leg break

Domestic team information
- Years: Team
- 1997–1998: Staffordshire

Career statistics
Competition	List A
Matches	2
Runs scored	2
Batting average	1.00
100s/50s	0/0
Top score	2
Balls bowled	72
Wickets	1
Bowling average	43.00
5 wickets in innings	0
10 wickets in match	0
Best bowling	1/28
Catches/stumpings	2/–
- Source: Cricinfo, 14 June 2011

Simon Daniel Horsfall (born 4 March 1976) is a former English cricketer. Horsfall was a left-handed batsman who bowled leg break. He was born in Leeds, Yorkshire.

Horsfall made his debut for Staffordshire in the 1997 Minor Counties Championship against Buckinghamshire. Horsfall played Minor counties cricket for Staffordshire from 1997 to 1998, which included 14 Minor Counties Championship matches and 4 MCCA Knockout Trophy matches. In 1997, he made his List A debut against Nottinghamshire in the NatWest Trophy. He played a further List A match against Leicestershire in the 1998 NatWest Trophy. In his 2 List A matches, he scored 2 runs and took a single wicket at a cost of 43.00, with best figures of 1/28.
