= St Mary and St Cyril's Coptic Orthodox Church =

Coordinates: 53.4190°N 2.9151°W

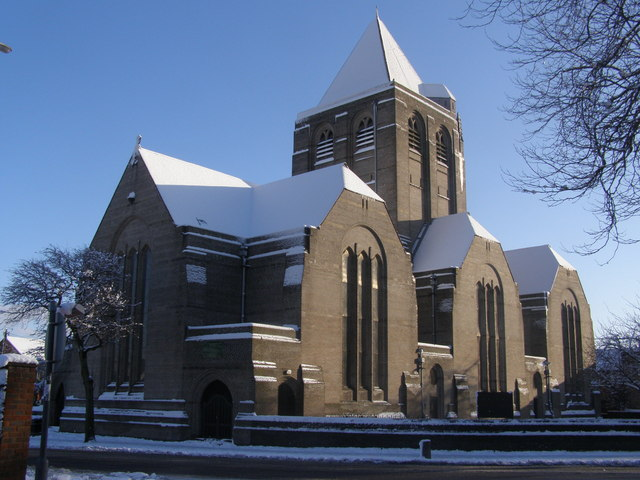
- Southwest photograph from when it was still known as the Church of St Paul, Liverpool

- Location in Merseyside
- OS grid reference: SJ 393 917
- Location: Derby Lane, Stoneycroft, Liverpool
- Country: England
- Denomination: Coptic Orthodox Church, previously Anglican
- Website: currently previously St Paul, Liverpool (available on web archive)

History
- Former name(s): The Church of St Paul, Derby Lane, Liverpool.
- Status: Parish church
- Founder: H. Douglas Horsfall

Architecture
- Functional status: Active
- Heritage designation: Grade II*
- Designated: 12 July 1966
- Architect: Giles Gilbert Scott
- Architectural type: Church
- Style: Gothic Revival
- Groundbreaking: 1913
- Completed: 1916

Specifications
- Length: 142 feet 3 inches (43 m)
- Width: 57 feet 3 inches (17 m)
- Materials: Brick, tile roofs

Administration
- Diocese: Diocese of the Midlands, United Kingdom

Clergy
- Priest: Fr. Peter Farrington

St Mary and St Cyril's Coptic Orthodox Church, previously known as the Church of St Paul, is a Coptic church in Stoneycroft, Liverpool, England. It is recorded in the National Heritage List for England as a designated Grade II* listed building. It was designed by Giles Gilbert Scott, who also designed the Anglican Liverpool Cathedral.

In 2016 the building was closed with a view to selling it to the Coptic Orthodox Church. Its Anglican benefice was united with that of St Anne, Stanley. The Coptic Orthodox Youth Society of the Liverpool Guild of Students is highly involved with the church and frequently takes part in Tasbeha and youth meetings.

== History ==
=== Church of England ===
The church was built between 1913 and 1916, and was paid for by H. Douglas Horsfall. The church has been restored three times; in 1955, in 1972 and in 1998–2013.

=== Coptic Orthodox Church ===
In 2016 the building was sold to the Coptic Orthodox Diocese of the Midlands and is now St Mary & St Cyril's Coptic Orthodox Church.

Fr. Bishoy was priest, before Fr. Peter Farrington was made the new priest in 2023.

== Architecture ==
=== Exterior ===
The church is constructed with a concrete core, lined internally and externally with brick. It has stone bands and dressings, and a tiled roof. It consists of a nave and chancel without division, north and south narrow (passage) aisles, three north and south transepts, and a large central tower. (Note: The church is orientated north-south, making the ritual west the actual north. The directions given in the article are the ritual directions.) The tower has a round-arched recess on each side containing round-headed two-light bell openings, which have louvres and Y-tracery. On top of the tower is a pyramidal roof. The southeast corner of the tower is chamfered and contains a canted stair turret surmounted by a pinnacle. At the west end are three lancet windows in an arched recess; it is flanked on each side by a porch. Each transept has a half-hipped gable, and contains windows similar to those at the west end. The east wall is blank, and there are four-light windows in the north and south walls of the chancel. The aisles have rose windows.

=== Interior ===
The interior of the church is plain, being entirely rendered other than for areas of exposed brick acting as dressings. It is effectively in three bays, each with a square groin vault, which are joined to each other by pointed tunnel vaults. Steps lead up to the chancel, whose south transept contains a chapel, and the north transept an organ loft and vestry. The low chancel wall has a canted pulpit at each end. The three-manual pipe organ was built in 1916 by Rushworth and Dreaper at a cost of about £1,000 (equivalent to £80,000 in 2025). The organ case dates from the 18th century and was originally in the former St Paul's Church, which has been demolished. (Note: The old St Paul's was located in St Paul's Square. It closed in 1901 and was demolished in 1931.) It is decorated with carving by Grinling Gibbons. (Note: This was the first organ to be played by Ian Tracey when he was aged six; he is now the Organist Titulaire of Liverpool Cathedral.) In the tower are two bells, which were also moved from the old St Paul's. The older bell dates from 1775, and the newer, larger bell was cast in 1861 in Murphy's Bell Foundry, Dublin. The bells were restored in 1975 at the Whitechapel Bell Foundry.

== See also ==
- Grade II* listed buildings in Merseyside
