= Dwight Isely =

American entomologist

Dwight Isely (15 August 1887 – 26 December 1974) was an American entomologist who worked on pest management, especially in cotton, and served as a professor of entomology at the University of Arkansas. He is considered a pioneer of what was later termed as Integrated Pest Management.

Isely was born to Christian and Elise Dubach Isely at Fairview, Kansas. He studied at Fairmount College (AB, 1910) and the University of Kansas (MA, 1913). He then worked at the Bureau of Entomology at the US Department of Agriculture in Washington DC. He joined the University of Arkansas in 1921 and worked there as a teacher, and researcher. He began a practice of routine collection of data on cotton pests through the use of students termed as "cotton scouts" (one of them was James G. Horsfall) to identify the best timing of insecticidal sprays or other interventions. Isely and R.W. Harned pioneered approaches to the management of Anthonomus grandis (boll weevil) using direct and indirect control measures based on strategies and tactics that were developed well before the phrase "Integrated Pest Management" was coined.

He married Blessie Elise Dort in 1916 and they had two sons, one of whom was the botanist Duane Isely. He is buried at Fairview Memorial Gardens, Fayetteville.
