= Plant pathology =

Scientific study of plant diseases

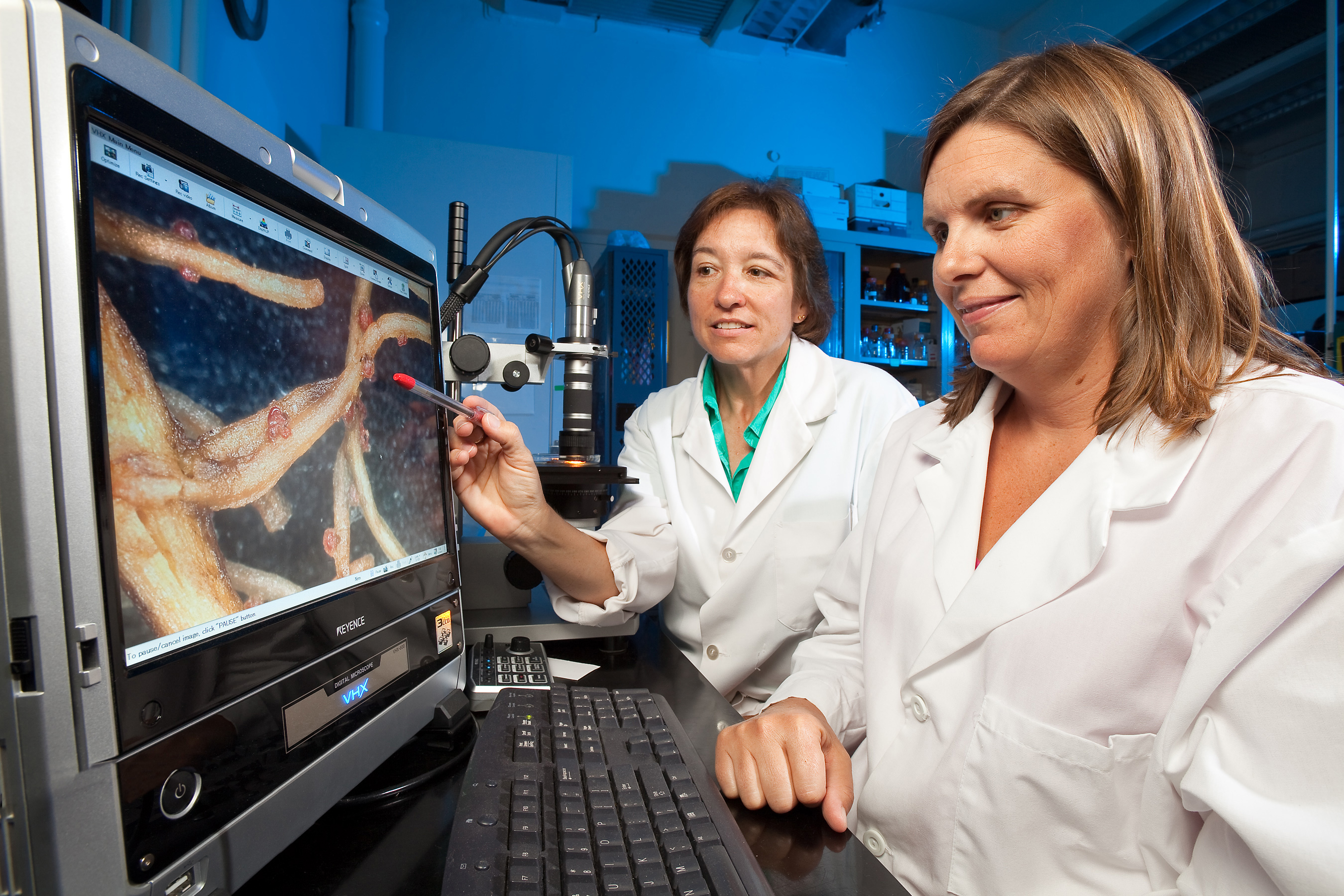
Agricultural Research Service plant pathologists examine cotton roots with a microscope to determine the level of infection by reniform nematode.

Plant pathology or phytopathology is the scientific study of plant diseases caused by pathogens (infectious organisms) and environmental conditions (physiological factors). Plant pathology involves the study of pathogen identification, disease etiology, disease cycles, economic impact, plant disease epidemiology, plant disease resistance, how plant diseases affect humans and animals, pathosystem genetics, and management of plant diseases.

== Plant pathogenicity ==
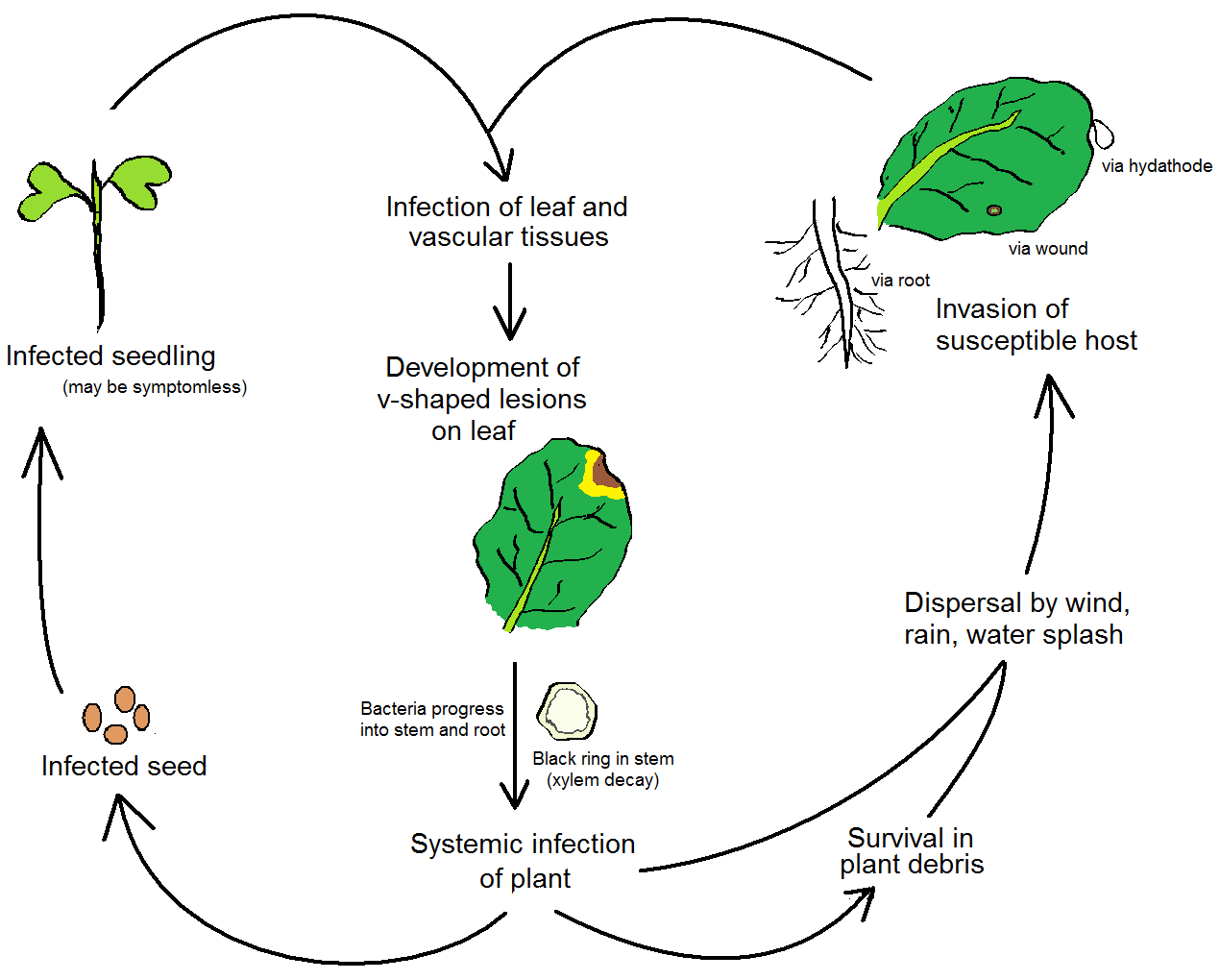
Life cycle of the black rot pathogen, the gram negative bacterium Xanthomonas campestris pathovar campestris

Plant pathogens, organisms that cause infectious plant diseases, include fungi, oomycetes, bacteria, viruses, viroids, virus-like organisms, phytoplasmas, protozoa, nematodes and parasitic plants. In most plant pathosystems, virulence depends on hydrolases and enzymes that degrade the cell wall. The vast majority of these act on pectins (for example, pectinesterase, pectate lyase, and pectinases). For microbes, the cell wall polysaccharides are both a food source and a barrier to be overcome. Many pathogens grow opportunistically when the host breaks down its own cell walls, most often during fruit ripening. Unlike human and animal pathology, plant pathology usually focuses on a single causal organism; however, some plant diseases have been shown to be interactions between multiple pathogens.

To colonize a plant, pathogens have specific pathogenicity factors, of five main types: uses of cell wall–degrading enzymes, toxins, effector proteins, phytohormones, and exopolysaccharides.

- Cell wall-degrading enzymes: These are used to break down the plant cell wall in order to release the nutrients inside and include esterases, glycosyl hydrolases, lyases and oxidoreductases.
- Toxins: These can be non-host-specific, which damage all plants, or host-specific, which cause damage only on a host plant.
- Effector proteins: These can be secreted by pathogens such as bacteria, fungi, and oomycetes into the extracellular environment or directly into the host cell, often via the Type three secretion system. Some effectors are known to suppress host immune processes. This can include reducing or inhibiting the plant's internal signaling mechanisms or reduction of phytochemicals production.
- Phytohormones are chemicals used by plants for signaling; pathogens can produce these to modify plant growth to their own advantage.
- Exopolysaccharides are mostly small chains of sugars that help pathogens to adhere to a plant's surface, enabling them to begin the process of infection.

== Physiological plant disorders ==
Some abiotic disorders can be confused with pathogen-induced disorders. Abiotic causes include natural processes such as drought, frost, snow and hail; flooding and poor drainage; nutrient deficiency; deposition of mineral salts such as sodium chloride and gypsum; windburn and breakage by storms; and wildfires.

== Epidemiology ==
Plant disease triangle

Epidemiology is the study of factors affecting the outbreak and spread of infectious diseases.

A disease triangle describes the basic factors required for plant diseases. These are the host plant, the pathogen, and the environment. Any one of these can be modified to control a disease.

== Disease resistance ==
Plant disease resistance is the ability of a plant to prevent and terminate infections from plant pathogens. Structures that help plants prevent pathogens from entering are the cuticular layer, cell walls, and stomata guard cells. Once pathogens have overcome these barriers, plant receptors initiate signaling pathways to create molecules to compete against the foreign molecules. These pathways are influenced and triggered by genes within the host plant and can be manipulated by genetic breeding to create resistant varieties.

== Management ==
=== Detection ===
Ancient methods of leaf examination and breaking open plant material by hand are now augmented by newer technologies. These include molecular pathology assays such as polymerase chain reaction (PCR), RT-PCR and loop-mediated isothermal amplification (LAMP). Although PCR can detect multiple molecular targets in a single solution there are limits. Bertolini et al. 2001, Ito et al. 2002, and Ragozzino et al. 2004 developed PCR methods for multiplexing six or seven plant pathogen molecular products and Persson et al. 2005 for multiplexing four with RT-PCR. More extensive molecular diagnosis requires PCR arrays. The primary detection method used worldwide is enzyme linked immunosorbent assay.

=== Biological ===
Crop rotation is a traditional and sometimes effective means of preventing a parasitic population from becoming well-established. For example, protection against infection by Agrobacterium tumefaciens, which causes gall diseases in many plants, by dipping cuttings in suspensions of Agrobacterium radiobacter before inserting them in the ground to take root.

== History ==
Plant pathology has developed from antiquity, starting with Theophrastus in the ancient era, but scientific study began in the Early Modern period with the invention of the microscope, and developed in the 19th century.

== Notable people in plant pathology ==
- George Washington Carver
- Anton de Bary
- Erwin Frink Smith
- Agnes Robertson Arber
- Harold Henry Flor

== See also ==
- American Phytopathological Society
- Australasian Plant Pathology Society
- British Society for Plant Pathology
- Forest pathology
- Gene-for-gene relationship
- Global Plant Clinic
- Glossary of phytopathology
- Horsfall-Barratt scale
- List of phytopathology journals
- Microbial inoculant
- Phytopharmacology
- Plant disease forecasting
- Stunting
