= Edward Horsfall (rugby union) =

England international rugby union player

- Full name: Edward Luke Horsfall
- Born: 11 August 1917 Huddersfield, Yorkshire, England
- Died: June 1981 (aged 63) Bracknell, Berkshire, England

Rugby union career
- Position: Flanker
International career
Years	Team	Apps	(Points)
1949	England	1	(0)

Edward Luke Horsfall (11 August 1917 - June 1981) was an English rugby union international.

Born in Huddersfield, Horsfall joined the Royal Air Force (RAF) after leaving Giggleswick School in 1935. He was a rear gunner during World War II and had a total of 35 years of RAF service, attaining the rank of Wing Commander.

Horsfall, a flanker, was capped by England against Wales at Cardiff Arms Park in the 1949 Five Nations. England's captain for the match, Nim Hall, hailed from Golcar, the same village outside Huddersfield that Horsfall was raised. His club rugby was played for Huddersfield, Headingley and Harlequins. He made six county appearances for Yorkshire.

A history teacher at Lambrook, Horsfall died of a heart attack on school grounds in 1981, at the age of 63.

== See also ==
- List of England national rugby union players
