= John Horsfall (bishop) =

Irish Anglican bishop

John Horsfall, a Yorkshireman, was Bishop of Ossory from 1586 until his death in 1609.

== Notes ==
Church of Ireland titles
Preceded by Nicholas Walsh	Bishop of Ossory; 1586–1609	Succeeded by Richard Deane
