= Horsfall baronets =

Set index for Horsfall baronets

There have been two baronetcies created for persons with the surname Horsfall, one in the Baronetage of Ireland and one in the Baronetage of the United Kingdom.

- Horsfall baronets of Kilkenny (1642), possibly created in that year for Sir Ciprian Horsfall (died 1693, when the title would be extinct), son of John Horsfall. He was High Sheriff of County Kilkenny in 1641. Cokayne regarded the title as only tentatively supported.
- Horsfall baronets of Hayfield (1909)
