= Duane Isely =

- Born: October 24, 1918; Bentonville, Arkansas
- Died: December 7, 2000 (aged 82); Des Moines, Iowa
- Scientific career
- Fields: Botany
- Author abbrev. (botany): Isely

Duane Isely (1918–2000) was an American professor of botany and an expert on seed technology and weeds.

== Biography ==
Isely was born to Dwight Isely, a professor of entomology, and Blessie Elise, both of whom studied and worked at the University of Arkansas. He too graduated from the University of Arkansas with a bachelor's degree in 1938 and a master's degree in 1939. In 1942 he received his PhD from Cornell University with thesis supervisor Walter Conrad Muenscher (1891–1963). From 1942 to 1944 Isely conducted studies on the herbaceous plants of the reservoirs being constructed for the Tennessee Valley Authority. In 1944 he was appointed an extension associate at Iowa State University, where he was put in charge of the seed laboratory. At Iowa State University he was an assistant professor from 1947 to 1948, an associate professor from 1949 to 1955, and a full professor from 1956 to 1981. He was appointed Distinguished Professor in 1981 and retired in 1989 as professor emeritus.

As a specialist in seed technology, Isely published a textbook and more than 50 articles on the subject. In addition, he was an active weed scientist, publishing about 20 books and laboratory manuals on native weeds and naturalized legumes (Fabaceae) from the United States (excluding Alaska and Hawaii). He collected legumes in most of the states of the US and his total of collected specimens exceeded 11,000. In the 1980s he played an important role in having the Iowa State University Herbarium renamed in honor of Ada Hayden.

He was married three times. There were two children from his first marriage.

== Selected publications ==
=== Books ===
- One Hundred and One Botanists. Purdue University Press. 2002. p. 351. ISBN 9781557532831. (pbk reprint of 1994 original, Iowa State University Press)
- with Lloyd M. Wax and Richard S. Fawcett: Weeds of the North Central States. DIANE Publ. 1999. p. 303. ISBN 0788177605.
- Vascular Flora of the Southeastern United States: Leguminosae (Fabaceae). Vol. 3, Part 2. University of North Carolina Press. 1999. p. 277. ISBN 080781900X.
- Native and naturalized Leguminosae (Fabaceae) of the United States: (exclusive of Alaska and Hawaii). Monte L. Bean Life Science Museum, Brigham Young University. 1998. p. 1007. ISBN 0842523960.
- Leguminosae of the United States, III: subfamily Papilionoidae, tribes Sophoreae, Podalyrieae, Loteae. Memoirs Series. Vol. 25. New York Botanical Garden. 1981. p. 264. ISBN 0893272329.
- Leguminosae of the United States: I. subfamily mimosoideae. Memoirs Series. Vol. 25. New York Botanical Garden. 1973. p. 152.
- Weed identification and control in the North Central States. Iowa State College Press. 1958. p. 152.
- Fifty years of seed testing (1908-1958). Association of Official Seed Analysis of North America. 1958. p. 101.
