= William R. Horsfall =

American entomologist

William Robert Horsfall
- Born: 11 January 1907
- Died: 18 November 1998 (aged 91)
- Occupation: Professor of medical entomology

Academic background
- Education: Ph.D., Cornell University University of Arkansas Kansas State University

Academic work
- Institutions: University of Illinois at Urbana-Champaign

William Robert Horsfall (11 January 1907 - 18 November 1998) was an American entomologist who was a professor of medical entomology at the University of Illinois at Urbana-Champaign and a specialist on mosquitoes particularly in the genus Aedes.

Horsfall was born in Mountain Grove, Missouri to Frank and Margaret Uaulx. His father was president of a college that is now the University of Arkansas at Monticello while his mother served as dean of women there. His brother James G. Horsfall became a plant pathologist of repute. Horsfall graduated from the University of Arkansas in 1928 and then studied at Kansas State University, followed by a Ph.D. in Cornell under G.W. Herrick. During World War II he commanded the 17th Malaria Survey Unit in the South Pacific and was discharged with the rank of lieutenant colonel. He then worked from the University of Illinois from 1947 until his retirement in 1976. For his teaching he received an Ernest H. Wakefield Citation. He also worked as a consultant for the World Health Organization. He was elected in 1964 a fellow of the American Association for the Advancement of Science

Among his works was a comprehensive bibliography of medical entomology (which included Russian sources).
