= Charles Horsfall =

British merchant (1776–1846)

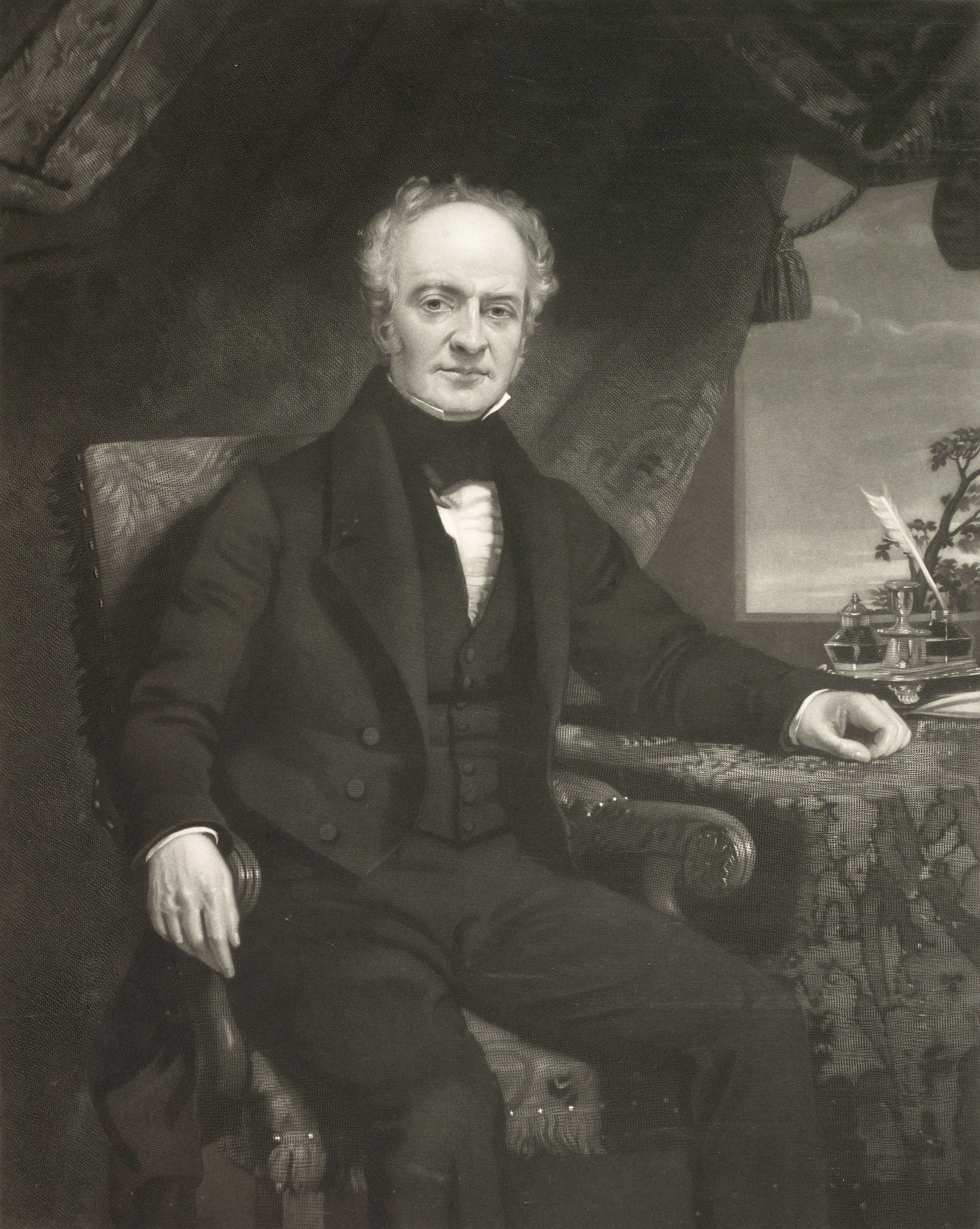
Portrait of Horsfall, by Edward Burton after John Graham-Gilbert

Charles Horsfall (21 June 1776 – 18 June 1846) was a merchant and slave-owner who served as Mayor of Liverpool 1832–1833.

== Life ==
=== Early life ===
Horsfall was born in Huddersfield, Yorkshire, the son of Joseph Horsfield and Anna Hodgson, and was baptised at St Peter's Church, Huddersfield on 17 July 1776.

=== Jamaica ===
On 20 November 1792, aged 16, he sailed to Jamaica, where he established himself as a commodities trader.

=== Liverpool ===
He returned to England around 1803, and on 9 June 1803, he married Dorothy Hall Berry (7 October 1784 – 18 March 1846) at Trinity Church, Liverpool. Dorothy was born in Kingston, Jamaica as daughter of Thomas Berry and Dorothy Hall.

They had seven sons and five daughters: Ann (1804-), Thomas Berry (1805-1878), Robert (1807-1881), Mary Sale (1808-), Charles Hodgson (1810-1847), Eliza Dorothy (1812-1876), Caroline (1814-), Ellen (1816-), Dorothy (1818-1899), Louisa (1818-), Sarah Sophia (1820-), William Joseph (1822-) and George Henry (1824-1900).

In 1811 he constructed a mansion for himself and his family on Netherfield Road North, Everton.

He was Bailiff of Liverpool in 1829 and then Mayor in 1832.

He was an avid botanist, and his wife was a noted horticultural artist who contributed many plates to books and magazines of the time. His botanical passions were fuelled by his business trade connections with West Africa, the West Indies and the Americas. He was in partnership with another notable merchant family, the Tobins and also his cousins the Hodgsons, Jamaican plantation owners. He was a leading member of the Liverpool West India Association.

== Slave ownership ==
An 1823 slave register indicates that, at the time, Horsfall owned 69 slaves.

After the abolition of slavery in the British Empire in 1833, he was awarded compensation of just over £11,700 (equivalent to £1,290,000 in 2025), for slaves on the New Hope Estate in British Guiana and the Knowsley estate in Jamaica in his own right, and three others as an executor.

== Death and legacy ==
He died on 18 June 1846 in Crosby, Sefton, of "senile decline after paralysis". He is buried in St George's Church, Everton. His estate was valued at £262,000 (equivalent to £26,410,000 in 2025).

In his honour his family, led by his son Robert, built Christ Church on Great Homer Street in Everton. It was consecrated on 30 October 1848 (Annals of Liverpool, page 1903) by the Bishop of Chester. According to the Liverpool Evening Express of 9 September 1948, the cost of building was borne by the Horsfall family of Liverpool. Its patronage was vested in Trustees. The church was destroyed by German bombing in the May blitz of 1941.

His descendants, the Horsfall family, became notable for their building of churches in the Liverpool area.
